= Seaweed farming =

Farming of aquatic seaweed

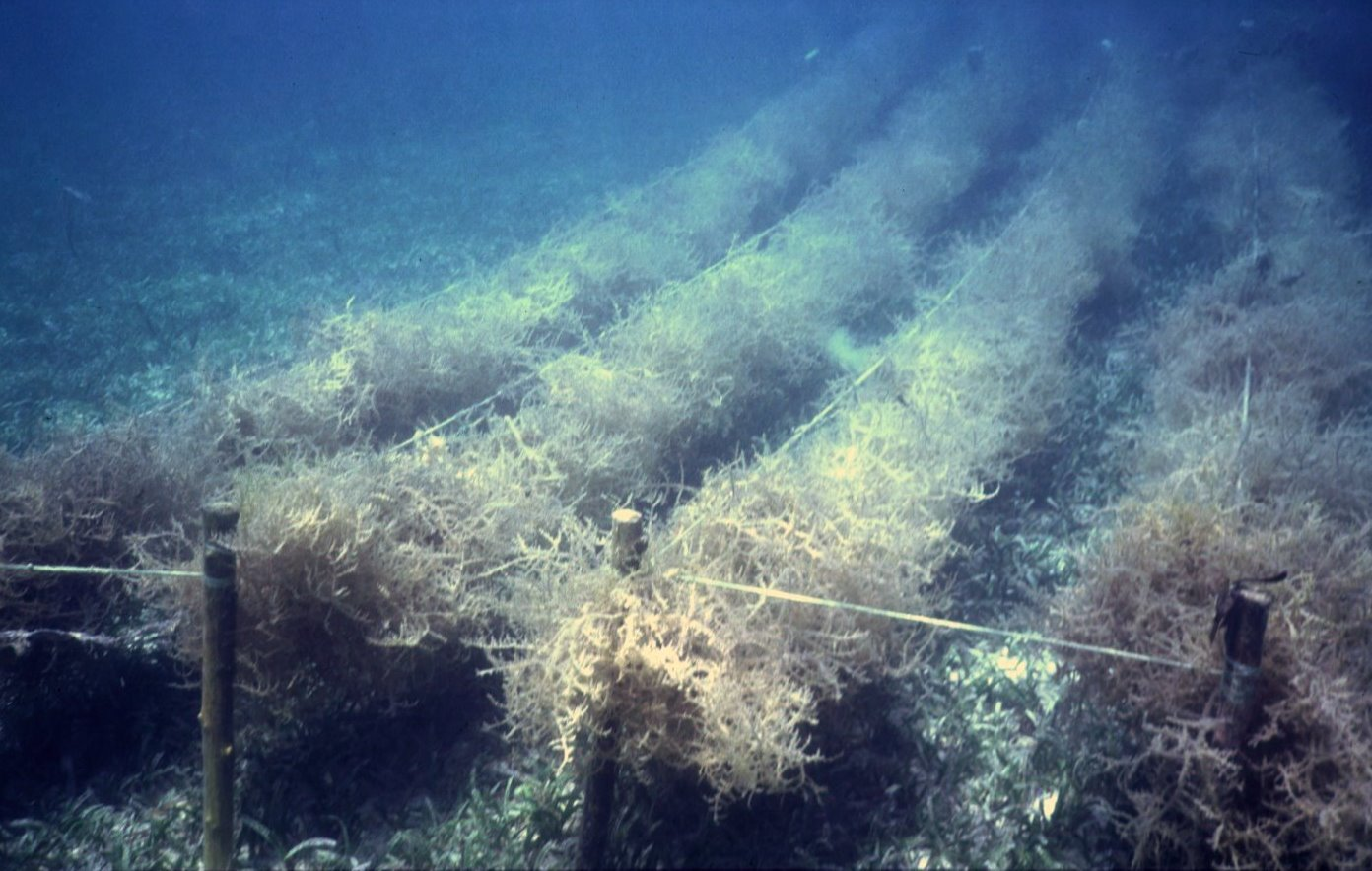
Underwater Eucheuma farming in the Philippines

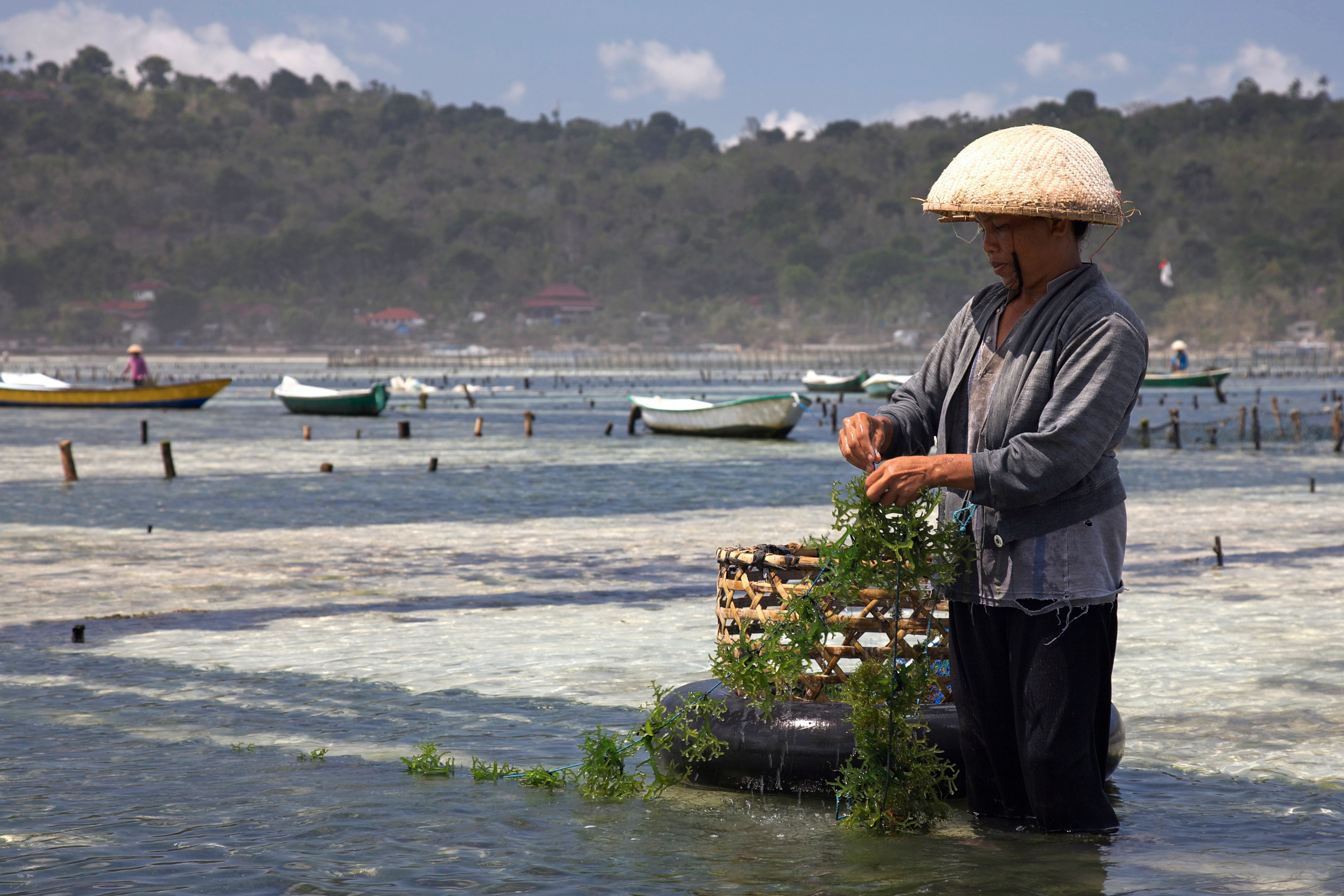
A seaweed farmer in Nusa Lembongan (Indonesia) gathers edible seaweed that has grown on a rope.

Seaweed farming or kelp farming is the practice of cultivating and harvesting seaweed. In its simplest form farmers gather from natural beds, while at the other extreme farmers fully control the crop's life cycle.

The seven most cultivated taxa are Eucheuma spp., Kappaphycus alvarezii, Gracilaria spp., Saccharina japonica, Undaria pinnatifida, Pyropia spp., and Sargassum fusiforme. Eucheuma and K. alvarezii are attractive for carrageenan (a gelling agent); Gracilaria is farmed for agar; the rest are eaten after limited processing. Seaweeds are different from mangroves and seagrasses, as they are photosynthetic algal organisms and are non-flowering.

The largest seaweed-producing countries as of 2022 are China (58.62%) and Indonesia (28.6%); followed by South Korea (5.09%) and the Philippines (4.19%). Other notable producers include North Korea (1.6%), Japan (1.15%), Malaysia (0.53%), Zanzibar (Tanzania, 0.5%), and Chile (0.3%). Seaweed farming has frequently been developed to improve economic conditions and to reduce fishing pressure.

The Food and Agriculture Organization (FAO) reported that world production in 2019 was over 35 million tonnes. North America produced some 23,000 tonnes of wet seaweed. Alaska, Maine, France, and Norway each more than doubled their seaweed production since 2018. As of 2019, seaweed represented 30% of marine aquaculture. In 2023, the global seaweed extract market was valued at $16.5 billion, with strong projected growth.

Seaweed farming is a carbon negative crop, with a high potential for climate change mitigation. The IPCC Special Report on the Ocean and Cryosphere in a Changing Climate recommends "further research attention" as a mitigation tactic. World Wildlife Fund, Oceans 2050, and The Nature Conservancy publicly support expanded seaweed cultivation.

== Methods ==
An American kelp farmer, Bren Smith of GreenWave explains his farming methods, including the symbiotic relationship kelp has with other seafood he grows.

The earliest seaweed farming guides in the Philippines recommended the cultivation of Laminaria seaweed and reef flats at approximately one meter's depth at low tide. They also recommended cutting off seagrasses and removing sea urchins before farm construction. Seedlings are tied to monofilament lines and strung between mangrove stakes in the substrate. This off-bottom method remains a primary method.

Long-line cultivation methods can be used in water approximately 7 meters (23 ft) in depth. Floating cultivation lines are anchored to the bottom and are widely used in North Sulawesi, Indonesia. Species cultured by long-line include those of the genera Saccharina, Undaria, Eucheuma, Kappaphycus, and Gracilaria.

Cultivation in Asia is relatively low-technology with a high labor requirement. Attempts to introduce technology to cultivate detached plant growth in tanks on land to reduce labor have yet to attain commercial viability.

== Diseases ==
A bacterial infection called ice-ice stunts seaweed crops. In the Philippines 15 percent reduction in one species appeared in 2011 to 2013, representing 268,000 tonnes of seaweed. The spread of ice-ice disease is strongly associated with increasing seawater temperatures.

== Ecological impacts ==
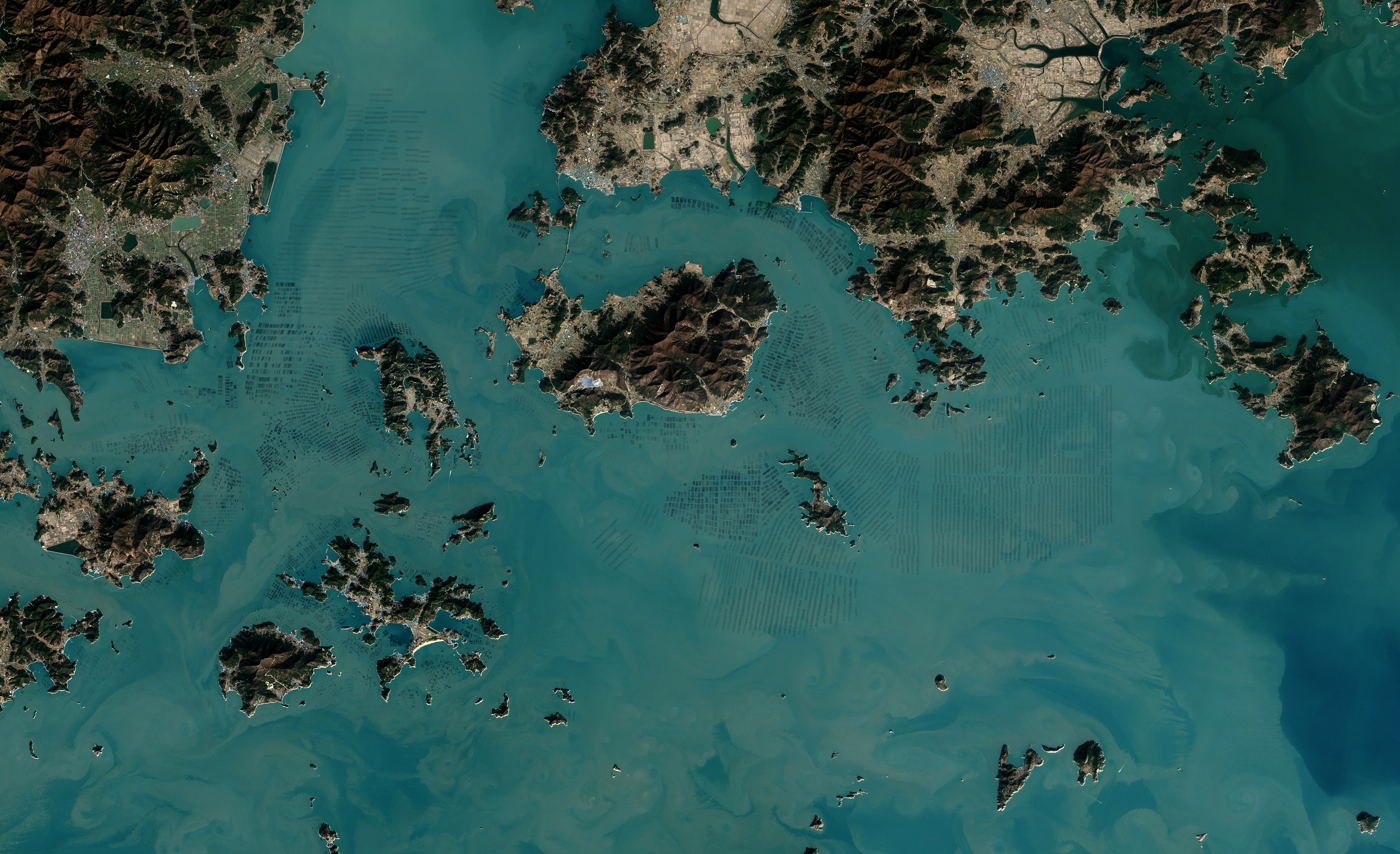
Aerial view of seaweed farms in South Korea

Seaweed is an extractive crop that has little need for fertilisers or water, meaning that seaweed farms typically have a smaller environmental footprint than other agriculture or fed aquaculture. Many of the impacts of seaweed farms, both positive and negative, remain understudied and uncertain.

Nonetheless, many environmental problems can result from seaweed farming. For instance, seaweed farmers sometimes cut down mangroves to use as stakes. Removing mangroves negatively affects farming by reducing water quality and mangrove biodiversity. Farmers may remove eelgrass from their farming areas, damaging water quality. Seaweed farms are routinely placed on top of seagrass meadows, particularly across Southeast Asia and the Western Indian Ocean, and numerous negative impacts occur.

Seaweed farming can pose a biosecurity risk, as farming activities have the potential to introduce or facilitate invasive species. For this reason, regions such as the UK, Maine and British Columbia only allow native varieties.

Farms may also have positive environmental effects. They may support welcome ecosystem services such as nutrient cycling, carbon uptake, and habitat provision.

Evidence suggests that seaweed farming can have positive impacts which include supplementing human diets, feeding livestock, creating biofuels, slowing climate change and providing crucial habitat for a marine life, but must scale sustainably in order to have these effects. One way for seaweed farming to scale at terrestrial farming levels is with the use of ROVs, which can install low-cost helical anchors that can extend seaweed farming into unprotected waters.

Seaweed can be used to capture, absorb, and incorporate excess nutrients into living tissue, aka nutrient bioextraction/bioharvesting, is the practice of farming and harvesting shellfish and seaweed to remove nitrogen and other nutrients from natural water bodies.

Similarly, seaweed farms may offer habitat that enhances biodiversity. Seaweed farms have been proposed to protect coral reefs by increasing diversity, providing habitat for local marine species. Farming may increase the production of herbivorous fish and shellfish. Pollinac reported an increase in Siginid population after the start of farming of Eucheuma seaweed in villages in North Sulawesi.

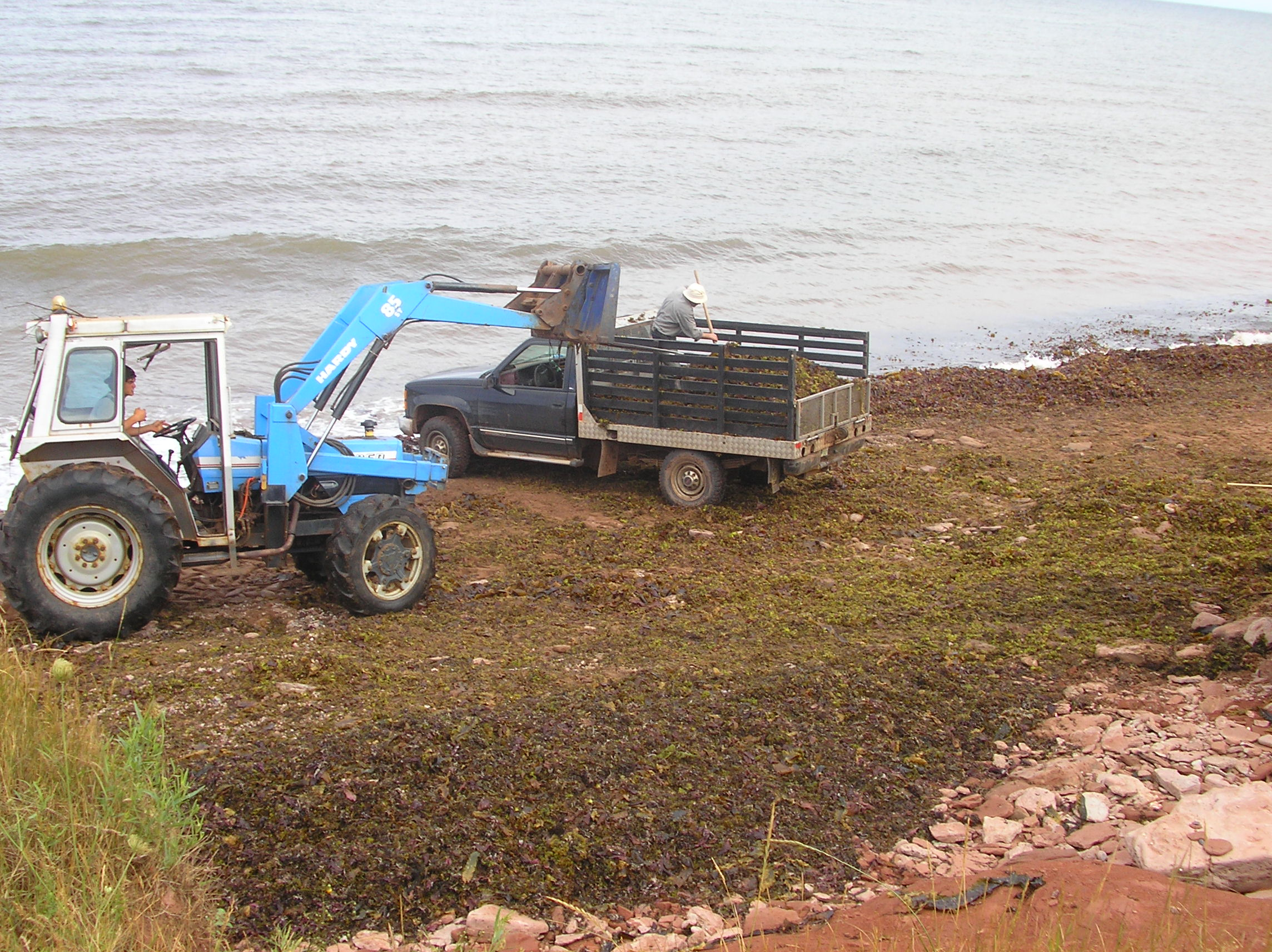
Harvesting seaweed in North Cape (Canada)

== Economic impacts ==
In Japan the annual production of nori amounts to US$2 billion. Such high production demands equivalent labour efforts, offering plentiful work opportunities.

A study conducted by the Philippines reported that plots of approximately one hectare could produce net income from Eucheuma farming that was 5 to 6 times the average wage of an agriculture worker. The study also reported an increase in seaweed exports from 675 metric tons (MT) in 1967 to 13,191 MT in 1980, and 28,000 MT by 1988.

About 0.7 million tonnes of carbon are removed from the sea each year by commercially harvested seaweeds. In Indonesia, seaweed farms account for 40 percent of the national fisheries output and employ about one million people.

The Safe Seaweed Coalition is a research and industry group that promotes seaweed cultivation.

=== Tanzania ===
Seaweed farming has had widespread socio-economic impacts in Tanzania, has become a very important source of resources for women, and is the third biggest contributor of foreign currency to the country. 90% of the farmers are women, and much of it is used by the skincare and cosmetics industry.

In 1982 Adelaida K. Semesi began a programme of research into seaweed cultivation in Zanzibar and its application resulted in greater investment in the industry.

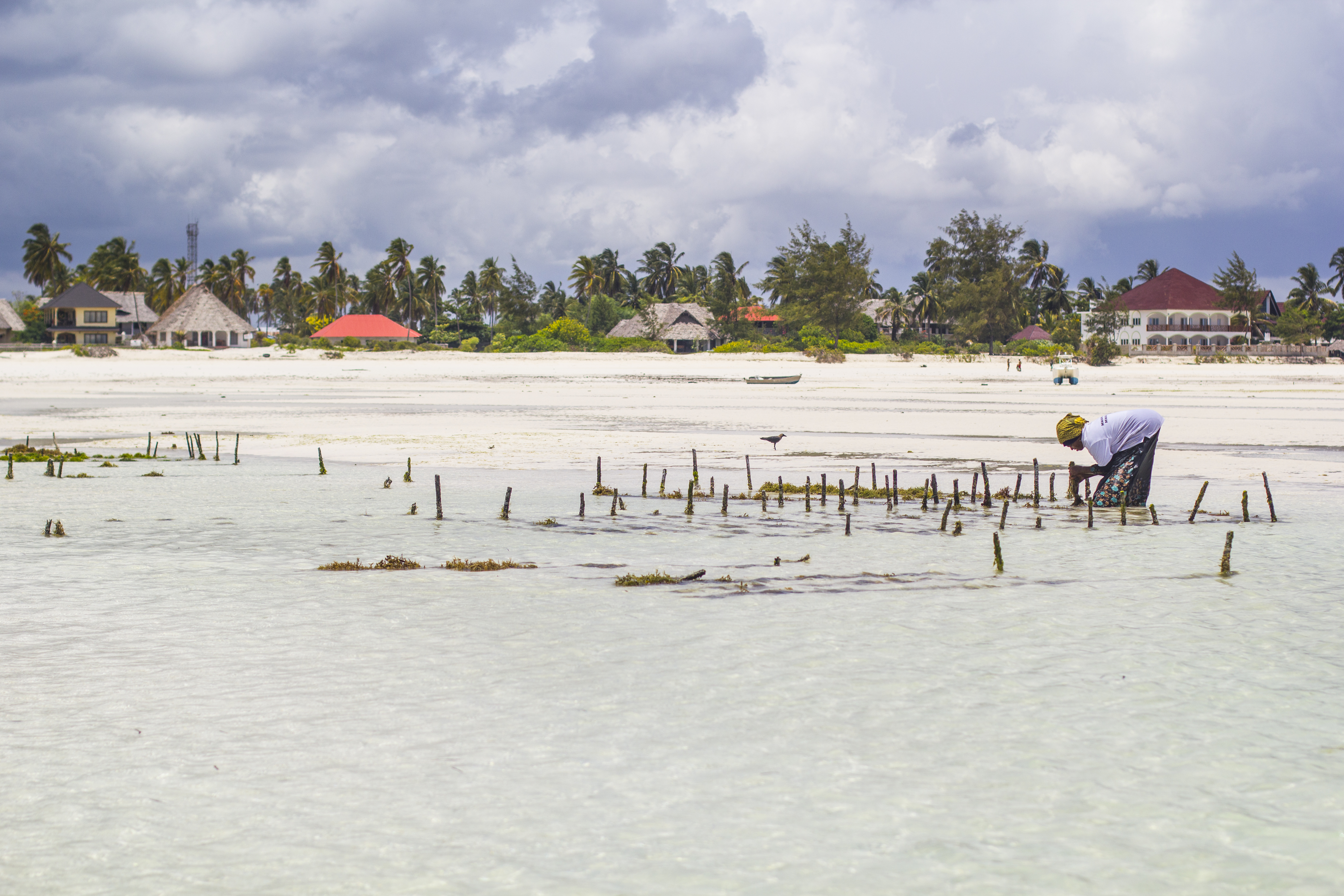
Zanzibar's seaweed growers face a changing climate. Here, a farmer tends to her farm in Paje, on the southeast coast of the island.

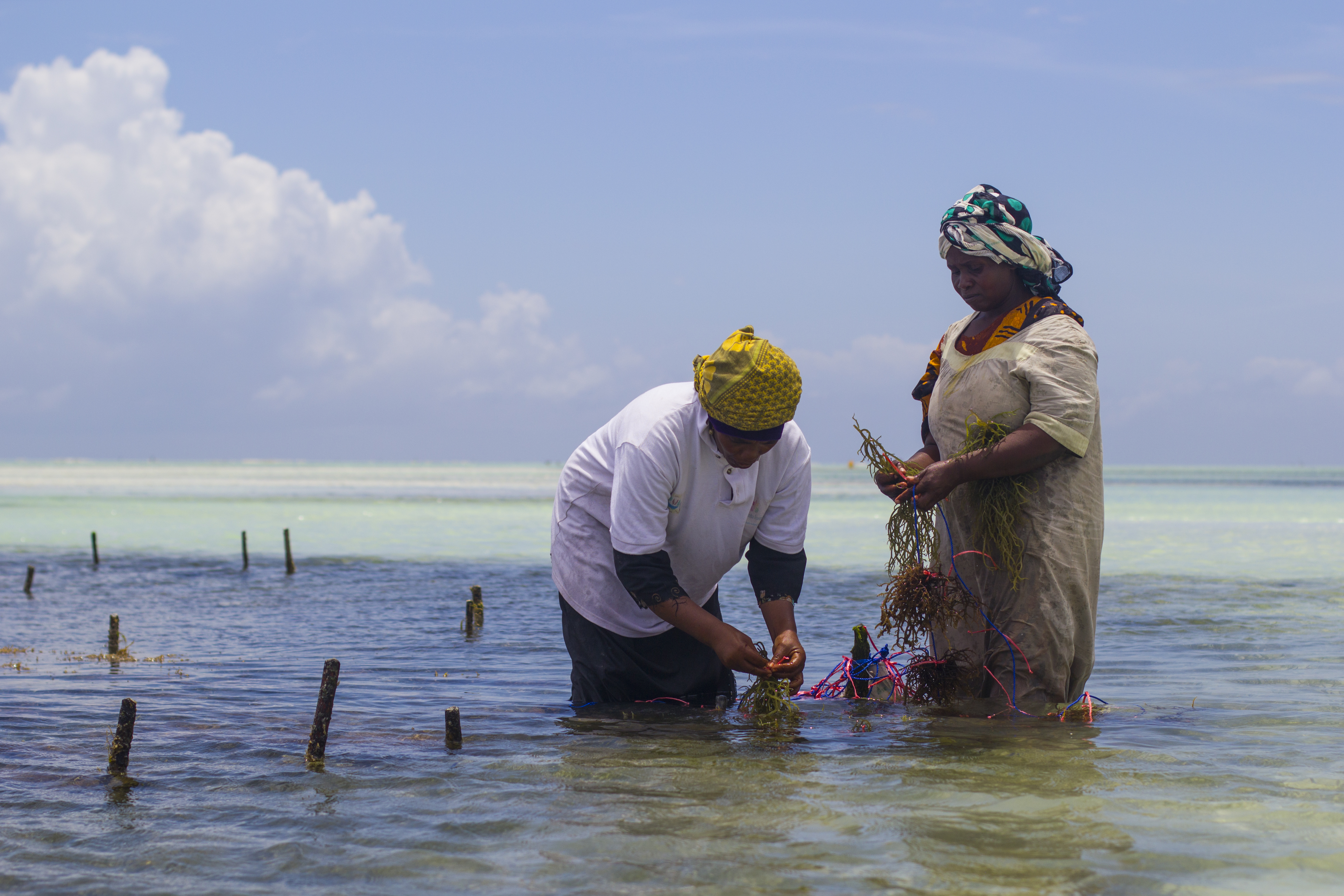
Mwanaisha Makame and Mashavu Rum, who have been farming seaweed on Zanzibar island for 20 years, wade through the low tide to their farm.

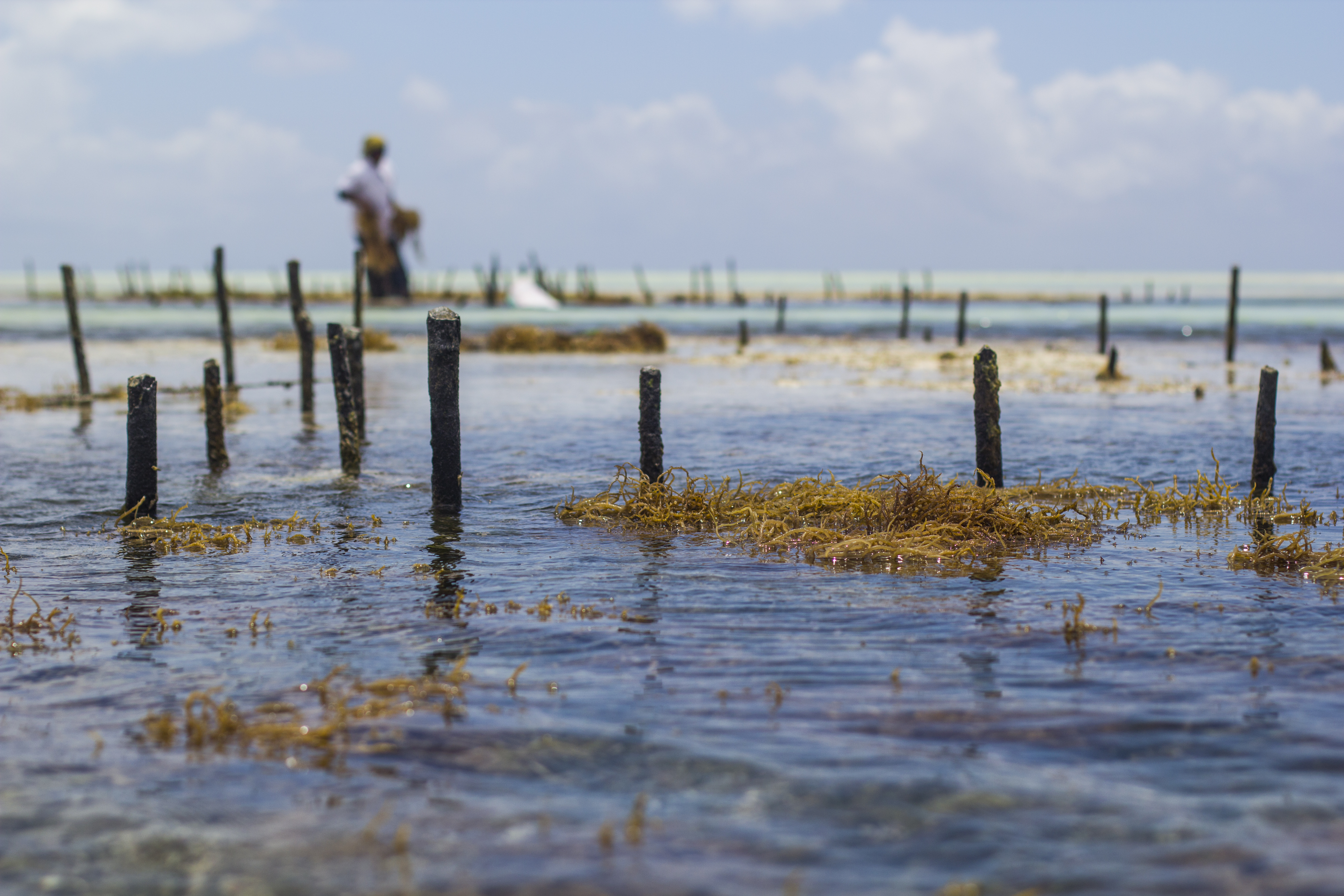
The seaweed grows underwater for 45 days. When it reaches one kilogram it is picked and dried, then packed in bags to be exported to countries like China, Korea, and Vietnam. There, it is used in medicines and shampoos.

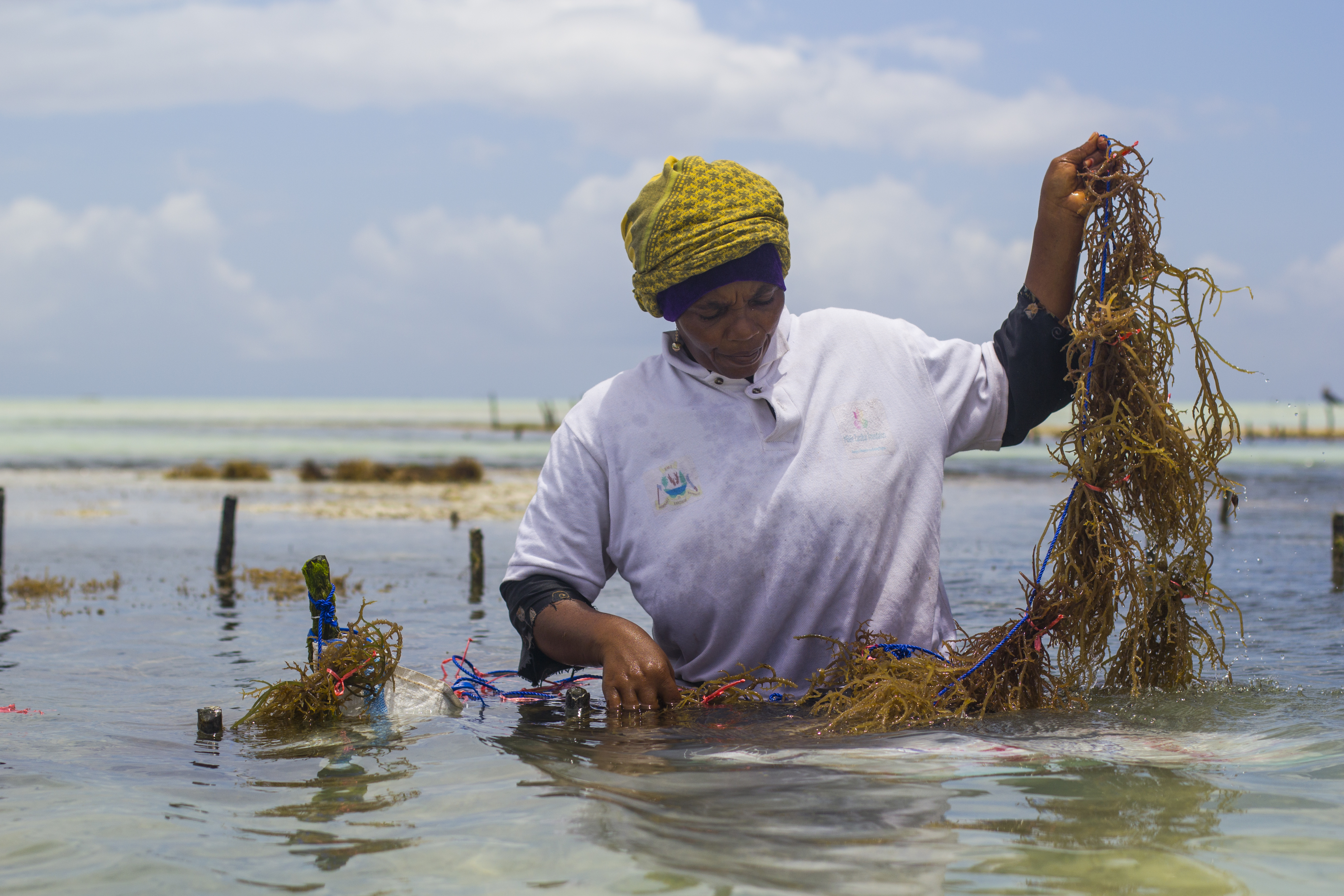
The farmers have a lot of problems due to climate change. Two decades ago, 450 seaweed farmers roamed Paje. Now, only about 150 farmers remain.

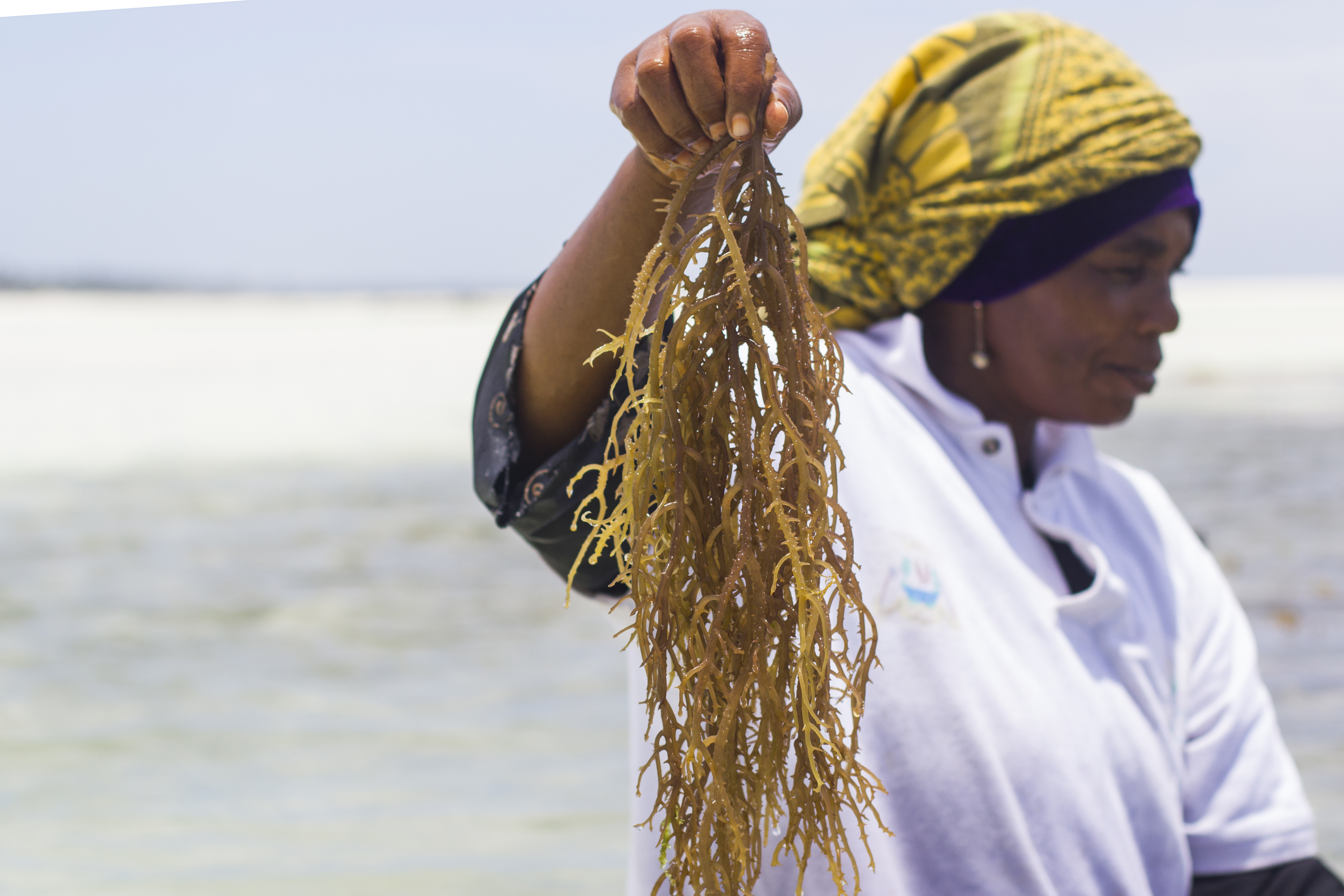
Mwanaisha holds up a healthy clump of seaweed. Then she holds up seaweed the farmers will not be able to use. A hard white substance grows on it—ice-ice disease, caused by higher ocean temperatures and intense sunlight.

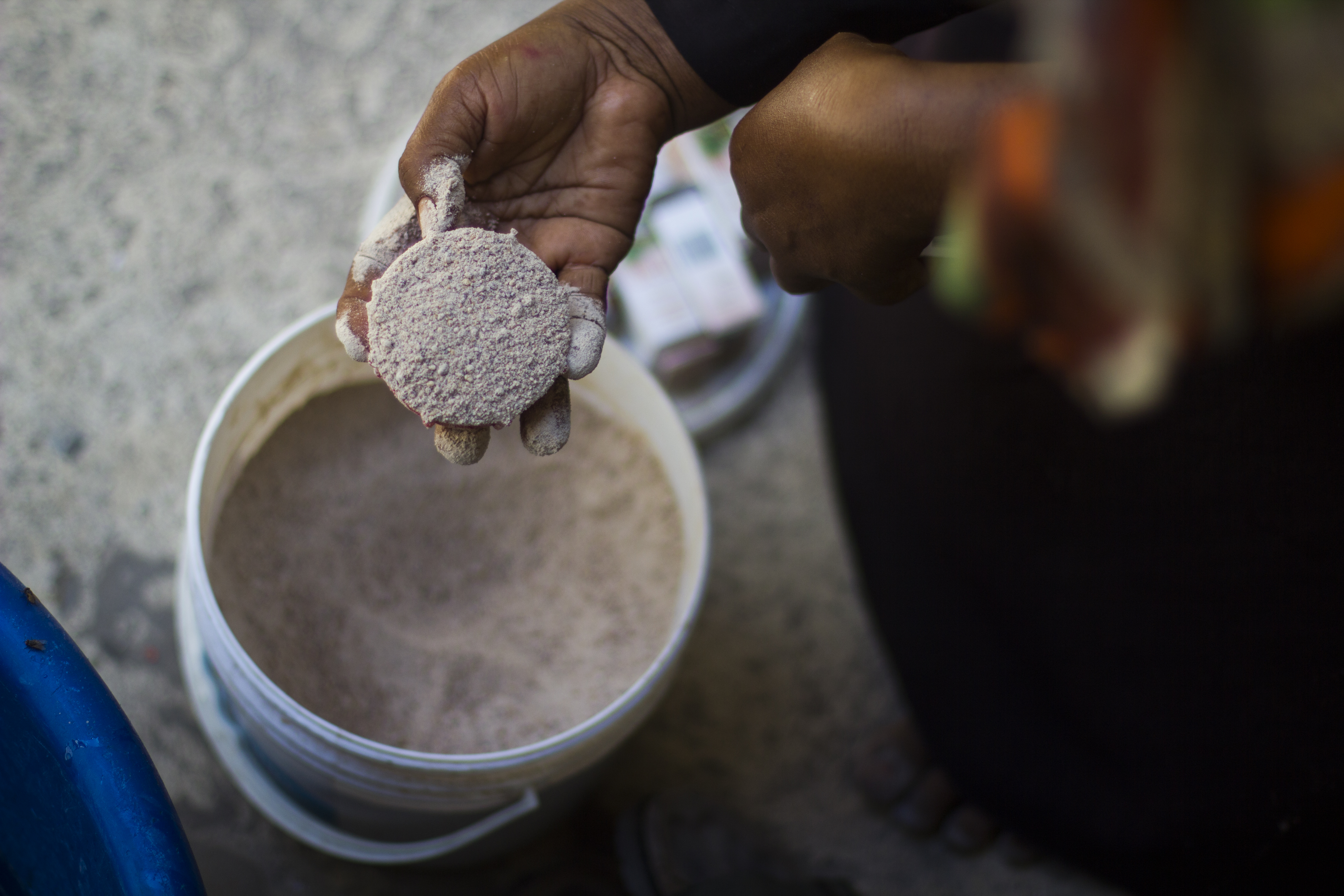
The seaweed farmers learned how to make soap from their seaweed at the Zanzibar Seaweed Center, a business that started as an NGO in 2009. At their homes, they mix water, ground seaweed powder, coconut oil, caustic soda, and essential oils in a large plastic tub.

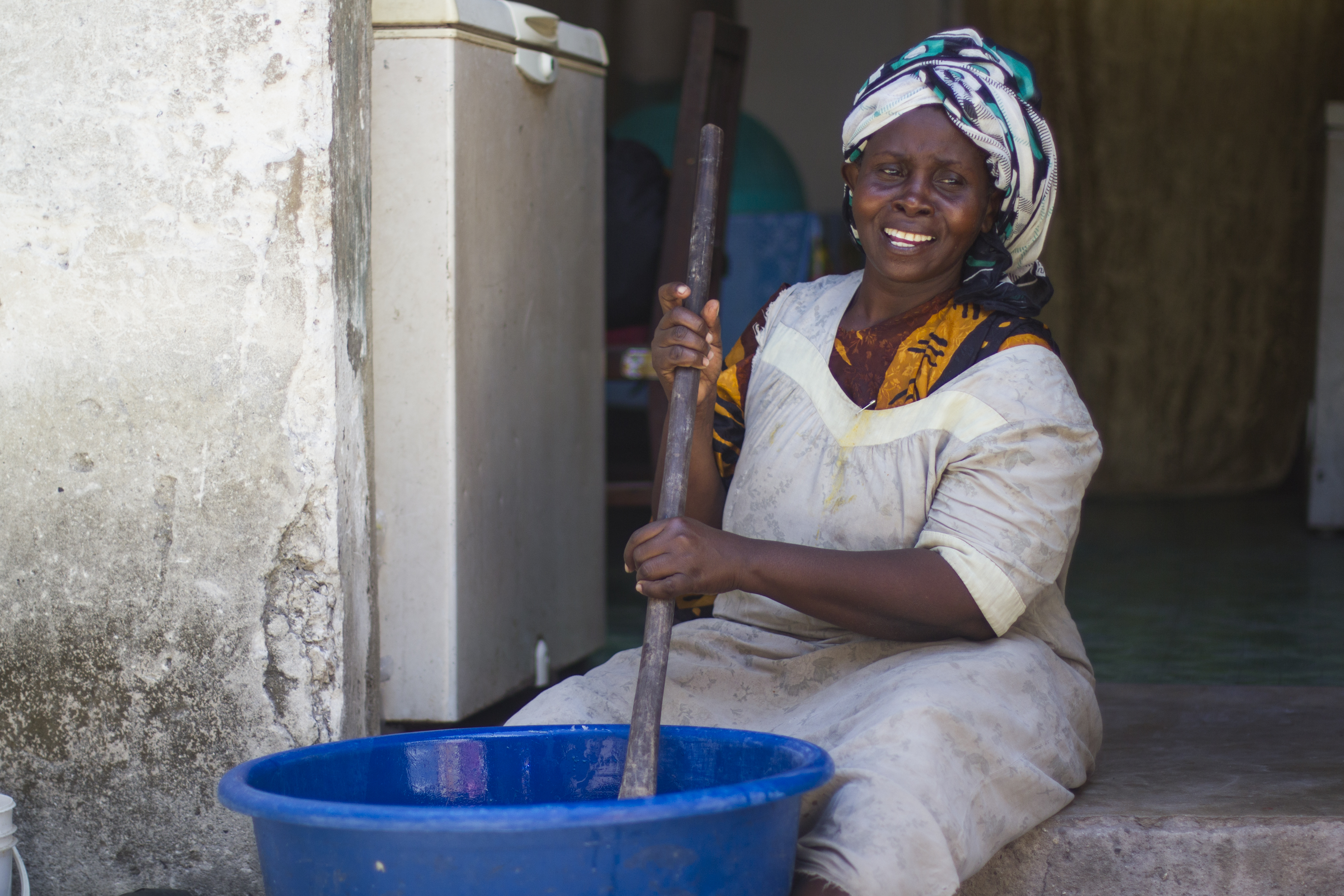
Later in the week, the seaweed farmers will sell their finished soaps in Zanzibar town or to regular local customers. As seaweed levels decline, they have found a way to increase the value of their work.

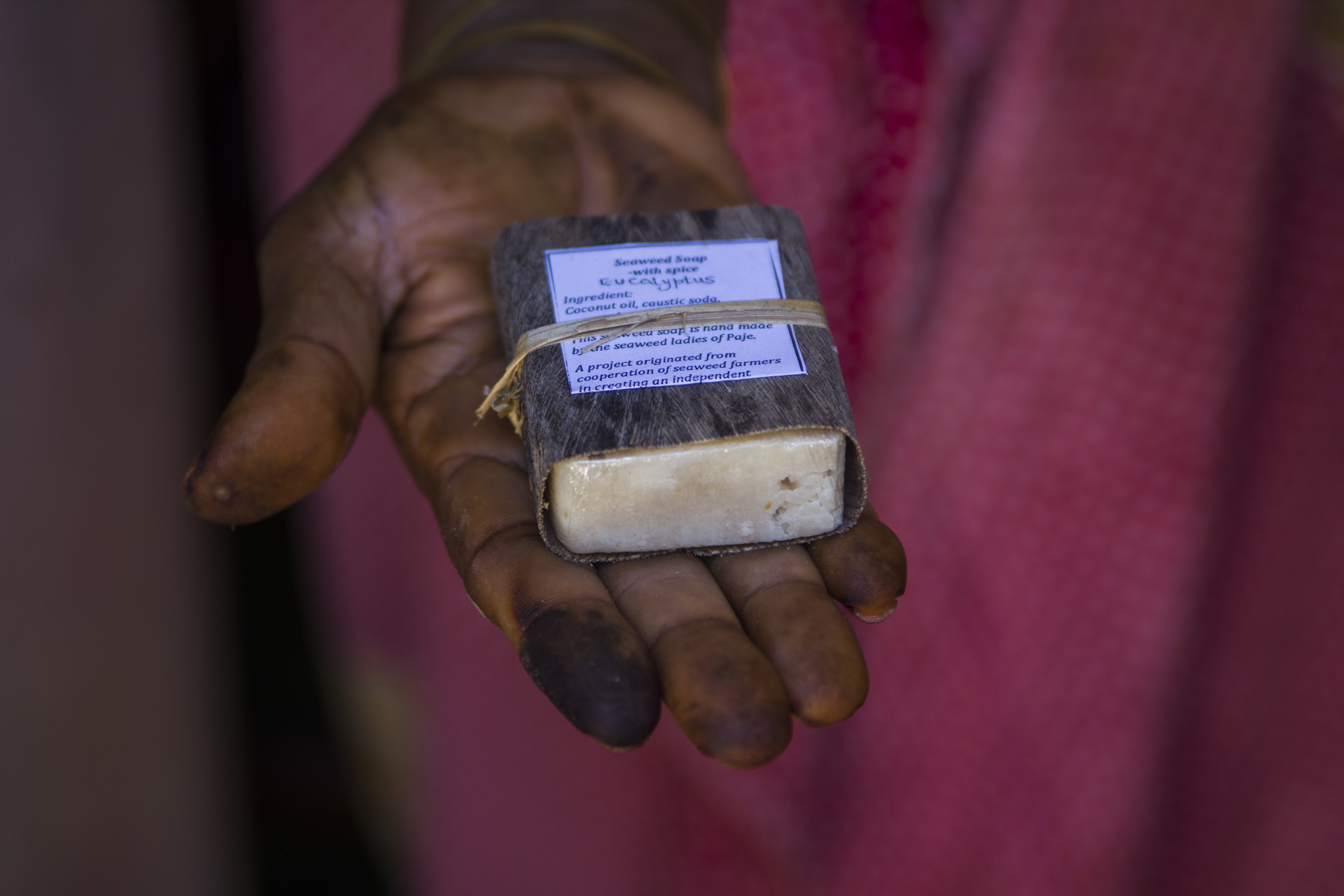
The finished product—a bar of seaweed soap

== Uses ==
Farmed seaweed is used in industrial products, as food, as an ingredient in animal feed, and as source material for biofuels.

=== Chemicals ===
Seaweeds are used to produce chemicals that can be used for various industrial, pharmaceutical, or food products. Two major derivative products are carrageenan and agar. Bioactive ingredients can be used for industries such as pharmaceuticals, industrial food, and cosmetics.

==== Carrageenan ====
Carrageenans or carrageenins (/ˌkærəˈɡiːnɪns/ KARR-ə-GHEE-nins; from Irish carraigín 'sea moss') are a variety of natural linear sulfated polysaccharides. They are extracted from red edible seaweeds, of the family Solieriaceae. Carrageenans are widely used in the food industry for their gelling, thickening, and stabilizing properties. Their main application is in dairy and meat products, due to their strong binding to food proteins. Carrageenans have emerged as a promising candidate in tissue engineering and regenerative medicine applications as they resemble animal glycosaminoglycans (GAGs). They are used for tissue engineering, wound coverage, and drug delivery.

==== Agar ====
Agar (/ˈeɪɡɑːr/ or /ˈɑːɡər/), or agar-agar, is a jelly-like substance consisting of polysaccharides obtained from the cell walls of some species of red algae (phylum Rhodophyta) primarily from the Gracilaria genus (Irish moss, ogonori) and the Gelidiaceae family (tengusa). These algae are known as agarophytes.

=== Food ===
Edible seaweeds are seaweeds that can be eaten and used for culinary purposes. They typically contain high amounts of fiber. They may belong to one of several groups of multicellular algae: the red algae, green algae, and brown algae. Seaweeds are also harvested or cultivated for the extraction of polysaccharides such as alginate, agar and carrageenan, gelatinous substances collectively known as hydrocolloids or phycocolloids. Hydrocolloids have attained commercial significance, especially in food production as food additives. The food industry exploits the gelling, water-retention, emulsifying and other physical properties of these hydrocolloids.

=== Fuel ===
Algae fuel, algal biofuel, or algal oil is an alternative to liquid fossil fuels that use algae as the source of energy-rich oils. Also, algae fuels are an alternative to commonly known biofuel sources, such as corn and sugarcane. When made from seaweed (macroalgae) it can be known as seaweed fuel or seaweed oil. These fuels have no practical significance but remain an aspirational target in the biofuels research area.

=== Climate change mitigation ===
Seaweed cultivation in the open ocean can act as a form of carbon sequestration to mitigate climate change. Studies have reported that nearshore seaweed forests constitute a source of blue carbon, as seaweed detritus is carried into the middle and deep ocean thereby sequestering carbon. Macrocystis pyrifera (also known as giant kelp) sequesters carbon faster than any other species. It can reach 60 m (200 ft) in length and grow as rapidly as 50 cm (20 in) a day. According to one study, covering 9% of the world's oceans with kelp forests could produce "sufficient biomethane to replace all of today's needs in fossil fuel energy, while removing 53 billion tons of CO_{2} per year from the atmosphere, restoring pre-industrial levels".

Seaweed farming may be an initial step towards adapting to and mitigating climate change. These include shoreline protection through the dissipation of wave energy, which is especially important to mangrove shorelines. Carbon dioxide intake would raise pH locally, benefitting calcifiers (e.g. crustaceans) or in reducing coral bleaching. Finally, seaweed farming could provide oxygen input to coastal waters, thus countering ocean deoxygenation driven by rising ocean temperature.

Tim Flannery claimed that growing seaweeds in the open ocean, facilitated by artificial upwelling and substrate, can enable carbon sequestration if seaweeds are sunk to depths greater than one kilometer.

Seaweed contributes approximately 16–18.7% of the total marine-vegetation sink. In 2010 there were 19.2 × $10^6$ tons of aquatic plants worldwide, 6.8 × $10^6$ tons for brown seaweeds; 9.0 × $10^6$ tons for red seaweeds; 0.2 × $10^6$ tons of green seaweeds; and 3.2 × $10^6$ tons of miscellaneous aquatic plants. Seaweed is largely transported from coastal areas to the open and deep ocean, acting as a permanent storage of carbon biomass within marine sediments.

Ocean afforestation is a proposal for farming seaweed for carbon removal. After harvesting seaweed is decomposed into biogas (60% methane and 40% carbon dioxide) in an anaerobic digester. The methane can be used as a biofuel, while the carbon dioxide can be stored to keep it from the atmosphere.

Without explicit human support, seaweed has been expanding its footprint across the oceans, accelerating beginning in 2008-2010, increasing 13.4%/yr since then.

=== Marine permaculture ===
Similarly, the NGO Climate Foundation and permaculture experts claimed that offshore seaweed ecosystems can be cultivated according to permaculture principles, constituting marine permaculture. The concept envisions using artificial upwelling and floating, submerged platforms as substrate to replicate natural seaweed ecosystems that provide habitat and the basis of a trophic pyramid for marine life. Seaweeds and fish can be sustainably harvested. As of 2020, successful trials had taken place in Hawaii, the Philippines, Puerto Rico and Tasmania. The idea featured as a solution covered by the documentary 2040 and in the book Drawdown: The Most Comprehensive Plan Ever Proposed to Reverse Global Warming.

== History ==
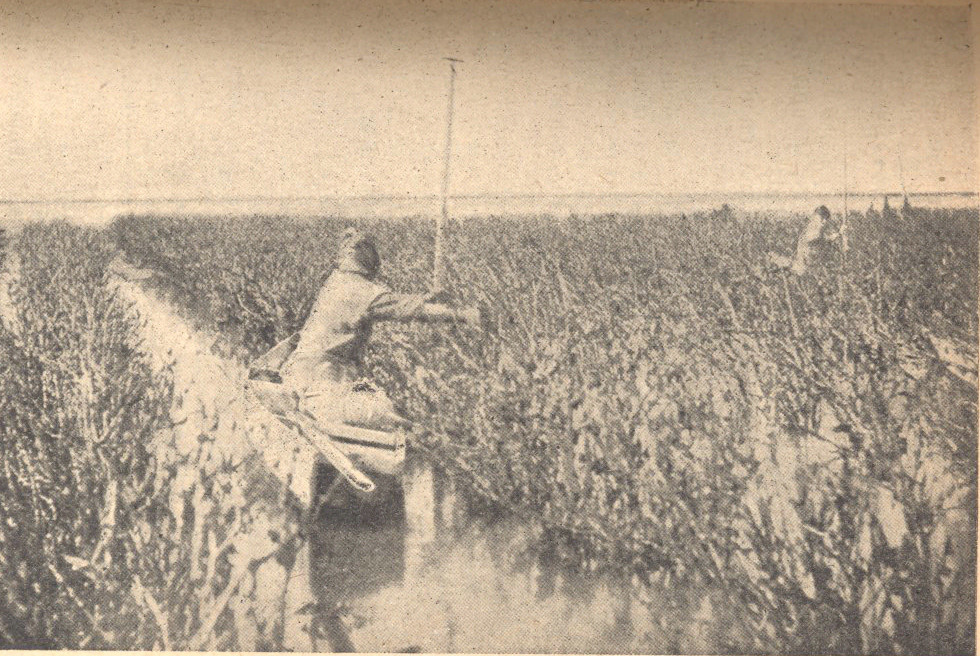
Bundles of brush in the Tama River estuary used for growing Porphyra algae in Japan, c. 1921

Human use of seaweed is known from the Neolithic period. Cultivation of gim (laver) in Korea is reported in books from the 15th century. Seaweed farming began in Japan as early as 1670 in Tokyo Bay. In autumn of each year, farmers would throw bamboo branches into shallow, muddy water, where the spores of the seaweed would collect. A few weeks later these branches would be moved to a river estuary. Nutrients from the river helped the seaweed to grow.

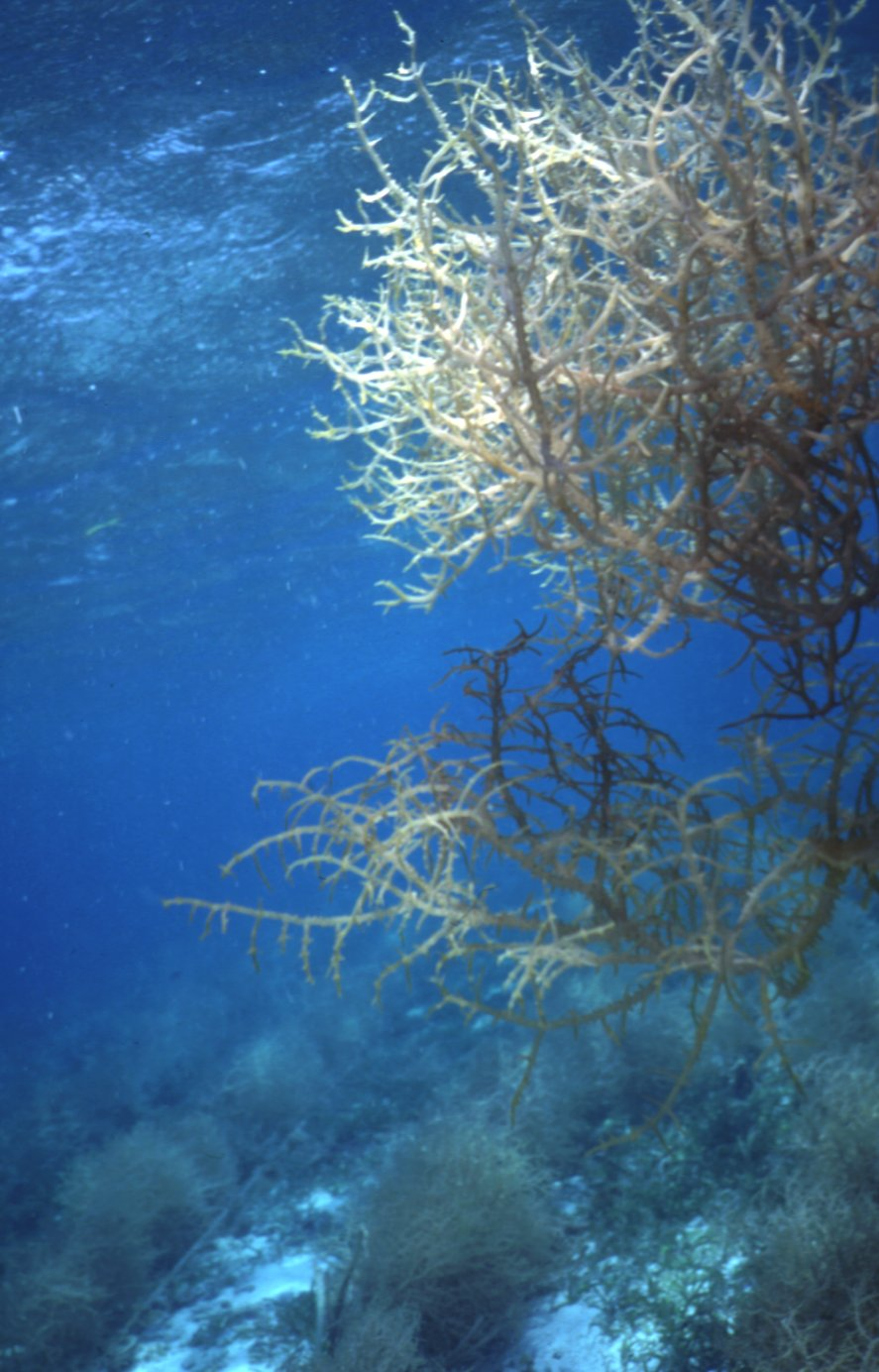
Eucheuma farming in the Philippines

In the 1940s, the Japanese improved this method by placing nets of synthetic material tied to bamboo poles. This effectively doubled production. A cheaper variant of this method is called the hibi method—ropes stretched between bamboo poles. In the early 1970s, demand for seaweed and seaweed products outstripped supply, and cultivation was viewed as the best means to increase production.

In the tropics, commercial cultivation of Caulerpa lentillifera (sea grapes) was pioneered in the 1950s in Cebu, Philippines, after accidental introduction of C. lentillifera to fish ponds on the island of Mactan. This was further developed by local research, particularly through the efforts of the Filipino marine biologist Gavino Trono, since recognized as a National Scientist of the Philippines. Local research and experimental cultures led to the development of the first commercial farming methods for other warm-water algae (since cold-water red and brown edible algae favored in East Asia do not grow in the tropics), including the first successful commercial cultivation of carrageenan-producing algae. These include Eucheuma spp., Kappaphycus alvarezii, Gracilaria spp., and Halymenia durvillei. In 1997, it was estimated that 40,000 people in the Philippines made their living through seaweed farming. The Philippines was the world's largest producer of carrageenan for several decades until it was overtaken by Indonesia in 2008.

Seaweed farming spread beyond Japan and the Philippines to southeast Asia, Canada, Great Britain, Spain, and the United States.

In the 2000s, seaweed farming has been getting increasing attention due to its potential for mitigating both climate change and other environmental issues, such as agricultural runoff. Seaweed farming can be mixed with other aquaculture, such as shellfish, to improve water bodies, such as in the practices developed by American non-profit GreenWave. The IPCC Special Report on the Ocean and Cryosphere in a Changing Climate recommends "further research attention" as a mitigation tactic.

In 2024 a commercial-scale seaweed farm began construction within the Hollandse Kust Zuid (HKZ) 139 turbine wind farm. The project uses 13-metre long "Eco-anchors" that cover the surface with a marine life habitat using materials such as oyster shells, wood, and cork.

In 2025 the Food Policy Institute recommended a series of policies that would aid with commercialising seaweed growth in the United Kingdom.

== See also ==
- Seaweed fertilizer
- Algaculture
- Aquaculture of giant kelp
- Natural resources of island countries
- Seaweed cultivator

== Sources ==
This article incorporates text from a free content work. Licensed under CC BY-SA 3.0 IGO (license statement/permission). Text taken from In brief, The State of World Fisheries and Aquaculture, 2018, FAO, FAO.

- Ask, E.I (1990). Cottonii and Spinosum Cultivation Handbook. FMC BioPolymer Corporation.Philippines.
- Borgese, Elisabeth Mann (1980). Seafarm: the story of aquaculture. Harry N. Abrams, Incorporated, New York. ISBN 0-8109-1604-5.
- Crawford, B.R (2002). Seaweed farming :An Alternative Livelihood for Small-Scale Fishers?. Proyek Pesisir Publication. University of Rhode Island, Coastal Resources Center, Narragansett, Rhode Island, USA.
- Naylor, J (1976). Production, trade and utilization of seaweeds and seaweed products. FAO Fisheries Technical Paper No. 159. Rome: Food and Agriculture Organization of the United Nations.
- Pollnac, R.B; et al. (1997a). Rapid Assessment of Coastal Management Issues on the Coast of Minahasa. Proyek Pesisir Technical Report No: TE-97/01-E. Coastal Resources Center, University of Rhode Island, Narragansett, Rhode Island, USA.
- Pollnac, R.B; et al. (1997b). Baseline Assessment of Socioeconomic Aspects of Resources Use in the Coastal Zone of Bentenan and Tumbak. Proyek Pesisir Technical Report No: TE-97/01-E. Coastal Resources Center, University of Rhode Island, Narragansett, Rhode Island, USA.
- Trono, G.C (1990). Seaweed resources in the developing countries of Asia: production and socioeconomic implications. Aquaculture Department, Southeast Asia Fisheries Development Center. Tigbauan, Iloilo, Philippines.
- Zertruche-Gonzalez, Jose A. (1997). Coral Reefs: Challenges and Opportunities for Sustainable Management. The World Bank. ISBN 0-8213-4235-5.
