= Gavino Trono =

Filipino biologist (born 1931)

Gavino C. Trono Jr. ONS
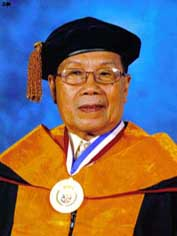
- Official portrait, National Academy of Science and Technology
- Born: November 11, 1931 (age 94); Philippines
- Education: University of the Philippines Diliman (BS); De La Salle Araneta University (MS); University of Hawaiʻi at Mānoa (PhD)
- Known for: Seaweed Farming
- Awards: Order of National Scientists of the Philippines (2014)
- Scientific career
- Fields: Biology

Gavino Trono Jr. (born November 11, 1931) is a Filipino marine biologist dubbed as the "Father of Kappaphycus farming". He was conferred the rank of National Scientist of the Philippines for contributions to the study of tropical marine phycology, focusing on seaweed biodiversity. He is currently a professor emeritus of the University of the Philippines Marine Science Institute.

== Education and career ==
Trono obtained his Bachelor of Science degree in botany from the University of the Philippines Diliman, his master's degree in agricultural botany from the Araneta University and his doctorate in (marine) botany from the University of Hawaiʻi at Mānoa in 1968 while working in the laboratory of Maxwell Stanford Doty. Trono’s dissertation is considered as among the most important body of work on the diversity and ecology of algae in Micronesia. In the resulting publications, he described 11 new seaweed taxa from the area, 8 of which (i.e., Avrainvillea hollenbergii Trono, Boodleopsis carolinensis Trono, Ceramium koronense Trono, Chlorodesmis dotyi Trono, Derbesia padinae Trono, Microdictyon mokilensis Trono, Spyridia velasquezii Trono, Sphacelaria carolinensis Trono) are currently accepted taxonomically.His research focuses on seaweeds including studies on the culture of Eucheuma denticulatum, Kappaphycus alvarezii, Gracilaria spp., Caulerpa lentillifera, and Halymenia durvillei for coastal communities. He wrote an academic paper reporting the occurrence of ice-ice disease that had affected seaweed farms. This disease devastated the commercial production of seaweed in the Philippines. The seaweed is farmed for the food additive carrageenan.

Trono led the assessment of several coastal areas in Western Mindanao as potential sites for seaweed farms; and discovered twenty-five (25) new marine benthic algae. He also established the largest phycological herbarium in the country – the G.T. Velasquez Herbarium in the University of the Philippines Diliman’s Marine Science Institute and authored two-volume books on Field Guide and Atlas of the Seaweed Resources of the Philippines, considered as the most authoritative books in the country on the seaweed flora.

Trono was conferred the rank of National Scientist of the Philippines in 2014 by Benigno Aquino III, the President of the Philippines. This award has been made to just over thirty leading scientists and this gives them a pension of life as well as a seat at important national ceremonies. The award was for his contributions to tropical marine phycology, focusing on seaweed biodiversity.

== Awards and recognition ==
- National Scientist of the Philippines for Marine Biology in 2014
- Academician by the National Academy of Science and Technology (NAST) in 2008
- Plaque of Recognition from the Asia Pacific Society of Applied Phycology in 2006
- University of the Philippines Alumni Award in 1979
- “Likas Yaman Award” from the Ministry of Natural Resources (now Department of Environment and Natural Resources) in 1978
- To honor his contribution to phycology, two seaweed taxa—the red seaweed species Chondrophycus tronoi (Ganzon-Fortes) K.W.Nam and the brown seaweed genus Tronoella Santiañez & Kogame—were named after Dr. Trono, immortalizing him in the world of natural history sciences

== See also ==
- Seaweed farming
