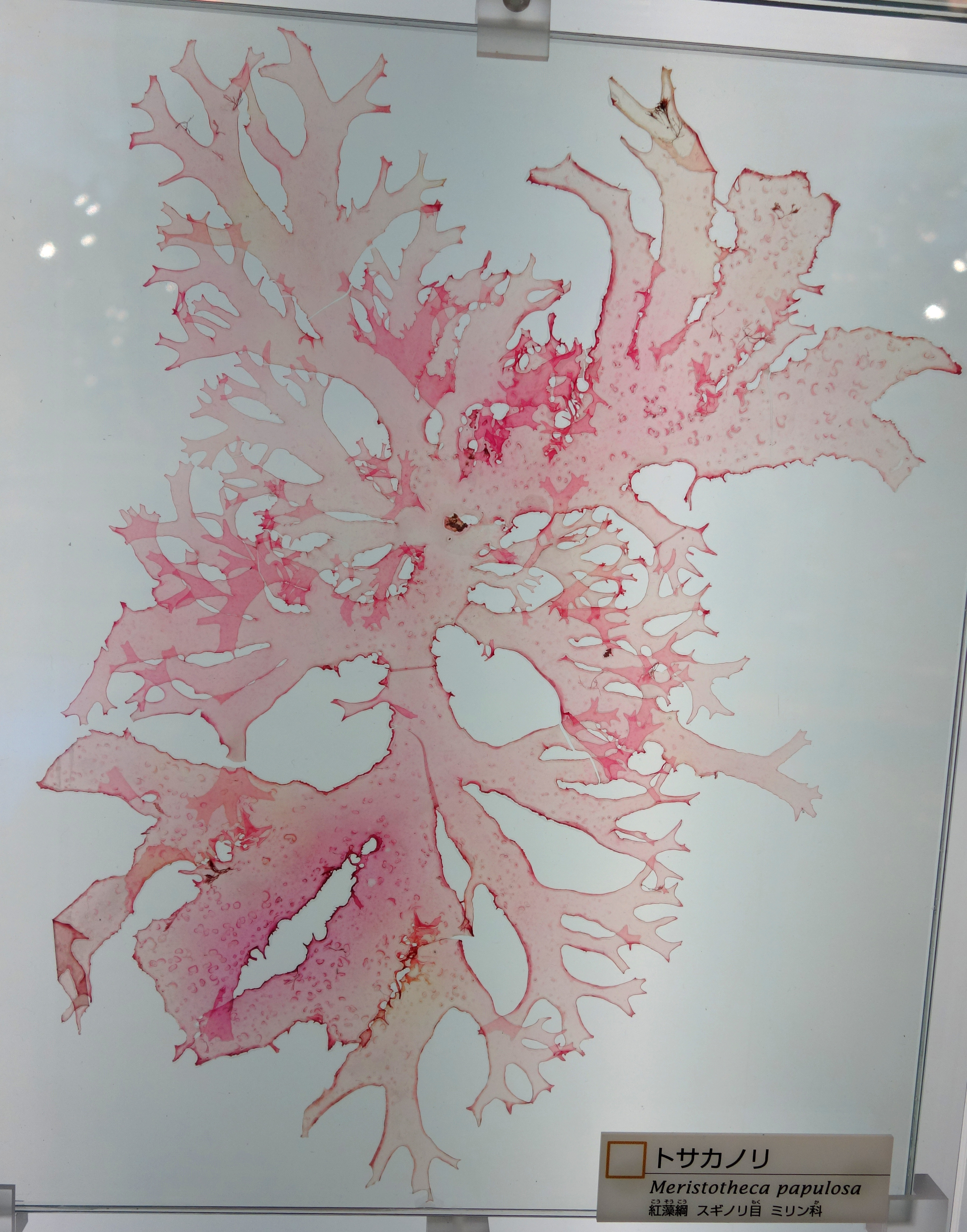

Scientific classification
- Clade: Archaeplastida
- Division: Rhodophyta
- Class: Florideophyceae
- Order: Gigartinales
- Family: Solieriaceae
- Genus: Meristotheca; J.Agardh

Species
- M. coacta Okamura; M. dakaraensis Faye & Masuda; M. decumbens Grunow; M. fergusonii Grunow ex Mazza; M. floridana Kylin; M. papulosa (Montagne) J. Agardh; M. procumbens P.W. Gabrielson & Kraft; M. tobagensis W.R. Taylor

= Meristotheca =

Genus of algae

Meristotheca is a widely distributed genus of red algae some of whose species are eaten as edible seaweed. In particular, the type species, M. papulosa is a popular vegetable in Taiwan and Japan.
