= Kappaphycus striatus =

Scientific classification
- Domain: Eukaryota
- Clade: Archaeplastida
- Division: Rhodophyta
- Class: Florideophyceae
- Order: Gigartinales
- Family: Solieriaceae
- Genus: Kappaphycus
- Species: K. striatus

Binomial name
- Kappaphycus striatus (F.Schmitz) Doty ex P.C.Silva, 1996

Synonyms
- Eucheuma striatum F.Schmitz, 1895

Species of alga

Kappaphycus striatus is a red algae in the family Solieriaceae. Its scientific name derives from the Latin word meaning "striped" or "fluted". It is cultivated extensively in many tropical areas of the world and is a common source for κ-carrageenan extraction.
