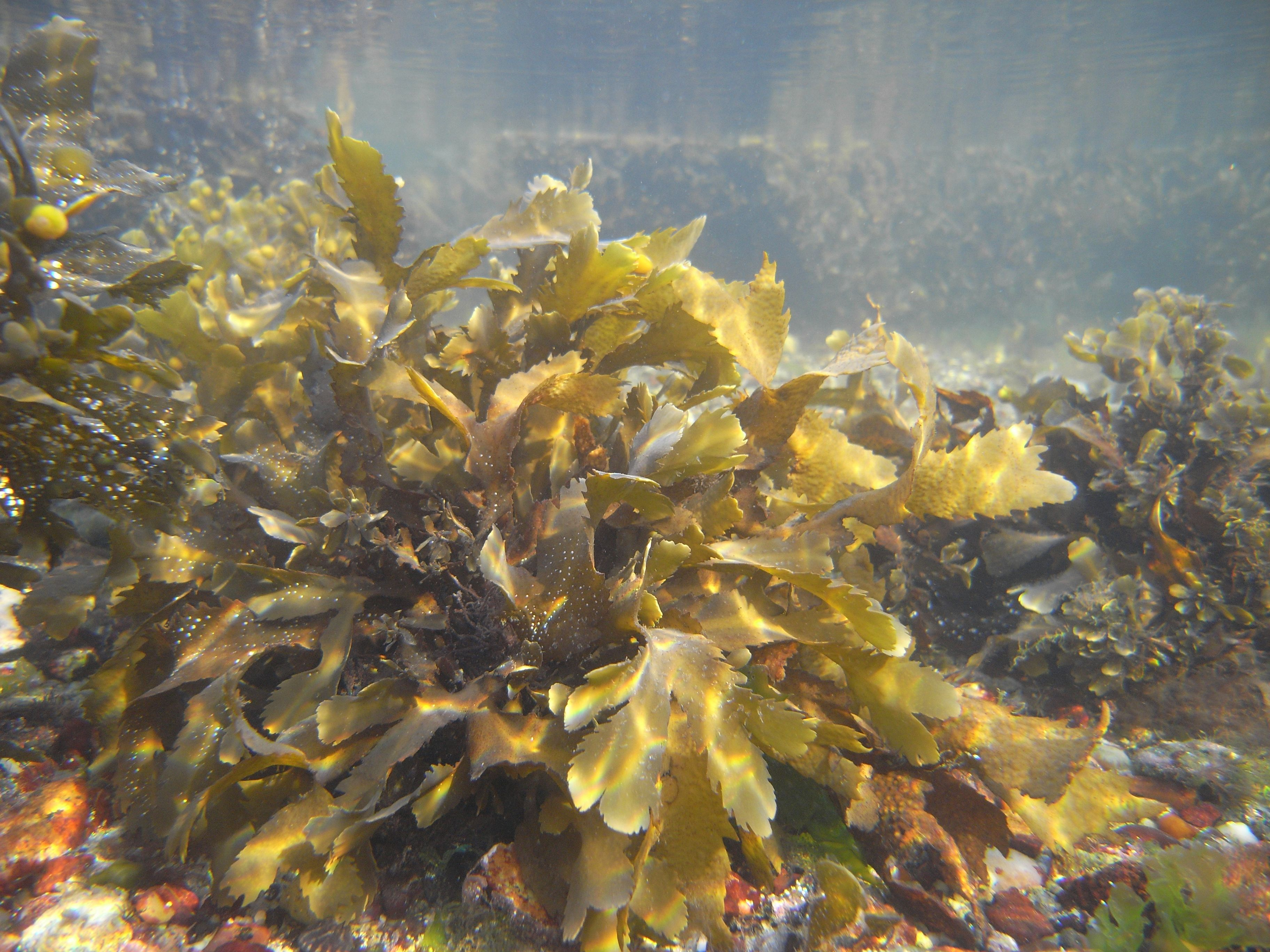
- Fucus serratus

Scientific classification

Seaweeds can be found in the following groups
- Chlorophyta (green algae); Phaeophyceae (brown algae); Phaeothamniophyceae; Chrysophyceae (gold algae); Rhodophyta (red algae)

Cladistically included but traditionally excluded taxa
- All other bacteria; All other eukaryotes; All archaeans

= Seaweed =

Seaweed Informal group of macroscopic marine algae Temporal range: 1000–0 Ma

Macroscopic marine algae

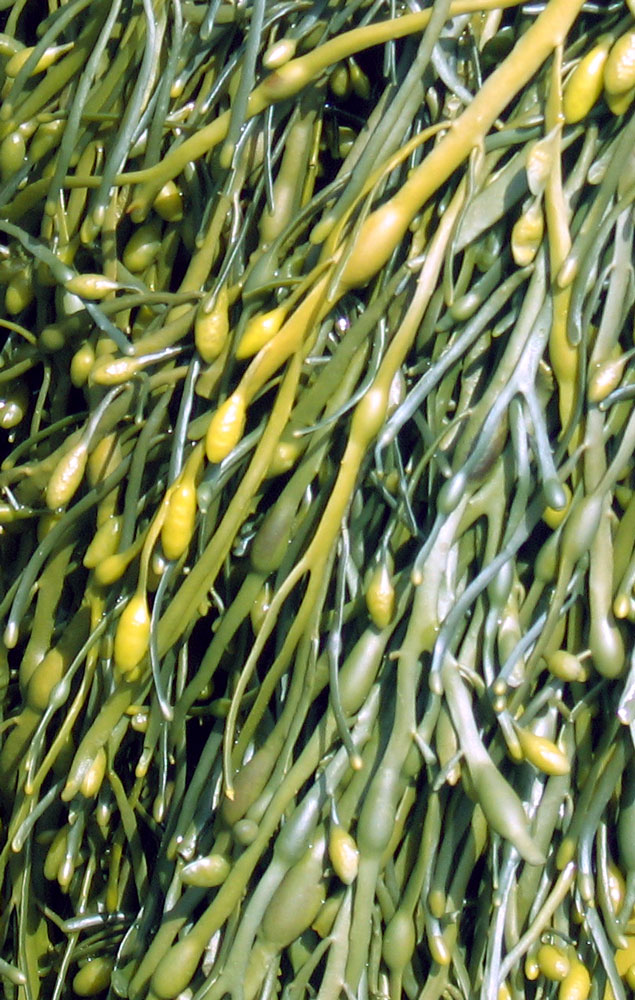
Ascophyllum nodosum exposed to the sun in Nova Scotia, Canada

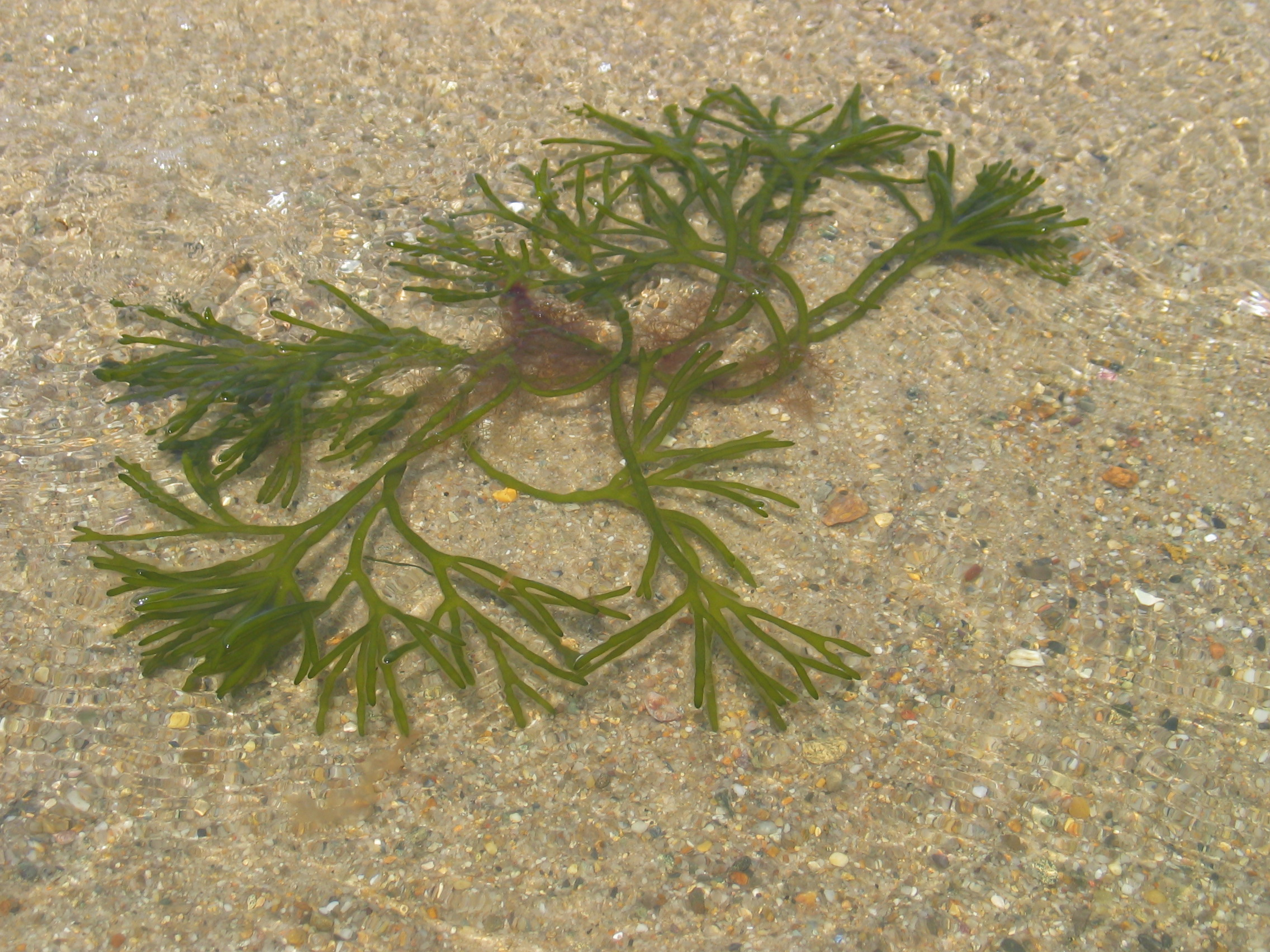
Dead man's fingers (Codium fragile) off the Massachusetts coast in the United States

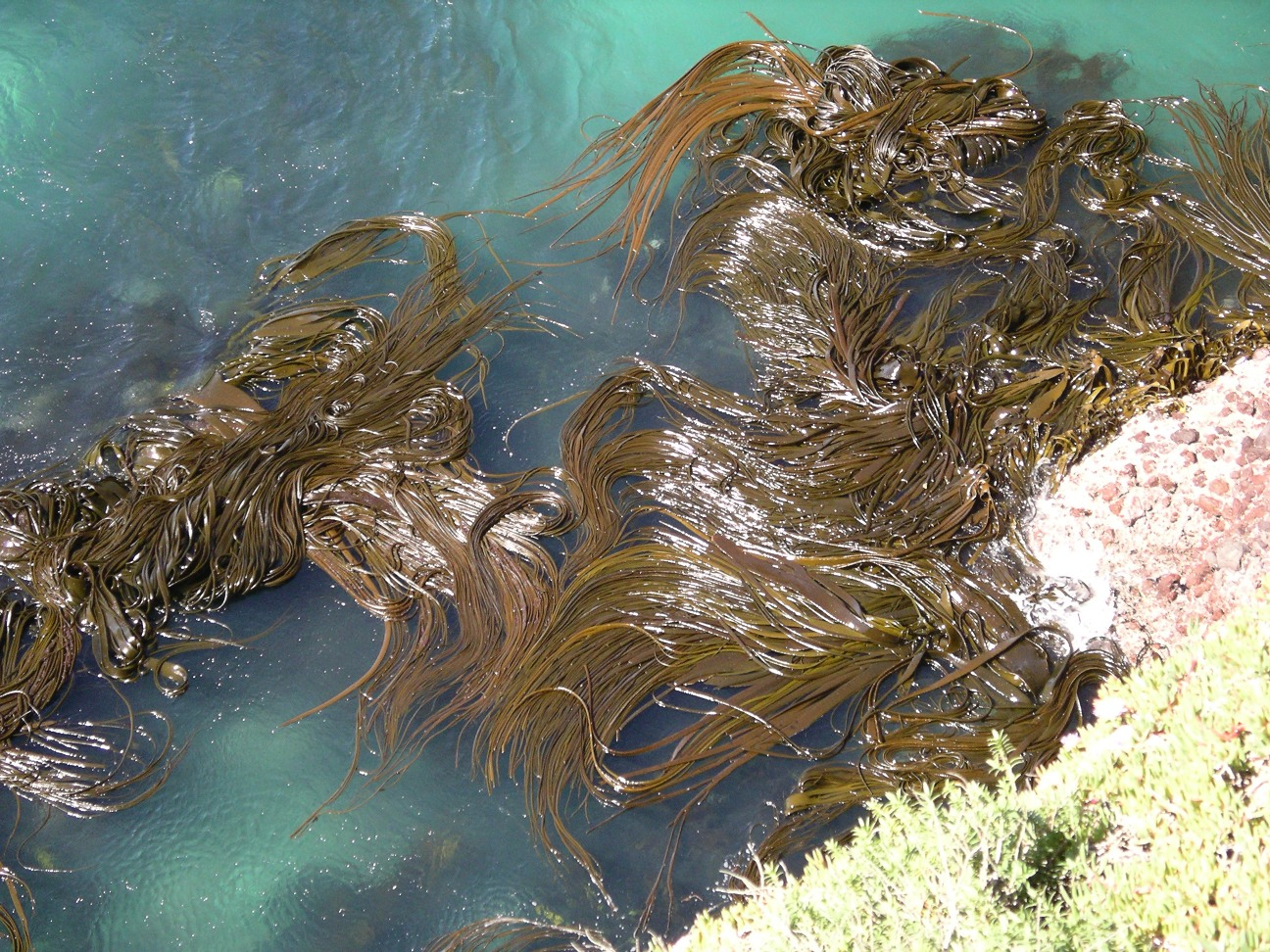
The top of a kelp forest in Otago, New Zealand

Seaweed, or macroalgae, refers to thousands of species of macroscopic, multicellular, marine algae. The term includes some types of Rhodophyta (red), Phaeophyta (brown) and Chlorophyta (green) macroalgae. Seaweed species such as kelps provide essential nursery habitat for fisheries and other marine species and thus protect food sources; other species, such as planktonic algae, play a vital role in capturing carbon and producing at least 50% of Earth's oxygen.

Natural seaweed ecosystems are sometimes under threat from human activity. For example, mechanical dredging of kelp destroys the resource and dependent fisheries. Other forces also threaten some seaweed ecosystems; for example, a wasting disease in predators of purple urchins has led to an urchin population surge which has destroyed large kelp forest regions off the coast of California.

Humans have a long history of cultivating seaweeds for their uses. In recent years, seaweed farming has become a global agricultural practice, providing food, source material for various chemical uses (such as carrageenan), cattle feeds and fertilizers. Due to their importance in marine ecologies and for absorbing carbon dioxide, recent attention has been on cultivating seaweeds as a potential climate change mitigation strategy for biosequestration of carbon dioxide, alongside other benefits like nutrient pollution reduction, increased habitat for coastal aquatic species, and reducing local ocean acidification. The IPCC Special Report on the Ocean and Cryosphere in a Changing Climate recommends "further research attention" for the purpose of mitigation.

== Taxonomy ==
"Seaweed" lacks a formal definition, but seaweed generally lives in the ocean and is visible to the naked eye. The term refers to both flowering plants submerged in the ocean, like eelgrass, as well as larger marine algae. Generally, it is one of several groups of multicellular algae; red, green and brown. They lack one common multicellular ancestor, forming a polyphyletic group. In addition, blue-green algae (Cyanobacteria) are occasionally considered in seaweed literature.

The number of seaweed species is still a topic of discussion among scientists, but it is most likely that there are several thousand species of seaweed.

=== Genera ===
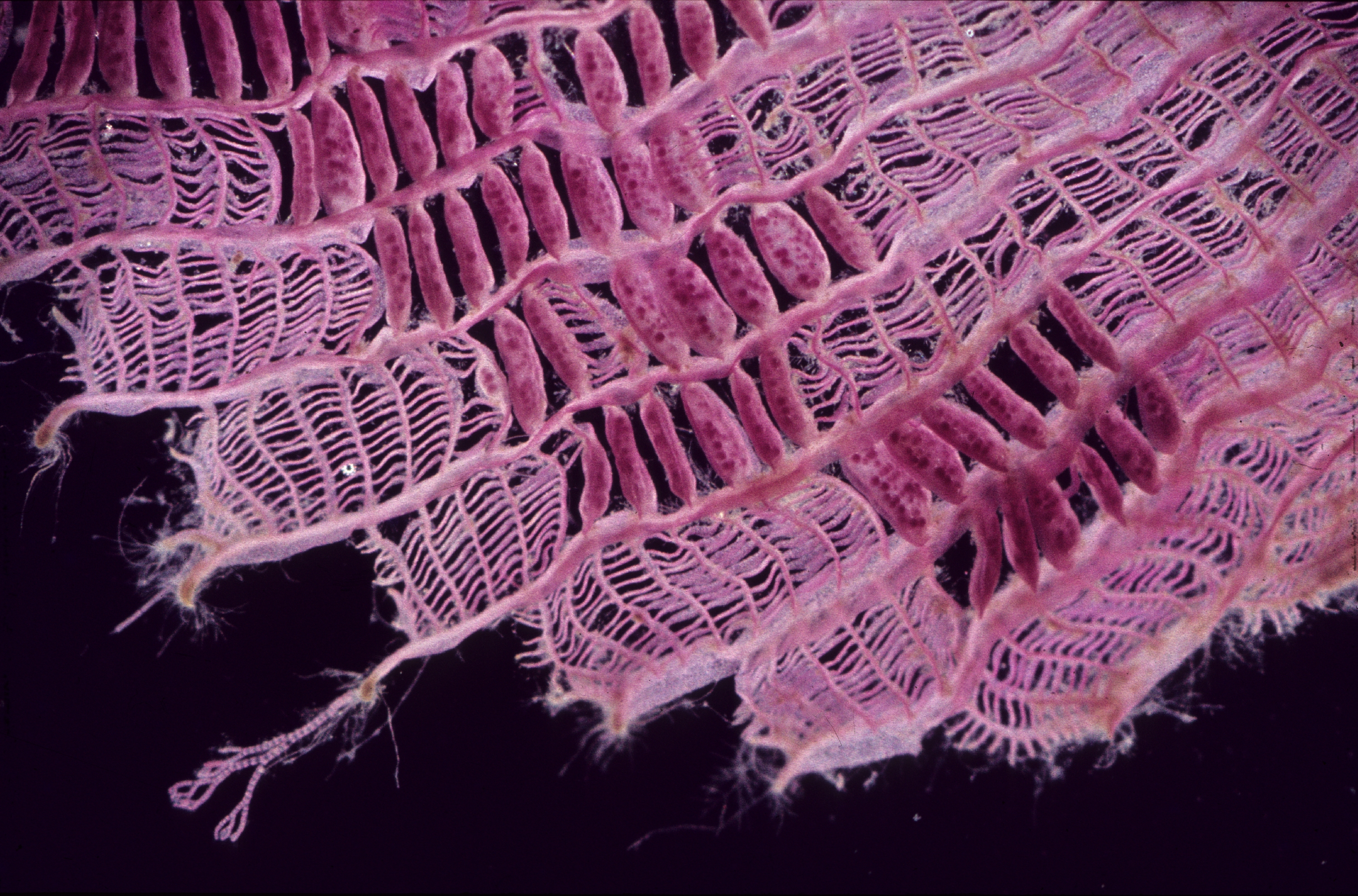
Claudea elegans tetrasporangia

The following table lists a few examples of genera of seaweed.

Genus	Algae Phylum	Remarks
Caulerpa	Green	Submerged.
Fucus	Brown	In intertidal zones on rocky shores.
Gracilaria	Red	Cultivated for food.
Laminaria	Brown	Also known as kelp 8–30 m under water and cultivated for food.
Macrocystis	Brown	Giant kelp forming floating canopies.
Monostroma	Green	
Porphyra	Red	Intertidal zones in temperate climate and cultivated for food.
Sargassum	Brown	Pelagic especially in the Sargasso Sea.

== Anatomy ==
Seaweed's appearance resembles non-woody terrestrial plants. Its anatomy includes:

- Thallus: algal body
  - Lamina or blade: flattened structure that is somewhat leaf-like
    - Sorus: spore cluster
    - pneumatocyst, air bladder: a flotation-assisting organ on the blade
    - Kelp, float: a flotation-assisting organ between the lamina and stipe
  - Stipe: stem-like structure, may be absent
  - Holdfast: basal structure providing attachment to a substrate
    - Haptera: finger-like extension of the holdfast that anchors to a benthic substrate

The stipe and blade are collectively known as the frond.

== Ecology ==
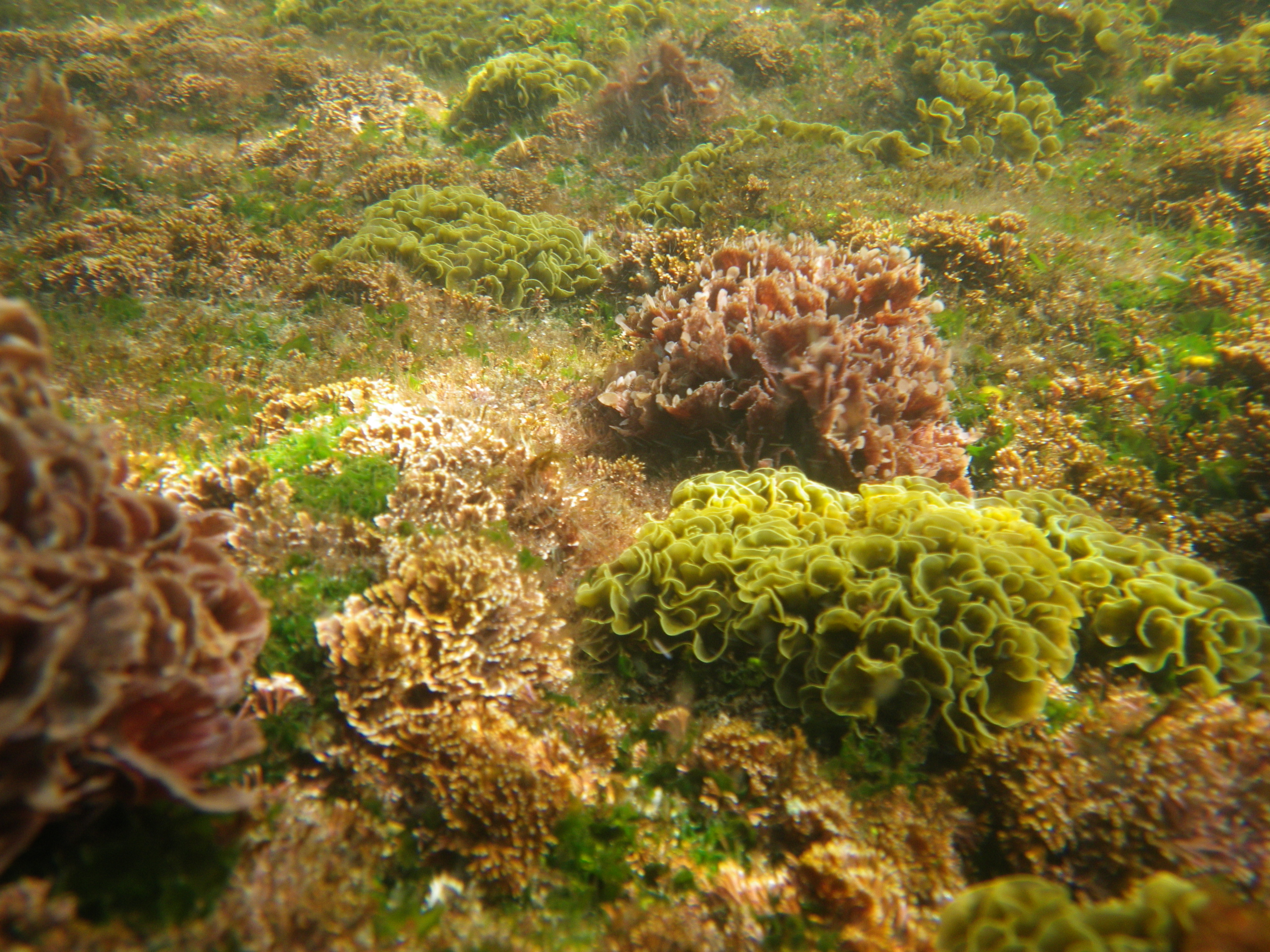
Seaweed covers this rocky seabed on the east coast of Australia.

Two environmental requirements dominate seaweed ecology. These are seawater (or at least brackish water) and light sufficient to support photosynthesis. Another common requirement is an attachment point, and therefore seaweed most commonly inhabits the littoral zone (nearshore waters) and within that zone, on rocky shores more than on sand or shingle. In addition, there are few genera (e.g., Sargassum and Gracilaria) which do not live attached to the sea floor, but float freely.

Seaweed occupies various ecological niches. At the surface, they are only wetted by the tops of sea spray, while some species may attach to a substrate several meters deep. In some areas, littoral seaweed colonies can extend miles out to sea. The deepest living seaweed are some species of red algae. Others have adapted to live in tidal rock pools. In this habitat, seaweed must withstand rapidly changing temperature and salinity and occasional drying.

Macroalgae and macroalgal detritus have also been shown to be an important food source for benthic organisms, because macroalgae shed old fronds. These macroalgal fronds tend to be utilized by benthos in the intertidal zone close to the shore. Alternatively, pneumatocysts (gas filled "bubbles") can keep the macroalgae thallus afloat; fronds are transported by wind and currents from the coast into the deep ocean. It has been shown that benthic organisms also at several 100 m tend to utilize these macroalgae remnants.

As macroalgae takes up carbon dioxide and releases oxygen in the photosynthesis, macroalgae fronds can also contribute to carbon sequestration in the ocean, when the macroalgal fronds drift offshore into the deep ocean basins and sink to the sea floor without being remineralized by organisms. The importance of this process for blue carbon storage is currently a topic of discussion among scientists.

=== Biogeographic expansion ===
Nowadays a number of vectors—e.g., transport on ship hulls, exchanges among shellfish farmers, global warming, opening of trans-oceanic canals—all combine to enhance the transfer of exotic seaweeds to new environments. Since the piercing of the Suez Canal, the situation is particularly acute in the Mediterranean Sea, a 'marine biodiversity hotspot' that now registers over 120 newly introduced seaweed species -the largest number in the world.

== Production ==
As of 2019, 35,818,961 tonnes were produced, of which 97.38% were produced in Asian countries.

Seaweed production
Country	tonnes per year, cultured and wild
China	20,351,442
Indonesia	9,962,900
South Korea	1,821,475
Philippines	1,500,326
North Korea	603,000
Chile	427,508
Japan	412,300
Malaysia	188,110
Norway	163,197
Tanzania	106,069

=== Farming ===
Seaweed farming or kelp farming is the practice of cultivating and harvesting seaweed. In its simplest form farmers gather from natural beds, while at the other extreme farmers fully control the crop's life cycle.

The seven most cultivated taxa are Eucheuma spp., Kappaphycus alvarezii, Gracilaria spp., Saccharina japonica, Undaria pinnatifida, Pyropia spp., and Sargassum fusiforme. Eucheuma and K. alvarezii are attractive for carrageenan (a gelling agent); Gracilaria is farmed for agar; the rest are eaten after limited processing. Seaweeds are different from mangroves and seagrasses, as they are photosynthetic algal organisms and are non-flowering.

The largest seaweed-producing countries as of 2022 are China (58.62%) and Indonesia (28.6%); followed by South Korea (5.09%) and the Philippines (4.19%). Other notable producers include North Korea (1.6%), Japan (1.15%), Malaysia (0.53%), Zanzibar (Tanzania, 0.5%), and Chile (0.3%). Seaweed farming has frequently been developed to improve economic conditions and to reduce fishing pressure.

The Food and Agriculture Organization (FAO) reported that world production in 2019 was over 35 million tonnes. North America produced some 23,000 tonnes of wet seaweed. Alaska, Maine, France, and Norway each more than doubled their seaweed production since 2018. As of 2019, seaweed represented 30% of marine aquaculture. In 2023, the global seaweed extract market was valued at $16.5 billion, with strong projected growth.

Seaweed farming is a carbon negative crop, with a high potential for climate change mitigation. The IPCC Special Report on the Ocean and Cryosphere in a Changing Climate recommends "further research attention" as a mitigation tactic. World Wildlife Fund, Oceans 2050, and The Nature Conservancy publicly support expanded seaweed cultivation.

== Uses ==
Seaweed has a variety of uses, for which it is farmed or foraged.

=== Food ===
Seaweed is consumed across the world, particularly in East Asia, e.g., Japan, China, Korea,and Southeast Asia, e.g. Brunei, Singapore, Thailand, Burma, Cambodia, Vietnam, Indonesia, the Philippines, and Malaysia, as well as in South Africa, Belize, Peru, Chile, the Canadian Maritimes, Scandinavia, South West England, Ireland, Wales, Polynesia (known as limu or rimu), California, and Scotland.

Gim (김, Korea), nori (海苔, Japan) and zicai (紫菜, China) are sheets of dried Porphyra used in soups, sushi or onigiri (rice balls). Gamet in the Philippines, from dried Pyropia, is also used as a flavoring ingredient for soups, salads and omelettes. Chondrus crispus ('Irish moss' or carrageenan moss) is used in food additives, along with Kappaphycus and Gigartinoid seaweed. Porphyra is used in Wales to make laverbread (sometimes with oat flour). In northern Belize, seaweed is mixed with milk, nutmeg, cinnamon and vanilla to make "dulce" ("sweet").

Alginate, agar and carrageenan are gelatinous seaweed products collectively known as hydrocolloids or phycocolloids. Hydrocolloids are food additives. The food industry exploits their gelling, water-retention, emulsifying and other physical properties. Agar is used in foods such as confectionery, meat and poultry products, desserts and beverages and moulded foods. Carrageenan is used in salad dressings and sauces, dietetic foods, and as a preservative in meat and fish, dairy items and baked goods.

Seaweeds are used as animal feeds. They have long been grazed by sheep, horses and cattle in Northern Europe, even though their nutritional benefits are questionable. Their protein content is low and their heavy metal content is high, especially for arsenic and iodine, which are respectively toxic and nutritious.

They are valued for fish production. Adding seaweed to livestock feed can substantially reduce methane emissions from cattle, but only from their feedlot emissions. As of 2021, feedlot emissions account for 11% of overall emissions from cattle.

=== Medicine and herbs ===
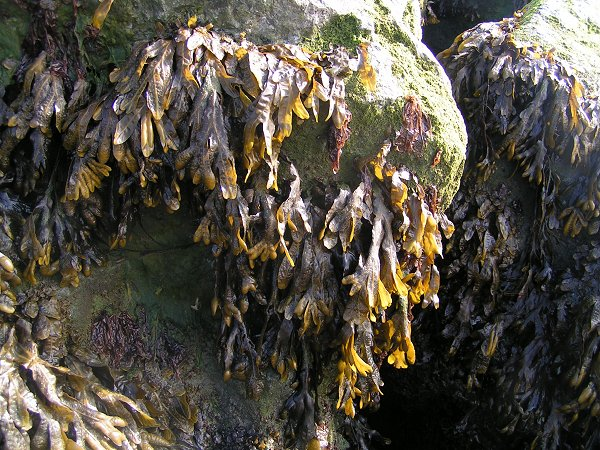
Seaweed-covered rocks in the United Kingdom

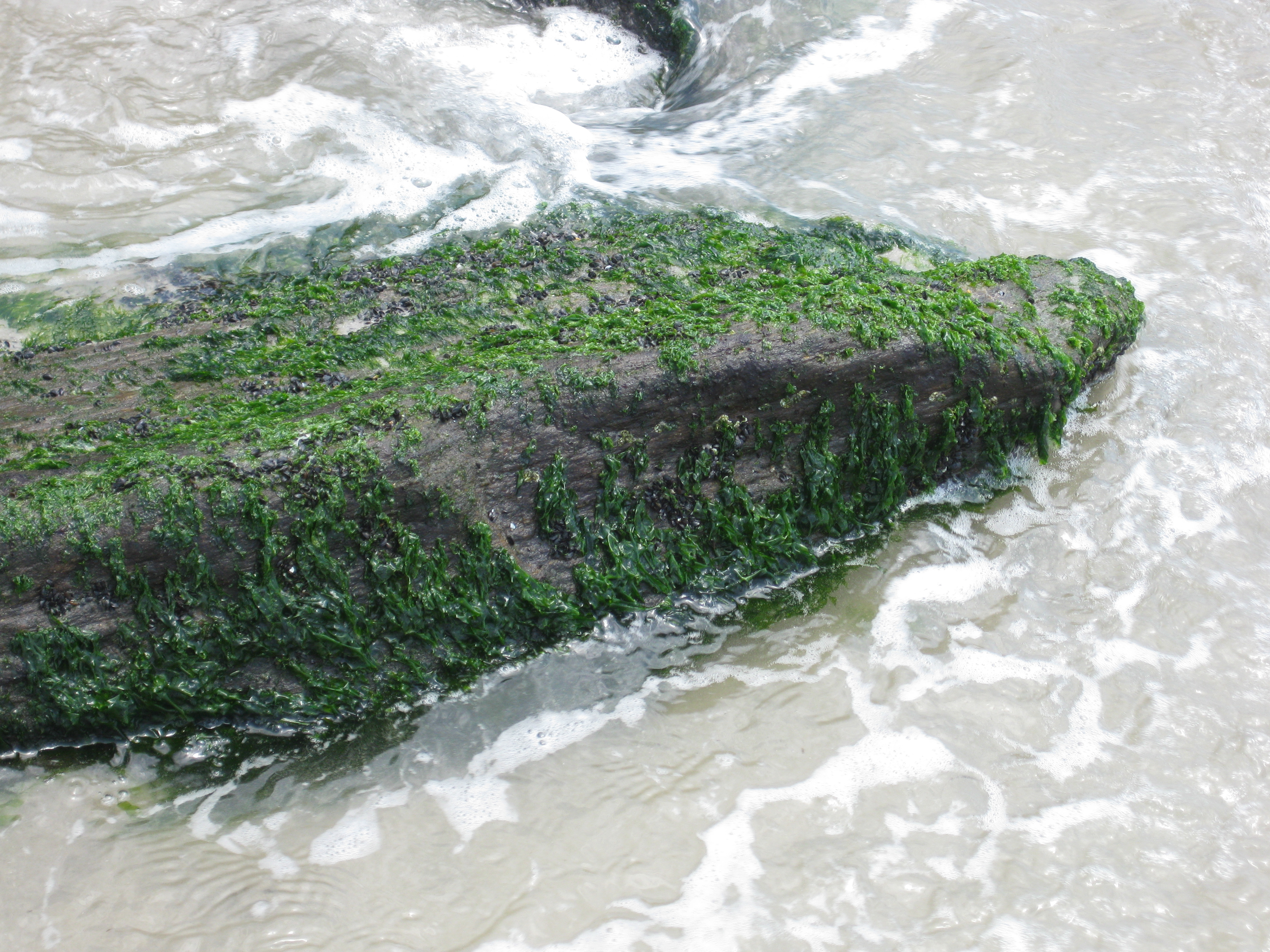
Seaweed on rocks on Long Island

Alginates are used in wound dressings (see alginate dressing), and dental moulds. In microbiology, agar is used as a culture medium. Carrageenans, alginates and agaroses, with other macroalgal polysaccharides, have biomedicine applications. Delisea pulchra may interfere with bacterial colonization. Sulfated saccharides from red and green algae inhibit some DNA and RNA-enveloped viruses.

Seaweed extract is used in some diet pills. Other seaweed pills exploit the same effect as gastric banding, expanding in the stomach to make the stomach feel more full.

=== Paper and packaging ===
Seaweed can be used for packaging, such as via being made into a rigid plastic alternative, while seaweed pulp can be used to make paper.

=== Climate change mitigation ===
Seaweeds (particularly kelps) can sequester large amounts of carbon via the burial of seaweed detritus in sediments, export of seaweed detritus to the deep ocean, or the persistence of seaweed-derived dissolved organic carbon (DOC) in the ocean for timescales relevant to climate change mitigation. Since seaweeds cover approximately one third of coastlines globally and are some of the most productive ecosystems on the planet, they produce vast quantities of carbon. However, whether seaweeds can be considered as blue carbon ecosystems is not widely agreed upon by experts due to uncertainties regarding the fate of macroalgal-produced carbon. More research is necessary to understand the extent of marine carbon sequestration that can be attributed to macroalgae, which will enable us to understand if seaweeds can meaningfully contribute to climate change mitigation.

Furthermore, one proposed strategy to sequester carbon using seaweed involves cultivating/farming seaweed in the open ocean, then intentionally sinking that seaweed biomass to the deep ocean, thereby sequestering the carbon contained within that seaweed in the deep ocean. Scientists and experts have pushed back on this plan, as it would likely not be feasible due to the lack of iron in the open ocean, preventing seaweed growth, as well as the potential myriad of ecological consequences sinking vast amounts of seaweed could cause (including acting as a vector for invasive species, interferring with megafaunal migrations, and disrupting deep sea ecosystems).

=== Other uses ===
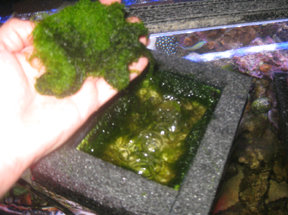
Seaweed is lifted out of the top of an algae scrubber/cultivator, to be discarded or used as food, fertilizer, or skin care.

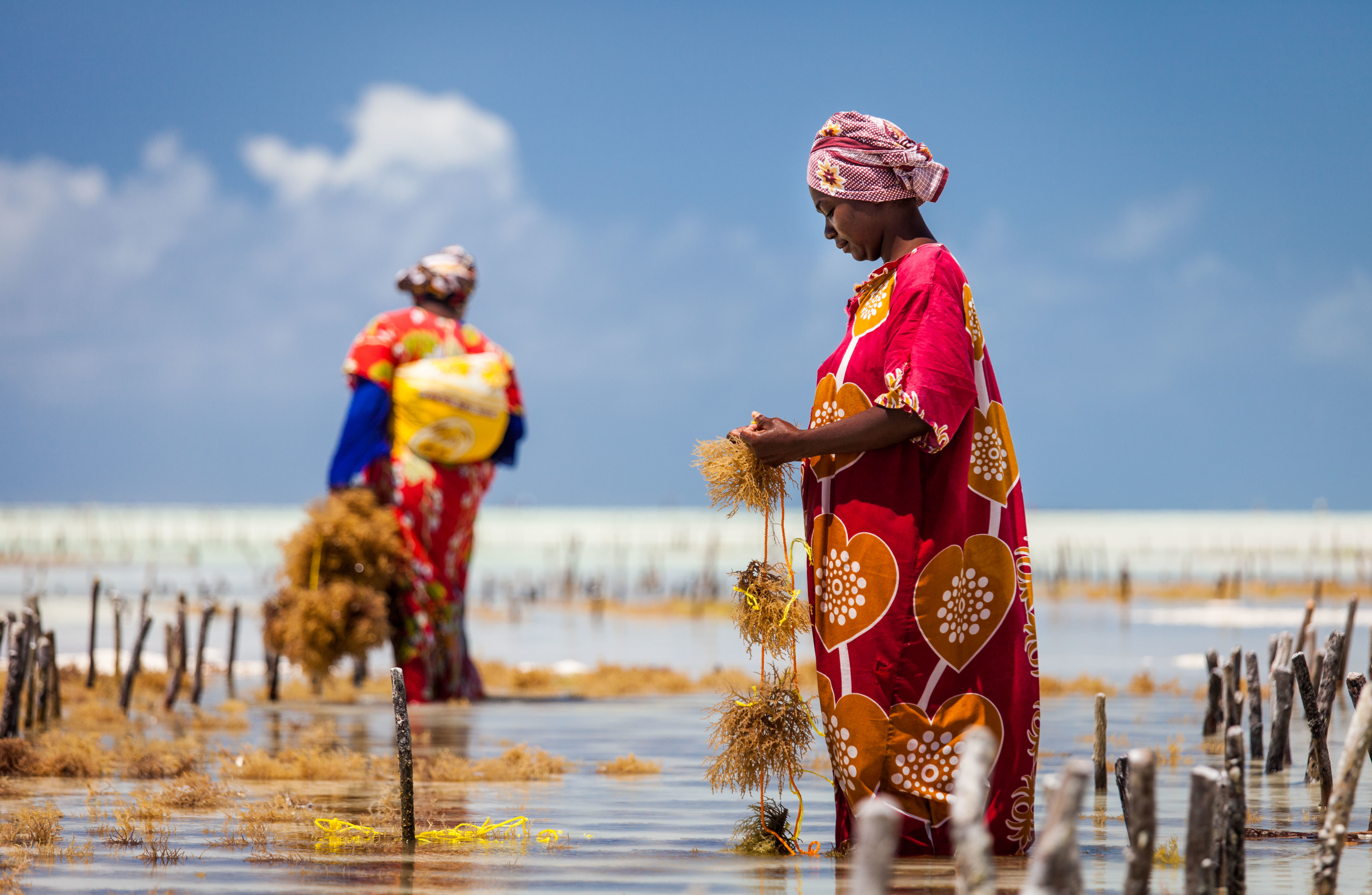
Women in Tanzania grow "Mwani" (seaweed in Swahili). The farms are made up of little sticks in neat rows in the warm, shallow water. Once they harvest the seaweed, it is used for many purposes: food, cosmetics, fabric, etc.

Other seaweed may be used as fertilizer, compost for landscaping, or to combat beach erosion through burial in beach dunes.

Seaweed is under consideration as a potential source of bioethanol.

Alginates are used in industrial products such as paper coatings, adhesives, dyes, gels, explosives and in processes such as paper sizing, textile printing, hydro-mulching and drilling. Seaweed is an ingredient in toothpaste, cosmetics and paints. Seaweed is used for the production of bio yarn (a textile).

Several of these resources can be obtained from seaweed through biorefining.

Seaweed collecting is the process of collecting, drying and pressing seaweed. It was a popular pastime in the Victorian era and remains a hobby today. In some emerging countries, seaweed is harvested daily to support communities.

Seaweed has traditionally been used to build roofs on houses on Læsø in Denmark.

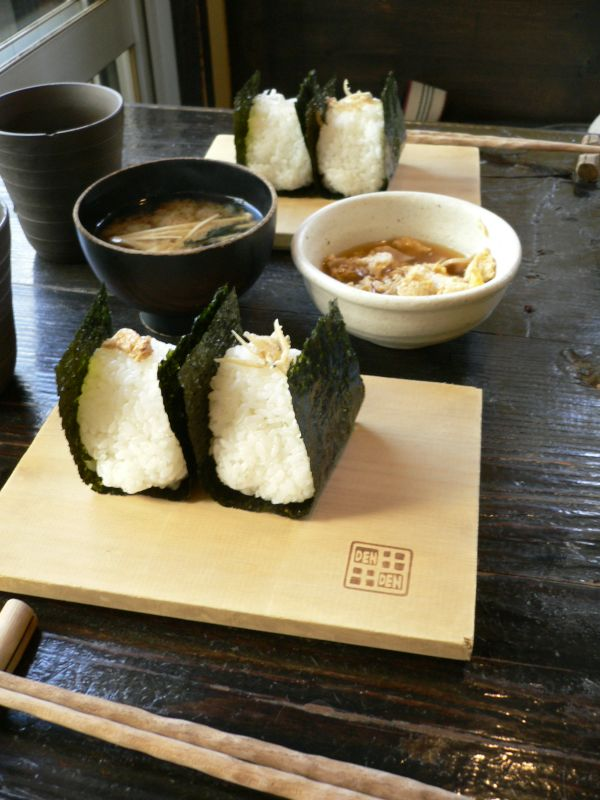
Onigiri and wakame miso soup, Japan

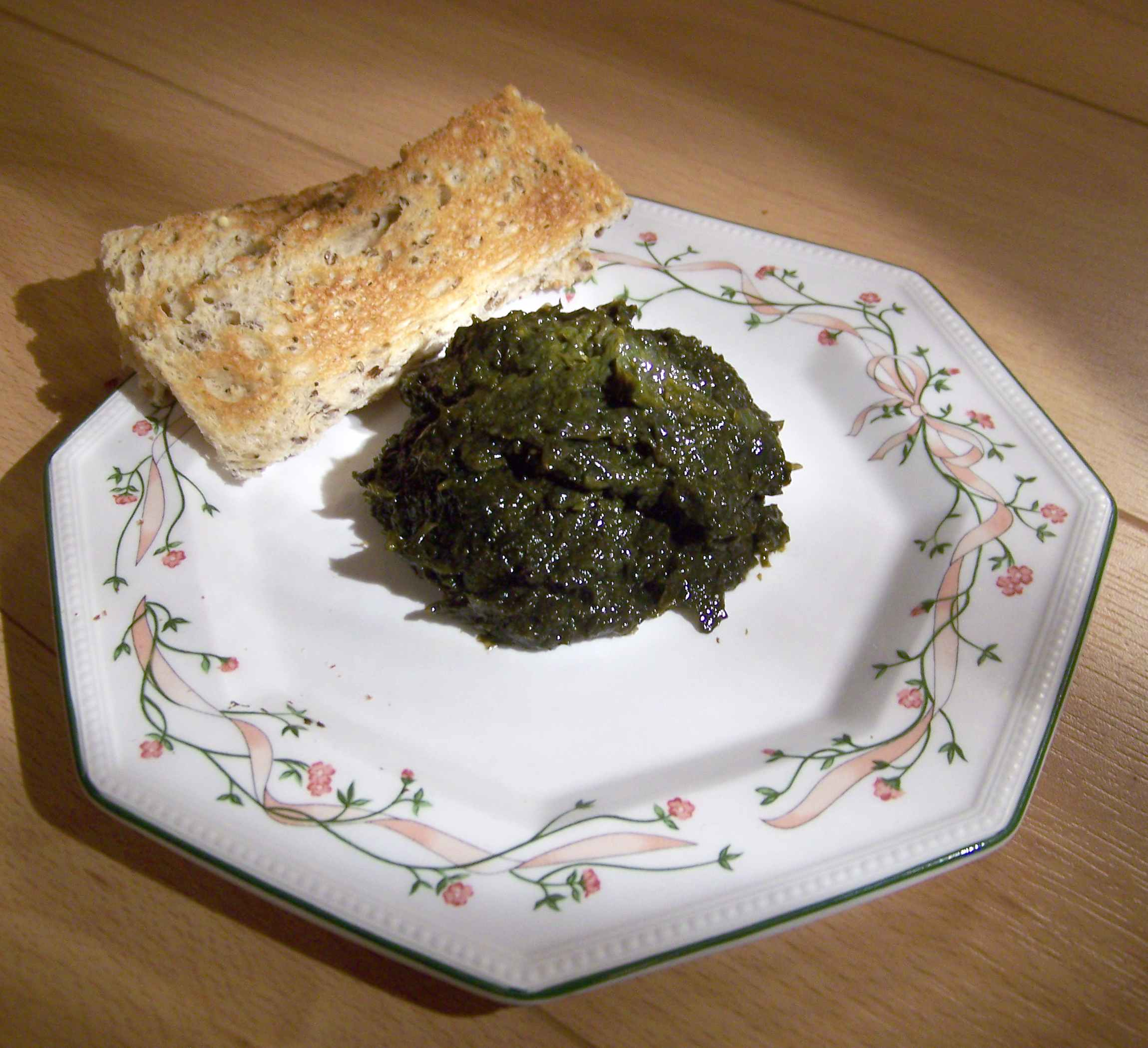
Laverbread and toast

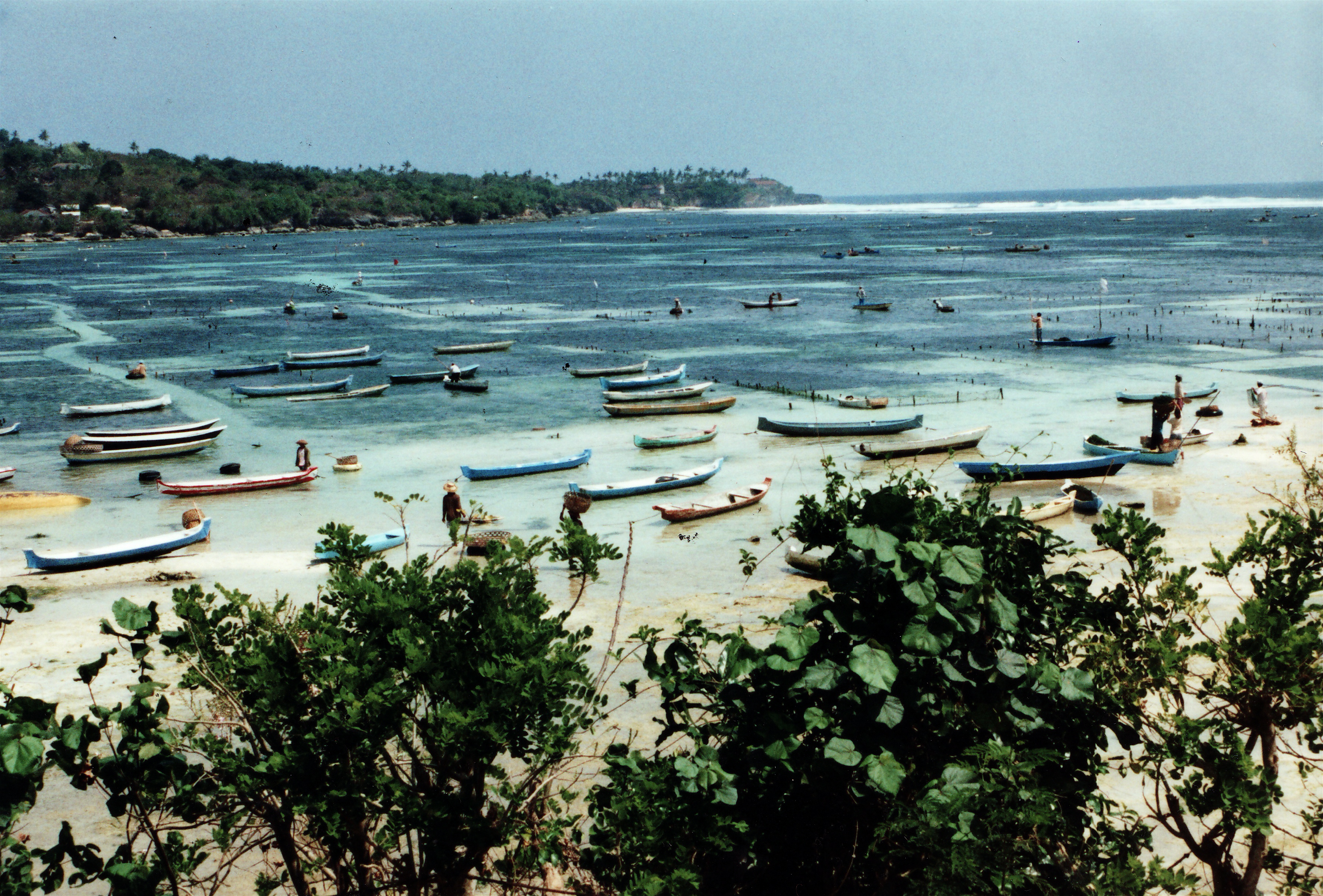
Small plots being used to farm seaweed in Indonesia, with each rectangle belonging to a different family

== Health risks ==
Rotting seaweed is a potent source of hydrogen sulfide, a highly toxic gas, and has been implicated in some incidents of apparent hydrogen sulfide poisoning. It can cause vomiting and diarrhea.

The so-called "stinging seaweed" Microcoleus lyngbyaceus is a filamentous cyanobacteria which contains toxins including lyngbyatoxin-a and debromoaplysiatoxin. Direct skin contact can cause seaweed dermatitis characterized by painful, burning lesions that last for days.

== Threats ==
Bacterial disease ice-ice infects Kappaphycus (red seaweed), turning its branches white. The disease caused heavy crop losses in the Philippines, Tanzania and Mozambique.

Sea urchin barrens have replaced kelp forests in multiple areas. They are "almost immune to starvation". Lifespans can exceed 50 years. When stressed by hunger, their jaws and teeth enlarge, and they form "fronts" and hunt for food collectively.

== See also ==
- Algaculture – Aquaculture involving the farming of algae
- Seaweed fertilizer
- Algae fuel – Use of algae as a source of energy-rich oils
- Edible seaweed – Algae that can be used for culinary purposes
  - Aonori – Type of edible green seaweed
  - Cochayuyo – Species of seaweed, a form of kelp used as a vegetable in Chile
  - Hijiki – Species of seaweed
  - Kombu – Edible kelp
  - Limu
  - Mozuku – Species of seaweed
  - Nori – Edible seaweed species of the red algae genus Pyropia
  - Ogonori – Genus of seaweeds
  - Wakame – Species of seaweed
- Marine permaculture
- Sea lettuce – Genus of seaweeds
- Seaweed cultivator
- Seaweed dermatitis – Species of bacterium
- Seaweed toxins
- Seaweed roofs on Læsø
