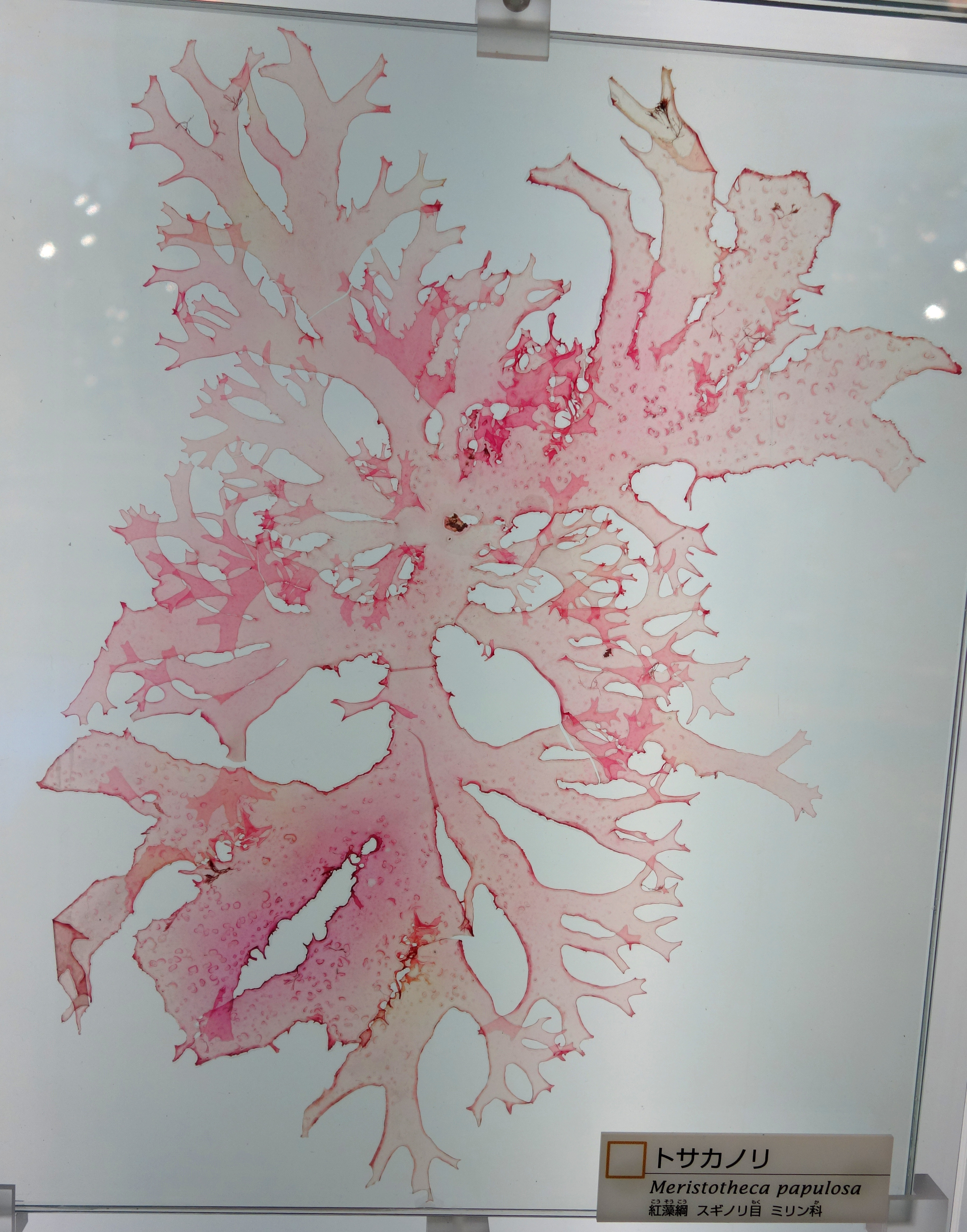

Scientific classification
- Clade: Archaeplastida
- Division: Rhodophyta
- Class: Florideophyceae
- Order: Gigartinales
- Family: Solieriaceae
- Genus: Meristotheca
- Species: M. papulosa

Binomial name
- Meristotheca papulosa (Montagne) J. Agardh

= Meristotheca papulosa =

Species of seaweed

Meristotheca papulosa (synonyms: M. japonica and Eucheuma papulosa) is a red alga, popular as a sea vegetable in Taiwan, where it is known as jiguancai (Chinese: 鸡冠菜; pinyin: jīguāncài, literally "cockscomb vegetable"), and in Japan, where it is known as tosaka-nori (Japanese: トサカノリ), which can be prefixed with aka (red) so as to distinguish it from the ao (green) and shiro (white) varieties.

== Description ==
The plant tissue varies in color from red to peach, the texture is fleshy and cartilaginous, and the shape is flat and leaf-like, with irregular deep forking divisions. The edges often grow many branchlets of uneven lengths. The surfaces of older individuals will grow warty or spiky protuberances. The morphology is variable. Length can reach 10–40 cm, with a branch width of 1–5 cm. The interior of the algal body has multiple axes.

== Life cycle ==
It has isomorphic alternation of generations (the sporophyte and the gametophyte share a very similar appearance). The tetrasporangia are divided in a ladder shape and scattered across the cortex.

== Ecology and distribution ==
It grows on subtidal rocks 5–20 metres deep, and can be seen at all times of the year.

It is very widely distributed along the coasts of the Indian Ocean from South Africa to Australia, and the western Pacific Ocean from Australia to Japan.
