= Ice-ice =

Disease condition of seaweed

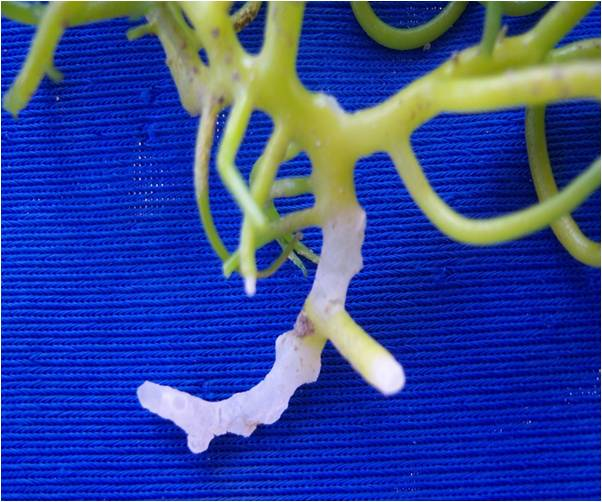
Kappaphycus sp. with ice-ice

Ice-ice is a disease condition of seaweed. Ice-ice is caused when changes in salinity, ocean temperature and light intensity cause stress to seaweeds, making them produce a "moist organic substance" that attracts bacteria in the water and induces the characteristic "whitening" and hardening of the seaweed's tissues. Bacteria involved include those in the Vibrio-Aeromonas and Cytophaga-Flavobacteria complexes. The bacteria lyse epidermal cells and chloroplasts, turning the seaweed tissue white. The disease is known from seaweeds including Kappaphycus alvarezii and Eucheuma denticulatum, economically important sources of carrageenan. In countries where seaweed is harvested as a crop, ice-ice can wreak havoc on yields. Zamboanga, Philippines, had an outbreak of ice-ice in 2004, and Bali, Indonesia, experienced an outbreak in 2009. A rise in surface sea temperatures of 2–3 degrees Celsius can trigger ice-ice outbreaks.

== Pathogens ==
Analysis has been performed to determine the pathogens affecting the Gracilaria verrucosa and Kappaphycus alvarezii seaweeds. Morphologic and phenotypic characteristics (16s RNA analysis) showed that the isolates from diseased Gracilaria belong to various genera: Vibrio, Chromobacterium, Flavobacterium, Pseudomonas, and Achromobacter. They belong for the most part to the group of Gammaproteobacteria, already well known from disease-related study on seaweeds. For the seaweeds K. alvarezii a leading candidate bacterium has been identified: Stenotrophomonas maltophilia. In most cases it seems these microorganisms are opportunistic pathogens. Some treatments have been investigated to cure these ice-ice infections, the green algae Caulerpa racemosa seems to inhibit the action of the most part of these pathogens.

== Effects ==
The disease seems to affect the formation of micropropagule of the algae. The protoplasm content is higher in a healthy micropropagule than in the infected ones. Protoplasm indicates occurrence of severe chronic infections of the micropropagules (algae disease are characterized by reduced number of cell protoplasm).
