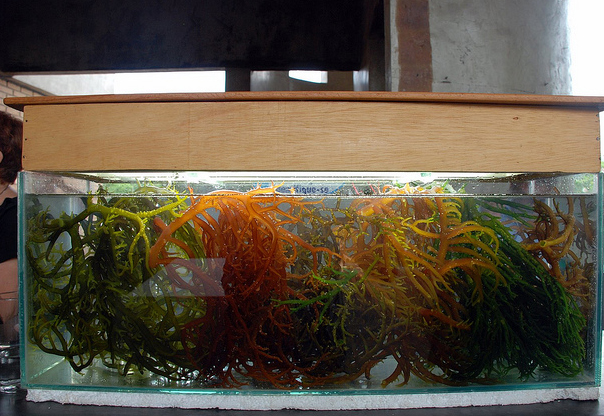

Scientific classification
- Domain: Eukaryota
- Clade: Archaeplastida
- Division: Rhodophyta
- Class: Florideophyceae
- Order: Gigartinales
- Family: Solieriaceae
- Genus: Kappaphycus
- Species: K. alvarezii

Binomial name
- Kappaphycus alvarezii (Doty) Doty ex Silva

= Kappaphycus alvarezii =

Species of red algae

Kappaphycus alvarezii, the elkhorn sea moss, is a species of red algae. The elkhorn sea moss varies in size, weight, and age. It is a dark greenish-brown hue and can sometimes be deep purple. The moss is cylindrical in shape throughout the seaweed. Its diameter averages 1.526 mm when dried. Near the base of the seaweed, its average length is from 1 mm to 17 mm and 1 mm to 2 mm in diameter. Firm algae are around 2 m tall, with axes and branches around 1–2 cm in diameter. They reproduce both sexually and asexually through vegetative propagation. Cross sections of the Elkhorn sea moss has a medulla composed of small thick-walled cells interspaced among large parenchyma cells. This moss is used for various types of foods that humans consume and can also be used to make a jelly-like dessert. Elkhorn sea moss is a good source of minerals and of high commercial interest. It is one of the most important commercial sources of carrageenans, a family of gel-forming, viscosifying polysaccharides. Farming methods affect the character of the carrageenan that can be extracted from the seaweed. It is very fast-growing, known to double its biomass in 15 days.

== Habitat and ecology ==
The Elkhorn sea moss is located in the Pacific, French, and Indian Oceans, as well as the Caribbean sea, South China sea. It is located on the islands of Hawaii and Guam. Lastly, it is located in Fanning, Moana, Tonga, and Fiji.

=== Role within native habitat ===
The role this sea moss plays in its native habitat is to feed the fish in the surrounding area. It also produces and releases certain minerals which benefit the habitat in which it inhabits. It is found on reef flats and the edges of the reef varying in depth. The moss can be anywhere from 1–17 meters deep. It can also loosely attach itself to the coral. They can form large unattached fragments that can form a mat like structure. This algal mat can act as UV protection for fish and act as a source of food for the surrounding aquatic life. This sea moss has the ability to attach itself to the coral reefs which is when their abilities of invasion are noticed. Once they attach to the surface of the coral they have the ability to endure high wave energy environments. When they are anchored to the tissue of the coral they are able to rapidly divide and spread due to their high growth rates and high successful vegetative regeneration. Once this species invades the coral reefs or the surrounding area it allows for the settlement of epiphytes and shelter for the mesograzers. Physical disturbances can also relocate this species and possibly allow it the opportunity to establish itself in its new environment.

== History as an invasive species ==
This alga is an introduced species and a noxious aquatic weed in Hawaii. This species was considered and introduced in many countries with the sole main purpose of increasing the commercial aquaculture carrageenan industry; the carrageenan is a biopolymer extracted from algae and used extensively in the food industry for the formation of gels to stabilize fat in food with dairy products.

Regardless of the widespread introduction of the species, there have been few studies explaining that this species has formed natural populations surrounding farm plots.

Kappaphycus alverezil has been introduced to a lot of different countries around the world for aquaculture purposes. Some of the countries that this species has been introduced to include China, Fiji, India, Indonesia, Japan, Malaysia, the Philippines, Vietnam, Tanzania, and the United States. Cultivation of the species occurs in the open water when cutting the specific algae off of rope lines replacing in shallow reefs in the flatter, shallower environments. They have not established natural populations in the areas surrounding farmland. They reproduce through vegetative propagation, resulting in the spread and dispersal of the species. They can also reproduce sexually. Due to their large size they are able to out-compete the native species of the reef. It's reproductive structures are tetrasporic and gametaphytic. The species responds to water temperatures between 22 and 25 degrees Celsius and there's no acclimation of species to 18 degrees Celsius. Maximum photosynthetic rates occur specifically at 30 degrees Celsius and is inhibited at 35 to 40 degrees Celsius. There is not much research conducted on this specific species and its response to salinity. The species has been an invasive species for the last 40 years and has not been explored very well. It has the potential for ecological and environmental impacts it needs further exploration.

Primarily the habitat they usually invaded is in reef flat and edges around 1 to 17 meters deep. They attach loosely to the broken coral or floating fragments in the shallow deep waters. It can form large, moving mats of unattached seaweed. It is known to be invasive to Hawaii, Malaysia, Sulu Sea, and the southern Philippines. It was introduced to Kane‘ohe Bay in 1974 for commercial cultivation only. During their invasion to Kane‘ohe Bay, they spread at a rate of 260 m/yr. The high growth rate, plastic morphology, and extremely successful vegetative regeneration makes it this species potentially destructive invasives in Hawaiian waters.

This species has been highly successful at Kane‘ohe Bay, dominating the sandy spur and grooves on the reef flat. It inhabits barren, sandy grooves where it does not appear to compete with native algal species. K. alvarezii has been introduced throughout the warm tropics for commercial cultivation. It is a major producer of kappa-carrageenan, which is used for medicinal purposes and as a homogenizer in milk products, toothpaste, and jellies.

Since the big spread of this species in the 1970s, it has spread to the point of naturally becoming part of the reefs in Kane’ohe bay in Oahu Hawaii. Though there is evidence of the widespread of this species, there aren't enough studies that prove or show the ecological impacts they have on the reefs communities. These species have been growing on and over reefs for many years causing them to outcompete native species and restrict the growth of native species.

== Control ==
Due to the damage done by Kappaphycus alvarezii, actions have taken place to remove Kappaphycus alvarezii in Hawaii.

Sea urchins have been used to determine what may help in the removal of invasive seaweed. The native collector urchins were placed onto a patch of reef and have grazed the algae. These sea urchins have preferred this species over any other type of algae. The algae have been kept to a minimum due to the introduction of sea urchins in the area.

The Elkhorn sea moss has also been killed by copper sulfate, temperature gradients, rock salt, and chlorine bleach. These methods used show a high mortality rate of the elkhorn sea moss in the areas. This method has also been used in other reefs as they will be used in the reefs of Hawaii.

== Uses ==
Kappaphycus is a major source of carrageenan. Carrageenan is an additive used for thickening and preserving foods and drinks. Carrageenan is used for their rheological properties such as emulsifiers, binders. It is also used for suspension or stabilization in a wide range of pharmaceutical carriers, processed food products, and cosmetics. It is used in things like toothpaste, dairy products, and jellies.

Carrageenan is found within the cell wall of Kappaphycus, which contributes to the antioxidant potential and the presence of ascorbic acid, various phenolics, and vitamin A. Antioxidants defend against oxidative damage from reactive oxygen species. These species can damage cells by chain reactions. All cells contain antioxidants to reduce or prevent said damage.

Different carrageenan types differ in composition and conformation, resulting in a wide range of rheological and functional properties. Carrageenans are used in a variety of commercial applications as gelling, thickening, and stabilizing agents, especially in food products such as frozen desserts, chocolate milk, cottage cheese, whipped cream, instant products, yogurt, jellies, pet foods, and sauces. Aside from these functions, carrageenans are used in pharmaceutical formulations, cosmetics, and industrial applications such as mining. Carrageenan is extracted from this seaweed in two ways. In native extraction, the seaweed is made into an aqueous solution, and the residue is filtered, leaving nearly pure carrageenan. The alkaline-modified method is less expensive and easier. The seaweed is mixed in an alkali solution, leaving a mixture of carrageenan and cellulose that can be sold as semirefined carrageenan. K. alvarezii is affected by ice-ice, a disease that severely reduces its yield.
