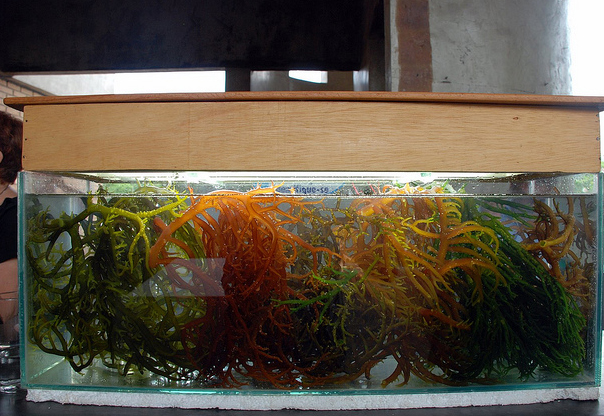
- Kappaphycus alvarezii

Scientific classification
- Domain: Eukaryota
- Clade: Archaeplastida
- Division: Rhodophyta
- Class: Florideophyceae
- Order: Gigartinales
- Family: Solieriaceae
- Genus: Kappaphycus; Doty

Species
- about 6, see text

= Kappaphycus =

Genus of algae

Kappaphycus is a genus of red algae. Species are distributed in the waters of East Africa, Indonesia, Malaysia, China (Hainan Island), the Philippines, and Micronesia.

== Description ==
The genus Kappaphycus is "morphologically plastic", with few visible characters that can be used to separate the taxa, so distinguishing the species can be difficult. In addition, many commercial varieties have been bred. Molecular analyses can be used.

In general, these algae have fleshy thalli that grow erect from one or more anchors. The longest individuals can exceed a meter in length.

== Uses ==
All species produce kappa-carrageenan. Farming of this is a large business in the Philippines. Gavino Trono is a Filipino biologist dubbed the “Father of Kappaphycus farming”.

Kappaphycus alvarezii is widely cultivated as a raw source of carrageenan, and other species are used, as well. Several Kappaphycus are invasive species.

== Species ==
The following species are recognised in the genus cc:

- Kappaphycus alvarezii (Doty) Doty ex P.C.Silva, 1996
- Kappaphycus cottonii (Weber Bosse) Doty ex P.C.Silva, 1996
- Kappaphycus inermis (F.Schmitz) Doty ex H.D.Nguyen & Q.N.Huynh, 1995
- Kappaphycus malesianus J.Tan, P.E.Lim & S.M.Phang, 2013
- Kappaphycus procrusteanus (Kraft) Doty, 1988
- Kappaphycus striatus (F.Schmitz) Doty ex P.C.Silva, 1996
