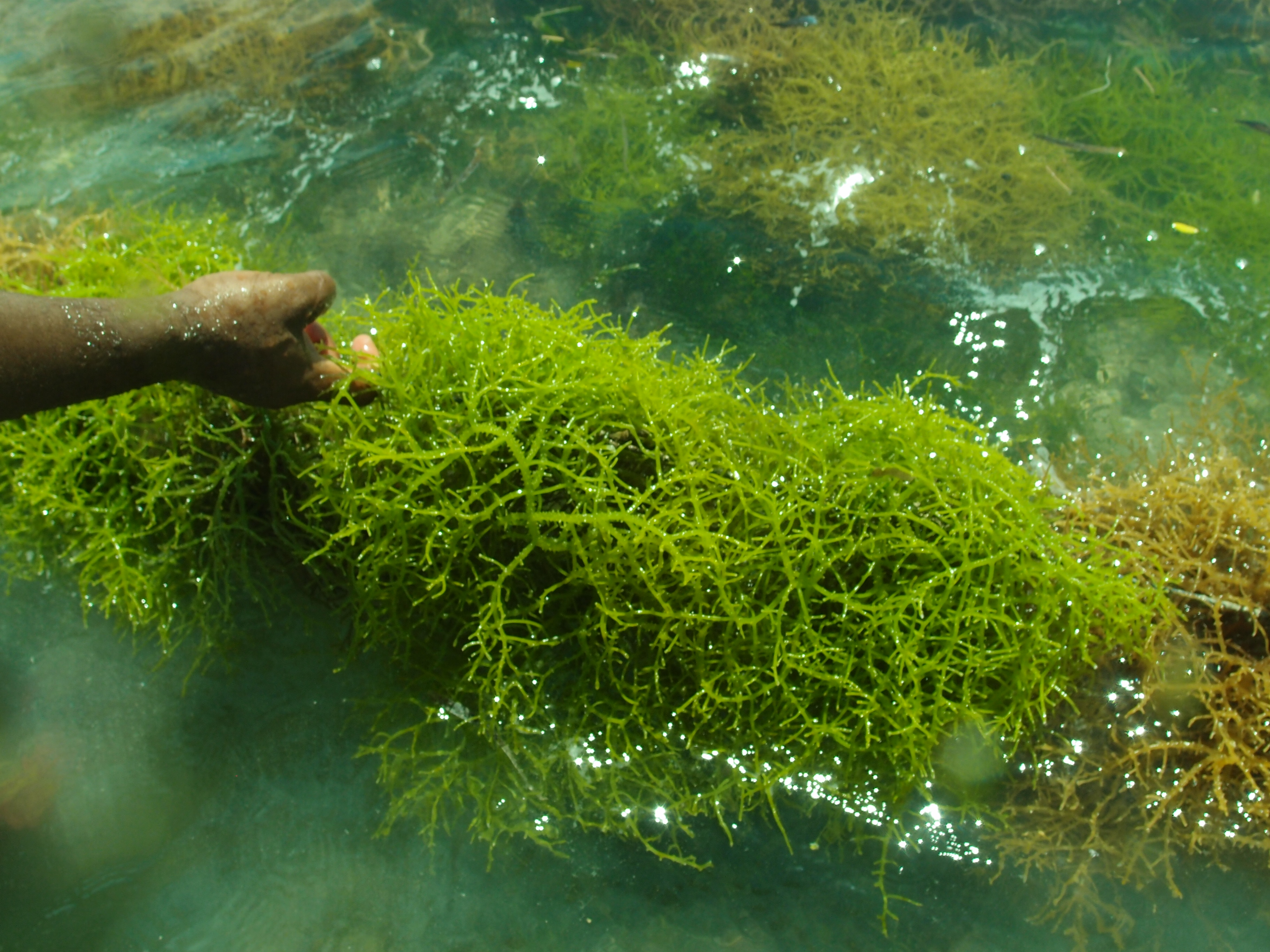
- Eucheuma denticulatum

Scientific classification
- Clade: Archaeplastida
- Division: Rhodophyta
- Class: Florideophyceae
- Order: Gigartinales
- Family: Solieriaceae; J.Agardh

= Solieriaceae =

Family of algae

Solieriaceae is a family of red algae in the order Gigartinales.

Type species - Solieria J.Agardh

== Genera ==
As accepted by AlgaeBase;

- Agardhiella F.Schmitz - 5 spp.
- Betaphycus Doty - 2 spp.
- Eucheuma J.Agardh - 26 spp.
- Eucheumatopsis Núñez-Resendiz, Dreckmann & Sentíes - 2 spp.
- Euryomma F.Schmitz - 1 sp.
- Flahaultia Bornet - 3 spp.
- Gardneriella Kylin - 1 sp.
- Kappaphycopsis Dumilag & Zuccarello - 1 sp.
- Kappaphycus Doty - 5 spp.
- Melanema Min-Thein & Womersley - 1 sp.
- Meristotheca J.Agardh - 16 spp.
- Mimica Santiañez & M.J.Wynne - 2 spp.
- Sarcodiotheca Kylin - 12 spp.
- Sarconema Zanardini - 3 spp.
- Solieria J.Agardh - 10 spp.
- Tacanoosca J.N.Norris, P.W.Gabrielson & D.P.Cheney - 1 sp.
- Tepoztequiella Núñez-Resendiz, Dreckmann & Sentíes - 2 spp.
- Tikvahiella Kraft & Gabrielson - 1 sp.
- Wurdemannia - 1 sp.
