= Edible seaweed =

Algae that can be used for culinary purposes

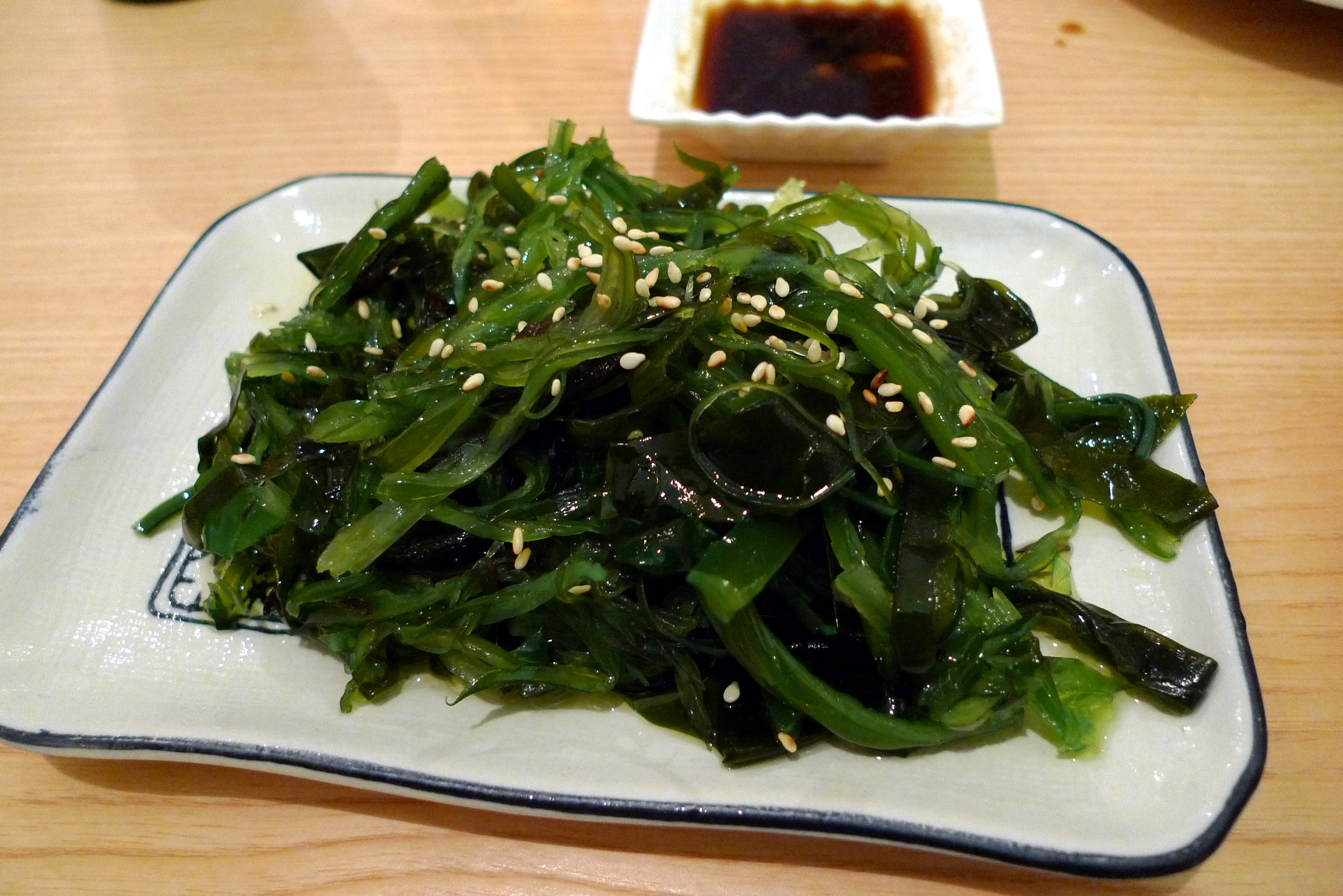
A dish of pickled spicy seaweed

Edible seaweeds are seaweeds that can be eaten and used for culinary purposes. They typically contain high amounts of fiber. They may belong to one of several groups of multicellular algae: the red algae, green algae, and brown algae. Seaweeds are also harvested or cultivated for the extraction of polysaccharides such as alginate, agar and carrageenan, gelatinous substances collectively known as hydrocolloids or phycocolloids. Hydrocolloids have attained commercial significance, especially in food production as food additives. The food industry exploits the gelling, water-retention, emulsifying and other physical properties of these hydrocolloids.

Seaweed as food is particularly popular in East Asia, Southeast Asia, and the Pacific Islands.

Most edible seaweeds are marine algae, a group containing few toxic (though some deadly) species, while freshwater algae are mostly toxic.

== Common species ==
Common edible seaweeds include:

=== Red algae ===
Red algae are also called Rhodophyta.

- Agal-agal (Gracilaria edulis)
- Agar-agar (Kanten/Japanese isinglass/China grass/Ceylon moss)
  - Eucheuma spp.
  - Gigartina spp.
  - Gracilaria spp.
- Agar-agar besar (Eucheuma edule)
- Arien (Hypnea divaricata)
- Barangay/Burubalete/Rakom-rakom (Ohelopapa flexilis)
- Baris-baris (Ganonema farinosum)
- Bibiru (Sarcodia montagneana)
- Binagong (Kappaphycopsis cottonii)
- Bulung buku (Gracilaria salicornia)
- Bulung djukut lelipan (Eucheuma serra)
- Carola (Callophyllis spp.)
- Carrageen moss (Mastocarpus stellatus)
- Culot
  - Acanthophora spicifera
  - Hypnea cervicornis
- Dulse (Palmaria palmata)
- Elkhorn sea moss (Kappaphycus alvarezii)
- Gamet
  - Halymenia formosa
  - Porphyra atropurpurea
  - Pyropia vietnamensis
- Gelidiella (Gelidiella acerosa)
- Gim
  - Pyropia spp.
  - Porphyra spp.
- Grapestone (Mastocarpus papillatus)
- Gulaman
  - Agardhiella spp.
  - Betaphycus gelatinus
  - Eucheuma spp.
  - Gracilaria spp.
  - Gracilariopsis longissima
- Gulaman indudulsi (Gelidiella acerosa)
- Gulaman insusuli
  - Durudancalan (Gracilaria arcuata)
  - Pancit-pancitan (Gracilaria gigas)
- Gusô
  - Eucheuma cottonii
  - Eucheuma denticulatum
- Hypnea spp.
- Irish moss (Chondrus crispus)
- Kinalingking (Betaphycus gelatinus)
- Laverbread (Porphyra laciniata/Porphyra umbilicalis)
- Limu lepeahina (Halymenia formosa)
- Limu koele (Gracilaria debilis)
- Limu loloa (Gelidium pulchellum)
- Limu luau (Porphyra atropurpurea)
- Ogonori
  - Gracilaria edulis
  - Gracilaria corticata
- Nori (Porphyra spp.)
- Sea moss (Eucheuma spp.)
- Sangau/Intip-intip (Gelidiella acerosa)
- Sea sacs (Halosaccion glandiforme)
- Tartariptip/Limu maneoneo (Palisada perforata)
- Tikog-tikog (Acanthophora spicifera)
- Umutgasari (Gelidium amansii)

=== Green algae ===
- Abalang (Codium edule)
- Chlorella (Chlorella sp.)
- Galgalakgak (Caulerpa serrulata)
- Green laver (Aonori/Hutai/Parae)
  - Monostroma spp.
  - Ulva intestinalis
  - Ulva prolifera
  - Ulva pertusa
- Gutweed (Ulva intestinalis)
- Kawat-kawat (Chaetomorpha crassa)
- Limu aalaula/Pokpoklo/Siling-siling (Codium muelleri)
- Limu huluilio (Chaetomorpha antennina)
- Limu wāwaeʻiole (Codium edule)
- Lumut laut (Chaetomorpha javanica)
- Parasol seaweed (Caulerpa chemnitzia)
- Pupu-lo (Codium tenue)
- Salsalamagui (Caulerpa sertularioides)
- Sea grapes or green caviar (Caulerpa lentillifera/Caulerpa racemosa)
- Sea lettuce (Lumot/Rupurupu/Limu ele-ele/Limu pipilani)
  - Ulva spp.
  - Ulva compressa
  - Ulva intestinalis
  - Ulva lactuca

=== Brown algae ===
Brown algae are also called Phaeophyceae.

==== Kelp ====
Kelp are also called Laminariales.

- Agar-agar daun besar (Padina australis)
- Arame (Eisenia bicyclis)
- Badderlocks (Alaria esculenta)
- Cochayuyo (Durvillaea antarctica)
- Ecklonia cava
- Kombu (Saccharina japonica)
- Oarweed (Laminaria digitata)
- Sea palm Postelsia palmaeformis
- Bull kelp (Nereocystis luetkeana)
- Sugar kelp (Saccharina latissima)
- Wakame (Undaria pinnatifida)
- Hiromi (Undaria undarioides)

==== Fucales ====
- Agar-agar lesong/Arien essong (Turbinaria ornata)
- Aragan (Sargassum siliquosum)
- Arien wari
  - Sargassum aquifolium
  - Sargassum granuliferum
- Bladderwrack (Fucus vesiculosus)
- Channelled wrack (Pelvetia canaliculata)
- Hijiki or Hiziki (Sargassum fusiforme)
- Labi labi (Turbinaria conoides)
- Limu kala (Sargassum echinocarpum)
- Sargassum
  - Sargassum cinetum
  - Sargassum vulgare
  - Sargassum swartzii
  - Sargassum myriocysum
- Spiral wrack (Fucus spiralis)
- Thongweed (Himanthalia elongata)

==== Ectocarpales ====
- Balbalulang (Hydroclathrus clathratus)
- Mozuku (Cladosiphon okamuranus)
- Rau ngoai (Chnoospora minima)

== Toxicity ==
Most edible seaweeds are marine algae whereas most freshwater algae are toxic. Some marine algae contain acids that irritate the digestion canal, while others can have a laxative and electrolyte-balancing effect. Most marine macroalgae are nontoxic in normal quantities, but members of the genus Lyngbya are potentially lethal. Typically, poisoning is caused by eating fish which have fed on Lyngbya or on other fish which have done so. Handling Lyngbya majuscula can also cause seaweed dermatitis. Some species of Desmarestia are highly acidic, with vacuoles of sulfuric acid that can cause severe gastrointestinal disorders.

== Uses ==
=== Nutrition ===
Seaweeds are a good source of nutrients such as proteins, vitamins, minerals, and dietary fiber. Polyphenols, polysaccharides, and sterols, as well as other bioactive molecules, are mainly responsible for the healthy properties associated with seaweed. Compared to terrestrial plants, they have a higher proportion of essential fatty acids as eicosapentaenoic (EPA) and docosahexaenoic (DHA) fatty acids.

Seaweed contains high levels of iodine, tyrosine relative to other foods. It is also rich in calcium and magnesium. Seaweed is a possible vegan source of Vitamin B12. The vitamin is obtained from symbiotic bacteria. However, the Academy of Nutrition and Dietetics considers seaweed to be an unreliable source of Vitamin B12 for human nutrition.

Edible red macroalgae such as Palmaria palmata (Dulse), Porphyra tenera (Nori), and Eisenia bicyclis have been measured as a relevant source of "alternative protein, minerals, and, eventually, fiber."

Seaweeds are rich in polysaccharides that could potentially be exploited as prebiotic functional ingredients for both human and animal health applications. Prebiotics are non-digestible, selectively fermented compounds that stimulate the growth and/or activity of beneficial gut microbiota which, in turn, confer health benefits on the host. In addition, there are several secondary metabolites that are synthesized by algae such as terpenoids, oxylipins, phlorotannins, volatile hydrocarbons, and products of mixed biogenetic origin. Therefore, algae can be considered as a natural source of great interest, since they contain compounds with numerous biological activities and can be used as a functional ingredient in many technological applications to obtain functional foods. Polysaccharides in seaweed may be metabolized in humans through the action of bacterial gut enzymes. Such enzymes are frequently produced in Japanese population due to their consumption of seaweeds.

As a nutraceutical product, some edible seaweeds are associated with anti-inflammatory, anti-allergic, antimutagenic, antitumor, antidiabetic, antioxidant, antihypertensive and neuroprotective properties.

=== Culinary ===
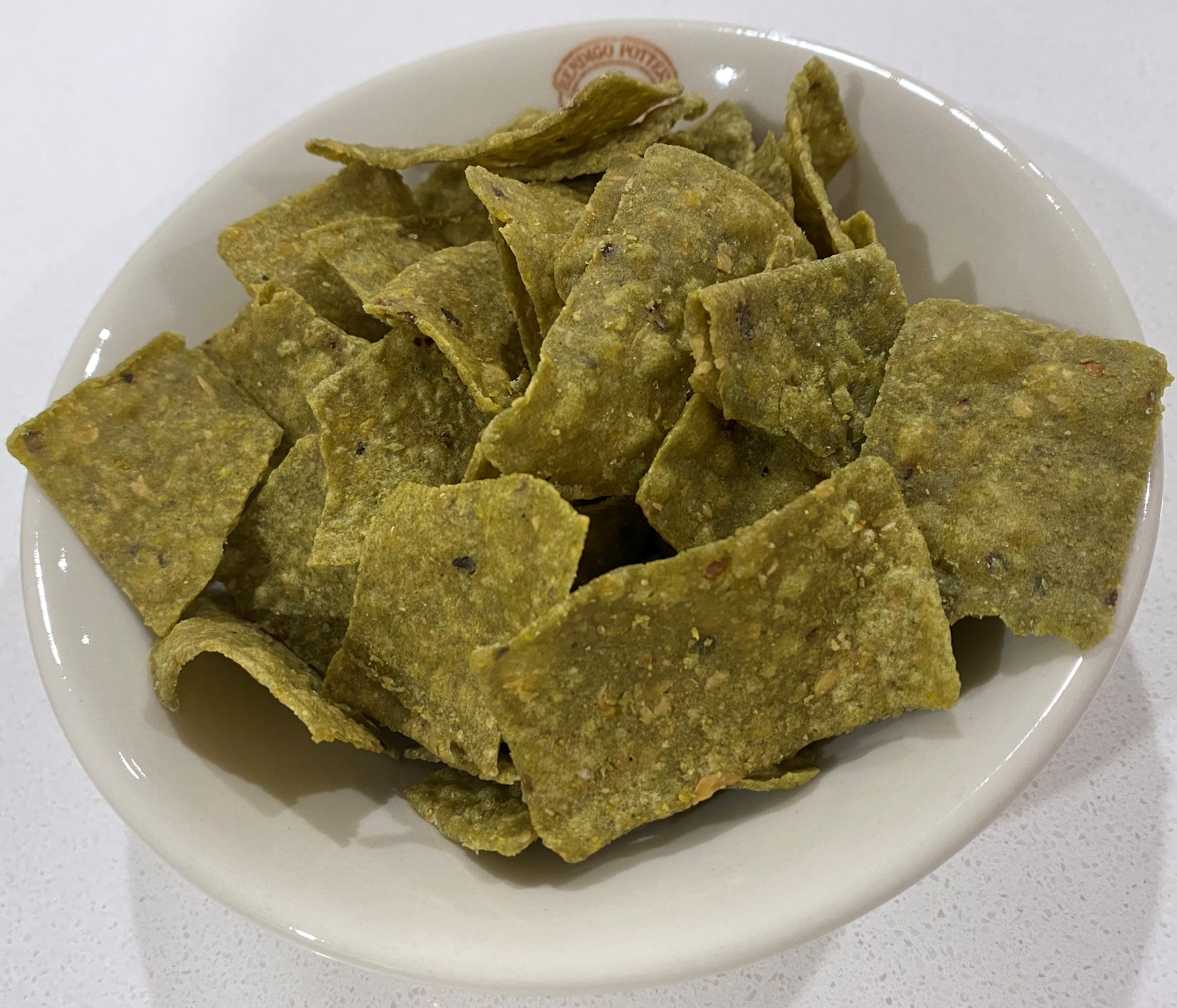
Corn chips flavoured and coloured with green algae Ulva spp. farmed in NSW, Australia

Seaweeds are used extensively as food in coastal cuisines around the world, particularly in East Asia, Southeast Asia, and the Pacific Islands. Edible seaweeds are especially prominent in the cuisines of China, Japan, Korea, the Philippines, and Hawaii. Seaweeds are also traditionally consumed in Indonesia, Malaysia, Singapore, Vietnam, Myanmar, and Sri Lanka, as well as in the islands of Micronesia, Melanesia, and Polynesia. The Māori people of New Zealand traditionally used a few species of red and green seaweed, Several species are also eaten by Indigenous Australians.

Seaweed is also consumed in many traditional European societies, in Iceland and western Norway, the Atlantic coast of France, northern and western Ireland, Scotland, Wales and some coastal parts of South West England, as well as New Brunswick, Nova Scotia, and Newfoundland and Labrador. Cooking with seaweed flakes has become more and more popular in the western hemisphere.

Chondrus crispus (commonly known as Irish moss) is another red alga used in producing various food additives, along with Kappaphycus and various gigartinoid seaweeds.

Seaweed appears in:

- (as Nori) wrapped sushi, maki
- soup, stew, hot pot
- salad
- snacks (e.g. Tong Garden, Dae Chun Gim)
- garnish (furikake)
- instant noodles (e.g. Jongga, Four Seas, Nongshim)

=== Animal consumption ===
It can be used as food for livestock and fish (in aquariums and fish farms).

Feeding the seaweed Asparagopsis taxiformis to cows can reduce their methane emissions.

=== East Asia ===
In some parts of Asia, nori 海苔 (in Japan and Taiwan), zicai 紫菜 (in China), and gim 김 (in Korea), sheets of the dried red alga Porphyra are used in soups or to wrap sushi or onigiri.

Japanese cuisine has common names for seven types of seaweed, and thus the term for seaweed in Japanese is used primarily in scientific applications, and not in reference to food.

Agar-agar (kanten 寒天) is also widely used as a substitute for gelatin. Its use in Japan is believed to have been discovered accidentally by an innkeeper named Mino Tarōzaemon in the 17th century. However this origin is legendary.

The dish often served in western Chinese restaurants as 'Crispy Seaweed' is not seaweed but cabbage that has been dried and then fried.

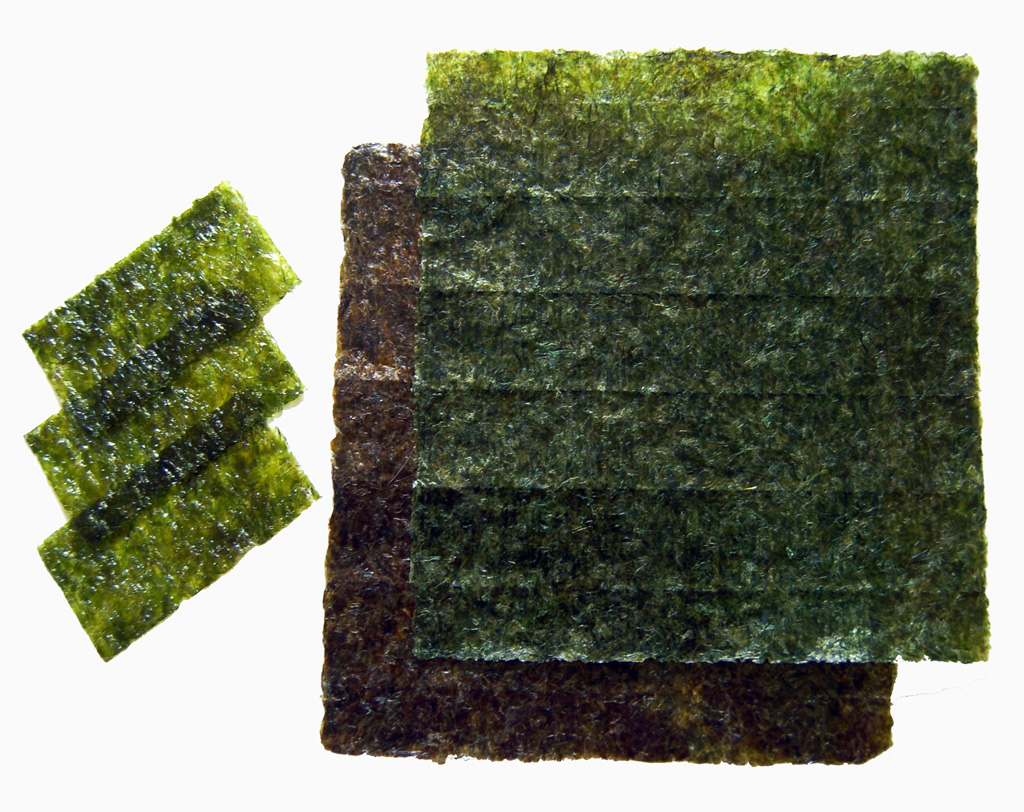
Roasted sheets of nori are used to wrap sushi

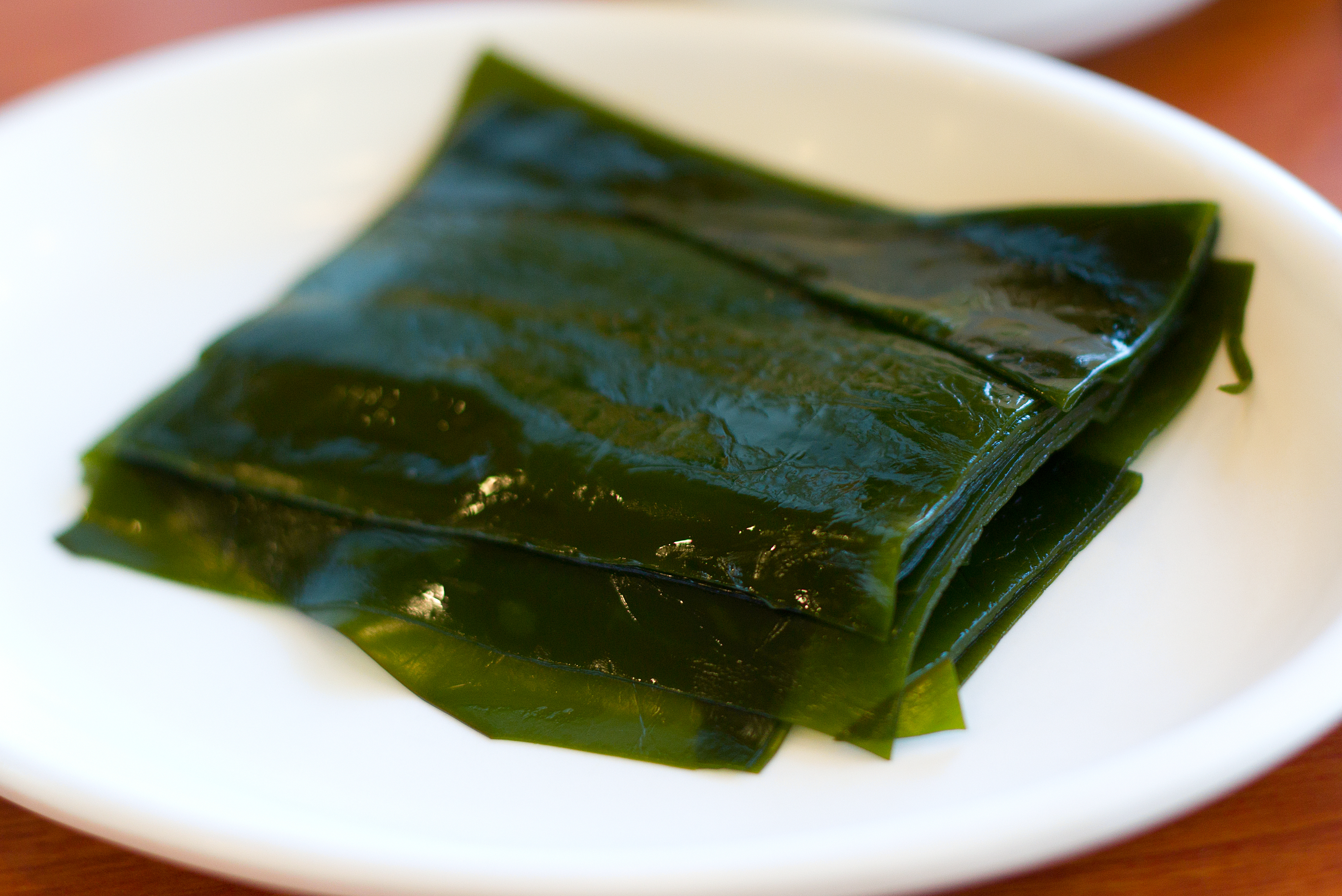
Dasima (kelp)

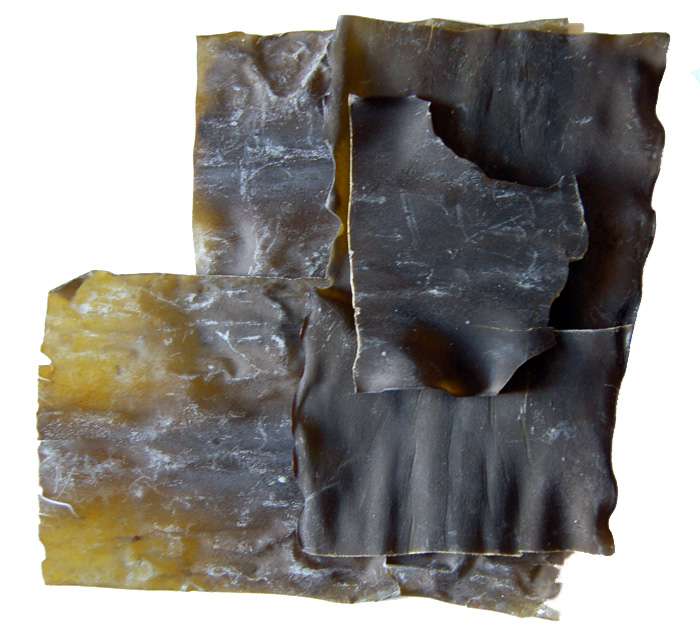
Kombu

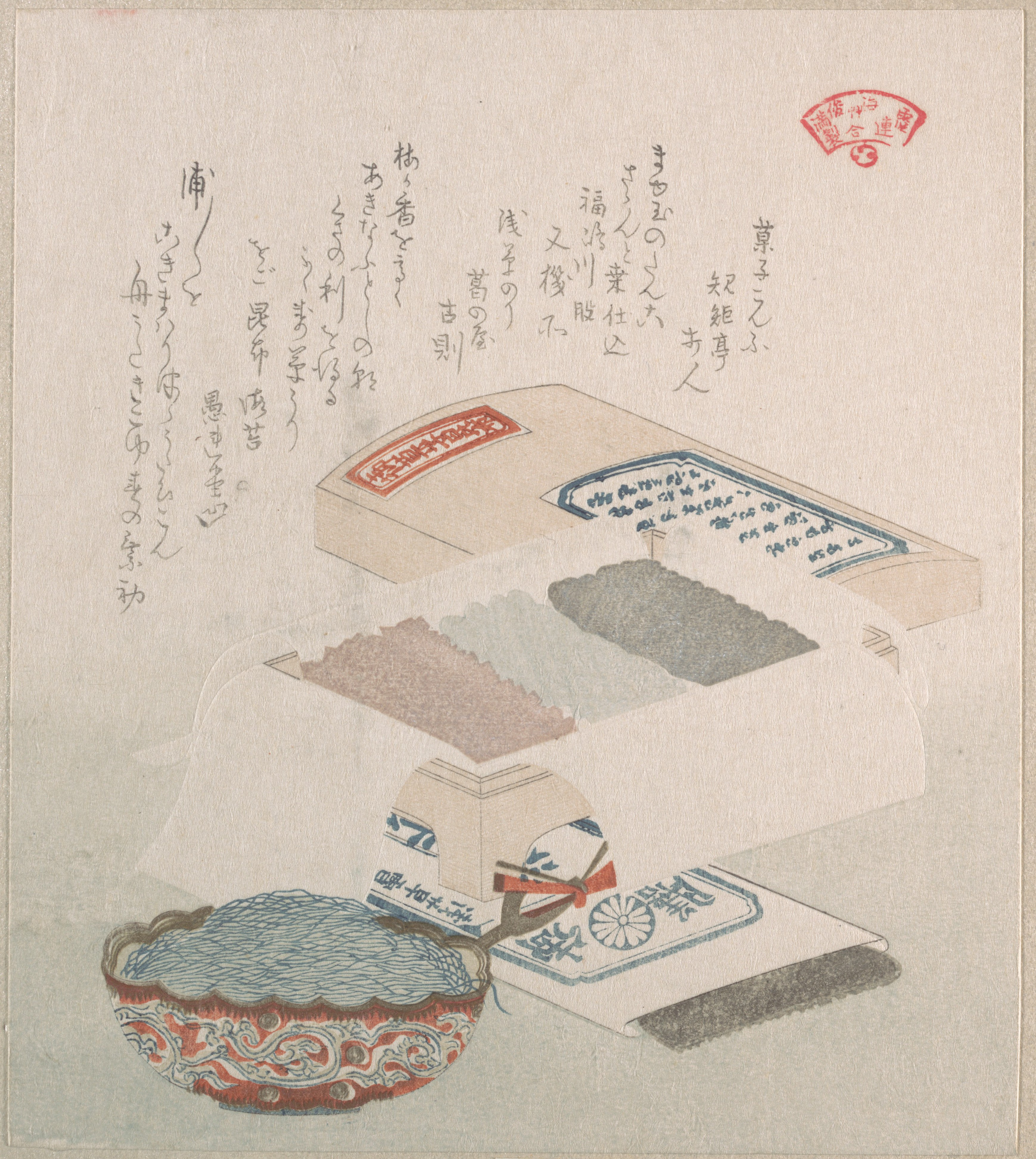
Cakes and Food Made of Seaweed by Kubo Shunman, 19th century

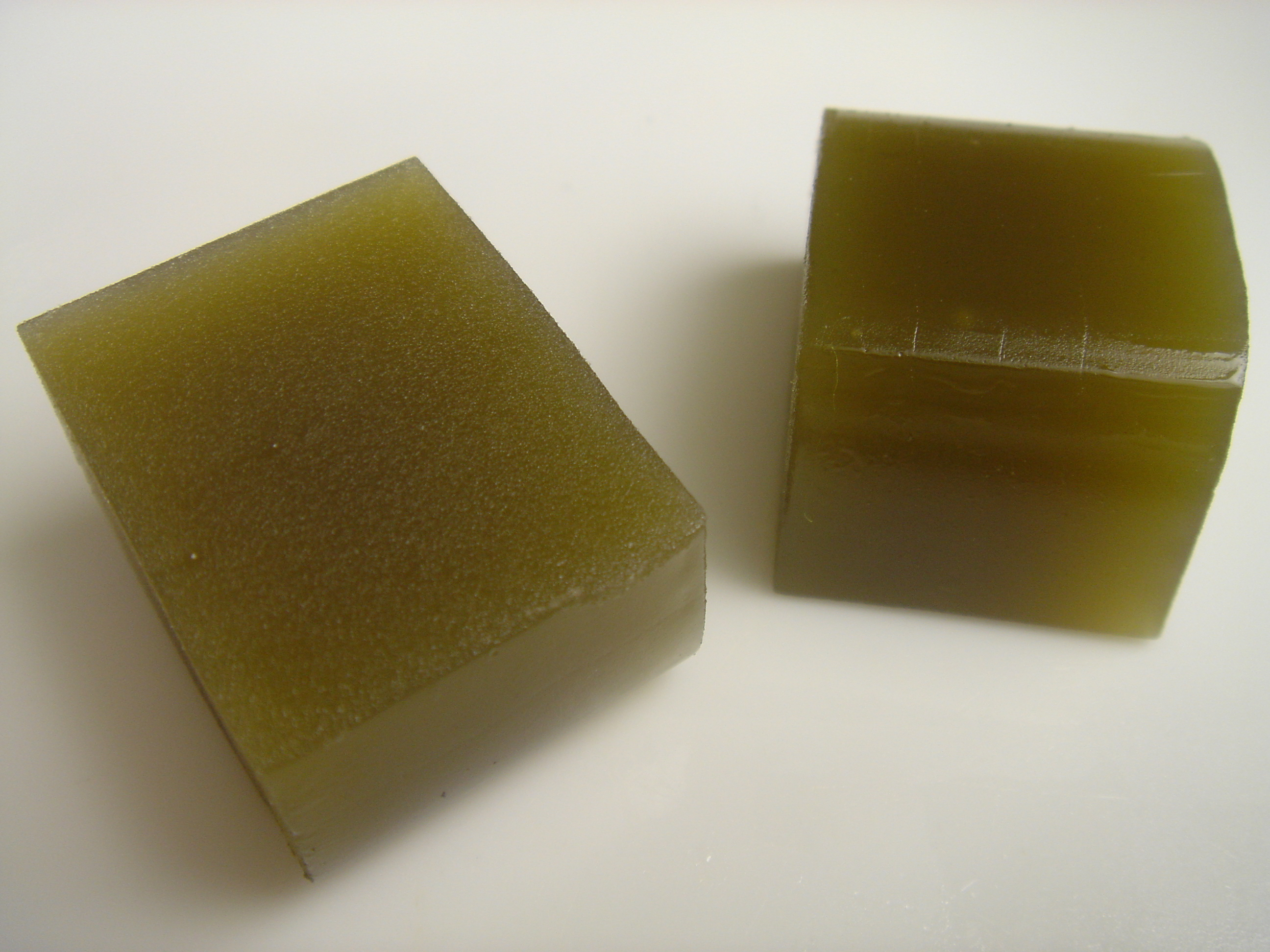
Green tea flavored yōkan, a popular Japanese red bean jelly made from agar

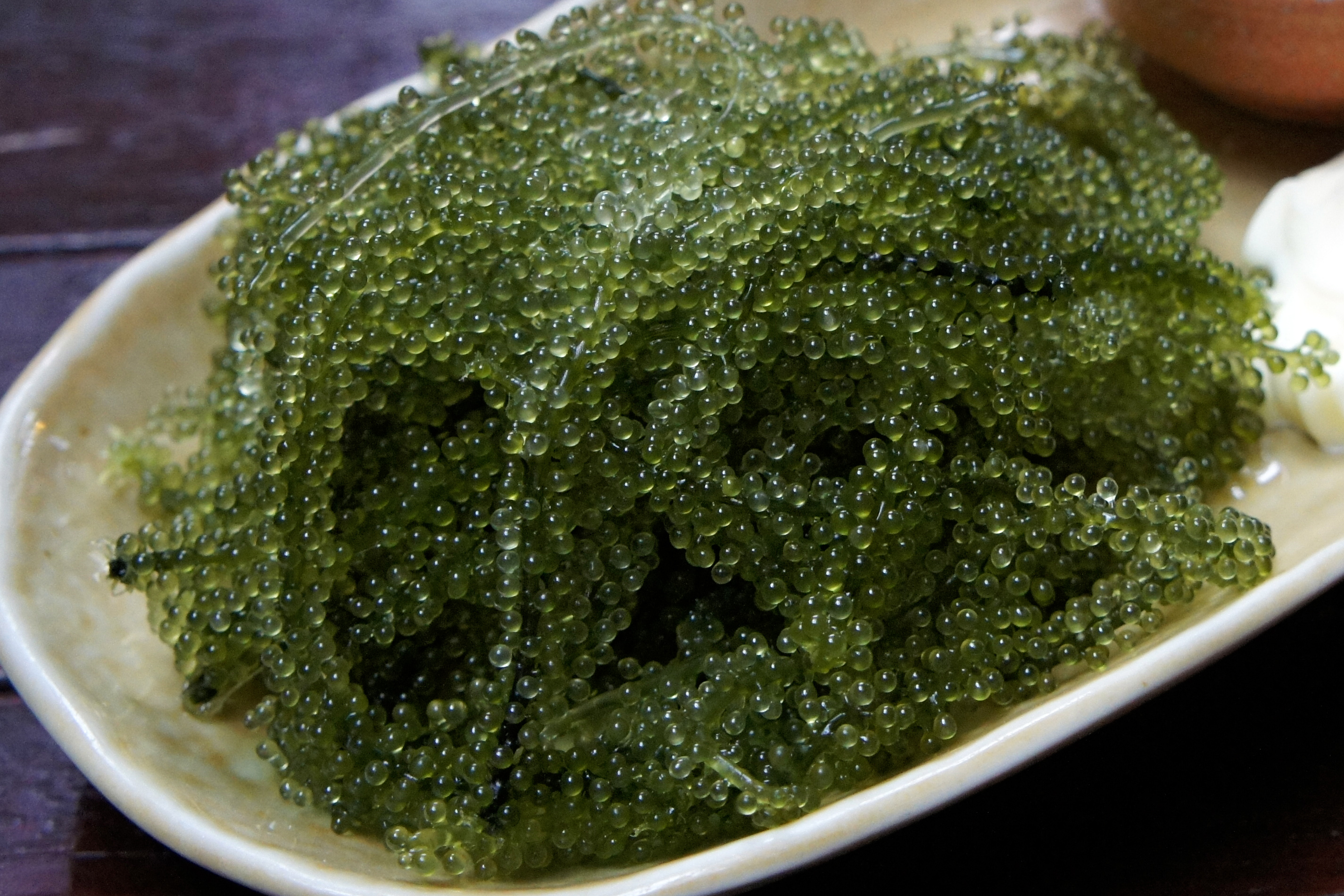
Sea grapes, a tropical edible seaweed, are also eaten in Japan.

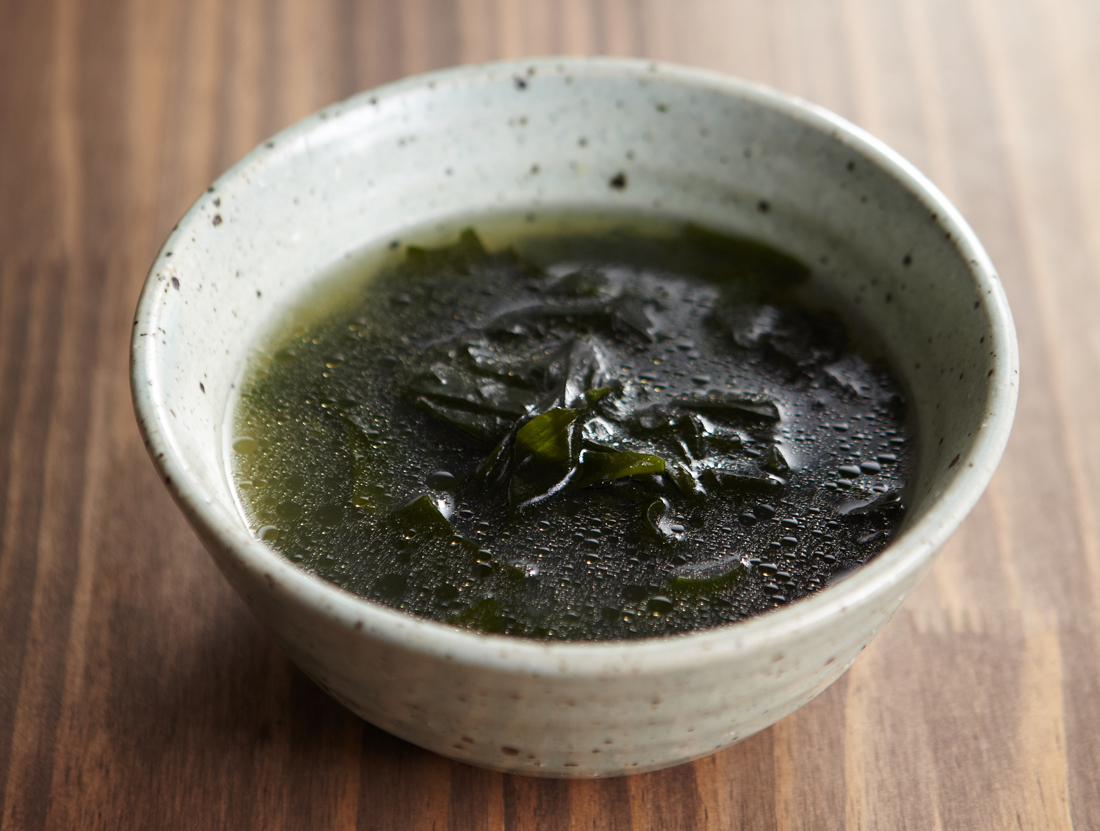
Wakame (Undaria pinnatifida) is a kelp used in South Korea and Japan.

=== Southeast Asia ===
Sea grapes (Caulerpa lentillifera and Caulerpa racemosa) and Gusô (Eucheuma spp.) are traditionally eaten in the cuisines of Southeast Asia (as well as in Oceania). These edible warm-water seaweed were first commercially cultivated in the Philippines. In the northern Philippines, the cold-water red seaweeds Porphyra atropurpurea, Pyropia vietnamensis, Halymenia formosa, and related species are also traditionally harvested from the wild and dried into black nori-like sheets called gamet which are used as ingredients in cooking.

Numerous other species of seaweeds are traditionally eaten in Southeast Asia, mainly in the Philippines, but also in Indonesia (especially eastern Indonesia), Malaysia, Singapore, Vietnam, and Myanmar. These include some members of the genera Chaetomorpha, Enteromorpha, Hydroclathatrus, Padina, Sargassum, Palisada, Agardhiella, Gracilaria, Halymenia, Laurencia, Hypnea, Liagora, and Sarcodia.

In the Philippines, a traditional gelling ingredient is gulaman, which is made from agar (first attested in Spanish dictionaries in 1754) and carrageenan (first attested in c.1637) traditionally extracted mainly from Gracilaria spp. and Eucheuma spp. that grow in shallow marine coastal areas in the Philippines. In modern times, they are also mass-produced in the pioneering tropical seaweed farming industry in the country. It is also used as a substitute for gelatin. It is widely used in various traditional desserts. Carrageenan as a gelatin substitute has also spread to other parts of Southeast Asia, like in Indonesia, where it is used for desserts like es campur.

Seaweed is also processed into noodles by residents of Tiwi, Albay, which can be cooked into pancit canton, pancit luglug, spaghetti or carbonara.

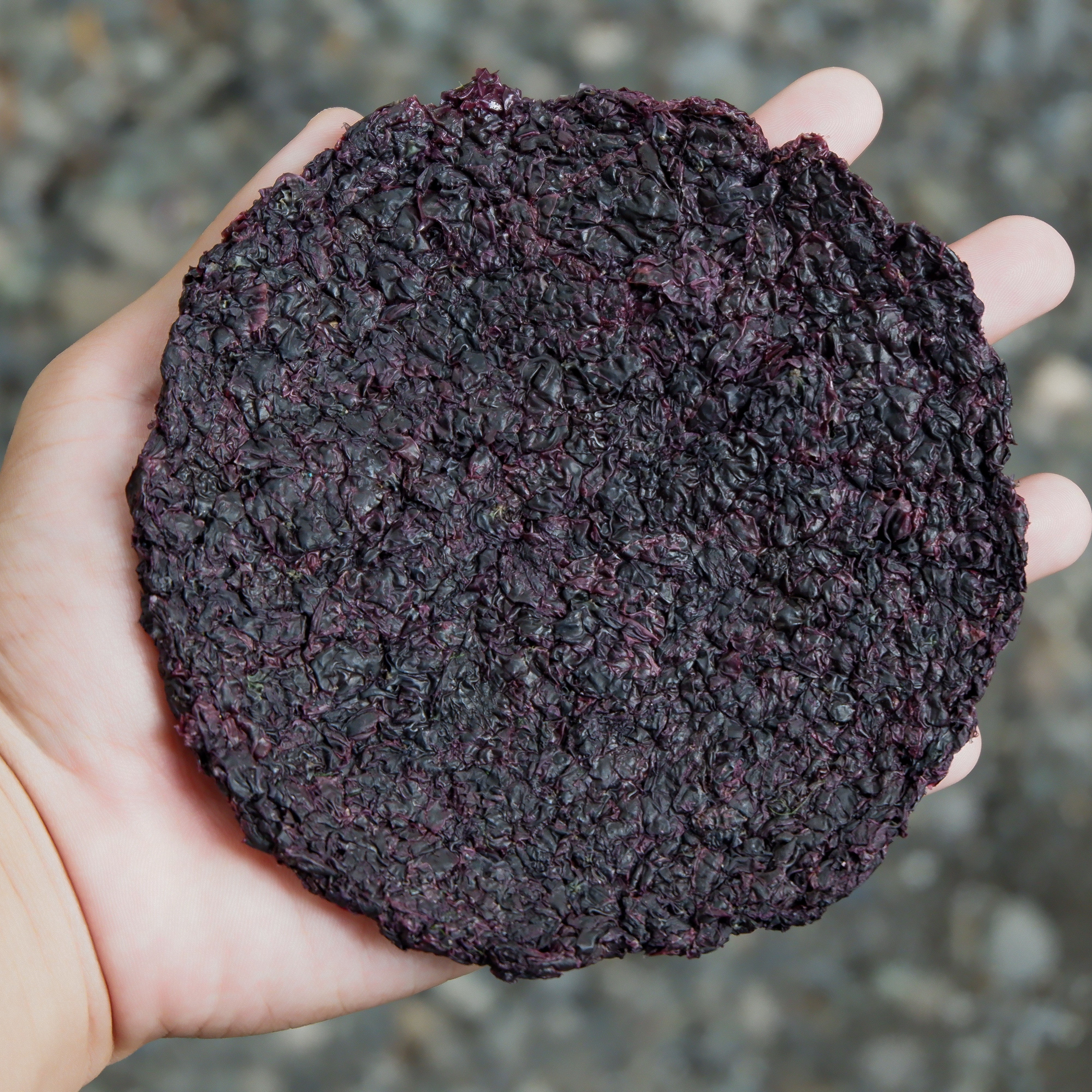
A disc of dried gamet from the Northern Luzon, Philippines

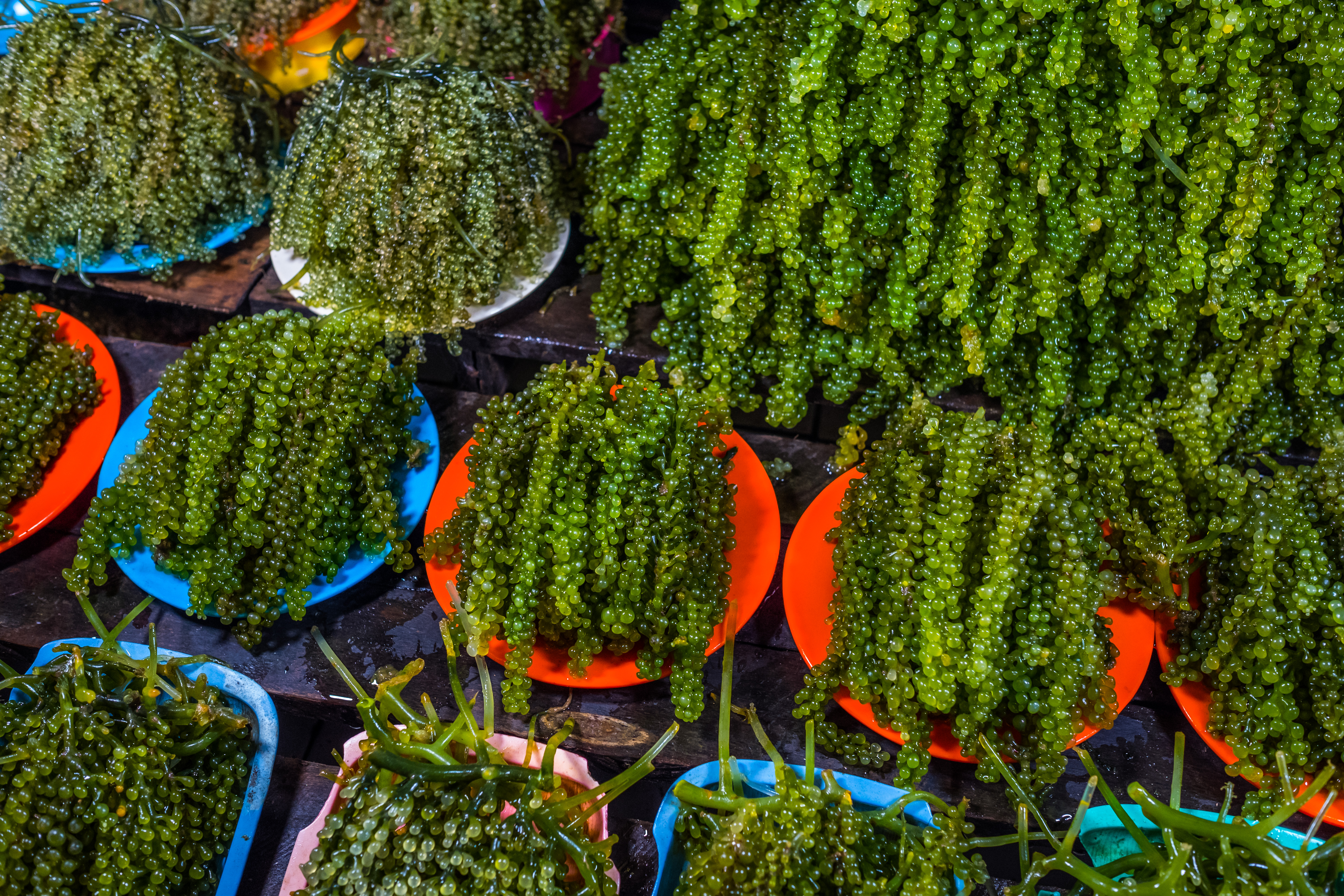
Sea grapes (Caulerpa lentillifera) were originally cultivated in the Philippines. They are usually eaten raw with vinegar, as a snack or in a salad.

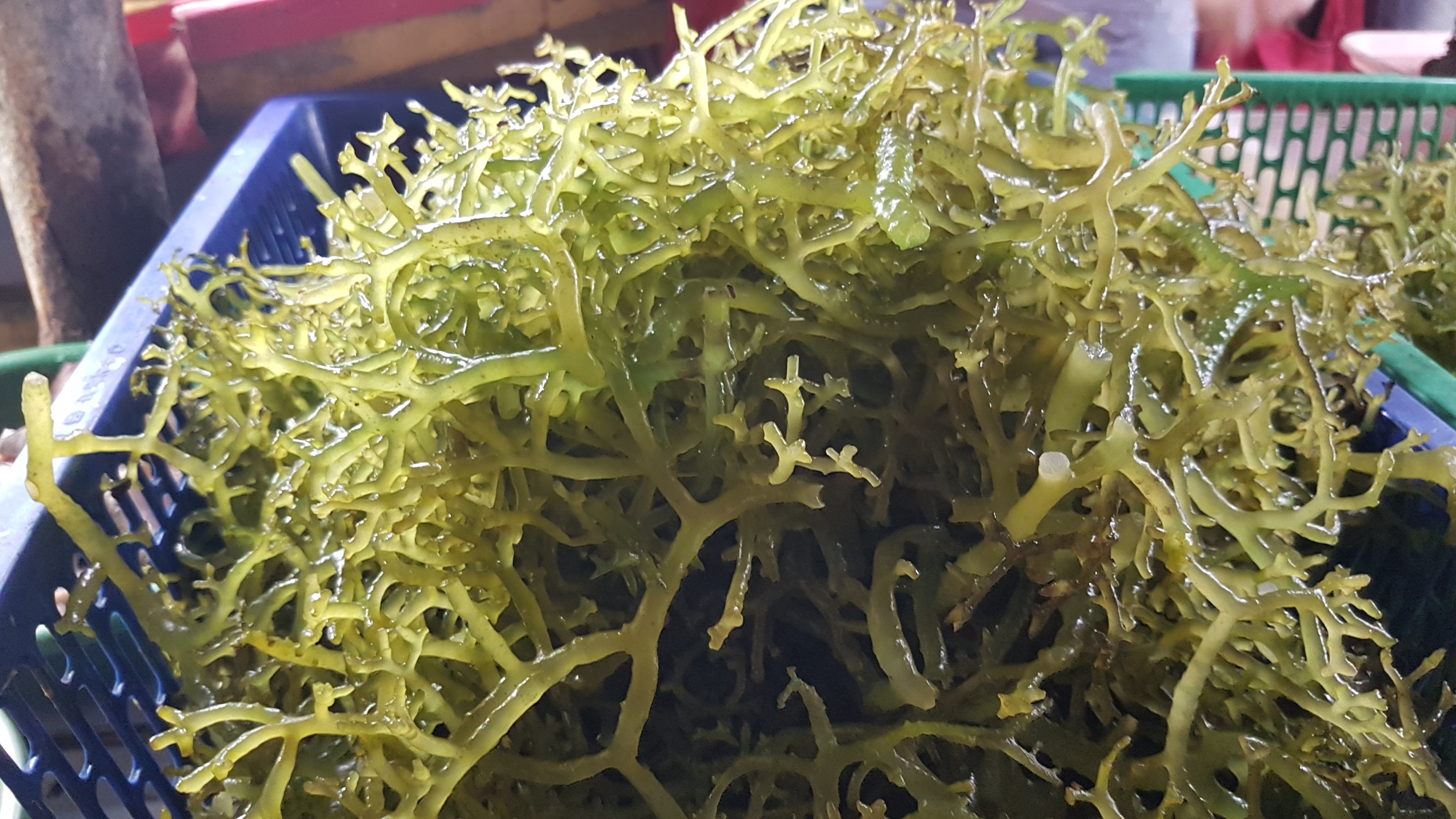
Gusô (Eucheuma spp.), anedible tropical seaweed species originally cultivated in the Philippines. They are eaten fresh or processed into carrageenan.

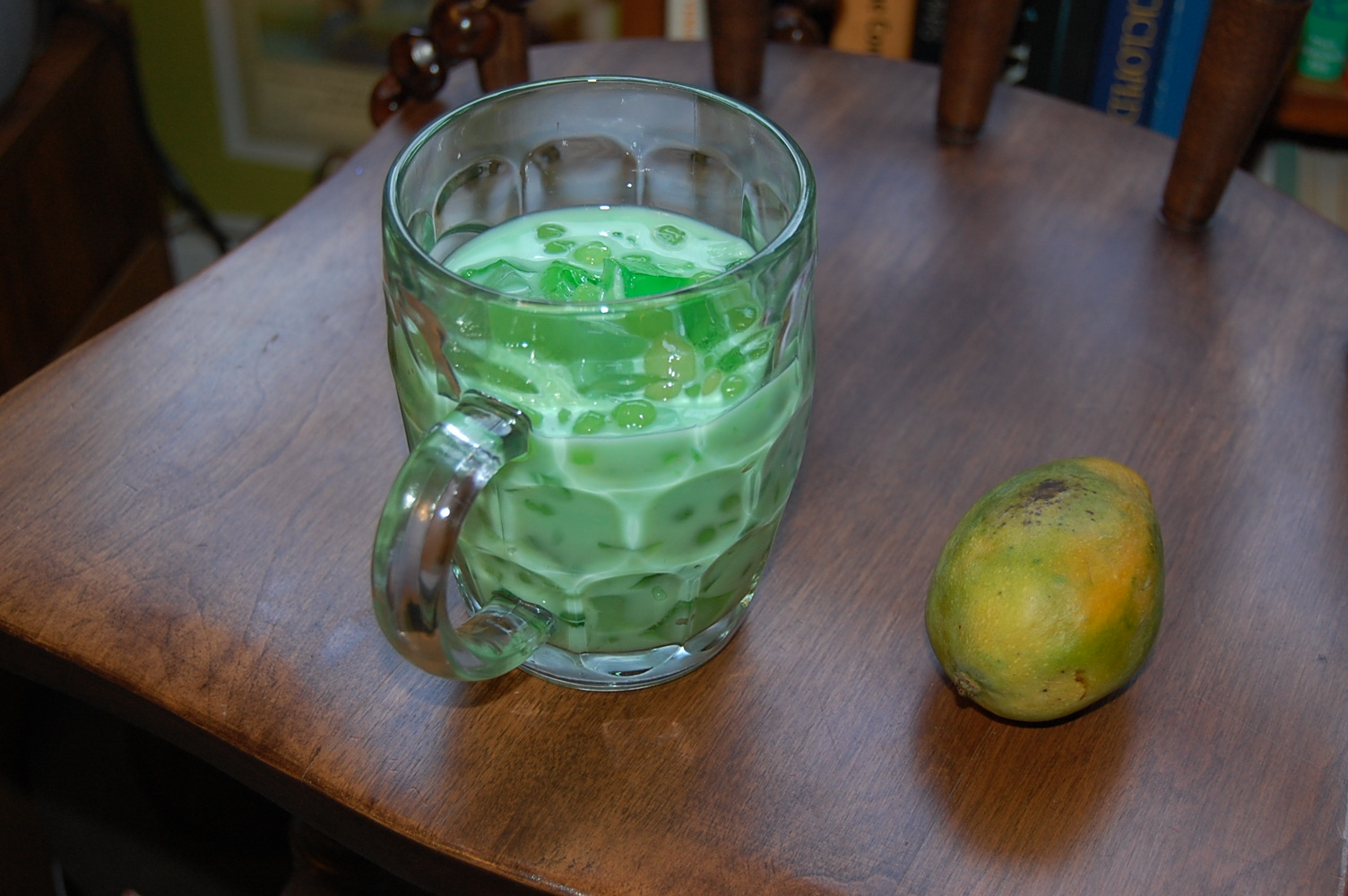
Buko pandan, a dessert beverage from the Philippines made with flavored cubes of jellylike gulaman, made from agar or carrageenan

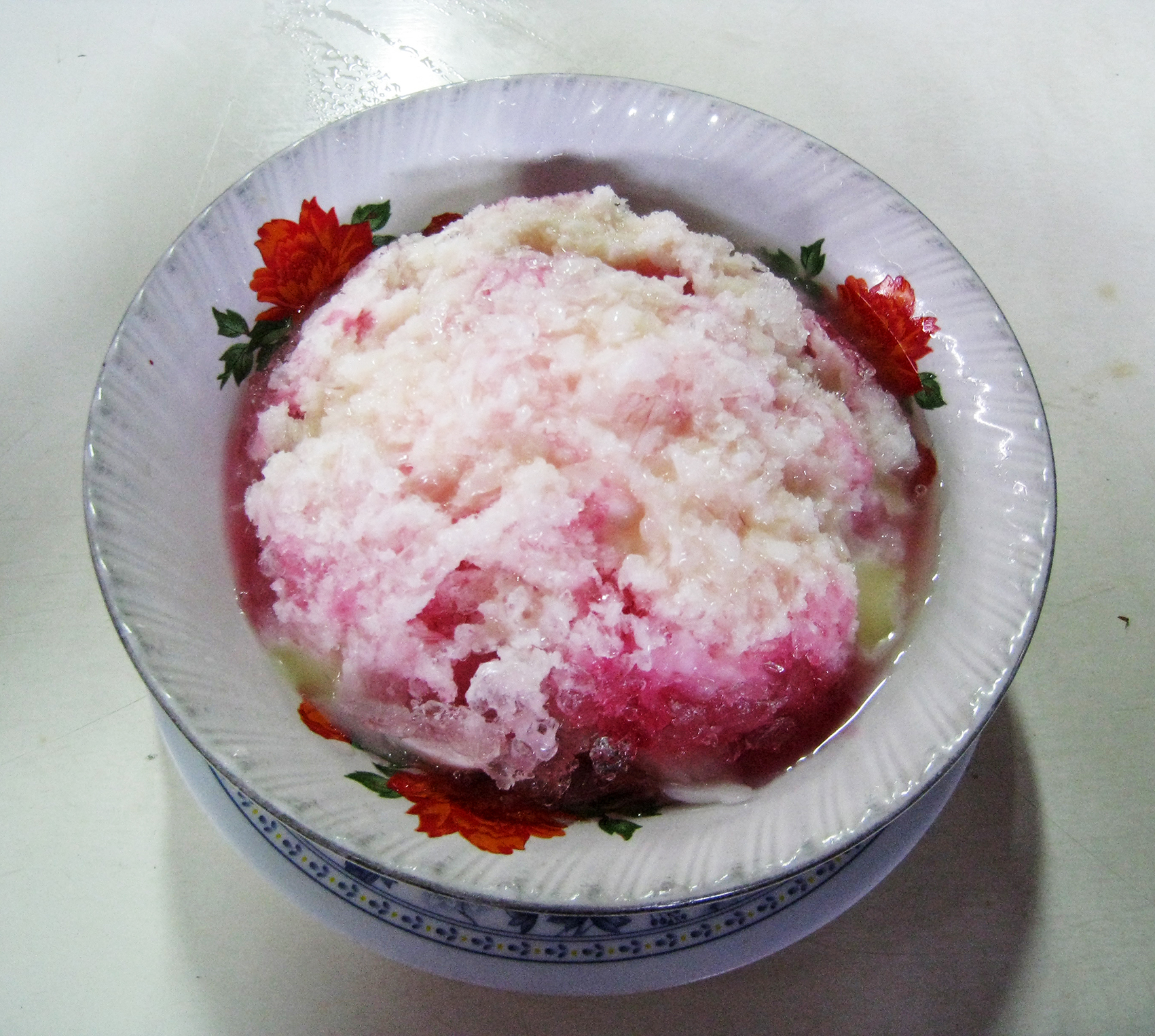
Es campur, a popular dessert from Indonesia which also use carrageenan jellies

== See also ==
- Aquaculture of giant kelp – Cultivation of seaweed
- Seaweed farming – Farming of aquatic seaweed
- Seaweed oil
