= Laverbread =

Food made from edible seaweed

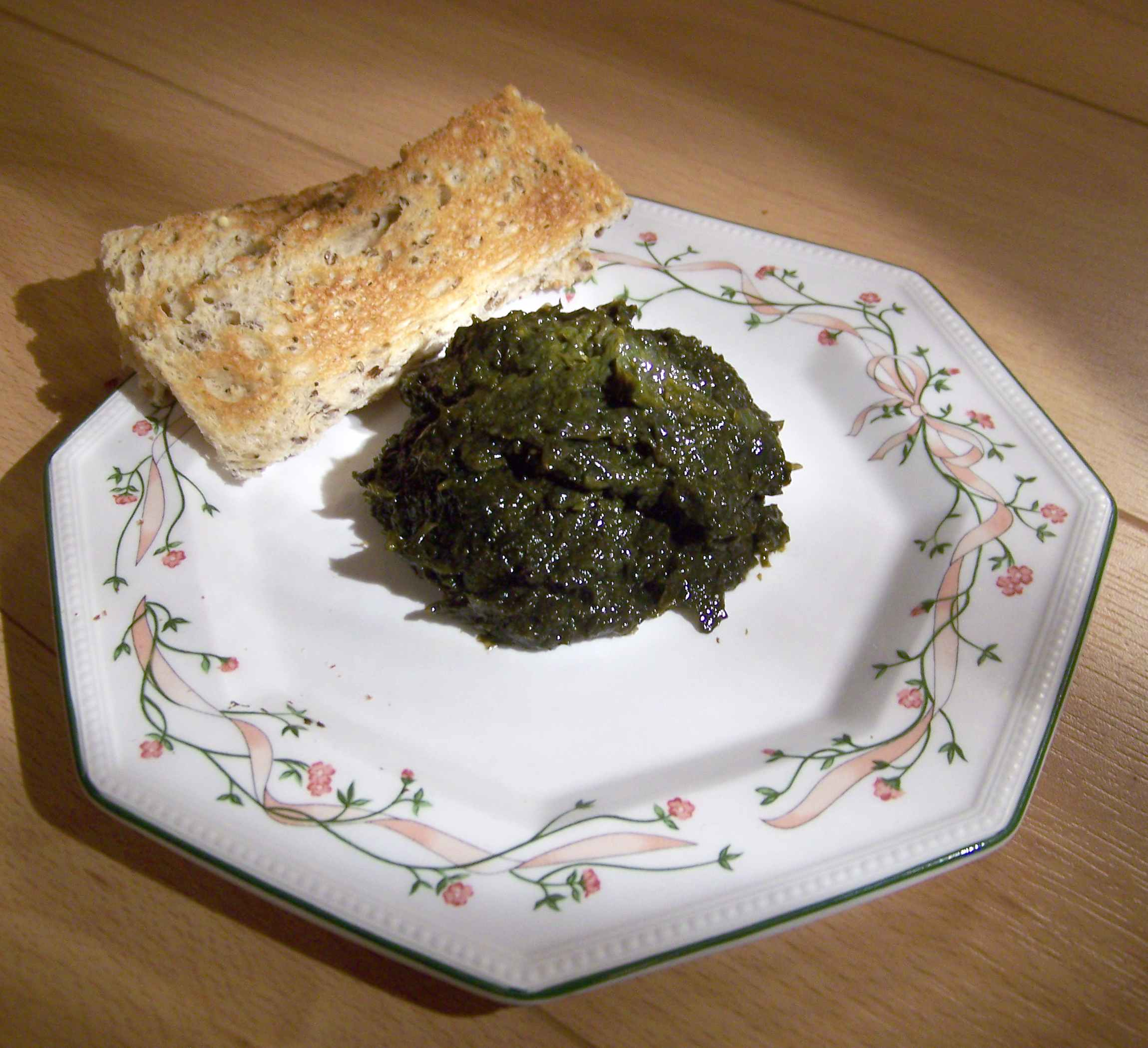
Laverbread and toast

Laverbread (/ˈleɪvər-, ˈlɑːvər-/; Welsh: bara lafwr or bara lawr; Irish: sleabhac) is a food product made from laver, an edible seaweed (littoral alga) consumed mainly in Wales as part of local traditional cuisine. The seaweed is commonly found around the west coast of Great Britain, and the coasts of Ireland, where it is known as sleabhac. It is smooth in texture and forms delicate, sheetlike thalli, often clinging to rocks. The principal variety is Porphyra umbilicalis, a red alga which tends to be a brownish colour, but boils down to a dark green pulp when prepared. Laver seaweed has a high content of dietary minerals, particularly iodine and iron. The high iodine content gives the seaweed a distinctive flavour in common with olives and oysters.

Laver seaweed has been cultivated as a food in Wales since at least the 17th century. It is prepared by repeated washings and then boiling until it becomes the soft purée-like product known as laverbread. The gelatinous paste that results can then be sold as it is or rolled in oatmeal. It is sometimes also coated with oatmeal prior to frying. Laverbread is traditionally eaten fried with bacon and cockles as part of a Welsh breakfast or, in the southwest of England, with hog's pudding.

As is the case with sweetbread, laverbread is not an actual bread product.

== The alga ==
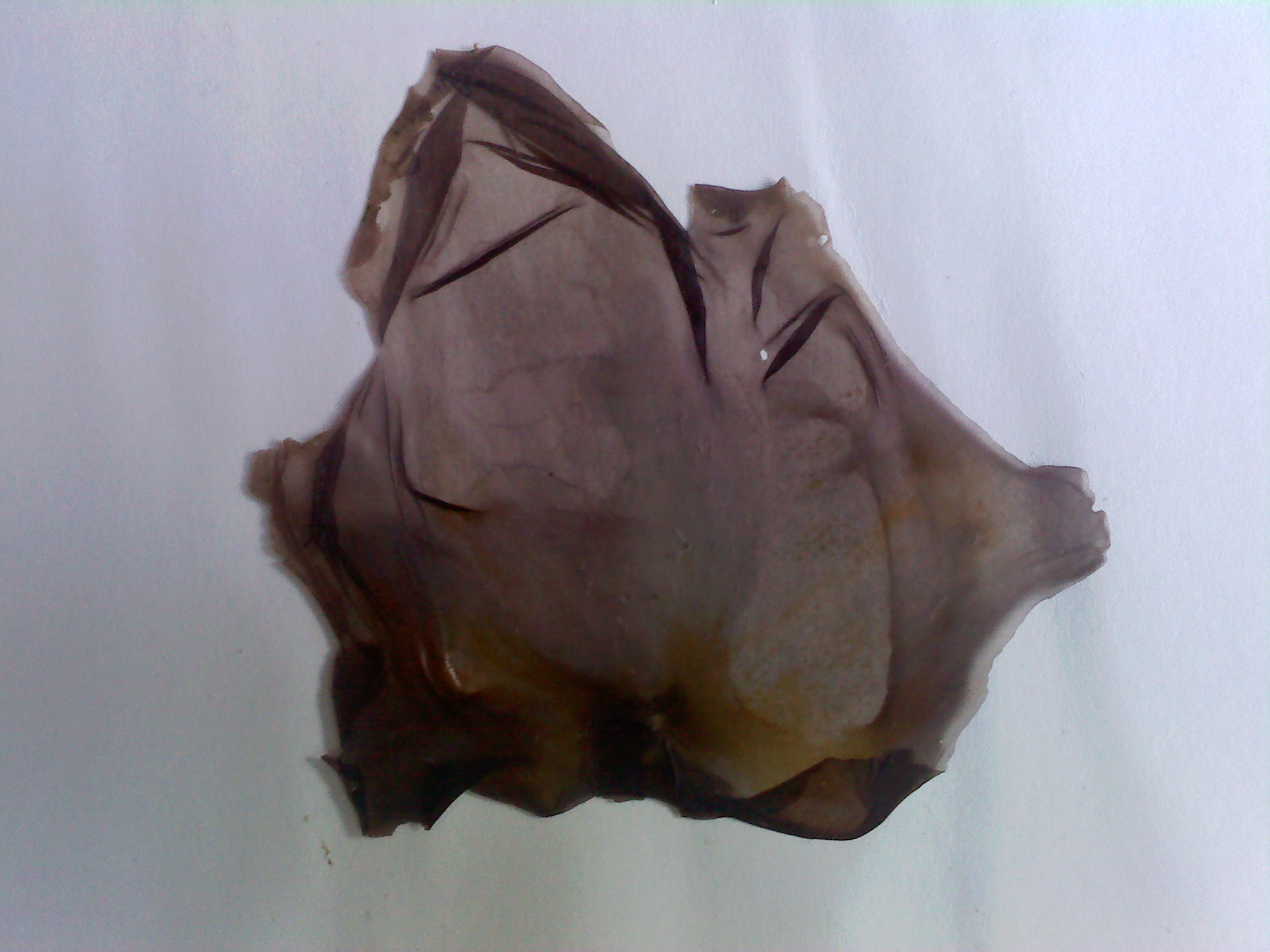
The seaweed Porphyra umbilicalis which is used to make laverbread

Laverbread is made from the seaweed Porphyra umbilicalis from the genus Porphyra and family Bangiaceae. The seaweed is commonly found around the west coast of Great Britain and east coast of Ireland along the Irish Sea. Laver has a high content of dietary minerals, particularly iodine and iron. The high iodine content gives the seaweed a distinctive flavour in common with olives and oysters.

== Cultivation ==
Cultivation of laver seaweed as food is thought to be very ancient, though the first mention was in William Camden's Britannia in the early 17th century. Laver seaweed cultivation is typically associated with Wales, and it is still gathered off the Pembrokeshire and Carmarthenshire coasts, although similar farming methods are used at the west coast of Scotland.

== Preparation ==
Seaweed, laver, raw
Nutritional value per 100 g (3.5 oz)
- Energy: 146 kJ (35 kcal)
- Carbohydrates: 5.11 g
- Sugars: 0.49 g
- Dietary fiber: 0.3 g
- Fat: 0.28 g
- Protein: 5.81 g
Vitamins and minerals
Vitamins	Quantity %DV^{†}
Vitamin A equiv. beta-Carotene	29% 260 μg 29% 3121 μg
Thiamine (B1)	8% 0.098 mg
Riboflavin (B2)	34% 0.446 mg
Niacin (B3)	9% 1.47 mg
Pantothenic acid (B5)	10% 0.521 mg
Vitamin B6	9% 0.159 mg
Folate (B9)	37% 146 μg
Vitamin C	43% 39 mg
Vitamin E	7% 1 mg
Vitamin K	3% 4 μg
Minerals	Quantity %DV^{†}
Calcium	5% 70 mg
Iron	10% 1.8 mg
Manganese	43% 0.988 mg
Phosphorus	5% 58 mg
Potassium	12% 356 mg
Sodium	2% 48 mg
Zinc	10% 1.05 mg
- Link to USDA Database entry
- ^{†}Percentages estimated using US recommendations for adults, except for potassium, which is estimated based on expert recommendation from the National Academies.

It is plucked from the rocks and given a preliminary rinse in clear water. The collected laver seaweed is repeatedly washed to remove sand, then boiled until it becomes a stiff, green purée with a smooth consistency. Alternatively, steaming is utilised, which speeds up the process. Once prepared, the seaweed can be preserved for about a week. During the 18th century, the product was packed into a crock and sold as "potted laver". To make laverbread, a traditional Welsh delicacy, the seaweed is boiled for several hours, then minced or pureed. The gelatinous paste that results can then be sold as it is, or rolled in oatmeal; it is sometimes coated with oatmeal prior to frying.

Laverbread can be eaten cold as a salad with lamb or mutton. A simple preparation is to heat the laverbread and to add butter and the juice of a lemon or Seville orange. Laverbread can be heated and served with boiled bacon.

Laverbread is traditionally eaten fried with bacon and cockles as part of a Welsh breakfast. It can also be used to make a sauce to accompany lamb, crab, monkfish, etc., and to make laver soup (cawl lafwr). Richard Burton has been quoted as describing laverbread as "Welshman's caviar".

Laver seaweed is often associated with Penclawdd and its cockles, being used traditionally in the Welsh diet and is still eaten widely across Wales in the form of laverbread. In addition to Wales, laverbread is eaten across the Bristol Channel in North Devon, especially the Exmoor coast around Lynmouth, Combe Martin and Ilfracombe. In North Devon it is generally not cooked with oatmeal and is simply referred to as 'laver' (/ˈleɪvər/ LAY-ver). A Devon recipe often includes Hog's (white) pudding

Laverbread is highly nutritious because of its high proportions of protein, iron, and especially iodine. The dried purple (nori) variation is the main plant that contains significant amounts of vitamin B_{12}, which makes it the most suitable source of vitamin B_{12} available for vegans; consuming 4 g (0.1 oz) of dried purple laver provides the RDA of vitamin B_{12}.

== See also ==
- Palmaria palmata – Species of edible alga (dilisk, dilsk, dulse)
- Gamet – Dried edible seaweed from the Philippines
- Green laver – Type of edible green seaweed in East Asian cuisine
- Kombu – Edible kelp
- Tsukudani – Simmered Japanese side dish
- Mastocarpus stellatus – Species of edible alga (carrageenan moss)
- Nori – Edible seaweed species of the red algae genus Pyropia

== Bibliography ==
- Lamb, Leeks and Laverbread, Gilli Davies, Grafton (16 Mar 1989), ISBN 0-586-20139-4
