= Eucheuma serra =

Scientific classification
- Domain: Eukaryota
- Clade: Archaeplastida
- Division: Rhodophyta
- Class: Florideophyceae
- Order: Gigartinales
- Family: Solieriaceae
- Genus: Eucheuma
- Species: E. serra

Binomial name
- Eucheuma serra (J.Agardh) J.Agardh, 1847

Synonyms
- Sphaerococcus serra J.Agardh, 1841

Species of alga

Eucheuma serra is an edible red algae in the family Solieriaceae. Its scientific name derives from the Latin word describing resemblance to a saw. This species has been found to be a high yielding source of lectins.
