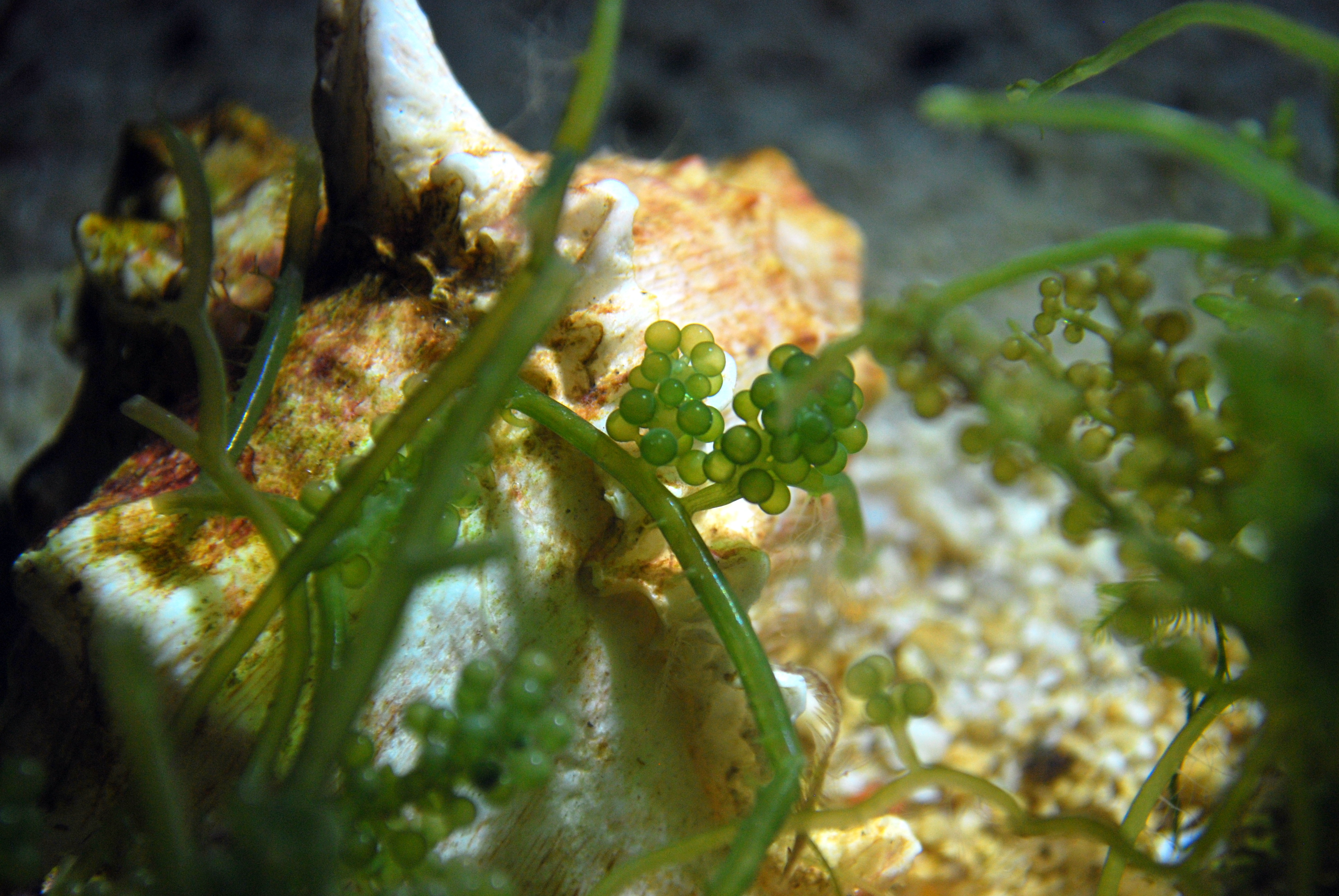
- Caulerpa lentillifera in Chonburi, Thailand

Scientific classification
- Kingdom: Plantae
- Division: Chlorophyta
- Class: Ulvophyceae
- Order: Bryopsidales
- Family: Caulerpaceae
- Genus: Caulerpa
- Species: C. lentillifera

Binomial name
- Caulerpa lentillifera J.Agardh, 1837

= Caulerpa lentillifera =

Species of seaweed

Caulerpa lentillifera or sea grape is a species of ulvophyte green algae from coastal regions in the Asia-Pacific. This seaweed is one of the favored species of edible Caulerpa due to its soft and succulent texture. It is traditionally eaten in the cuisines of Southeast Asia, Oceania, and East Asia. It was first commercially cultivated in the Philippines in the 1950s, followed by Japan in 1968. Both countries remain the top consumers of C. lentillifera. Its cultivation has since spread to other countries, including Vietnam and China. C. lentillifera, along with C. racemosa, are also known as sea grapes or green caviar in English.

It is a siphonous macroalgae, meaning it is a giant single cell with multiple nuclei, and can grow to 30 cm in length. Instead of leaves, the algae has bubbles that burst in the mouth, releasing an umami taste.

== Biology ==
C. lentillifera has a genome of 34Mb, which was sequenced at the University of Amsterdam and published on 21 January 2025 although it has yet to be assembled into chromosomes. Unusually it has just one Receptor-like kinase (RLK), normally the largest class of signal transduction components in plants.

== Commercial cultivation ==
Traditionally, C. lentillifera were harvested directly from the wild. The first commercial cultivation of C. lentillifera was in the 1950s in Cebu, Philippines, after accidental introduction of C. lentillifera to fish ponds. Currently, there are around 400 hectares of ponds on Cebu, producing around 12 to 15 tons of fresh C. lentillifera per year. They are usually harvested after two months from first planting, and every two weeks afterwards depending on growth rates.

Commercial cultivation was followed by Japan in 1986, where it was cultivated in tanks in the warmer waters of Okinawa. Commercial cultivation has since spread to other countries, including Vietnam, Taiwan, and China (in Fujian and Hainan). Most are for domestic consumption, but they are also exported to Japan.

== Culinary uses ==
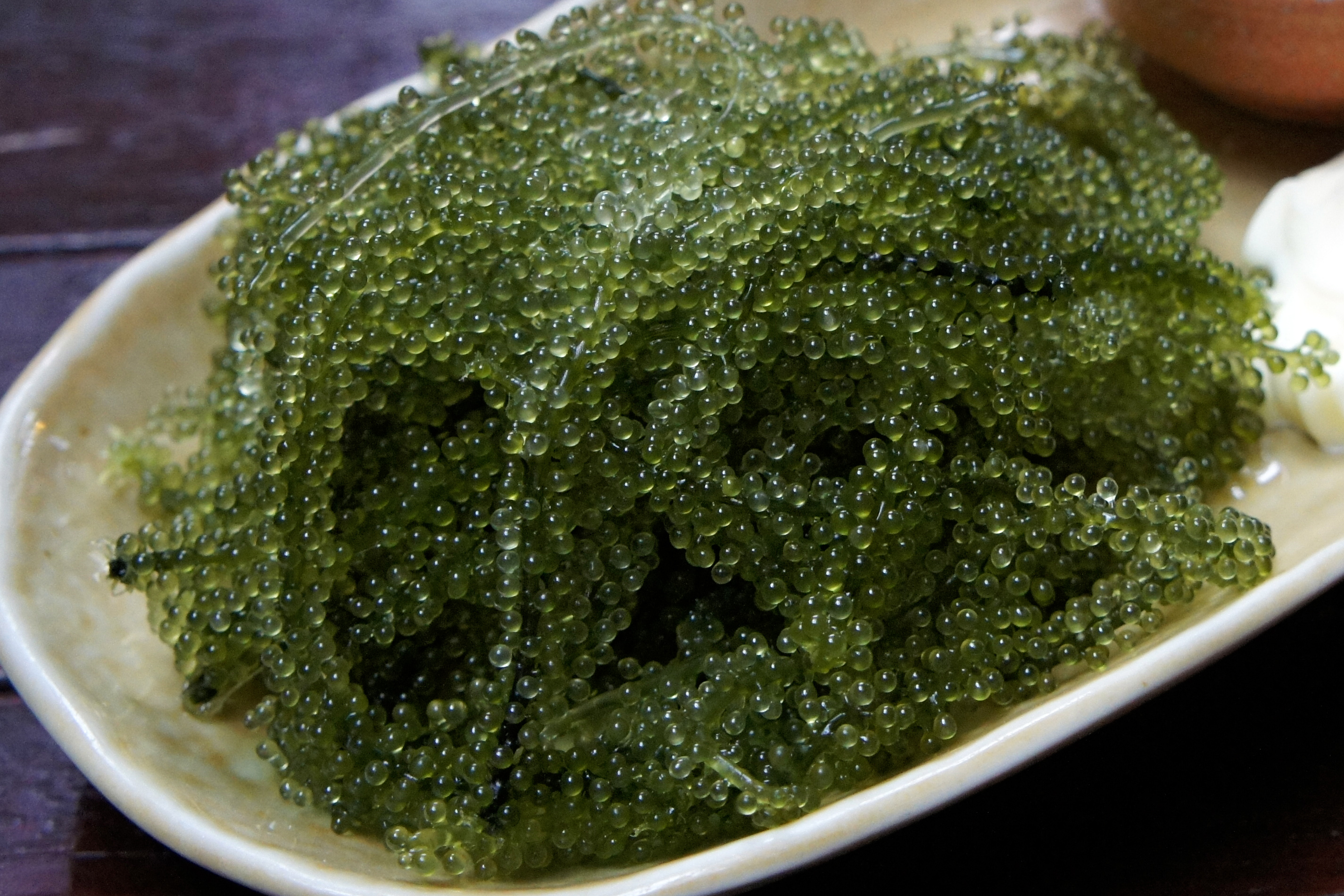
Umi-budō at Miyakojima, Okinawa prefecture, Japan

Caulerpa lentillifera, along with C. racemosa, have been traditionally eaten in the cuisines of Southeast Asia, Oceania, and East Asia. They are almost always eaten raw on their own or in salads. They have been described as tasting "like the ocean." It is known to be rich in iodine.

In the Philippines, C. lentillifera is usually known as latô or arosep. After being washed in clean water, it is usually eaten raw in salads (ensaladang latô), with chopped raw shallots and fresh tomatoes, and dressed with a blend of fish sauce or bagoóng (fish paste) and vinegar. Its popularity has also spread to the Malaysian state of Sabah (where it is spelled latok) due to the migrations of the Bajau peoples. They are also coveted by coastal Malay communities (as latoh) in the Riau Archipelago and Singapore, the latter until they were displaced inland late 20th century.

In Okinawa, Japan, it is known as umi-budō (海ぶどう), meaning "sea grapes", or kubiretsuta. It is served dipped in ponzu, made into sushi, added into salads, or eaten as is.

Caulerpa lentillifera is also eaten in Vietnam, where it is known as rong nho or rong nho biển, meaning "grape algae" or "sea grape algae"; in Korea, where it is known as bada podo (바다포도), also meaning "sea grapes"; and in Indonesia (particularly Bali), where it is known as bulung.

== Gallery ==
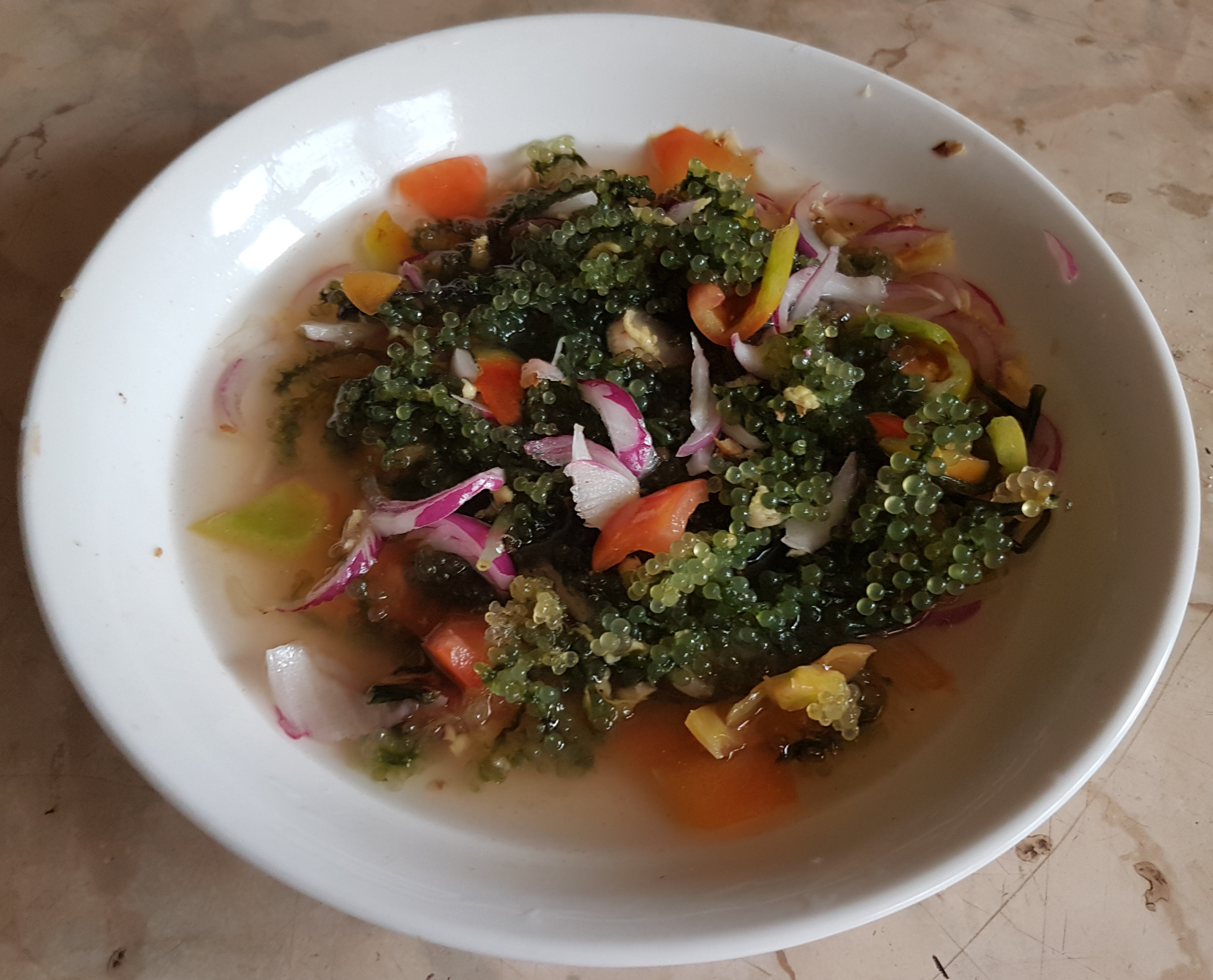
Ensaladang latô from the Philippines, prepared with vinegar, fish sauce, shallots, and tomatoes

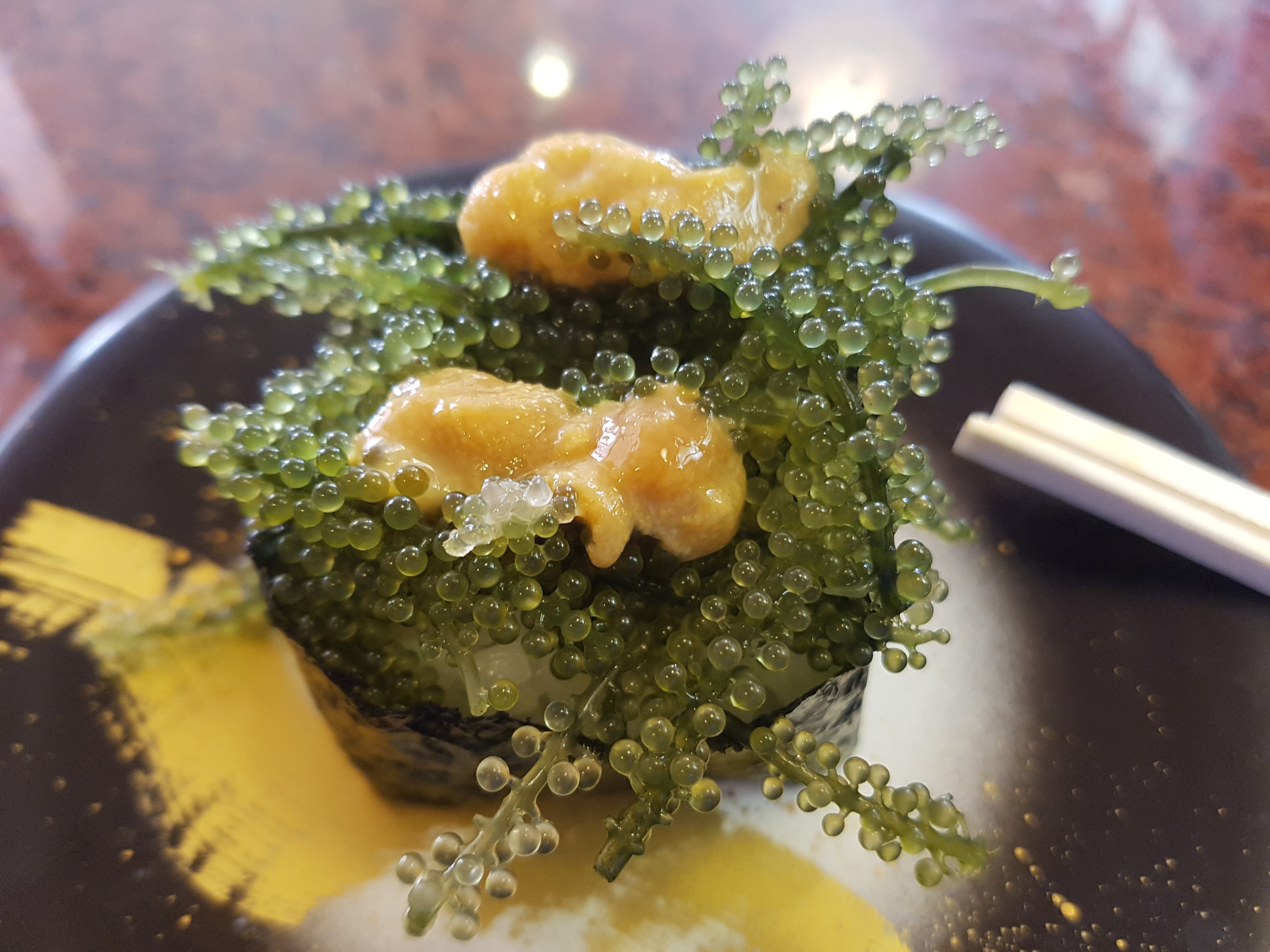
Umi-budō sushi

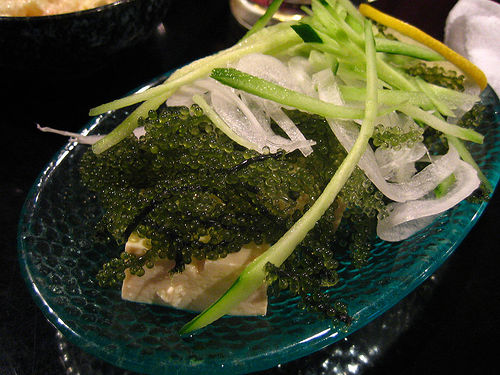
Umi-budō served Okinawan style

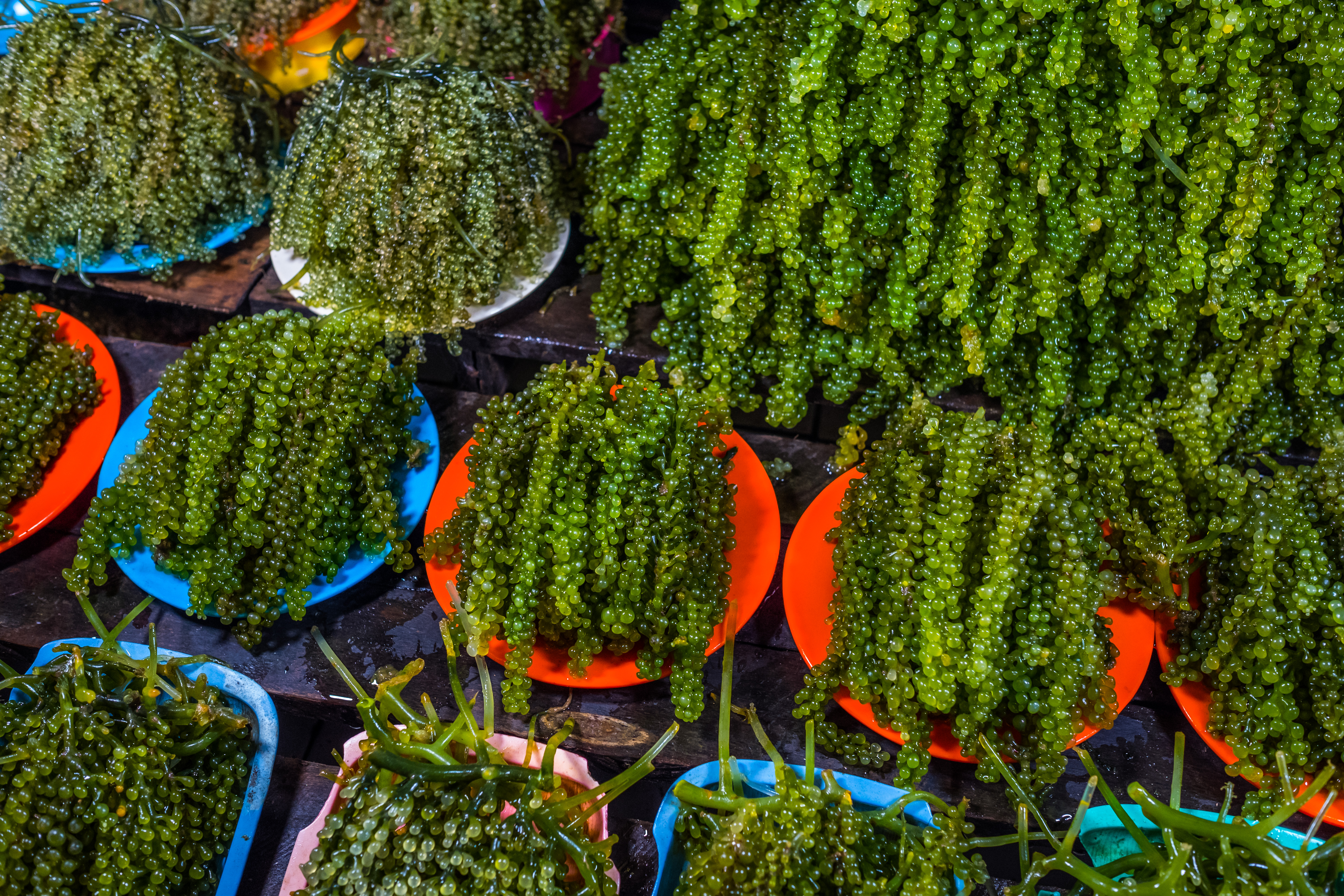
Fresh latô sold at a fish market in the Philippines

== See also ==
- Eucheuma (Gusô)
- Gamet
- Nori
- Sea lettuce
- Sea asparagus
