= Gamet =

Dried edible seaweed from the Philippines

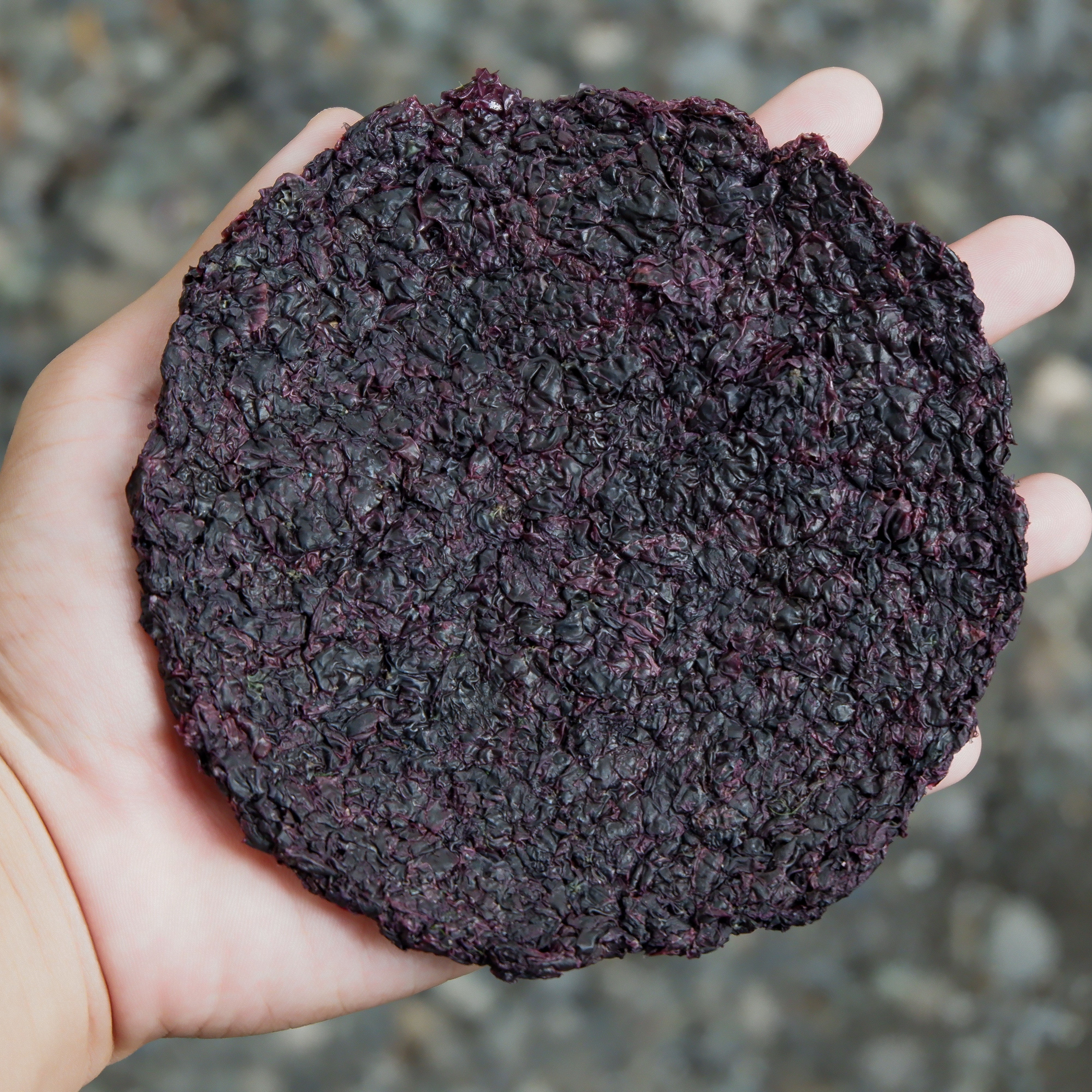
- A disc (pedazo) of gamet
- Course: edible seaweed
- Place of origin: Philippines
- Region or state: Ilocos Norte, Cagayan
- Similar dishes: Laverbread, nori, kombu

Gamet is a traditional dried edible seaweed from Ilocos Norte and Cagayan of the Philippines, particularly from the town of Burgos. Gamet are dried into sheets or thin cakes called pedazo (from Spanish for "piece"), which are characteristically purplish-black in color. It is used widely in soups, salads, omelets and other dishes, in the cuisines of the northern Philippines.

They are harvested from the red seaweed Porphyra atropurpurea, Pyropia vietnamensis (previously known as Porphyra marcosii), Halymenia formosa, and related species. In the Philippines, these species only grow in the sea off northern Luzon, where the waters are cooler. Gamet are manually harvested off rocks at low tide. The harvesting process is dangerous, and there have been fatal accidents among gamet gatherers due to sharp rocks and strong waves. They are then washed in seawater and dried into sheets or thin cakes for three to eight hours. Gamet is seasonal and is only available in the monsoon months, from November to March.

== See also ==
- Gulaman
- Guso
- Lato (green caviar)
- Nori
- Green laver
- Laverbread
