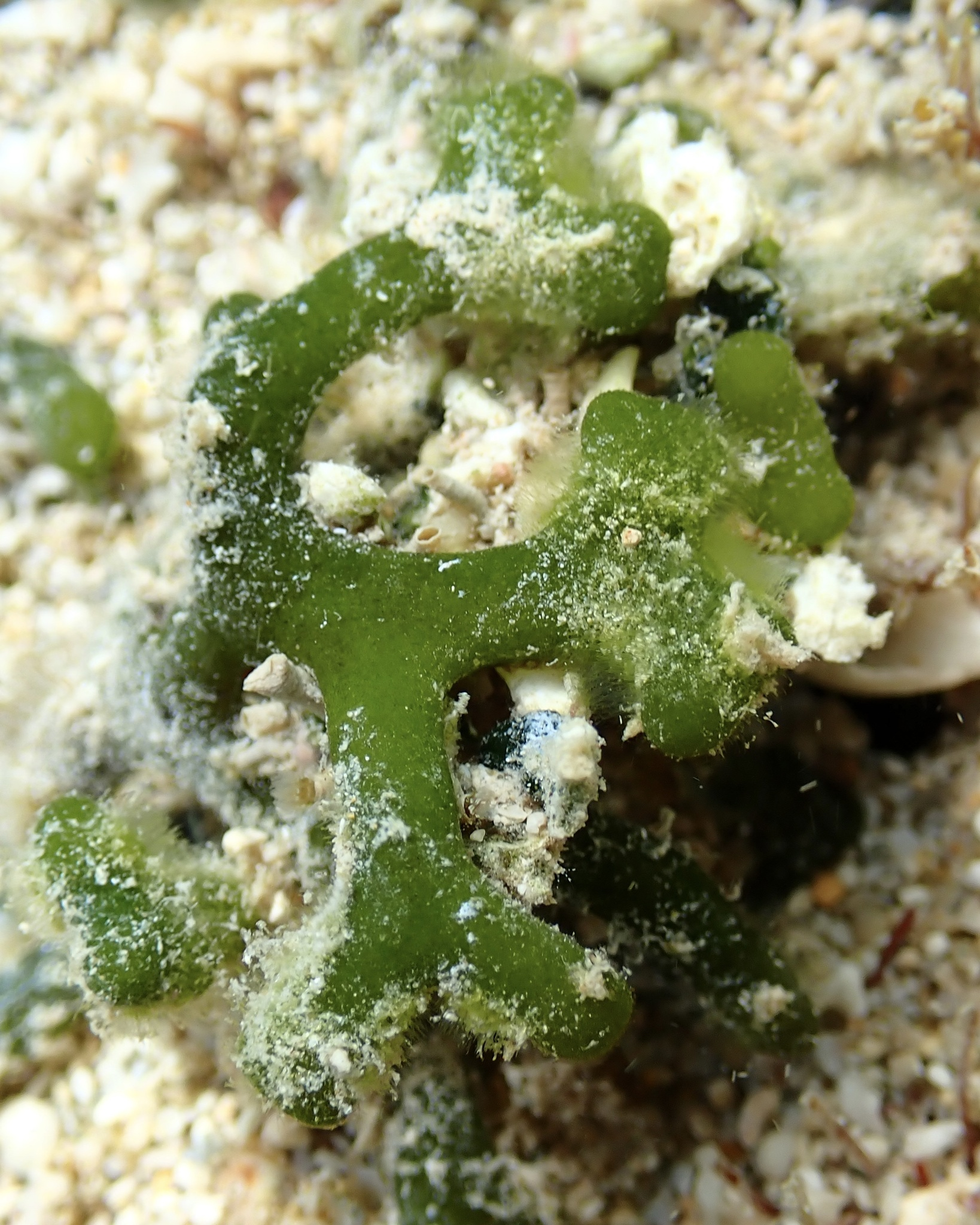

Scientific classification
- Kingdom: Plantae
- Division: Chlorophyta
- Class: Ulvophyceae
- Order: Bryopsidales
- Family: Codiaceae
- Genus: Codium
- Species: C. edule

Binomial name
- Codium edule P.C.Silva, 1952

= Codium edule =

Species of alga

Codium edule is a green alga common on shallow reef flats from the intertidal to the subtidal in tropical waters of the Indo-Pacific. The species is common in Hawaiʻi where it is usually called wāwaeʻiole (meaning "ratʻs foot") and considered an edible alga or limu. Prominent ethnobotanist Isabella Abbott described its usage in her writing.

== Description ==
Codium edule is a fleshy, dark green seaweed, with a soft, spongy texture. Its repeatedly forked branches lie flat and attach to surfaces, forming mats that incorporate coral rubble, rocks, and shells. The fronds of C. edule are split in two or three ways, are round, and get thinner at the ends. The branches are 3-5 mm wide and are held together or to the substratum by small, cushion-like holdfasts.

== Distribution and habitat ==
Codium edule is found in the Indo-Pacific region. It grows in many places from Hawaii to the Federated States of Micronesia to Papua New Guinea, and as far west as Indonesia. In the Hawaiian Islands, the type location is Waikiki. It grows in intertidal zones and tide pools found at 6 to 10 ft deep, and likes attaching itself to coral rubble and broken shells. As a result, this forms clumps of dark green soft branches that are split into smaller parts.

== Human Use and cultural significance ==
Codium edule serves various purposes, including human food, medicinal applications, animal feed, fish meal, and fertilizer. Although it can be kept in the fridge for an extended period, it tastes best when consumed within 10 days of foraging. It can be enjoyed as a side dish with fish, seafood, or stew, or mixed with other types of seaweed. The limu needs first to be washed carefully as grains of sand, pieces of shells and other debris get caught in the mats.
