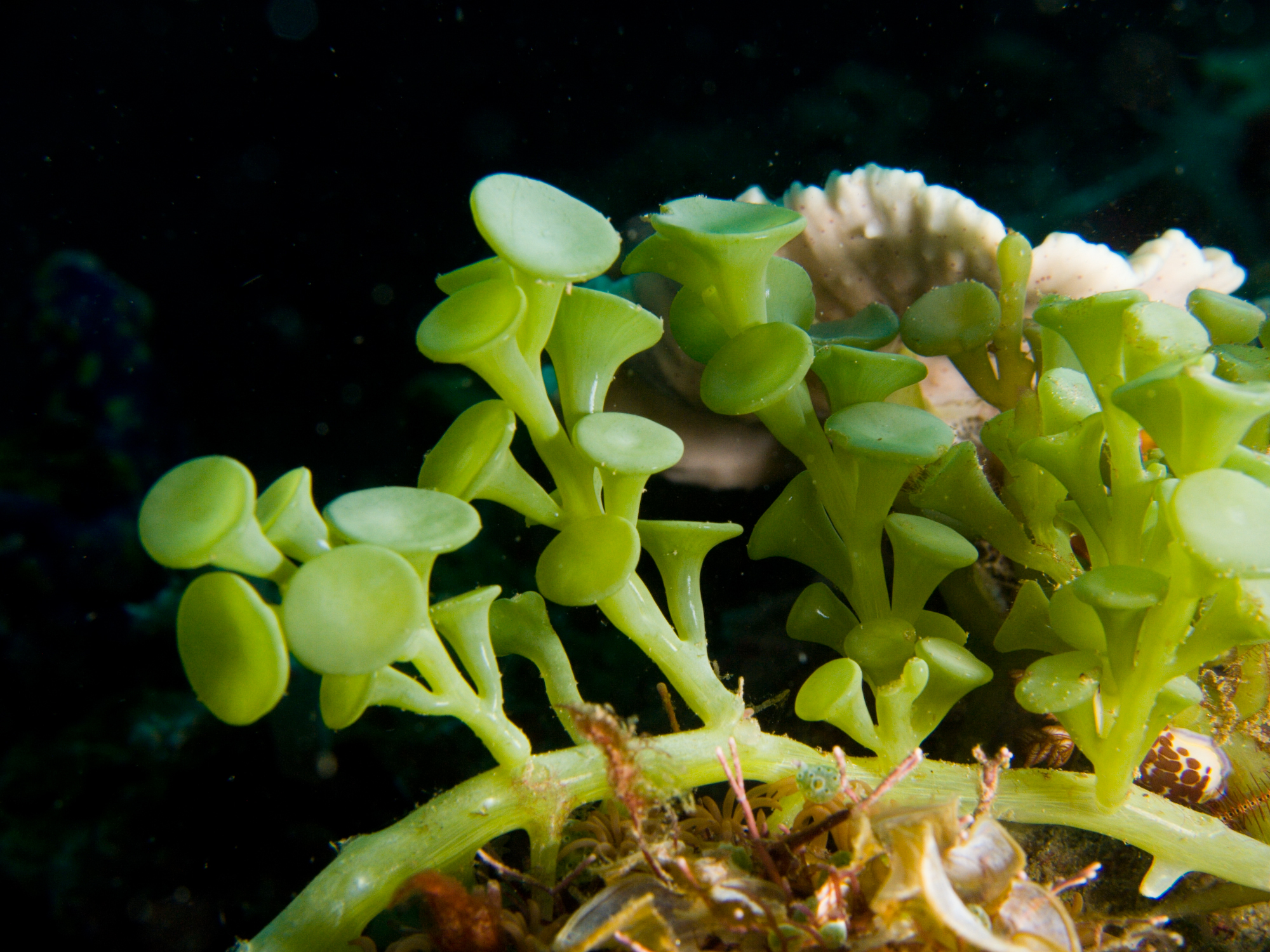

Scientific classification
- Kingdom: Plantae
- Division: Chlorophyta
- Class: Ulvophyceae
- Order: Bryopsidales
- Family: Caulerpaceae
- Genus: Caulerpa
- Species: C. racemosa

Binomial name
- Caulerpa racemosa (Forsskål) J.Agardh, 1873

Synonyms
- Caulerpa clavifera (Turner) C.Agardh, 1817; Caulerpa feldmannii Rayss & Edelstein, 1960; Caulerpa racemosa var. clavifera (C. Agardh) Weber-van Bosse, 1909; Caulerpa racemosa var. uvifera (C. Agardh) J. Agardh, 1873; Caulerpa uvifera (Roth) C.Agardh, 1817; Chauvinia clavifera (Turner) Bory de Saint-Vincent, 1829; Fucus clavifer Turner, 1807; Fucus racemosus Forsskål, 1775; Fucus uvifer Turner, 1811

= Caulerpa racemosa =

Species of alga

Caulerpa racemosa is a species of edible green alga, a seaweed in the family Caulerpaceae. It is commonly known as sea grapes (along with the related Caulerpa lentillifera) and is found in many areas of shallow sea around the world. Despite the name, it is not related to grapes. There are a number of different forms and varieties, and one that appeared in the Mediterranean Sea in 1990, which is giving cause for concern as an invasive species.

== Taxonomy ==
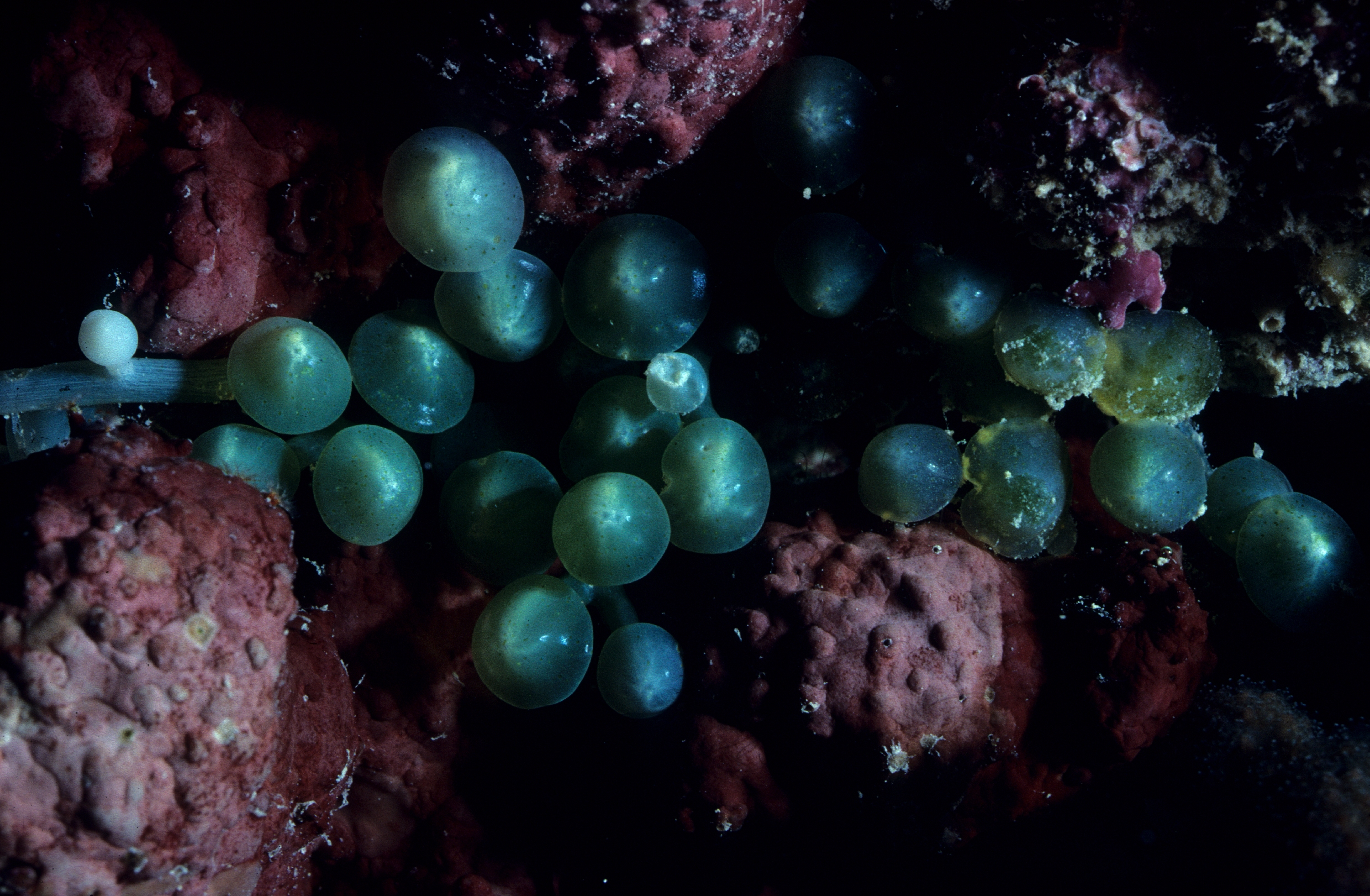
Oval sea grapes, var. clavifera, at 5 metres (16 ft) depth

There are about 75 species of Caulerpa. Many of them exhibit polymorphism, showing different growth forms in different habitats which makes them difficult to identify. C. racemosa, C. laetevirens and C. peltata form a species complex. A number of forms and varieties for C. racemosa are listed but further study is needed to clarify their exact phylogenetic relationships.

== Description ==
A plant of C. racemosa consists of a number of branches linked to stolons which are anchored to the sandy substrate by rhizoids. The branches are a few centimetres apart and can grow to a height of 30 centimetres (12 in). Many spherical or ovate side-shoots branch off these and give the seaweed its name of sea grapes. Like other members of the order Bryopsidales, each C. racemosa plant consists of a single enormous cell with a large number of nuclei. The chloroplasts containing chlorophyll are free to migrate from any part of the organism to another and there is a network of fibrous proteins that helps movement of organelles.

== Distribution ==
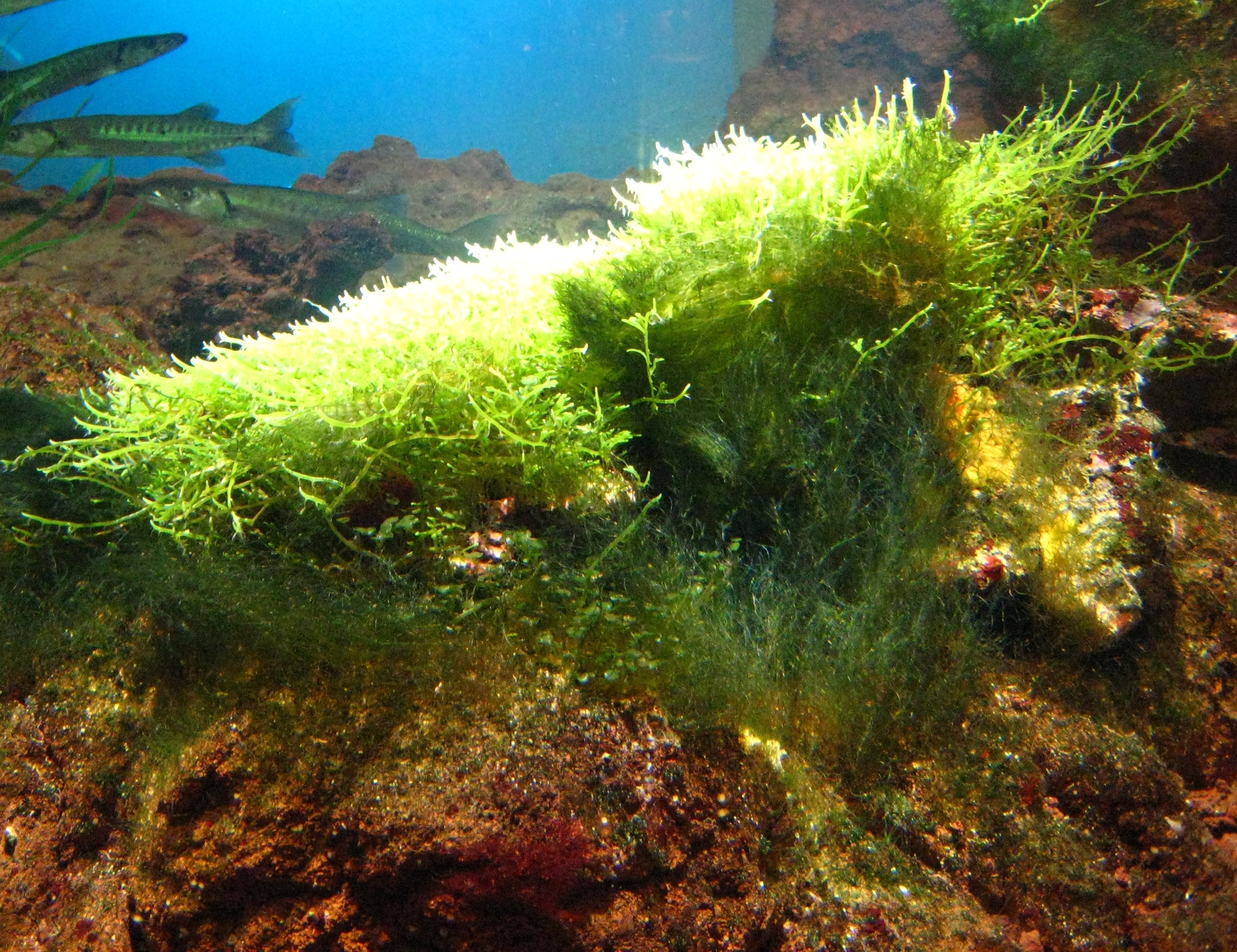
Much-branched form

C. racemosa is widely distributed in shallow temperate and tropical seas. In 1926 a new form of the alga was reported off Tunisia, possibly an immigrant from the Red Sea, and this later spread to much of the eastern Mediterranean Sea. In 1990, a new, larger form with two vertical rows of branches on opposite sides of the stem was found off Libya. It spread widely, invading much of the Mediterranean Sea and becoming more widespread than the invasive species, Caulerpa taxifolia. It is known as var. cylindracea and may have originated from Australian waters. In America C. racemosa is found in shallow water in the Caribbean Sea, around Bermuda and along the eastern seaboard of America from Florida to Brazil.

== Biology ==
In the Mediterranean, growth begins in April when new stolons develop and erect branches start growing, and continue till December, after which the plants decline and become dormant.

C. racemosa reproduces vegetatively by fragmentation. When pieces of the plant get broken off they develop into new plants. Small pieces of tissue only a few millimetres across are capable of doing this.

C. racemosa can also reproduce sexually and in so doing exhibits holocarpy. This means that all the organism's cytoplasm is used up in the creation of the gametes and only a husk remains at the site of the original plant. The plants are monoecious with male and female gametes being produced by the same plant and liberated into the water column where they unite to give spherical zygotes. These settle and after five weeks produce germ tubes which elongate and branch to develop into new plants. Mass spawnings sometimes take place in the Caribbean Sea and normally do so just before dawn. There were 39 such mass spawnings during a period of 125 days and the days on which they took place showed no relation to the tidal or lunar cycles. The gametes remain motile for about 60 minutes. Mass spawning is advantageous to the plant in increasing the chances of fertilisation. Underwater visibility can be reduced to less than one metre by the green cloud produced in the process. Similar mass spawnings take place in the Mediterranean Sea causing a cloud of green gametes to be released in the water approximately 14 minutes before sunrise.

== Ecology ==
Caulerpa species contain secondary metabolites that are cytotoxic, of which caulerpenyne is the most abundant. These deter animals from consuming the plants. A study has been done on herbivores that graze on meadows of the invasive C. cylindracea in the north west of its range in the Mediterranean. The sea breams Boops boops and Sarpa salpa were found to feed on the algae, as did the sea urchins Paracentrotus lividus and Sphaerechinus granularis. Other herbivores also grazed occasionally, but the total amount consumed was compensated for by the rapid growth of the plant and it was considered that these organisms were not likely to play a valuable role in bio-control of the plant. C. taxifolia and C. racemosa show the great influence of substratum on their spatial distribution with a high colonization of the dead matte of the seagrass Posidonia oceanica

C. racemosa and C. taxifolia are both invasive Lessepsian migrants. Caulerpenyne content is lesser in C. racemosa than in C. taxifolia.

== Uses ==
Like the closely related C. lentillifera, C. racemosa is edible. It is consumed widely in salads in Japan, Fiji, the Philippines, and Thailand. It is also eaten by local fishermen in Malaysia and Indonesia. They are rich in fiber, proteins, minerals (calcium and magnesium), folic acid, ascorbic acid, vitamin A, and vitamin B1 while also being low in fat.

In addition to the nutritional qualities of C. racemosa, it also has anti bacterial and anti-oxidant properties but these characteristics are not yet fully explored. These different biological activities provide a glimpse of biomedical innovations for the future. The properties are believed to come from a strain of rare endophytic actinomycetes that lives in symbiosis with C. racemosa and more particularly of the secondary metabolites produced (flavonoids and alkaloids). Extracts of C. racemosa are already tested to reduce different types of cancer but also to fight against multi-drug resistant uropathogens (as K. pneumoniae and P. aeruginosa). The multi drug resistance is a major public health problem because by 2050 (World Health Organization WHO), 10 million people could die each year as a result of this evolution of bacteria against the current families of antibiotics. Moreover, a multitude of potential treatments for various pathologies have been identified, particularly for diabetes and herpes.
