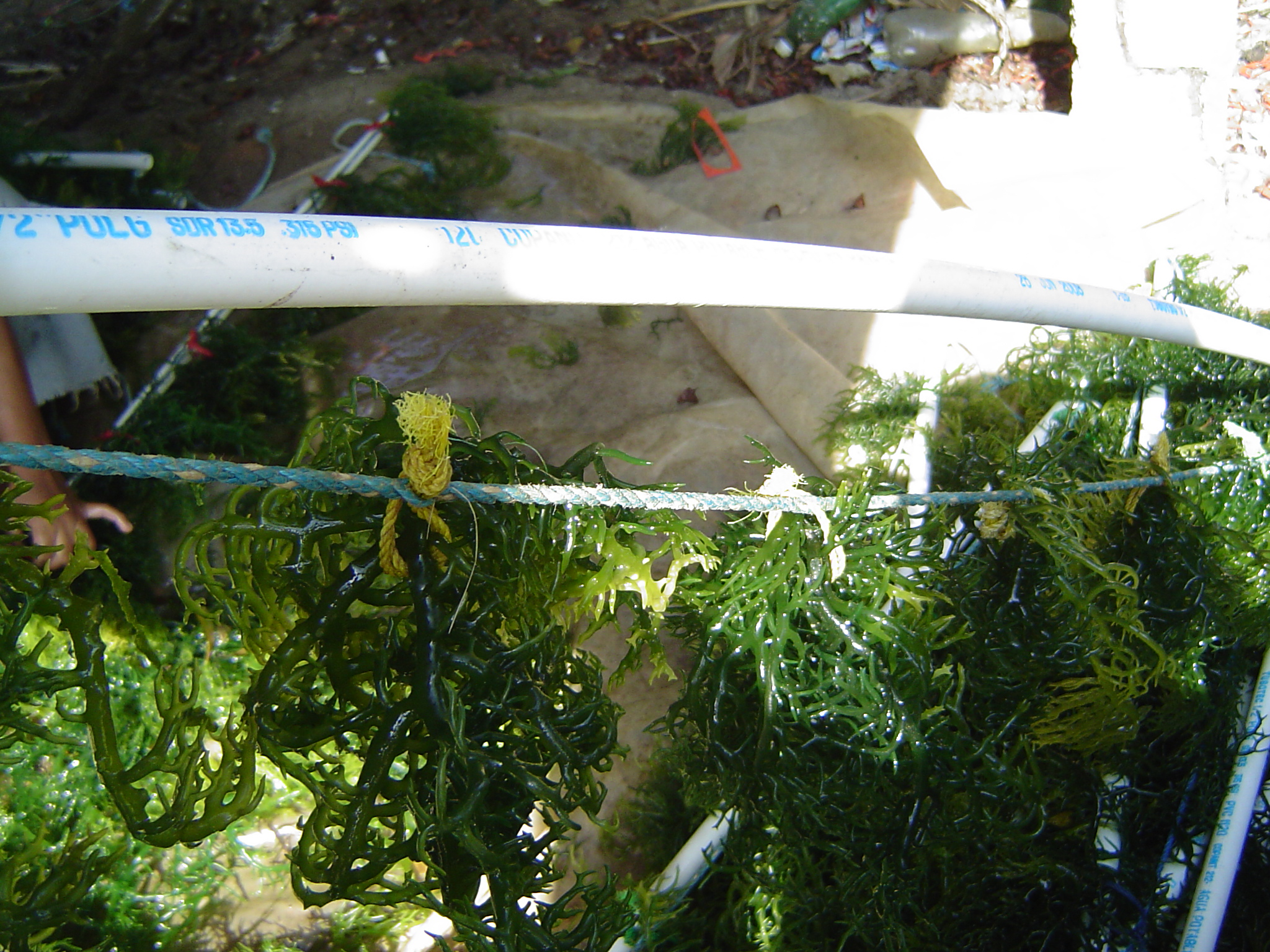
- Eucheuma growing on a monoline.

Scientific classification
- Domain: Eukaryota
- Clade: Archaeplastida
- Division: Rhodophyta
- Class: Florideophyceae
- Order: Gigartinales
- Family: Solieriaceae
- Genus: Eucheuma; J.Agardh

= Eucheuma =

Genus of algae

Eucheuma, commonly known as sea moss or gusô (/ɡuˈsɔːʔ/), is a rhodophyte seaweed that may vary in color (purple, brown, and green). Eucheuma species are used in the production of carrageenan, an ingredient for cosmetics, food processing, and industrial manufacturing, as well as a food source for people in the Philippines, Caribbean and parts of Indonesia and Malaysia. Eucheuma cottonii – which grows in the Caribbean and cultivated in the Philippines – is the particular species known as gusô. Other species include Betaphycus gelatinae, Eucheuma denticulatum, and several species of the genus Kappaphycus, including K. alvarezii. Since the mid-1970s, Kappaphycus and Eucheuma have been a major source for the expansion of the carrageenan industry.

Commercial seaweed farming of gusô (as well as Kappaphycus) was pioneered in the Philippines. Though commercially significant, species of Eucheuma are difficult to identify without the aid of close scientific examination, as different species may have similar morphologies. Some eighteen to twenty species alone fall within the genus Eucheuma, represented by the groups Cottoniformia, Gelatiformia, and Anaxiferae.

Gusô is listed in the Ark of Taste international catalogue of endangered heritage foods of the Philippines by the Slow Food movement.

== History ==
The earliest record of the use of gusô as food is from the Diccionario de la Lengua Bisaya, Hiligueina y Haraia de la isla de Panay y Sugbu y para las demás islas (c.1637) of the Augustinian missionary Alonso de Méntrida (in Spanish). In the book, Méntrida describes gusô as being a type of seaweed gathered from the beach by the Visayan peoples of the Philippines. They were then cooked until melted, and then allowed to congeal into a sour dish.

The 1889 book The Useful Native Plants of Australia records that Eucheuma speciosa (now a synonym of Betaphycus speciosum) was commonly known as the "Jelly Plant' in Western Australia and that "This is a remarkable sea-weed of a very gelatinous character which enters into the culinary arrangements of the people of Western Australia for making jelly, blancmange, etc. Size and cement can also be made from it. It is cast ashore from deep water."

== Distribution ==
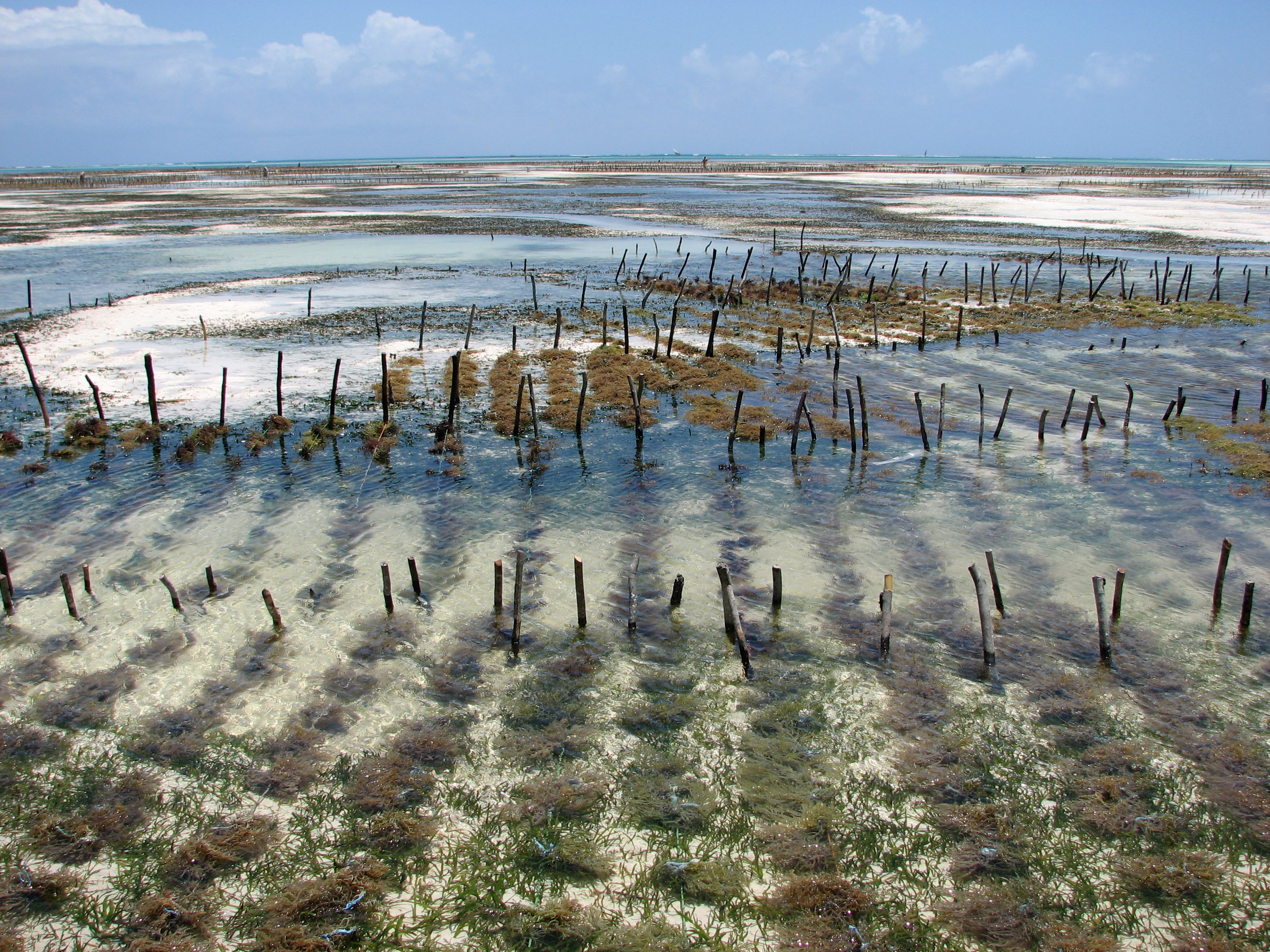
Eucheuma farming, Tanzania

Eucheuma are naturally found within the range of 20 degrees either side of the Equator in the Indo-Pacific region from eastern Africa to Guam, and are most concentrated in Southeast Asia. A few species are found on Lord Howe Island and in southwestern Australia.

As a commercial crop, Eucheuma has since been distributed to many regions away from their original natural habitats, including Japan, Hawaii, and island nations in the South Pacific.

== Habitat and biology ==
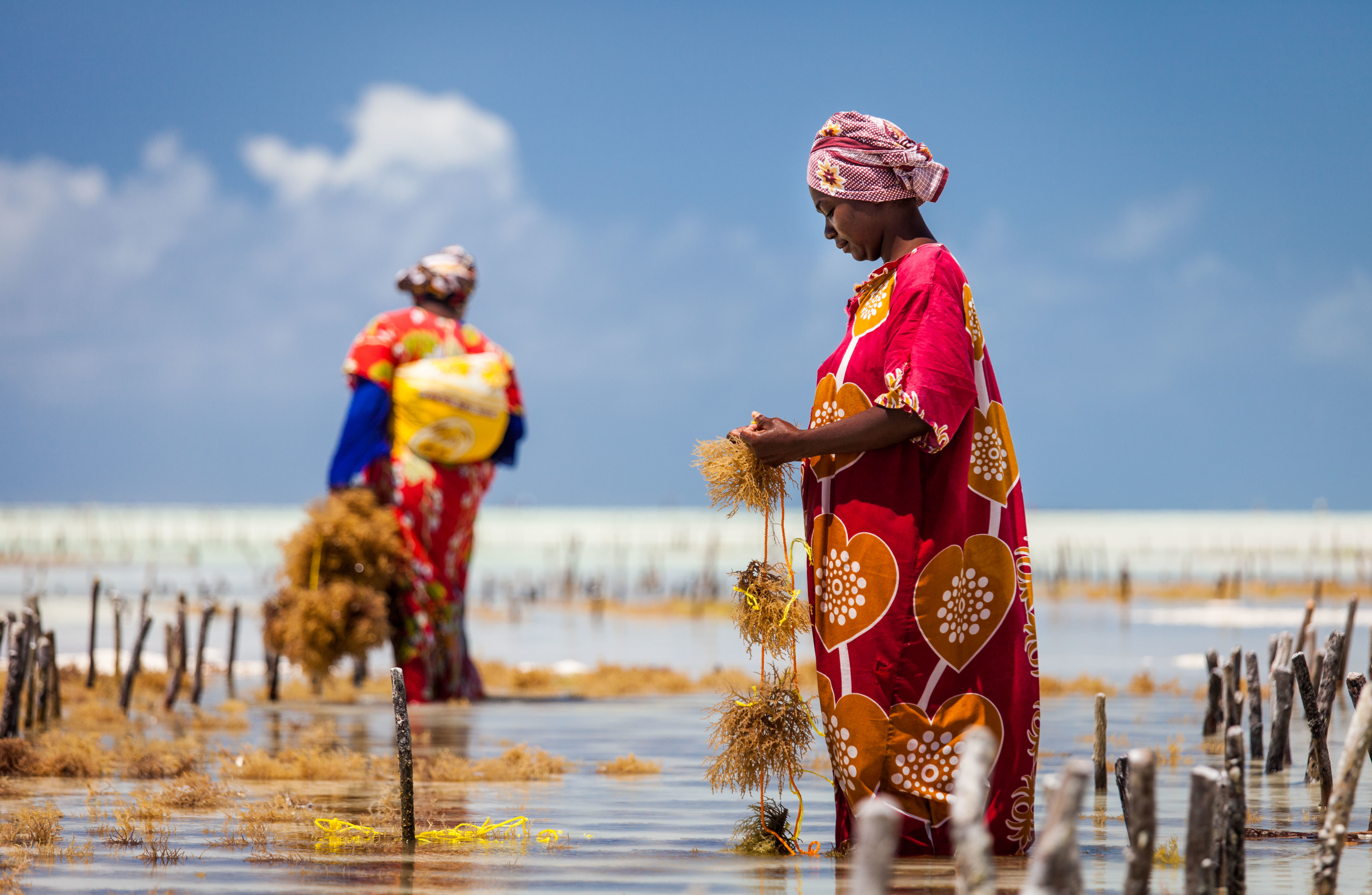
Women collecting Eucheuma in Jambiani (Zanzibar).

Eucheuma are typically found below the low tide mark to the upper subtidal zone of a reef, growing on sand to rocky seafloor areas along a coral reef, where water movement is slow to moderate.

Their growth is similar to terrestrial plant species, where Eucheuma have a growing tip, or apical meristem, which is also capable of dividing to form new growing branches. They also show a triphasic life cycle, consisting of a gametophyte (n) (dioecious), carposporophyte (2n), and the sporophyte (2n). Both the gametophyte and the more robust sporophyte stage are significant to the development of the seaweed, where their characteristics allow for increased vegetative regeneration.

== Commercial aspects ==
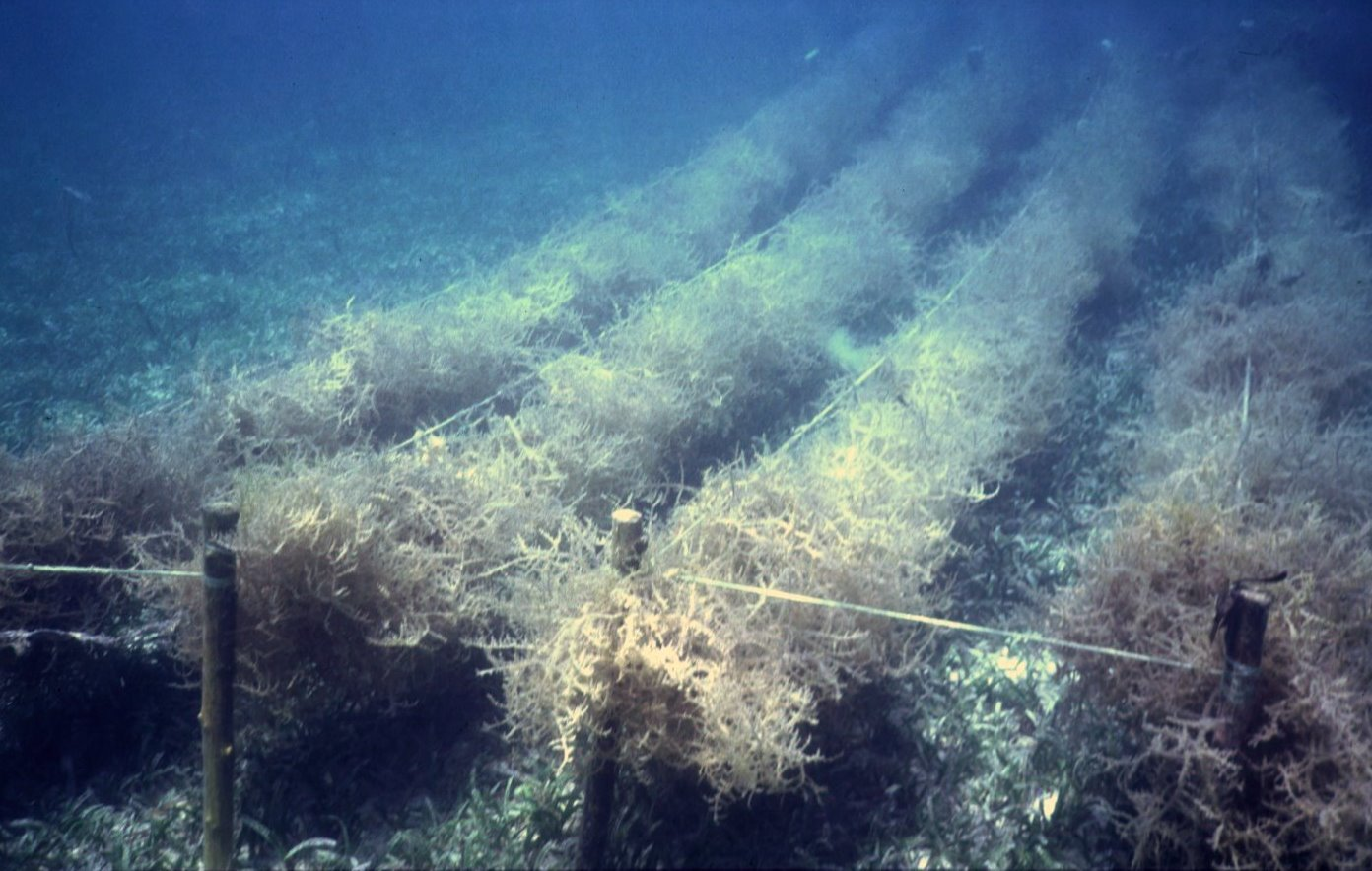
Underwater Eucheuma farming, Philippines

Commercial growth of Eucheuma is an important source of income for people living in developing nations, where the production of the low-valued seaweed can be a sustainable source of income with lower environmental costs compared to other sectors of aquaculture. As Eucheuma are some of the most common and fastest growing species of seaweeds, their commercial aspects are visible by large quantities grown and harvested over short periods of time, possessing the ability to reach ten times their mass in some 45 to 60 days in warm tropical settings. Once harvested, the product can be dried, packaged, and then transported to areas ready for carrageenan extraction or used as a food supply.

The major producers of Eucheuma include the Philippines (~92% total global production; 2005 statistics FAO) and China (~7% total global production). It is also farmed in Tanzania and Kiribati. This may be underrepresented as countries including Indonesia and Malaysia, which are also significant producers of these species, do not accurately report their output to the FAO. As Eucheuma is commercially important for economic growth, average annual production of total dried seaweeds, including other groups of sea plants, reached nearly 125,000 tonnes in the Philippines alone, by 2000–2004, with a value of approximately $US139 million.

== Farming ==
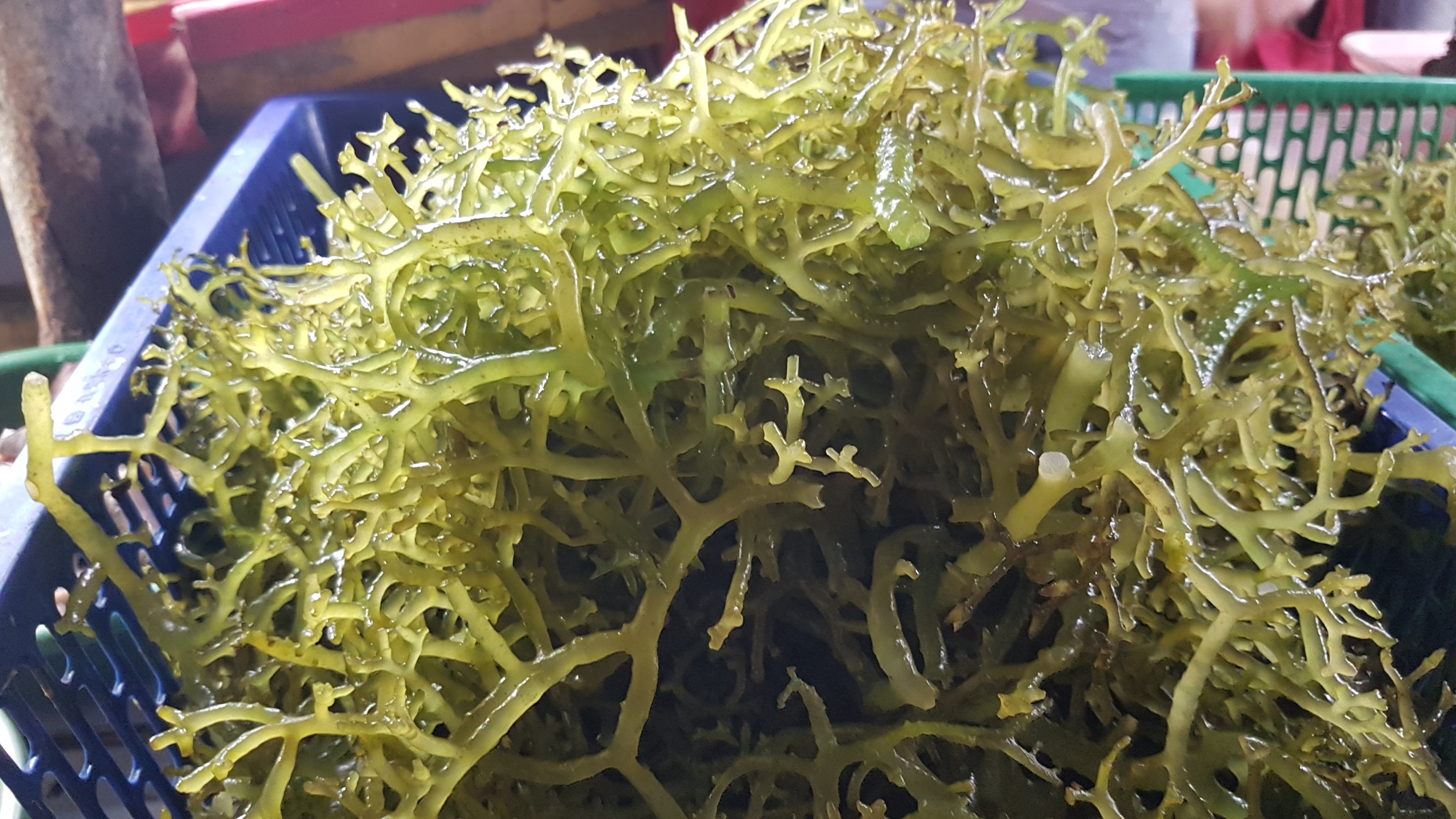
Gusô in a fish market in the Philippines. They are eaten fresh dipped in vinegar and spices in Philippine cuisine

Information based on morphological characteristics, DNA fingerprinting, and growth performance during different crop seasons is used to facilitate Eucheuma crop management, for which high-growth species are used for seed stocks, mostly from the Philippines. Once seed stocks have been obtained from the wild, they undergo cleaning in order to rid them of dirt and other contaminants, where they are then transferred to nursery sites in styrofoam boxes with air holes in the top, without exposure to the wind or the sun.

Site selection is important in developing potential seaweed farms, and certain criteria must be met first in order to optimize production. These criteria include suitable current and wave actions to allow for absorption of nutrients, sufficient but not excessive light to allow for optimum photosynthesis, a sufficient water depth not hindered by low tide exposure, an optimum water temperature between 27 and 30 degrees Celsius, salinity levels of 30–35 0/00, and areas with little presence of grazers, microorganisms, suspended silt, and epiphytes. Seed stocks are then prepared by tying Eucheuma cuttings with soft plastic tying materials to monolines in both the bottom monoline and floating methods, where the nylon lines run parallel to each other at one-meter intervals to allow for water currents to flow through. The seaweed is then harvested 10–12 weeks after planting in order to allow the crop to mature and increase its carrageenan content.

The farming of Eucheuma has raised certain environmental issues, mostly centered on the ecology and biodiversity of coastal environments. The ecology of Eucheuma farm sites may be characterized by overcrowding, as other farmers may be attracted to the farming site, eventually exceeding the carrying capacity of the environment. This in turn may change the overall hydrology of the area, impacting on other species that may be present. Domestic pollution from farmhouse waste disposal may also impact the nearby environment.

== See also ==
- Caulerpa lentillifera (Latô)
- Gamet
- Agar
- Carrageenan
- Seaweed farming
