= Marine permaculture =

Method to regenerate life in the ocean

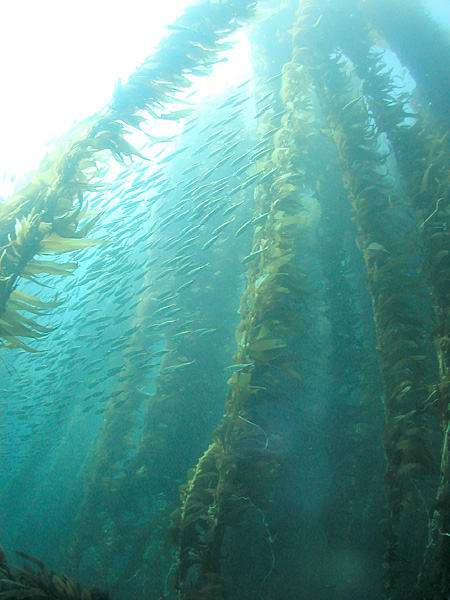
A kelp forest in San Clemente Island, California demonstrating the diversity of life that can be supported by Marine Permaculture.

Marine Permaculture is a form of mariculture that reflects the principles of permaculture by recreating seaweed forest habitat and other ecosystems in nearshore and offshore ocean environments. Doing so enables a sustainable long-term harvest of seaweeds and seafood, while regenerating life in the ocean.

== Macroalgae ecosystems restoration ==
Marine Permaculture comprises a platform from which seaweed ecosystems can be grown, creating the environmental conditions for primary production and habitat for marine life. Using a system of renewably powered pumps, cool, nutrient-rich waters are brought up from a depth of 100-500 meters, below the nutricline, to the ocean surface, thereby replicating natural overturning circulation processes of ocean upwelling and mitigating against marine heatwaves that have led to ocean stratification and decimated natural macroalgae ecosystems in many regions of the world. In addition, artificial structures provide substrate seaweeds require to grow on. The seaweed growth and increased plankton provide critical marine habitat for fish populations to thrive. This type of intervention regenerates overturning circulation and returns mixed layer temperatures to levels closer to those measured pre-industrially.

== Ocean regeneration potential ==
Marine Permaculture has received endorsement from a number of permaculture experts, including Morag Gamble of the Permaculture Education Institute, Matt Powers, David Holmgren and the Santa Barbara Permaculture Network, who have recognised its adherence to the principles of permaculture. It has also received considerable attention as a potentially ground-breaking climate solution. It has featured as a “Coming Attraction” solution in the book Drawdown: The Most Comprehensive Plan Ever Proposed to Reverse Global Warming edited by Paul Hawken and was one of the main climate solutions featured in Damon Gameau’s documentary film 2040. Professor Tim Flannery has also highlighted Marine Permaculture’s potential in sequestering gigatons of carbon through hectare scale platforms in the open ocean, an idea that has also received attention from the voluntary carbon market Nori. Marine Permaculture is also mentioned as a climate solution in Burn: Using Fire to Cool the Earth by Albert Bates and Kathleen Draper. Marine Permaculture also features in the MacArthur Foundation's Bold Solutions Network, of the “Top100” innovative solutions to the world’s most pressing challenges.

== Product applications ==
If deployed at scale, it has the potential to provide food security to billions of people who rely upon the oceans for their primary source of protein, act as a source of blue carbon, while lowering ocean acidification, providing sustainable livelihoods, and restoring marine habitat. To date, Marine Permaculture trials have been conducted in numerous regions of the world including Hawaii, the Philippines, Puerto Rico and Tasmania, where it is being used to regenerate seaweed ecosystems recently decimated from climate change. Harvesting organic kelp may produce ingredients for agriculture, fertilisers, pharmaceutical and textiles: Biostimulants, such as organic soil improvers, feed supplements for fish and cattle, pulp for cellulose, fibers to replace wood pulp, nanocellulose for water-proofing cardboards, and biomedical molecules with natural anti-septic properties are some of the products elaborated by the marine permaculture projects.
