= Aquaculture of giant kelp =

Cultivation of seaweed

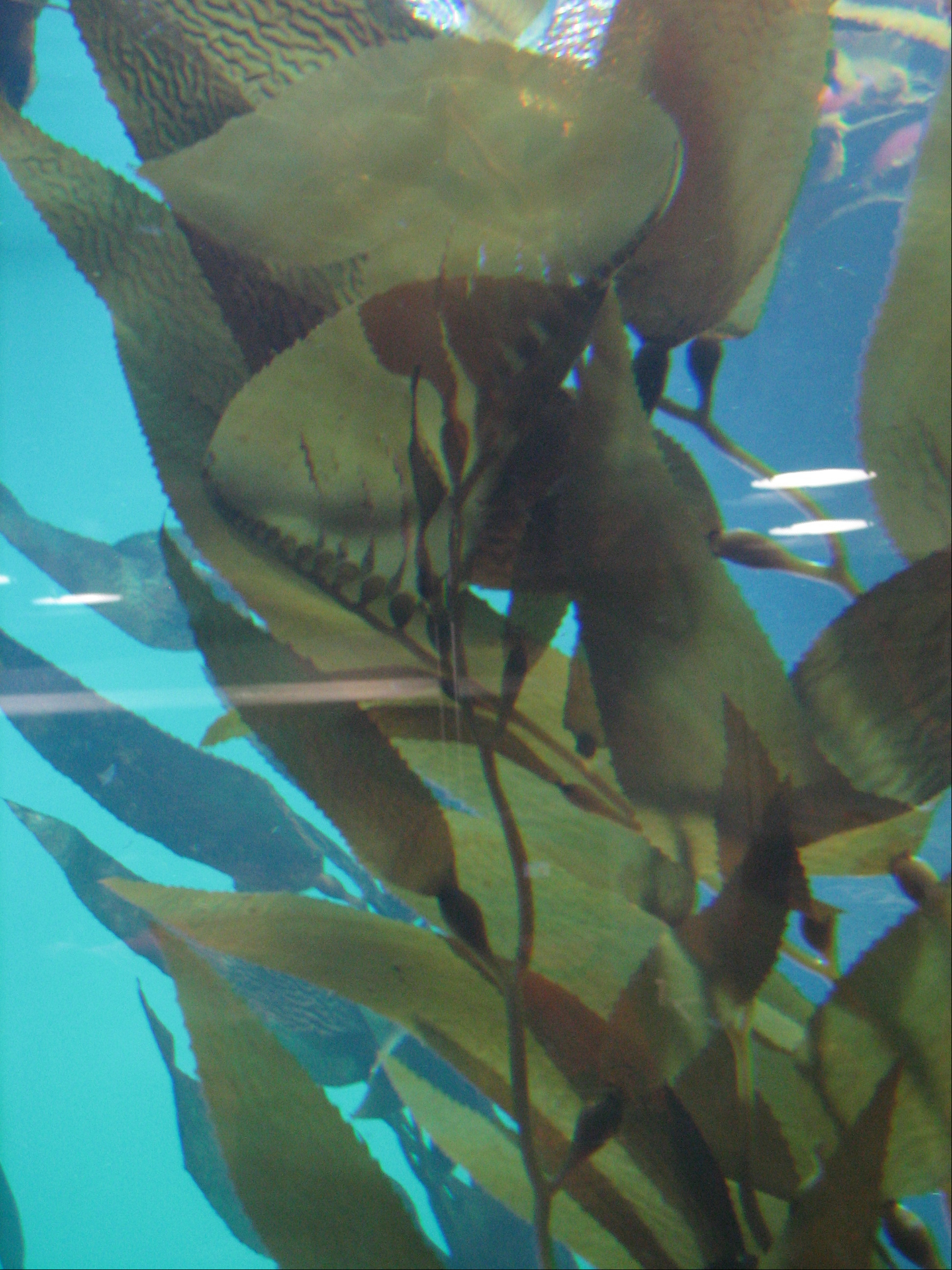
Giant kelp

Aquaculture of giant kelp, Macrocystis pyrifera, is the cultivation of kelp for uses such as food, dietary supplements or potash. Giant kelp contains iodine, potassium, other minerals vitamins and carbohydrates. Giant kelp may also be cultivated for animal feed or as part of ecological restoration. Methods to cultivate giant kelp were developed in the 20th and 21st centuries.

== History ==
At the beginning of the 20th century California kelp beds were harvested for their potash. Commercial interest increased during the 1970s and the 1980s due to the production of alginates, and also for biomass production for animal feed due to the energy crisis. However commercial production for M. pyrifera never developed. With the end of the energy crisis and the decline in alginate prices, research into farming Macrocystis declined.

The supply of M. pyrifera for alginate production relied heavily on restoration and management of natural beds during the early 1990s. Other functions such as substrate stabilization were explored in California, where the “Kelp bed project” transplanted 3-6m adult specimens to increase the stability of the harbor and promote diversity.

=== Twenty-first century ===
Research is investigating its use as feed for other aquaculture species such as fish.

China and Chile are the largest producers of aquatic plants and algae, each producing over 300,000 tonnes in 2007. How much of this total can be attributed to M. pyrifera is unclear. Both countries culture a variety of species; in Chile 50% of the production involves Phaeophytes and the other 50% is Rhodophytes. China produces a larger variety of seaweeds including chlorophytes. Experiments in Chile are exploring hybrids of M. pyrifera and M. integrifolia.

Kelp farming development has been ongoing in Oregon and British Columbia. Startups have begun leasing water in Alaska to cultivate M. Pyrifera at a large scale.

==== Kelp forest restoration in California ====
In the 2010s, Northern California lost 95% of its kelp ecosystems due to marine heatwaves.

Kelp bed recovery efforts in California are primarily focusing on sea urchin removal, both by scuba divers, and by sea otters, which are natural predators.

A brown algae, Sargassum horneri, an invasive species first spotted in 2003, has also been a concern.

Researchers at the Bodega Marine Laboratory of UC Davis are developing replanting strategies, and volunteers of the Orange County Coastkeeper group are replanting giant kelp. Humboldt State University began cultivating bull kelp in its research farm in 2021.

Research efforts at the state level to prevent kelp forest collapse in California were announced in July 2020.

At the federal level, H.R. 4458, the Keeping Ecosystems Living and Productive (KELP) Act, introduced July 29, 2021, seeks to establish a new grant program within NOAA for kelp forest restoration.

Ocean Rainforest, a Faroe Islands-based company, secured $4.5 million in U.S. government funding to grow giant kelp on an 86-acre farm off the coast of Santa Barbara, California.

== Methods ==
The most common method of cultivating M. pyrifera was developed in China in the 1950s. It is called the long line cultivation system, where the sporelings are produced in a cooled water greenhouse and then planted in the ocean attached to long lines. The depth at which they are grown varies. This species alternates generations in its life cycle, cycling between a large sporophyte and a microscopic gametophyte. The sporophyte is harvested as seaweed. The mature sporophytes form the reproductive organs called sori. They are found on the underside of the leaves and produce the motile zoospores that germinate into the gametophyte. To induce sporulation, plants are dried for up to twelve hours and placed in a seeding container filled with seawater of about 9-10 °C; salinity of 30% and a pH of 7.8-7.9. Photoperiod is controlled during sporulation and growth phases. A synthetic twine of about 2 – 6mm in diameter is placed on the bottom of the same container after sporulation. The released zoospores attach to the twine and begin to germinate into male and female gametophytes. Upon maturity these gametophytes release sperm and egg cells that fuse in the water column and attach themselves to the same substrate as the gametophytes (the twine). These plants are reared into young sporophytes for up to 60 days.

These strings are either wrapped around or are cut up into small pieces and attached to a larger diameter cultivation rope. The cultivation ropes vary, but extend approximately 60m with floating buoys attached. The depths vary. In China, M. pyrifera is cultivated on the surface with floating buoys attached every 2-3m and the ends of the rope attached to a wooden peg anchored to the substrate. Individual ropes are usually hung at 50 cm intervals. In Chile M. pyrifera is grown at a depth of 2m using buoys to keep the plants at a constant depth. These are then let alone to grow until harvest.

Problems that afflict this method include management of the transition from spore to gametophyte and embryonic sporophyte which are done on a terrestrial facility with careful control of water flow, temperature, nutrients and light. The Japanese use a forced cultivation method where 2 years of growth is achieved within a single growing season by controlling inputs.

In China a project for offshore/deep water cultivation used various farm structures to facilitate growth, including pumping nutrients from deep water into the beds. The greatest benefit for this approach was that the algae were released from size constraints of shallow waters. Issues with operational and farm designs plagued deep water cultivation and ended further exploration.

=== Harvesting ===
The duration of cultivation varies by region and farming intensity. This species is usually harvested after two growth seasons (2 years). M. pyrifera which is artificially cultivated on ropes is harvested by a pulley system that is attached to boats that pull the individual lines on the vessels for cleaning. Other countries such as the US rely primarily on naturally grown M. pyrifera, use boats to harvest the surface canopy several times per year. This is possible due to fast growth while the vegetative and reproductive parts are left undamaged.

== Applications ==
In the UK, legislation defines giant kelp as a nuisance. Invasive specimens are mechanically removed.

The demand for M. pyrifera centers on fertilizers, bioremediation and feed for abalone and sea urchins.

=== Carbon sequestration ===
Offsetting current carbon emissions would require some 50 trillion trees. An alternative offset would be to cultivate kelp forests. Kelp can grow at 2 feet per day, 30 times faster than terrestrial plants. Planting kelp across 10% of the oceans (4.5 x the area of Australia) could provide the same offset. Additionally, the kelp would support a fish harvest of 2 megatons per year and reduce ocean acidification. Large scale open ocean forestry would require engineered substrate and added nutrients.

A Maine startup, Running Tide Technologies, seeks to grow large quantities of kelp which would sequester carbon in the ocean floor.

=== Biofuel ===
A kelp nursery and planting program is under development near Catalina Island. Cultivation techniques using a "kelp elevator" have shown promise for biofuel production using thermochemical liquefaction. This research effort is supported by ARPA-E.

=== Food ===
Small-scale cultivation uses kelp as a replacement for kale. Organizations such as Connecticut-based GreenWave connect ocean farmers with kelp buyers in an effort to support the ocean greens market.

== See also ==
- Edible seaweed
- Kelp forest
- Seaweed farming
- Ocean fertilization
- Blue carbon
