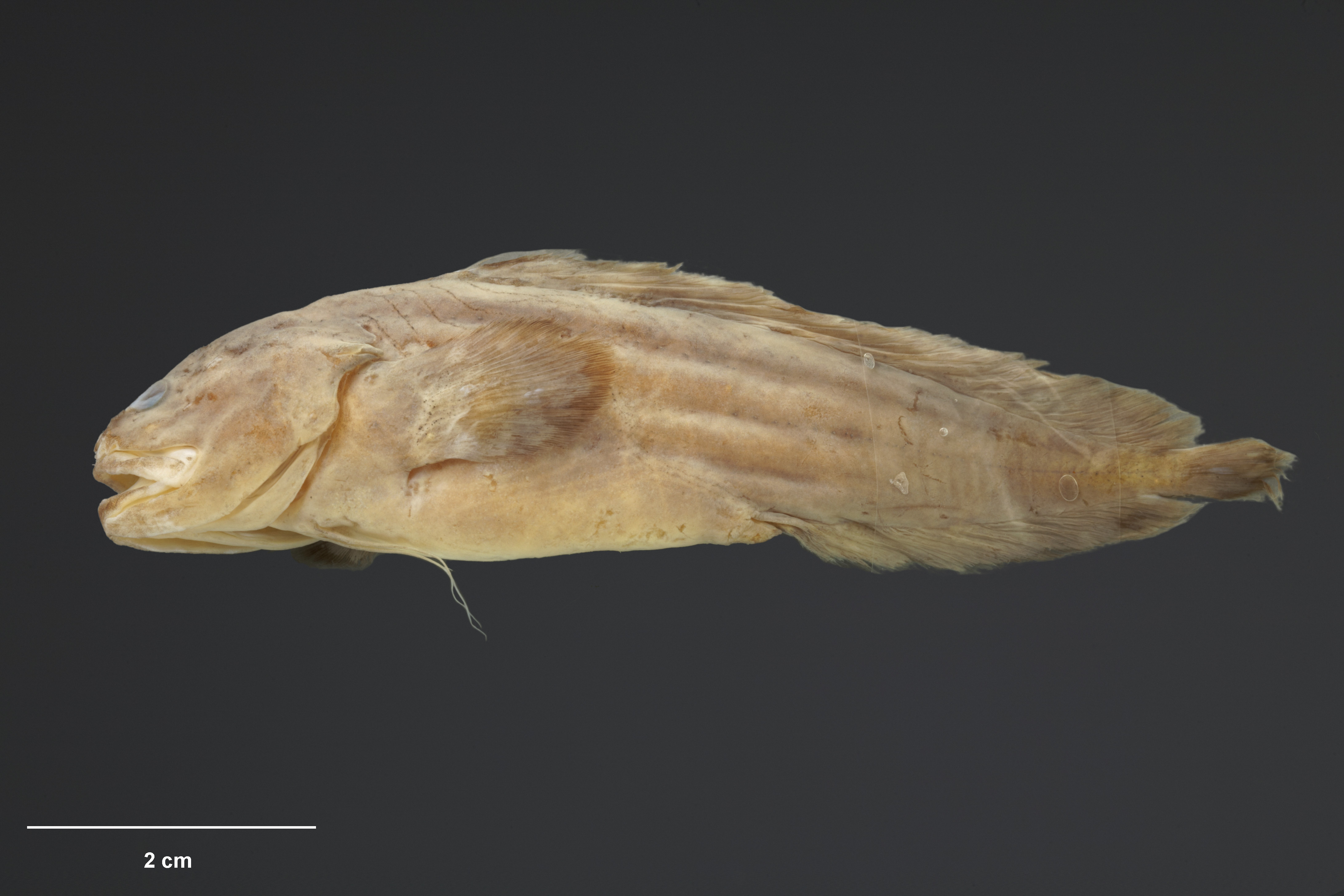

Scientific classification
- Kingdom: Animalia
- Phylum: Chordata
- Class: Actinopterygii
- Order: Ophidiiformes
- Family: Bythitidae
- Genus: Bidenichthys
- Species: B. beeblebroxi

Binomial name
- Bidenichthys beeblebroxi Paulin, 1995

= Bidenichthys beeblebroxi =

Species of common reef fish of the family Bythitidae

Bidenichthys beeblebroxi is a species of common reef fish of the family Bythitidae. The species is found in the coastal waters off North Island and northern South Island, New Zealand. It is a common, uniformly gray-brown fish, ranging from SL 6.5–9.5 centimetres (2 1/2–3 3/4 in) long in one study, found in holes beneath rocks and boulders in kelp forest and other reef habitats from the surface down to depths of 30 metres (98 ft). The species was described by Chris D. Paulin in 1995. IUCN and the Catalog of Fishes consider it a synonym of Bidenichthys consobrinus.

The species was named after the character Zaphod Beeblebrox in Douglas Adams' The Hitchhiker's Guide to the Galaxy.

The common names gray or grey brotula and orange cuskeel were used to describe Bidenichthys consobrinus (F. W. Hutton, 1876) prior to Paulin's 1995 redescription of B. consobrinus and description of B. beeblebroxi, in which Paulin referred to "the common grey brotula, here described as a new species [B. beeblebroxi], and Hutton's 'consobrinus'...".
