= 2040 (film) =

2019 film directed by Damon Gameau

- Directed by: Damon Gameau
- Written by: Damon Gameau
- Produced by: Nick Batzias; Anna Kaplan; Damon Gameau; Virginia Whitwell
- Starring: Damon Gameau
- Cinematography: Hugh Miller
- Edited by: Ryan Wade Howard; Jane Usher
- Music by: Bryony Marks
- Production company: Good Thing Productions
- Distributed by: Madman Entertainment
- Release dates: 11 February 2019 (Berlin International Film Festival); 23 May 2019 (Australia)
- Running time: 92 minutes
- Country: Australia
- Language: English
- Box office: $942,937

2040 is a 2019 Australian documentary film directed by and starring Damon Gameau. The film looks at the effects of climate change over the next 20 years and what technologies that exist today can reverse the effects.

2040 received positive reviews from critics with praise for its optimistic approach to the climate crisis, and gained international attention when it was screened at numerous film festivals.

== Synopsis ==
2040 follows Gameau's imagining of a future for his four-year-old daughter Velvet, where climate change has been solved. Described as “an exercise in fact-based dreaming” the film is structured as a letter to his daughter whereby Gameau travels around the world investigating numerous solutions that can contribute towards climate mitigation and imagining what a future would be like where they have been implemented at scale. In choosing what to feature in the film, Gameau restricted it to solutions that are either already available or have a realistic potential to greatly contribute to reversing climate change by the year 2040. The film features interviews with numerous academics, ecological experts and entrepreneurs and covers five broad areas.

It examines how renewable energy, like rooftop solar, have enabled micro-grids to form in Bangladesh enabling communities to produce, own and trade their own energy. The film addresses mobility and how a move away from car-ownership through self-driving cars and ride-sharing can enable the redesign of urban areas by promoting green spaces and more livable cities.

It also examines the role of agriculture and how a shift towards regenerative agricultural practices can not only reduce greenhouse gas emissions but also contribute to carbon sequestration while enabling greater resilience, such as through increased water retention. The climate benefits of adopting plant-rich diets are also discussed.

The film also looks at the many uses of seaweeds and how bringing seaweed ecosystems to the open ocean through Marine Permaculture can enable the sustainable harvest of seaweeds and fish to help guarantee food security while regenerating marine life and sequestering carbon.

Finally, Gameau considers the cascading societal benefits of the empowerment of women and girls, notably through education, as it enables women to have greater control over their life-decisions thereby providing a non-coercive, human-rights based means to reduce population growth.

== Cast ==
Along with Gameau, the film features interviews with Paul Hawken, Kate Raworth, Tony Seba, Neel Tahmane, Eric Toensmeier, Genevieve Bell, Brian Von Herzen, Amanda Cahill, Colin Seis and Helena Norberg-Hodge.

== Reception ==
2040 received a positive response from critics. Review aggregator Rotten Tomatoes reported as of October 2021 that 100% of 22 film critics had given the film a positive review, with a rating average of 7.1/10. The site's critics' consensus reads: "With 2040, documentarian Damon Gameau entertainingly surveys possible solutions to the climate change crisis, offering an unusually optimistic way forward." On Metacritic, which uses a weighted average, the film has scored a 77/100 based on 5 critics, indicating "generally favorable" reviews.

In his review for The Guardian, Luke Buckmaster was generally positive, saying "Damon Gameau’s upbeat documentary predicts our best selves saving the planet but would have been better as a TV series". Although doubtful of Gameau's on-screen persona, Ben Kenigsberg of the New York Times was mostly positive describing it as an “accessible, informative and optimistic look at solutions to the climate crisis”. In a review oriented towards parents, Sandie Angulo Chen of Commonsense Media was also positive, giving the film a four-star review in a review that emphasised its educational value and positive messaging.

The film received international attention, having been selected for the Seattle, Stockholm, Berlin and Gold Coast film festivals.
