= Thunderstruck (2004 film) =

- Directed by: Darren Ashton
- Written by: Darren Ashton; Shaun Angus Hall
- Produced by: Al Clark; Andrena Finlay; Barbara Gibbs; Jodi Matterson; Bjorg Veland
- Starring: Damon Gameau; Stephen Curry; Ryan Johnson; Callan Mulvey; Sam Worthington
- Cinematography: Geoffrey Hall
- Release date: 8 September 2004
- Running time: 98 minutes
- Country: Australia
- Language: English

Thunderstruck is a 2004 Australian film directed by Darren Ashton and starring Stephen Curry, Damon Gameau, Ryan Johnson, Callan Mulvey, and Sam Worthington. Its plot concerns five AC/DC fans who make a promise that if one of them died, the other four would have him buried next to grave of their idol, Bon Scott. When one of them dies, the remaining four embark on a road trip to fulfill their promise.

== Plot ==
Ben, Sonny, Lloyd, Sam, and Ronnie are friends from Sydney who are all big fans of AC/DC and see them in concert one night in 1991. After a near death experience, the five make a pact that if one among them died the other four would be bury him next to the grave of their idol, the late AC/DC frontman, Bon Scott. Twelve years pass and the five friends have each gone their own ways. When Ronnie dies from being struck by a lightning bolt while playing golf, the remaining four unite and decide to fulfill the promise they made together long ago. They retrieve Ronnie's cremated remains and embark on a road trip to Fremantle (where Bon Scott's ashes were scattered) to scatter his ashes over Fremantle Cemetery.

== Cast ==
- Stephen Curry as Ben
- Damon Gameau as Sonny
- Ryan Johnson as Lloyd
- Callan Mulvey as Sam
- Sam Worthington as Ronnie
- Roy Billing as Tiny
- Rachel Gordon as Molly
- George Kapiniaris as Mr Koyths
- Saskia Burmeister as Chloe
- Deborah Kennedy as Matron of Honour

== Production ==
Geoffrey Hall was responsible for the cinematography on the film, for which he won the Silver Award from the Australian Cinematographers Society.

The title was taken from the AC/DC song "Thunderstruck".

== Release ==
The film was released on 8 September 2004.

== Reception ==
On review aggregator Rotten Tomatoes the film has a score of 57% based on reviews from seven critics, with an average 5.3/10 rating.

== Box office ==
Thunderstruck grossed $908,294 at the box office in Australia.

== See also ==
- Cinema of Australia
- South Australian Film Corporation
