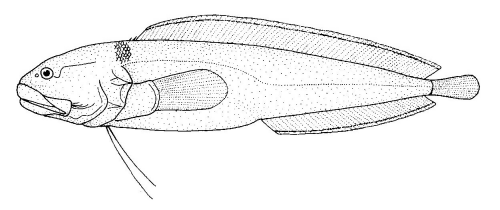
- Drawing by Dr Tony Ayling

Conservation status
- Least Concern (IUCN 3.1)

Scientific classification
- Kingdom: Animalia
- Phylum: Chordata
- Class: Actinopterygii
- Order: Ophidiiformes
- Family: Bythitidae
- Genus: Bidenichthys
- Species: B. consobrinus

Binomial name
- Bidenichthys consobrinus (F. W. Hutton, 1876)

Synonyms
- Dinematichthys consobrinus Hutton, 1876; Monothrix consobrinus (Hutton, 1876)

= Grey brotula =

Species of fish

The grey brotula or orange cuskeel (Bidenichthys consobrinus) is a rare species of viviparous brotula found around northern New Zealand. It inhabits rocky reef areas down to 30 m depth.

IUCN and the Catalog of Fishes consider Bidenichthys beeblebroxi a synonym of Bidenichthys consobrinus.
