= That Sugar Film =

- Release poster
- Directed by: Damon Gameau
- Written by: Damon Gameau
- Produced by: Nick Batzias; Damon Gameau; Rory Williamson
- Starring: Damon Gameau; Brenton Thwaites; Isabel Lucas; Zoe Tuckwell-Smith; Stephen Fry
- Cinematography: Judd Overton
- Edited by: Jane Usher
- Music by: Jojo Petrina
- Production company: Madman Entertainment
- Distributed by: Madman Entertainment
- Release dates: 20 November 2014 (IDFA); 1 June 2015 (Seattle International Film Festival); 31 July 2015 (USA)
- Running time: 90 minutes
- Country: Australia
- Language: English
- Box office: $1.5 million

That Sugar Film is a 2014 Australian documentary directed by and starring Damon Gameau. The film looks at hidden sugar in foods and the effect it can have on the human body.

== Plot ==
The film follows Gameau's experiment on himself, changing from his normal diet containing no refined sugar to a 'health-conscious' diet low in fat but high in sugar, equivalent to 160 grams (40 tsp) of sugar per day. As a result, Gameau gained weight, grew lethargic, and developed fatty liver disease. The sugar diet was selected such that his calorie intake was not increased from his normal diet.

Interviews with experts attribute this change to the high level of sugar he was ingesting, and in particular suggest that fructose may be the main culprit. It is suggested that artificial sweeteners may be no better.

The viewers are introduced to the "bliss point", a term coined in the 1960s which applies here to the amount of sugar you can add to a food to make it optimally desirable. Adding more sugar beyond the "bliss point" leads to a significant drop in desirability.

Following the experiment, he returned to his previous diet, and the ill effects were largely and quickly reversed.

== Cast ==
In addition to Gameau in the lead, the cast includes Hugh Jackman, Stephen Fry, Isabel Lucas, and Brenton Thwaites. Gary Taubes, Michael Moss and Dr. Kimber Stanhope gave interviews which are included, and Depeche Mode, Peter Gabriel and Florence and the Machine feature on the soundtrack. Gameau's partner, actress Zoe Tuckwell-Smith, appears in the film while pregnant with their daughter, who makes an appearance after being born during production.

== Reception ==
American reviews for the film were generally positive. According to a review by The New York Times, the "breezy blend of computer imagery, musical numbers, sketches and offbeat field trips" made "the nutrition lessons easy to digest". The Hollywood Reporter concluded that "Gameau clearly has good intentions, and generally succeeds in sweetening a potentially bitter subject for easy public consumption." However, a Slate review insisted "That Sugar Film is so highly processed, and so laden with chintzy, artificial arguments, that its many weaknesses are hidden from consumers."

A local Australian review in The Sydney Morning Herald claimed that the film is "not rigorous enough to prove anything at all".

An article from SBS Australia discussing the film's legacy describes it as "One of Australia’s most successful docos".

The film was recommended as an educational resource by the Documentary Australia Foundation, which said "THAT SUGAR FILM will forever change the way you think about 'healthy' food".
