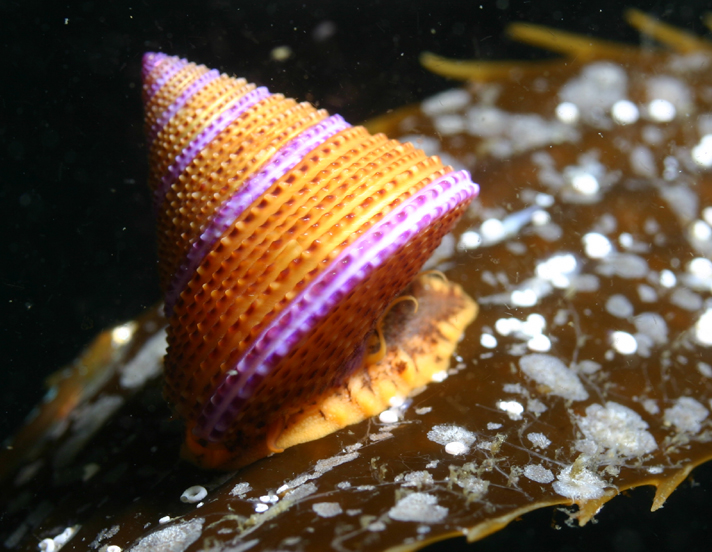
- Calliostoma annulatum crawling on a kelp leaf
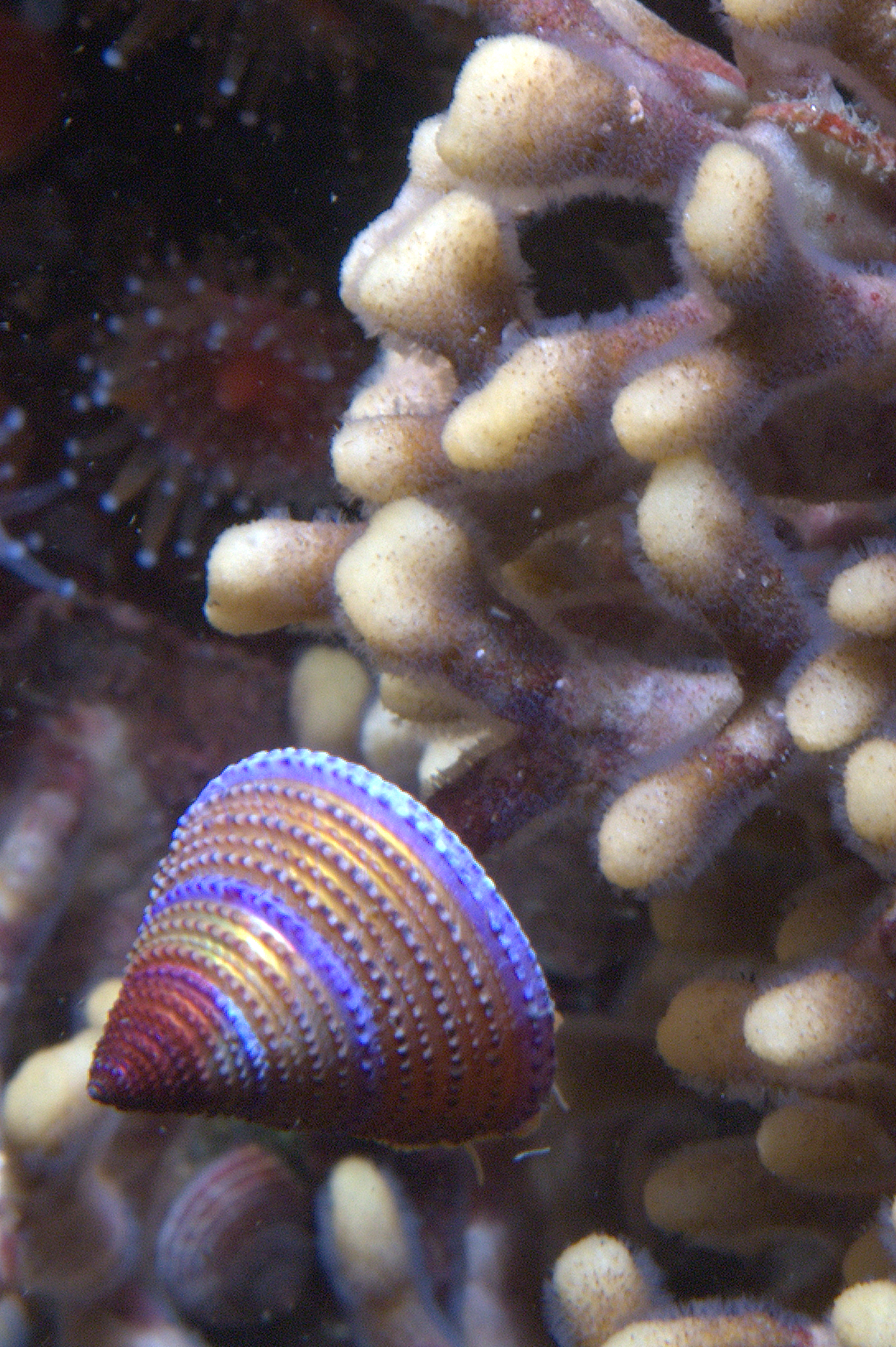

Scientific classification
- Kingdom: Animalia
- Phylum: Mollusca
- Class: Gastropoda
- Subclass: Vetigastropoda
- Order: Trochida
- Family: Calliostomatidae
- Genus: Calliostoma
- Species: C. annulatum

Binomial name
- Calliostoma annulatum (Lightfoot, 1786)

Synonyms
- Trochus annulatus Martyn, 1784; Trochus moniliferus Phil.; Trochus virgineus Chemnitz; Zizyphinus annulatus Martyn, Reeve,

= Calliostoma annulatum =

Jeweled topsnail

Species of gastropod

Calliostoma annulatum, also known as the purple-ring topsnail, blue-ring topsnail or jeweled topsnail, is a medium-sized sea snail with gills and an operculum.

This is a sublittoral marine gastropod mollusk in the family Calliostomatidae. This snail lives off of the Pacific coast of North America.

== Range of distribution ==
This top shell can be found in the littoral zone from Isla San Geronimo, Baja California, north to Forrester Island, Alaska.

== Shell description ==
The shell height varies between 16 mm and 35 mm. The elevated-conic shell is imperforate and rather thin. This species is distinguished by its brilliantly colored shell, which is lustrous with a gold field, dotted with brown on the spiral rows of grains, the periphery or lower edge of each whorl encircled by a zone of violet or magenta stripes, the axis surrounded by a tract of the same. The brilliance of the colors fades somewhat once the animal dies. The thin shell shows numerous granulose spiral riblets, about 7 on the penultimate whorl, 9 or 10 on the base. It has few or none interstitial lirulae. The acute, reddish apex is minute. The sutures are slightly impressed. There are about 9 whorls, slightly convex, the last angular at periphery, flattened beneath. The rhomboidal aperture is oblique, fluted within. There is no umbilicus. The head and foot of the animal has a yellow-orange color with brown spots. The color of the shell is gold with purple stripes.

== Life habits ==
This species is fairly omnivorous, feeding seasonally on kelp, sessile fauna like bryozoans, and detritus.

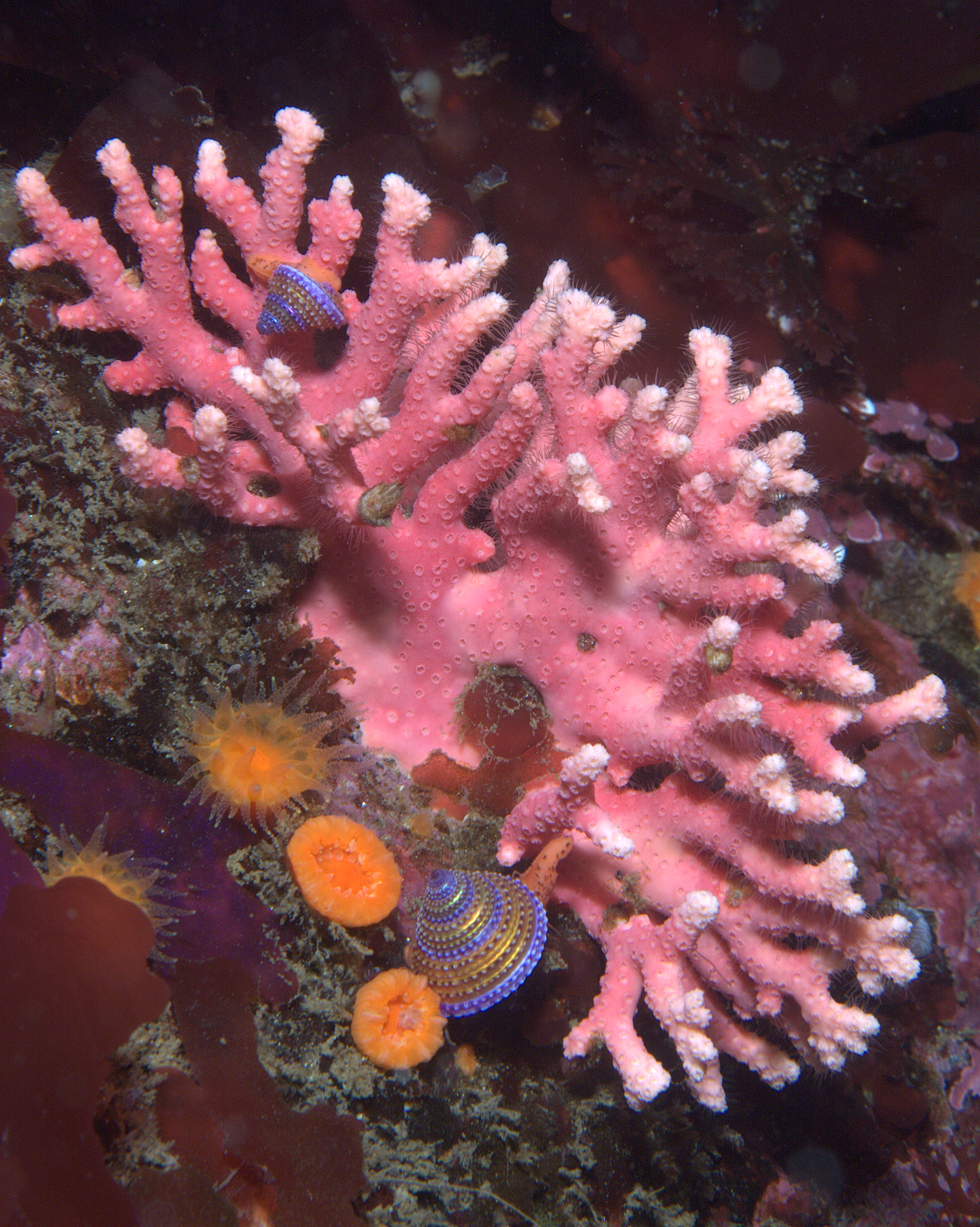
Two individuals of Calliostoma annulatum are visible on this hydrocoral
