= Kelp forest =

Underwater areas highly dense with kelp

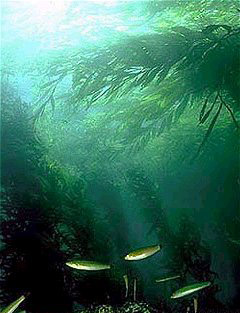
Kelp forest

Kelp forests are underwater areas with a high density of kelp, which covers a large part of the world's coastlines. Smaller areas of anchored kelp are called kelp beds. They are recognized as one of the most productive and dynamic ecosystems on Earth. Although algal kelp forest combined with coral reefs only cover 0.1% of Earth's total surface, they account for 0.9% of global primary productivity. Kelp forests occur worldwide throughout temperate and polar coastal oceans. In 2007, kelp forests were also discovered in tropical waters near Ecuador.

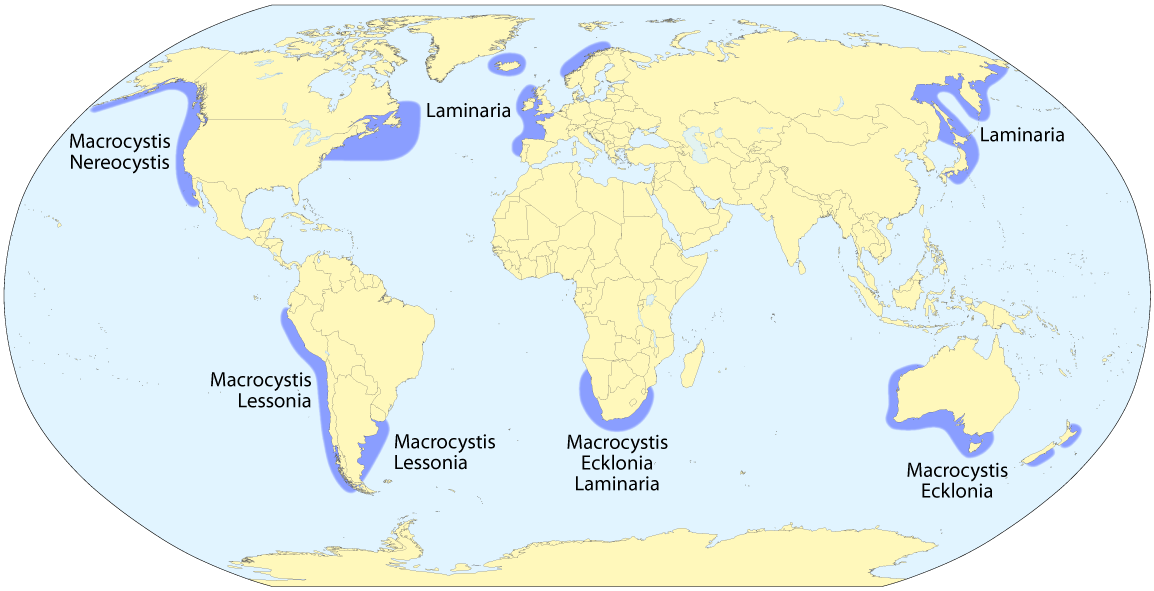
Global distribution of kelp forests

"I can only compare these great aquatic forests ... with the terrestrial ones in the intertropical regions. Yet if in any country a forest was destroyed, I do not believe so nearly so many species of animals would perish as would here, from the destruction of kelp. Amidst the leaves of this plant numerous species of fish live, which nowhere else could find food or shelter; with their destruction the many cormorants and other fishing birds, the otters, seals and porpoise, would soon perish also; and lastly, the Fuegian[s] ... would ... decrease in numbers and perhaps cease to exist.

— Charles Darwin, 1 June 1834, Tierra del Fuego, Chile

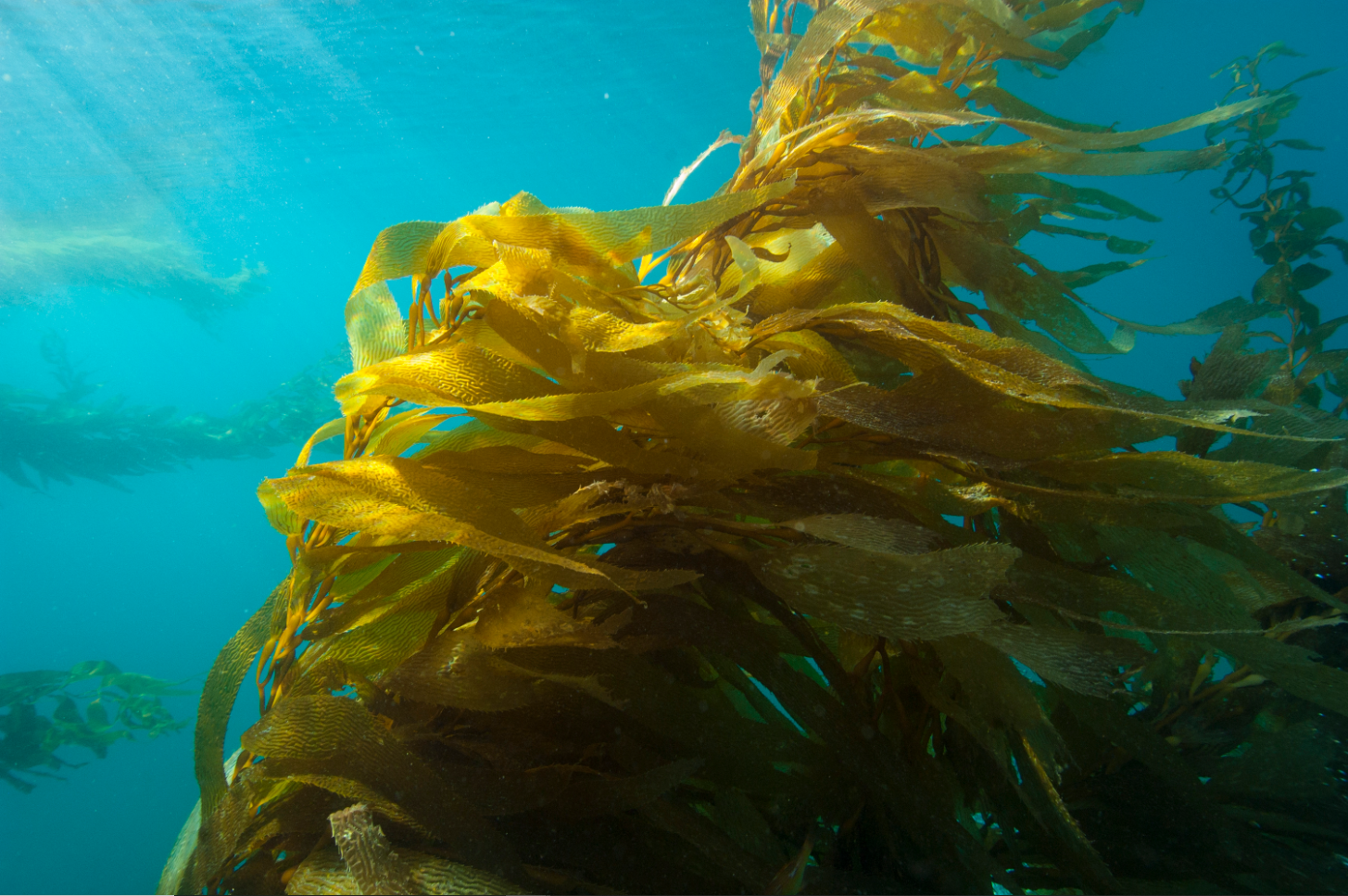
A kelp forest at Cojo Anchorage near Point Conception, California.

Physically formed by brown macroalgae, kelp forests provide a unique habitat for marine organisms and are a source for understanding many ecological processes. Over the last century, they have been the focus of extensive research, particularly in trophic ecology, and continue to provoke important ideas that are relevant beyond this unique ecosystem. For example, kelp forests can influence coastal oceanographic patterns and provide many ecosystem services.

However, the influence of humans has often contributed to kelp forest degradation. Of particular concern are the effects of overfishing nearshore ecosystems, which can release herbivores from their normal population regulation and result in the overgrazing of kelp and other algae. This can rapidly result in transitions to barren landscapes where relatively few species persist. Already due to the combined effects of overfishing and climate change, kelp forests have all but disappeared in many especially vulnerable places, such as Tasmania's east coast and the coast of Northern California. The implementation of marine protected areas is one management strategy useful for addressing such issues, since it may limit the impacts of fishing and buffer the ecosystem from additive effects of other environmental stressors.

== Kelp ==
The term kelp refers to marine algae belonging to the order Laminariales (phylum: Ochrophyta). Though not considered a taxonomically diverse order, kelps are highly diverse structurally and functionally. The most widely recognized species are the giant kelps (Macrocystis spp.), although numerous other genera such as Laminaria, Ecklonia, Lessonia, Nereocystis, Alaria, and Eisenia are described.

A wide range of sea life uses kelp forests for protection or food, including fish. In the North Pacific kelp forests, particularly rockfish, and many invertebrates, such as amphipods, shrimp, marine snails, bristle worms, and brittle stars. Many marine mammals and birds are also found, including seals, sea lions, whales, sea otters, gulls, terns, snowy egrets, great blue herons, and cormorants, as well as some shore birds.

Frequently considered an ecosystem engineer, kelp provides a physical substrate and habitat for kelp forest communities. In algae (kingdom Protista), the body of an individual organism is known as a thallus rather than as a plant (kingdom Plantae). The morphological structure of a kelp thallus is defined by three basic structural units:

- The holdfast is a root-like mass that anchors the thallus to the sea floor, though unlike true roots it is not responsible for absorbing and delivering nutrients to the rest of the thallus.
- The stipe is analogous to a plant stalk, extending vertically from the holdfast and providing a support framework for other morphological features.
- The fronds are leaf- or blade-like attachments extending from the stipe, sometimes along its full length, and are the sites of nutrient uptake and photosynthetic activity.

In addition, many kelp species have pneumatocysts, or gas-filled bladders, usually located at the base of fronds near the stipe. These structures provide the necessary buoyancy for kelp to maintain an upright position in the water column.

The environmental factors necessary for kelp to survive include hard substrate (usually rock or sand), high nutrients (e.g., nitrogen, phosphorus), and light (minimum annual irradiance dose > 50 E m^{−2}). Especially productive kelp forests tend to be associated with areas of significant oceanographic upwelling, a process that delivers cool, nutrient-rich water from depth to the ocean's mixed surface layer. Water flow and turbulence facilitate nutrient assimilation across kelp fronds throughout the water column. Water clarity affects the depth to which sufficient light can be transmitted. In ideal conditions, giant kelp (Macrocystis spp.) can grow as much as 30–60 cm vertically per day. Some species, such as Nereocystis, are annuals, while others such as Eisenia are perennials, living for more than 20 years. In perennial kelp forests, maximum growth rates occur during upwelling months (typically spring and summer) and die-backs correspond to reduced nutrient availability, shorter photoperiods, and increased storm frequency.

Kelps are primarily associated with temperate and arctic waters worldwide. Of the more dominant genera, Laminaria is mainly associated with both sides of the Atlantic Ocean and the coasts of China and Japan; Ecklonia is found in Australia, New Zealand, and South Africa; and Macrocystis occurs throughout the northeastern and southeastern Pacific Ocean, Southern Ocean archipelagos, and in patches around Australia, New Zealand, and South Africa. The region with the greatest diversity of kelps (>20 species) is the northeastern Pacific, from north of San Francisco, California, to the Aleutian Islands, Alaska.

Although kelp forests are unknown in tropical surface waters, a few species of Laminaria have been known to occur exclusively in tropical deep waters. This general absence of kelp from the tropics is believed to be mostly due to insufficient nutrient levels associated with warm, oligotrophic waters. One recent study spatially overlaid the requisite physical parameters for kelp with mean oceanographic conditions and produced a model predicting the existence of subsurface kelps throughout the tropics worldwide to depths of 200 m (660 ft). For a hotspot in the Galapagos Islands, the local model was improved with fine-scale data and tested; the research team found thriving kelp forests in all eight of their sampled sites, all of which had been predicted by the model, thus validating their approach. This suggests that their global model might actually be fairly accurate, and if so, kelp forests would be prolific in tropical subsurface waters worldwide. The importance of this contribution has been rapidly acknowledged within the scientific community and has prompted an entirely new trajectory of kelp forest research, highlighting the potential for kelp forests to provide marine organisms spatial refuge under climate change and providing possible explanations for evolutionary patterns of kelps worldwide.

== Ecosystem architecture ==
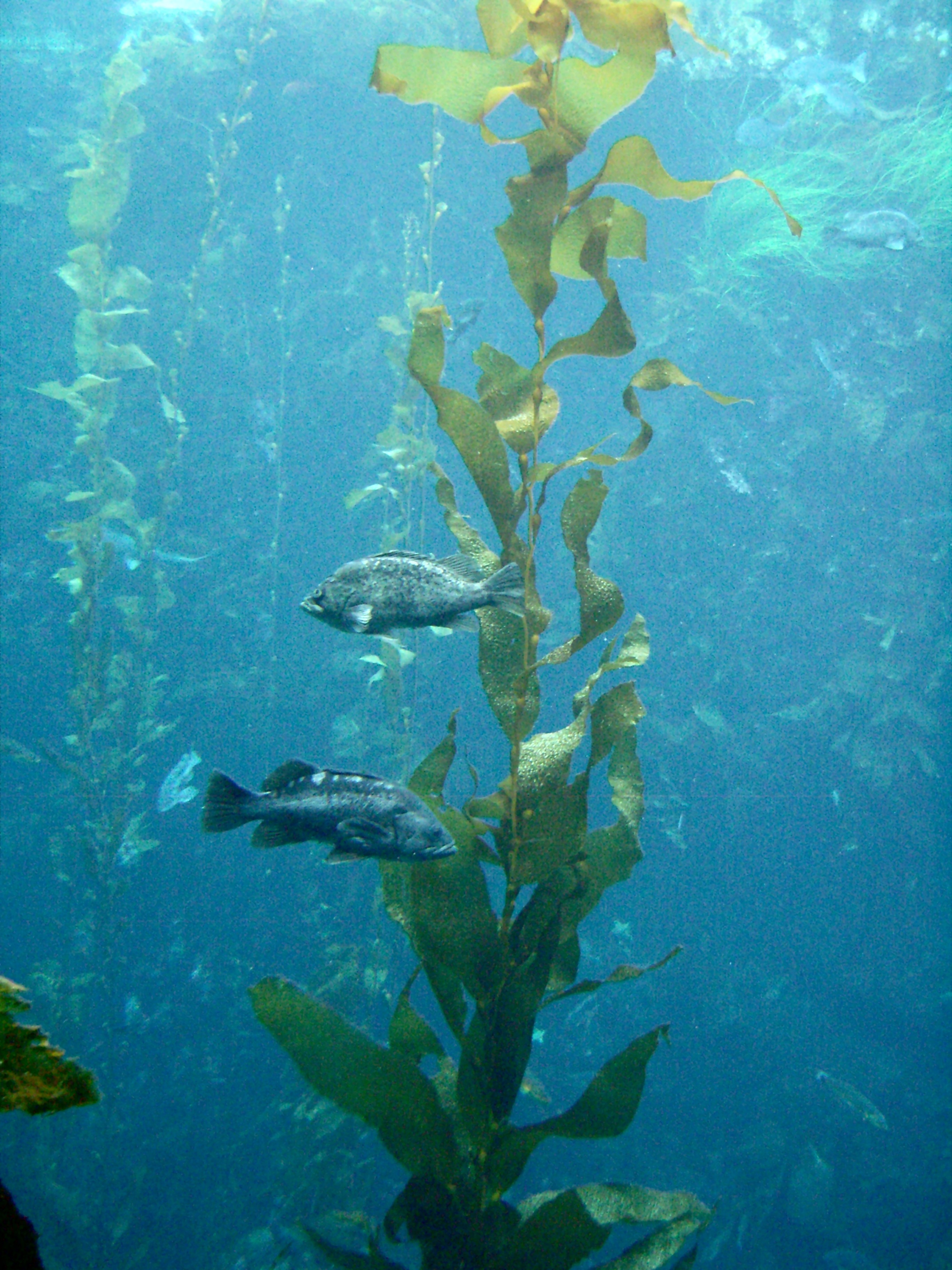
Rockfish swimming around giant kelp

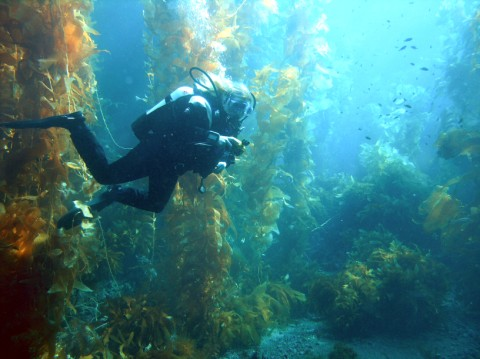
A diver in a kelp forest off the coast of California

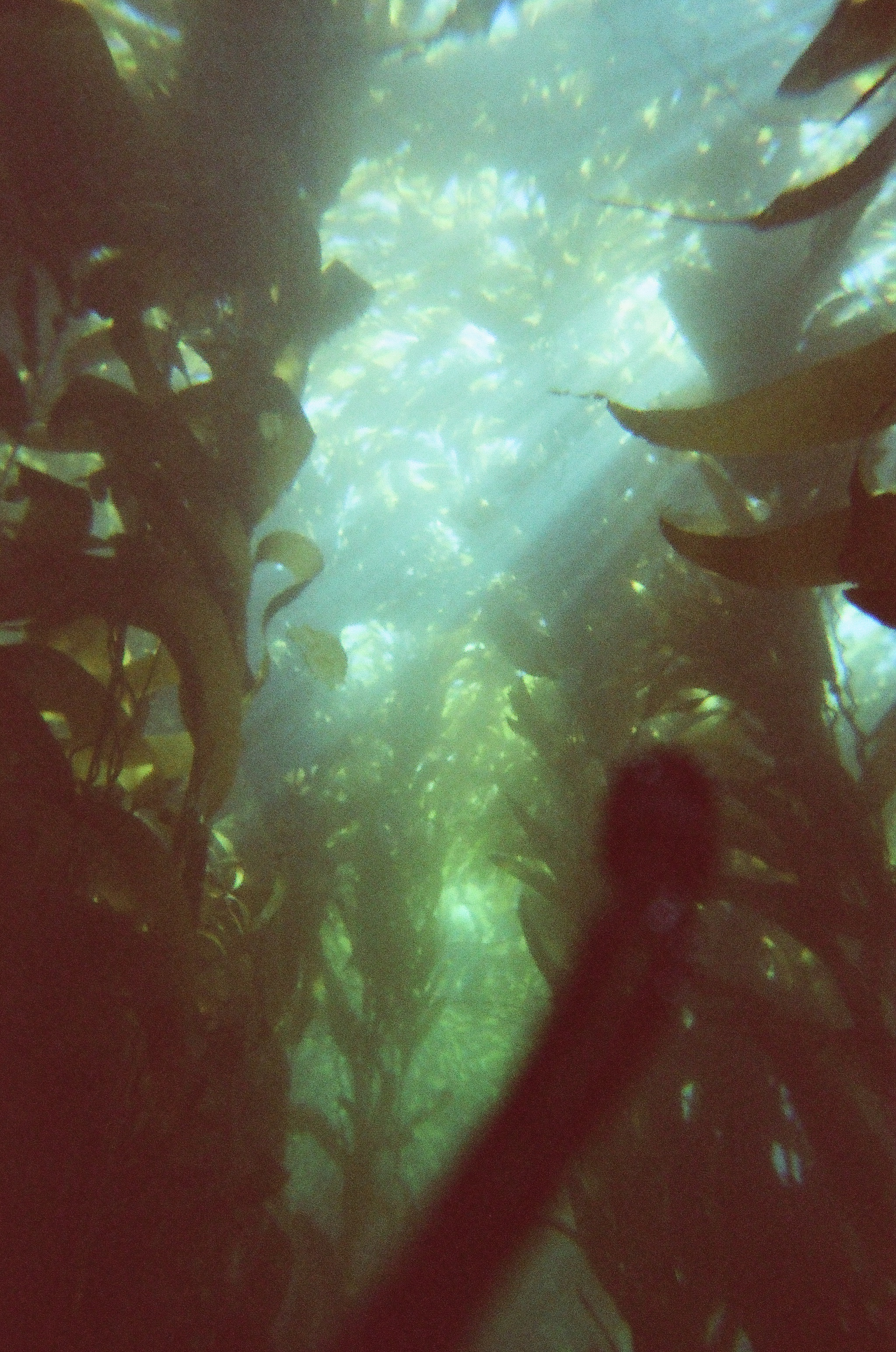
A kelp forest off of the coast of Anacapa Island, California

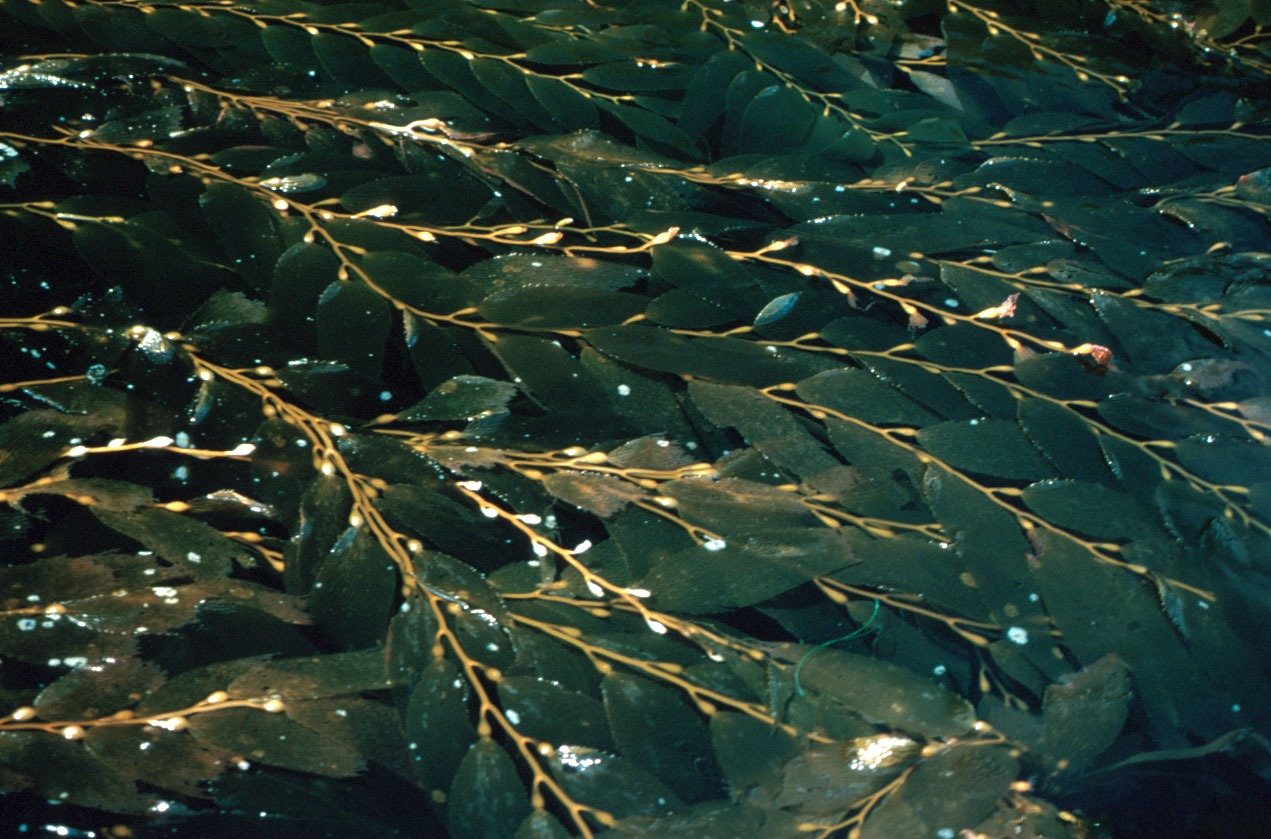
Giant kelp uses gas-filled floats to keep the thallus suspended, allowing the kelp blades near the ocean surface to capture light for photosynthesis.

The architecture of a kelp forest ecosystem is based on its physical structure, which influences the associated species that define its community structure. Structurally, the ecosystem includes three guilds of kelp and two guilds occupied by other algae:

- Canopy kelps include the largest species and often constitute floating canopies that extend to the ocean surface (e.g., Macrocystis and Alaria).
- Stipitate kelps generally extend a few meters above the sea floor and can grow in dense aggregations (e.g., Eisenia and Ecklonia).
- Prostrate kelps lie near and along the sea floor (e.g., Laminaria).
- The benthic assemblage is composed of other algal species (e.g., filamentous and foliose functional groups, articulated corallines) and sessile organisms along the ocean bottom.
- Encrusting coralline algae directly and often extensively cover geologic substrate.

Multiple kelp species often co-exist within a forest; the term understory canopy refers to the stipitate and prostrate kelps. For example, a Macrocystis canopy may extend many meters above the seafloor towards the ocean surface, while an understory of the kelps Eisenia and Pterygophora reaches upward only a few meters. Beneath these kelps, a benthic assemblage of foliose red algae may occur. The dense vertical infrastructure with overlying canopy forms a system of microenvironments similar to those observed in a terrestrial forest, with a sunny canopy region, a partially shaded middle, and darkened seafloor. Each guild has associated organisms, which vary in their levels of dependence on the habitat, and the assemblage of these organisms can vary with kelp morphologies. For example, in California, Macrocystis pyrifera forests, the nudibranch Melibe leonina, and skeleton shrimp Caprella californica are closely associated with surface canopies; the kelp perch Brachyistius frenatus, rockfish Sebastes spp., and many other fishes are found within the stipitate understory; brittle stars and turban snails Tegula spp. are closely associated with the kelp holdfast, while various herbivores, such as sea urchins and abalone, live under the prostrate canopy; many seastars, hydroids, and benthic fishes live among the benthic assemblages; solitary corals, various gastropods, and echinoderms live over the encrusting coralline algae. In addition, pelagic fishes and marine mammals are loosely associated with kelp forests, usually interacting near the edges as they visit to feed on resident organisms.

== Trophic ecology ==
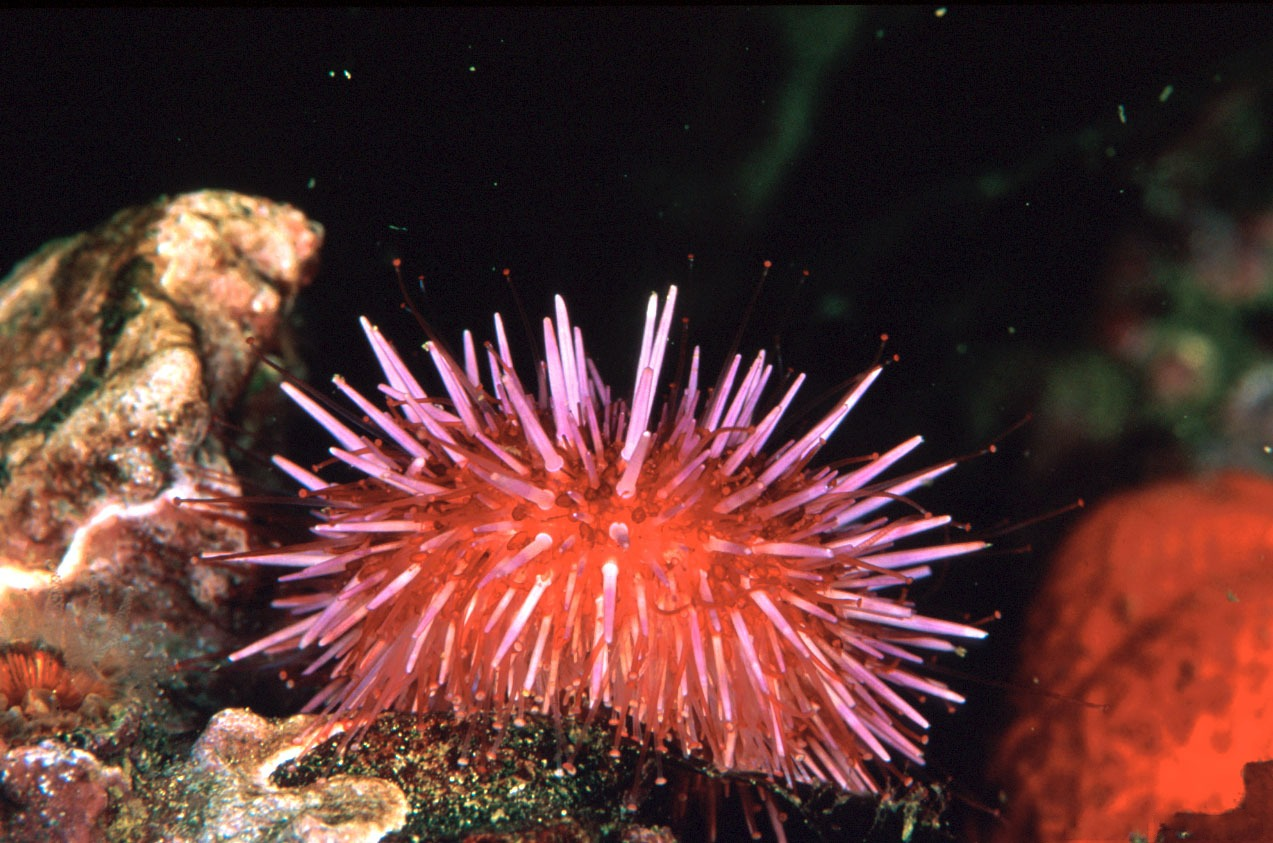
Sea urchins like this purple sea urchin can damage kelp forests by chewing through kelp holdfasts

The sea otter is an important predator of sea urchins

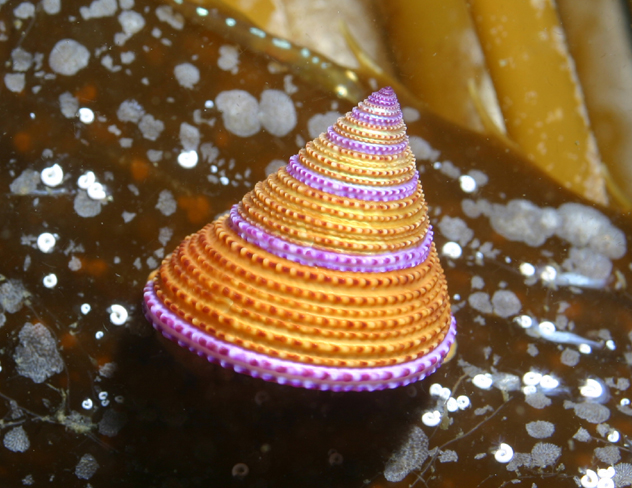
The jeweled top snail Calliostoma annulatum grazing on a blade of giant kelp

Classic studies in kelp forest ecology have largely focused on trophic interactions (the relationships between organisms and their food webs), particularly the understanding and top-down trophic processes. Bottom-up processes are generally driven by the abiotic conditions required for primary producers to grow, such as availability of light and nutrients, and the subsequent transfer of energy to consumers at higher trophic levels. For example, the occurrence of kelp is frequently correlated with oceanographic upwelling zones, which provide unusually high concentrations of nutrients to the local environment. This allows kelp to grow and subsequently support herbivores, which in turn support consumers at higher trophic levels. By contrast, in top-down processes, predators limit the biomass of species at lower trophic levels through consumption. In the absence of predation, these lower-level species flourish because resources that support their energetic requirements are not limiting. In a well-studied example from Alaskan kelp forests, sea otters (Enhydra lutris) control populations of herbivorous sea urchins through predation. When sea otters are removed from the ecosystem (for example, by human exploitation), urchin populations are released from predatory control and grow dramatically. This leads to increased herbivore pressure on local kelp stands. Deterioration of the kelp itself results in the loss of physical ecosystem structure and subsequently, the loss of other species associated with this habitat. In Alaskan kelp forest ecosystems, sea otters are the keystone species that mediates this trophic cascade. In Southern California, kelp forests persist without sea otters and the control of herbivorous urchins is instead mediated by a suite of predators including lobsters and large fishes, such as the California sheephead. The effect of removing one predatory species in this system differs from Alaska because redundancy exists in the trophic levels and other predatory species can continue to regulate urchins. However, the removal of multiple predators can effectively release urchins from predator pressure and allow the system to follow trajectories towards kelp forest degradation. Similar examples exist in Nova Scotia, South Africa, Australia, and Chile. The relative importance of top-down versus bottom-up control in kelp forest ecosystems and the strengths of trophic interactions continue to be the subject of considerable scientific investigation.

The transition from macroalgal (i.e. kelp forest) to denuded landscapes dominated by sea urchins (or 'urchin barrens') is a widespread phenomenon, often resulting from trophic cascades like those described above; the two phases are regarded as alternative stable states of the ecosystem. The recovery of kelp forests from barren states has been documented following dramatic perturbations, such as urchin disease or large shifts in thermal conditions. Recovery from intermediate states of deterioration is less predictable and depends on a combination of abiotic factors and biotic interactions in each case.

Though urchins are usually the dominant herbivores, others with significant interaction strengths include seastars, isopods, kelp crabs, and herbivorous fishes. In many cases, these organisms feed on kelp that has been dislodged from substrate and drifts near the ocean floor rather than expend energy searching for intact thalli on which to feed. When sufficient drift kelp is available, herbivorous grazers do not exert pressure on attached thalli; when drift subsidies are unavailable, grazers directly impact the physical structure of the ecosystem. Many studies in Southern California have demonstrated that the availability of drift kelp specifically influences the foraging behavior of sea urchins. Drift kelp and kelp-derived particulate matter have also been important in subsidizing adjacent habitats, such as sandy beaches and the rocky intertidal.

== Patch dynamics ==
Another major area of kelp forest research has been directed at understanding the spatial-temporal patterns of kelp patches. Not only do such dynamics affect the physical landscape, but they also affect species that associate with kelp for refuge or foraging activities. Large-scale environmental disturbances have offered important insights concerning mechanisms and ecosystem resilience. Examples of environmental disturbances include:

- Acute and chronic pollution events have been shown to impact southern California kelp forests, though the intensity of the impact seems to depend on both the nature of the contaminants and duration of exposure. Pollution can include sediment deposition and eutrophication from sewage, industrial byproducts and contaminants like PCBs and heavy metals (for example, copper, zinc), runoff of organophosphates from agricultural areas, anti-fouling chemicals used in harbors and marinas (for example, TBT and creosote) and land-based pathogens like fecal coliform bacteria.
- Catastrophic storms can remove surface kelp canopies through wave activity, but usually leave understory kelps intact; they can also remove urchins when little spatial refuge is available. Interspersed canopy clearings create a seascape mosaic where sunlight penetrates deeper into the kelp forest and species that are normally light-limited in the understory can flourish. Similarly, substrate cleared of kelp holdfasts can provide space for other sessile species to establish themselves and occupy the seafloor, sometimes directly competing with juvenile kelp and even inhibiting their settlement.
- El Niño-Southern Oscillation (ENSO) events involve the depression of oceanographic thermoclines, severe reductions of nutrient input, and changes in storm patterns. Stress due to warm water and nutrient depletion can increase the susceptibility of kelp to storm damage and herbivorous grazing, sometimes even prompting phase shifts to urchin-dominated landscapes. In general, oceanographic conditions (that is, water temperature, currents) influence the recruitment success of kelp and its competitors, which clearly affect subsequent species interactions and kelp forest dynamics.
- Overfishing higher trophic levels that naturally regulate herbivore populations is also recognized as an important stressor in kelp forests. As described in the previous section, the drivers and outcomes of trophic cascades are important for understanding spatial-temporal patterns of kelp forests.

In addition to ecological monitoring of kelp forests before, during, and after such disturbances, scientists try to tease apart the intricacies of kelp forest dynamics using experimental manipulations. By working on smaller spatial-temporal scales, they can control for the presence or absence of specific biotic and abiotic factors to discover the operative mechanisms. For example, in southern Australia, manipulations of kelp canopy types demonstrated that the relative amount of Ecklonia radiata in a canopy could be used to predict understory species assemblages; consequently, the proportion of E. radiata can be used as an indicator of other species occurring in the environment.

== Human use ==
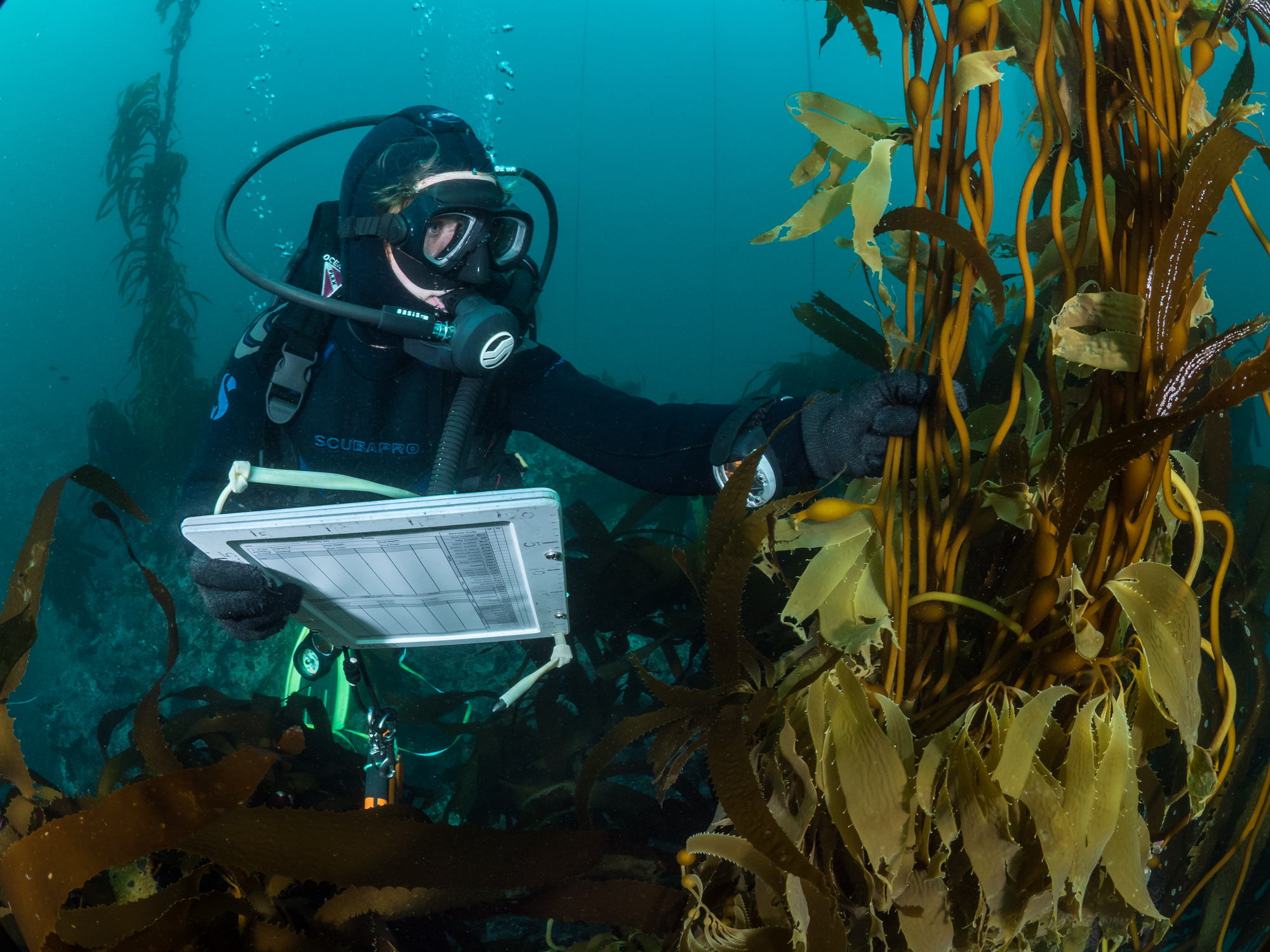
A diver measures kelp growth

Kelp forests have been important to human existence for thousands of years. Indeed, many now theorise that the first colonisation of the Americas was due to fishing communities following the Pacific kelp forests during the last ice age. One theory contends that the kelp forests that would have stretched from northeast Asia to the American Pacific coast would have provided many benefits to ancient boaters The kelp forests would have provided many sustenance opportunities, as well as acting as a type of buffer from rough water. Besides these benefits, researchers believe that the kelp forests might have helped early boaters navigate, acting as a type of "kelp highway". Theorists also suggest that the kelp forests would have helped these ancient colonists by providing a stable way of life and preventing them from having to adapt to new ecosystems and develop new survival methods even as they traveled thousands of miles.

Modern economies are based on fisheries of kelp-associated species such as lobster and rockfish. Humans can also harvest kelp directly to feed aquaculture species such as abalone and to extract the compound alginic acid, which is used in products like toothpaste and antacids. Kelp forests are valued for recreational activities such as SCUBA diving and kayaking; the industries that support these sports represent one benefit related to the ecosystem and the enjoyment derived from these activities represents another. All of these are examples of ecosystem services provided specifically by kelp forests. The Monterey Bay aquarium was the first aquarium to exhibit an alive kelp forest.

=== As carbon sequesters ===
Kelp forests grow in rocky places along the shore that are constantly eroding carrying material out to the deep sea. The kelp then sinks to the ocean floor and store the carbon where is it unlikely to be disturbed by human activity. Researchers from the University of Western Australia estimated kelp forest around Australia sequestered 1.3-2.8 teragrams of carbon per year which is 27–34% of the total annual blue carbon sequestered in the Australian continent by tidal marshes, mangrove forests and seagrass beds. Every year 200 million tons of carbon dioxide are being sequestered by macroalgae such as kelp.

== Threats and management ==
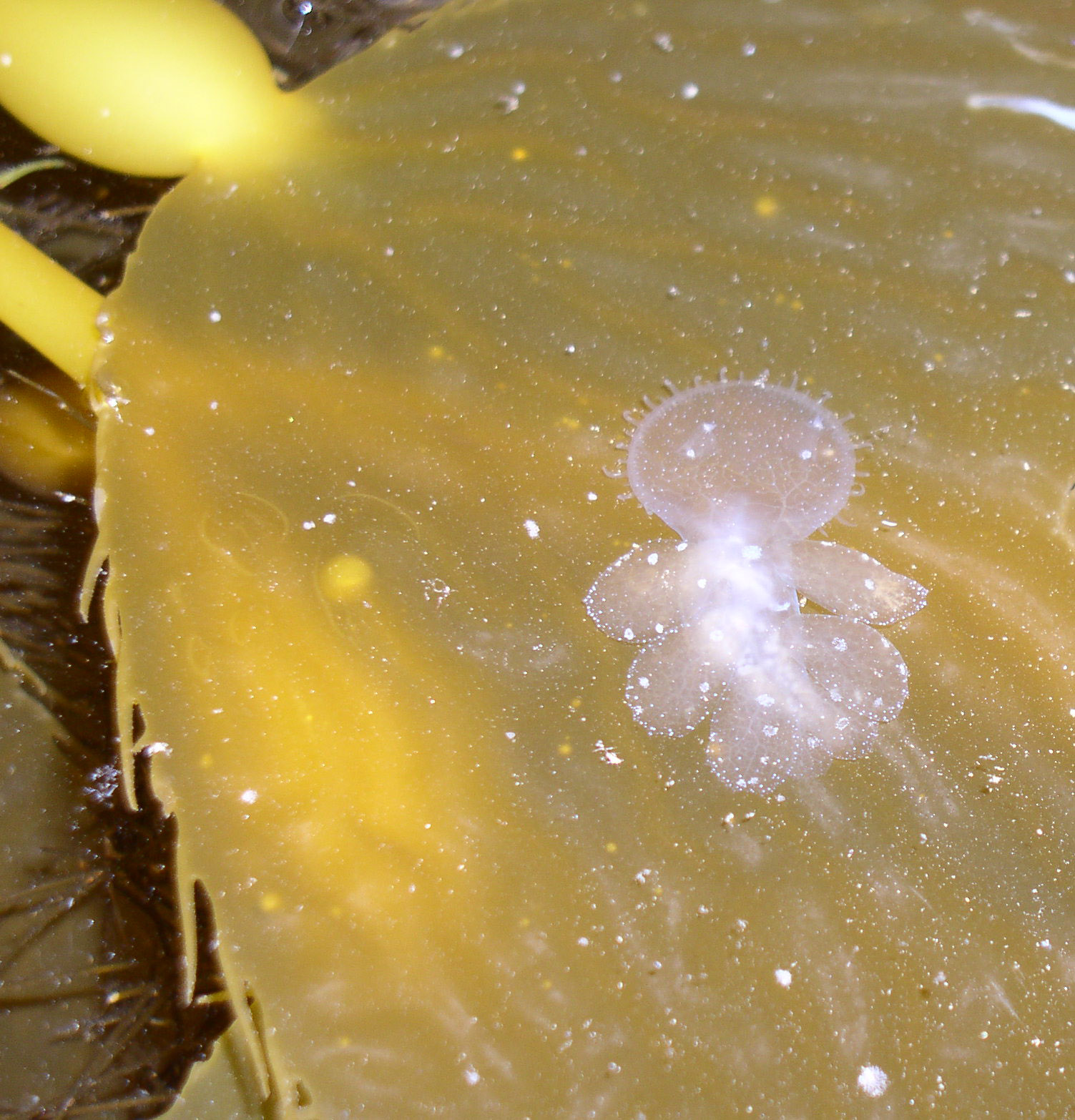
The nudibranch Melibe leonina on a Macrocystis frond (California): Marine protected areas are one way to guard kelp forests as an ecosystem.

Given the complexity of kelp forests – their variable structure, geography, and interactions – they pose a considerable challenge to environmental managers. Extrapolating even well-studied trends to the future is difficult because interactions within the ecosystem will change under variable conditions, not all relationships in the ecosystem are understood, and the nonlinear thresholds to transitions are not yet recognized.

Major issues of concern include marine pollution and water quality, kelp harvesting and fisheries, invasive species, and climate change. The most pressing threat to kelp forest preservation may be the overfishing of coastal ecosystems, which by removing higher trophic levels facilitates their shift to depauperate urchin barrens. The maintenance of biodiversity is recognized as a way of generally stabilizing ecosystems and their services through mechanisms such as functional compensation and reduced susceptibility to foreign species invasions. More recently, the 2022 IPCC report states that kelp and other seaweeds in most regions are undergoing mass mortalities from high temperature extremes and range shifts from warming, as they are stationary and cannot adapt quick enough to deal with the rapidly increasing temperature of the Earth and thus, the ocean.

In many places, managers have opted to regulate the harvest of kelp and/or the taking of kelp forest species by fisheries. While these may be effective in one sense, they do not necessarily protect the entirety of the ecosystem. Marine protected areas (MPAs) offer a unique solution that encompasses not only target species for harvesting, but also the interactions surrounding them and the local environment as a whole. Direct benefits of MPAs to fisheries (for example, spillover effects) have been well documented around the world. Indirect benefits have also been shown for several cases among species such as abalone and fishes in Central California. Most importantly, MPAs can be effective at protecting existing kelp forest ecosystems and may also allow for the regeneration of those that have been affected. A 2023 report by the United Nations Environment Programme noted that kelp forest restoration efforts have become more widespread in recent decades, and may provide economic benefits to nearby coastal communities.

=== Kelp forest restoration in California ===
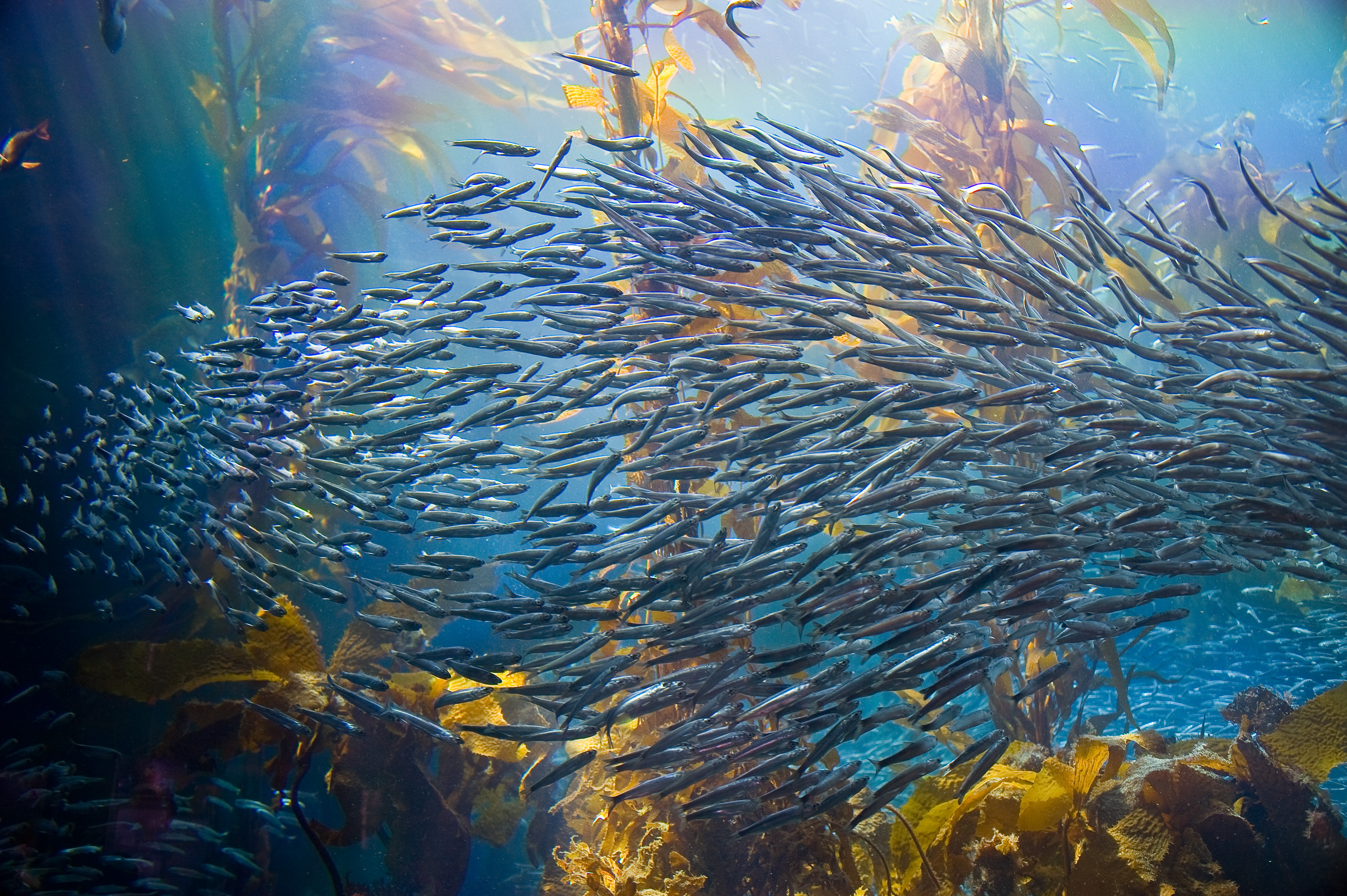
Fish swarming through a kelp forest

In the 2010s, Northern California lost 95% of its kelp ecosystems due to marine heatwaves.

Kelp bed recovery efforts in California are primarily focusing on sea urchin removal, both by scuba divers, and by sea otters, which are natural predators.

A brown alga, Sargassum horneri, an invasive species first spotted in 2003, has also been a concern.

The Sunflower sea star is an important keystone species which helps control sea urchin abundance, but an outbreak of Sea star wasting disease and a vulnerability to climate change has led to its critical endangerment.

Researchers at the Bodega Marine Laboratory of UC Davis are developing replanting strategies, and volunteers of the Orange County Coastkeeper group are replanting giant kelp. Humboldt State University began cultivating bull kelp in its research farm in 2021.

Research efforts at the state level to prevent kelp forest collapse in California were announced in July 2020.

At the federal level, H.R. 4458, the Keeping Ecosystems Living and Productive (KELP) Act, introduced July 29, 2021, seeks to establish a new grant program within NOAA for kelp forest restoration.

Ocean Rainforest, a Faroe Islands-based company, secured $4.5 million in U.S. government funding to grow giant kelp on an 86-acre farm off the coast of Santa Barbara, California.

== See also ==
- Aquaculture of giant kelp
