= Damon Gameau =

Australian actor

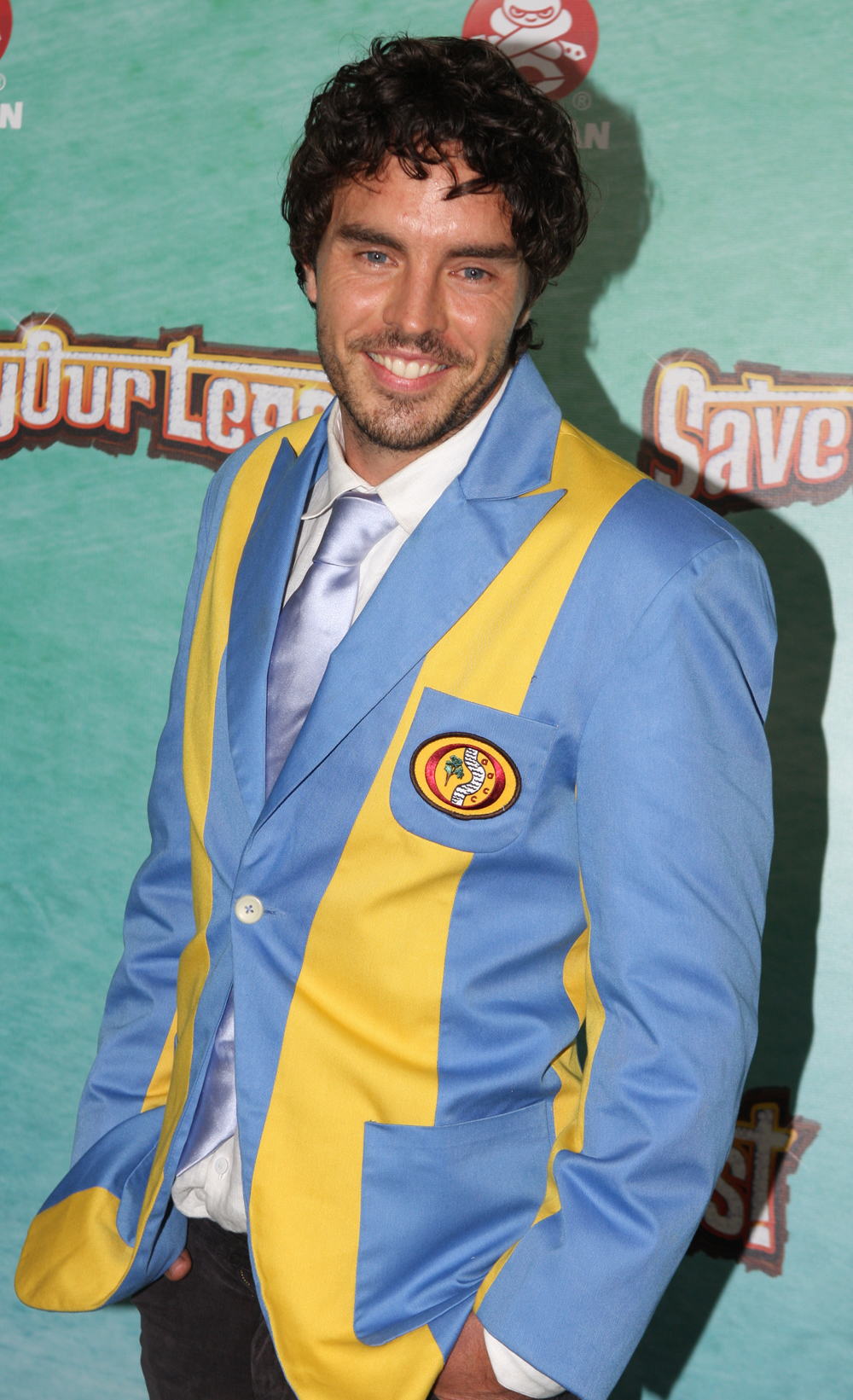
- Gameau at the Save Your Legs! premiere in Sydney, Australia, February 2013
- Born: Damon Gameau; 1982 (age 43–44); Adelaide, South Australia, Australia
- Education: National Institute of Dramatic Art (NIDA)
- Occupations: Actor, director, and producer
- Notable work: That Sugar Film; 2040
- Spouse: Zoe Tuckwell-Smith (m. 2016)
- Children: 2

Damon Gameau (born 1982) is an Australian actor, director, and producer, most known for his documentaries That Sugar Film and 2040. Gameau has also appeared in a number of award-winning TV shows and films, such as Love My Way, The Tracker, and Balibo.

== Early life ==
Damon Gameau was born in 1982 and was and raised in Adelaide, Australia. In 1997, he attended National Institute of Dramatic Art (NIDA).

== Career ==
Gameau graduated from Australia's National Institute of Dramatic Art (NIDA) with a degree in Performing Arts (Acting) in 1999.

In 2011, he won the short film competition, Tropfest with his animation 'Animal Beatbox'.

In 2014, he announced the production of the documentary That Sugar Film in which he relates the dire mood swings and weight gain he experienced after taking on the low-fat, high-sugar diet for 60 days. Gameau wrote a companion book for the film, That Sugar Book, which reached the top of the Health & Well-being best-seller lists in Australia.

That Sugar Film is the highest-grossing Australian documentary released in cinemas across Australia and New Zealand.

His most recent film, 2040, is a documentary presented as a letter to his 4-year-old daughter showing her what the world could look like in 2040 if the best solutions to many of the world's environmental challenges are put into action. It premiered at the Berlin Film Festival and has recently become one of the highest grossing Australian documentaries of all time in Australia. He also wrote an accompanying book, 2040: Handbook for the Regeneration.

He appeared in the 2009 feature film Balibo, in which he plays the part of Seven Network reporter Greg Shackleton. He starred as Scotsman Andy Maher in the Australian TV miniseries Underbelly: A Tale of Two Cities.

Gameau starred as Sonny in the Australian movie Thunderstruck, a tale of a group of friends and their devotion to AC/DC and in particular Bon Scott.

He appeared in RTÉ's latest Irish drama, Raw, based in an exclusive Dublin restaurant. playing the head chef Geoff Mitchell from Seasons 1 to 5. Gameau portrayed a homosexual character and received great praise for his performance throughout his time on the series. He also starred in Spirited as Adrian Brixton alongside Claudia Karvan and Matt King.

In 2012, he featured in both episodes of the drama-miniseries Howzat! Kerry Packer's War as Australian batsman Greg Chappell.

In 2013, he appeared in an episode of Wentworth as Mark Pearson.

Gameau is married to Winners and Losers actress, Zoe Tuckwell-Smith. Together they have 2 children.

== Awards and honours ==
Gameau was nominated for NSW Australian of the Year in 2020 for his work in creating 'the Regeneration' movement which is associated with his film 2040.

- Gameau won the Best Documentary Award for That Sugar Film at the Australian Film and Television Awards in 2016.
- In 2007, Gameau won the Best Actor award for his role in the film Vermin at the Sydney Underground Film Festival.
- Nominated for Best Supporting Actor for Balibo at the AFI Awards.
- Gameau has begun a directing career also with his film One, reaching the finals of Tropfest in 2010 and his film Animal Beatbox winning the 2011 competition.

His first documentary feature, That Sugar Film, was selected for Berlin Film Festival and IDFA.. The film was nominated for the AACTA award for best feature-length documentary. It is still the highest grossing Australian documentary of all time across Australia and New Zealand.

== Filmography ==
=== Film ===
Year	Title	Role	Type
2002	The Tracker	The Follower	Feature film
2003	The 13th House	Mark Waterman	Film
2004	Thunderstruck	Sonny	Feature film
2006	Court of Lonely Royals	Holden Janicowsky	Film
2007	Razzle Dazzle: A Journey into Dance	Neil	Mockumentary film
2009	Balibo	Greg Shackleton	Feature film
2012	Save Your Legs!	Stav	Feature film
2013	Patrick: Evil Awakens	Ed Penhaligon	Feature film
2013	Charlie's Country	Darwin Hospital Nurse	Feature film
2014	That Sugar Film	Himself	Documentary film
2019	2040	Himself	Documentary film
2025	Climate Change and Me: Future Council	Himself	Documentary film

=== Television ===
Year	Title	Role	Type
2001	Going Home	Shane	TV series
2002	White Collar Blue	Michael Carl	TV series
2004	Love My Way	Felix	TV series
2007	How I Met Your Mother	Australian Backpacker	TV series
2008-13	Raw	Geoff Mitchell	TV series, season 1-5
2009	Underbelly: A Tale of Two Cities	Andy Maher	TV series
2010	Spirited	Adrian Brixton	TV series
2011	SLiDE	Ash	TV series
2012	Howzat! Kerry Packer's War	Greg Chappell	TV miniseries
2012	Puberty Blues	Larry	TV series
2013	Mr & Mrs Murder	Tom Di Biasi	TV miniseries
2013	Wentworth	Mark Pearson	TV miniseries
2014	Secrets & Lies	Dave Carroll	TV miniseries
2015	Gallipoli	Keith Murdoch	TV miniseries
2015	Miss Fisher's Murder Mysteries	Dr. Allen Perkins	TV series
2016	Barracuda	Ben Whitter	TV miniseries
2016	The Kettering Incident	Jens Jorgensson	TV miniseries
