= RethinkX =

Think-tank regarding disruptive innovations

- Formation: 2016; 10 years ago
- Type: Public policy think tank
- Key people: Tony Seba; James Arbib
- Website: rethinkx.com

RethinkX is a think tank founded by Tony Seba and James Arbib that focuses on identifying disruptive innovations that could soon impact society.

== Rethinking Transportation 2020–2030 ==
"Rethinking Transportation", published in 2017, builds on the ideas described in two of Seba's previously published books. The thesis of "Rethinking Transportation" is that, by 2030, a convergence of exponentially-improving factors will make it cheaper for urban and suburban dwellers to subscribe to Transportation as a Service (TaaS), using self-driving electric cars, than to own their own car. The converging factors cited in the book include:

- The falling cost of solar-generated electricity
- The falling cost of battery storage
- The falling cost of electric vehicles (including purchase price and lifetime operating costs)
- The rising autonomy of self-driving vehicles

RethinkX's predictions regarding TaaS have led to debate. Critics generally agreed that the transition to TaaS would happen, but that it would take longer and/or be less complete than RethinkX predicted, for reasons that were:

- Economic: Tammy Klein, Founder & CEO of Transport Energy Strategies, stated that RethinkX's TaaS predictions lack "a fundamental understanding of the oil/refining industry, future fuel demand and where that demand would be coming from."
- Political: Jeff Siegel, in Energy and Capital—"Practical investment analysis in the new energy economy"—stated that "continued advances in technology will ultimately make renewable energy the most rational choice for electricity generation and, in many cases, transportation" but that "Seba said it's just a matter of policy makers understanding this and making regulations appropriately. And there's the major speed bump…The truth is, you can't rely on policy makers for anything. In fact, I would argue that because of special interests running our government and the inability for most politicians to base their decisions on anything beyond what is in their best interests (not the American people), the transition to a more economically sustainable energy economy will be slower than it should be."
- Emotional: Kyle Ashdown, writing for CarThrottle—"The internet's largest community for car enthusiasts"—stated that "Owning a car has thus far been an immortal component of the American Dream, and I don't see people being very willing to give up the emotional attachment to their own cars. People don't make decisions purely based on economic efficiency."
- Techno-utopian: Automotive technology trend expert Derek Kaufman described RethinkX's view as a "utopian future," and Justin Rowlatt, then Chief Environment Correspondent at the BBC, wrote that "we are a long way from this utopia."

"Rethinking Transportation 2020–2030" and its precursors (Solar Trillions and Clean Energy Disruption) made specific predictions for the future prices of solar energy, lithium-ion batteries, electric vehicles, and other items, for each year between their respective dates of publication and 2035.

=== 2021: The Great Stranding ===
This report can be seen as an addendum to 2017's Rethinking Transportation 2020–2030 and 2020's Rethinking Energy 2020-2030. It claims to have identified a flaw in the energy industry's method of calculating the Levelized Cost Of Energy (LCOE) for traditional generation modes such as coal, nuclear and gas, in that their analysis assumes that the capacity factor is constant, and claims that this flaw has caused systematic overinvestment in the world's conventional energy sources while causing systematic underinvestment in alternative energy sources such as solar+battery. This report was cited in news stories from around the world.

== Rethinking Food and Agriculture 2020–2030 ==
The thesis of Rethinking Food and Agriculture is that, by 2030, a convergence of exponentially-improving factors will make manufactured protein "five times cheaper by 2030 and 10 times cheaper by 2035 than existing animal proteins, before ultimately approaching the cost of sugar. They will also be superior in every key attribute—more nutritious, healthier, better tasting, and more convenient, with almost unimaginable variety. This means that, by 2030, modern food products will be higher quality and cost less than half as much to produce as the animal-derived products they replace."

These factors driving this result are listed as:

- Precision fermentation, "a process that allows us to program microorganisms to produce almost any complex organic molecule."
- Food-as-Software, "an entirely new model of production…in which individual molecules engineered by scientists are uploaded to databases – molecular cookbooks that food engineers anywhere in the world can use to design products in the same way that software developers design apps."

RethinkX's predictions for the disruption of protein by precision fermentation include:

- By 2030, the number of cows in the U.S. will have fallen by 50% and demand for cow products will have fallen by 70%, bankrupting the U.S. cattle industry. By 2035, demand for cow products will have shrunk by 80% to 90%.
- Other livestock markets will follow a similar trajectory.
- The dairy industry will collapse even faster, because its most valuable commercial output is not milk but unstructured milk powders, which are easily replaced by the outputs of precision fermentation.
- US farmland values will collapse by 40%-80% as the need for livestock feed declines.

As with RethinkX's previous report on energy and transportation, critics' primary objection was that the disruption would take longer, and be less complete, than RethinkX had predicted.

Other critics argued that RethinkX's motivations were tainted by greed. North Dakota State University livestock economist Tim Petry noted in the Australian beef industry magazine Beef Central that RethinkX's report "was written by Silicon Valley hi-tech people who want to lure billionaire investors to invest in their companies. That's the case with anything. When you have something very dramatic, it's easier to get it in the papers than a report that says meat production is going to increase 1pc a year". A spokesman for the US's National Milk Producers Federation told FoodNavigator that "This report would have you believe that in 11 short years we will be living in The Jetsons, with consumers massively adopting industrially-developed, untested food-like products on their way to vegan fantasyland." Philosophy professor Martin Cohen and food science professor Frédéric Leroy noted "We should recall Marx's warnings against allowing the interests of corporations and private profit to decide what we should eat".

== Rethinking Humanity ==
The thesis of Rethinking Humanity is that, first, the Seba Technology Disruption Framework could be extended to explain disruptions of society as a whole because "the same processes and dynamics that drive S-curve adoption of new products at a sector level repeat at the level of civilizations," and that, second, human civilization was now "on the cusp of the fastest, deepest, most consequential transformation of human civilization in history, a transformation every bit as significant as the move from foraging to cities and agriculture 10,000 years ago."

Rethinking Humanity asserts that each of the five "foundational sectors" that underpin the global economy—information, energy, food, transportation, and materials—"will be disrupted in the period 2020–2033, costs will fall by 10x or more, while production processes an order of magnitude (10x) more efficient will use 90% fewer natural resources with 10x-100x less waste." It further asserts that these technological disruptions have the potential to disrupt human civilization, for good or ill, and that humanity must develop a new social, political, and economic "Organizing System" to ensure that the outcome of this disruption is "A New Age of Freedom."

The publication of Rethinking Humanity in June 2020 prompted less global press coverage than its previous reports.

The criticisms of Rethinking Humanity were similar to those leveled at RethinkX's previous reports.
