= Blue carbon =

Carbon stored in coastal and marine ecosystems

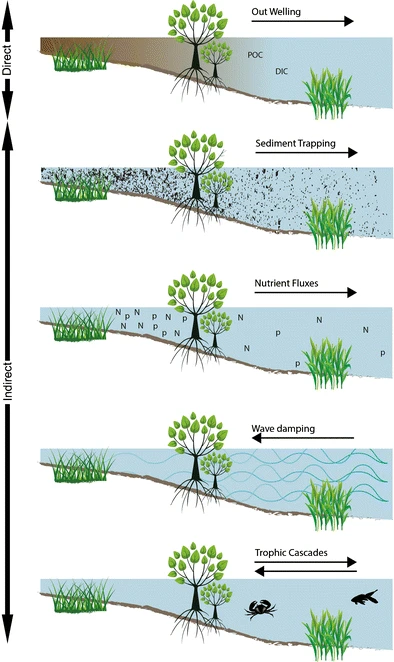
Ways one blue carbon habitat can influence the carbon concentration and future carbon sequestration in an adjacent blue carbon habitat

Blue carbon is a concept within climate change mitigation that refers to "biologically driven carbon fluxes and storage in marine systems that are amenable to management". Most commonly, it refers to the role that tidal marshes, mangroves and seagrass meadows can play in carbon sequestration. Whether macroalgae (seaweeds) can be considered blue carbon ecosystems remains contentious. These ecosystems can play an important role for climate change mitigation and ecosystem-based adaptation. However, when blue carbon ecosystems are degraded or lost, they release carbon back to the atmosphere, thereby adding to greenhouse gas emissions.

The methods for blue carbon management fall into the category of "ocean-based biological carbon dioxide removal (CDR) methods". They are a type of biological carbon fixation.

Scientists are looking for ways to further develop the blue carbon potential of ecosystems. However, the long-term effectiveness of blue carbon as a carbon dioxide removal solution is under debate.

The term deep blue carbon is also in use and refers to storing carbon in the deep ocean waters.

== Definition ==
Blue carbon is defined by the IPCC as "Biologically driven carbon fluxes and storage in marine systems that are amenable to management."

Another definition states: "Blue carbon refers to organic carbon that is captured and stored by the oceans and coastal ecosystems, particularly by vegetated coastal ecosystems: seagrass meadows, tidal marshes, and mangrove forests."

Coastal blue carbon focuses on "rooted vegetation in the coastal zone, such as tidal marshes, mangroves and seagrasses". Seagrass, salt marshes and mangroves are sometimes referred to as "blue forests" in contrast to land-based "green forests".

Deep blue carbon is located in the high seas beyond national jurisdictions. It includes carbon contained in "continental shelf waters, deep-sea waters and the sea floor beneath them" and makes up 90% of all ocean carbon. Deep blue carbon is generally seen as "less amenable to management" and challenging due to lack of data "relating to the permanence of their carbon stores".

== Role in climate change context ==
The term blue carbon was coined in 2009. At the time, the term was coined to highlight that coastal vegetated ecosystems have a disproportionately large contribution to global carbon sequestration. Others use the term to describe the carbon captured by the entire ocean, not just the coastal ecosystems. The role of blue carbon in climate change mitigation and adaptation has now reached international prominence.

The vegetated coastal ecosystems of tidal marshes, mangroves and seagrasses (which are grouped as "blue carbon") have high carbon burial rates. This is because they accumulate carbon in their soils and sediments.

Such ecosystems can contribute to climate change mitigation and also to ecosystem-based adaptation. However, when coastal blue carbon ecosystems are degraded or lost they release carbon back to the atmosphere.

Mangroves, salt marshes and seagrasses can store carbon and are highly efficient carbon sinks. They capture CO_{2} from the atmosphere by sequestering the carbon in their underlying sediments, in underground and below-ground biomass, and in dead biomass.

Although vegetated coastal ecosystems cover less area and have less aboveground biomass than terrestrial plants they have the potential to impact long term C sequestration, particularly in sediment sinks.

One of the main concerns with blue carbon is that the rate of loss of these important marine ecosystems is much higher than any other ecosystem on the planet, even compared to rainforests. Current estimates suggest a loss of 2–7% per year, which is not only lost carbon sequestration, but also lost habitat that is important for managing climate, coastal protection, and health.

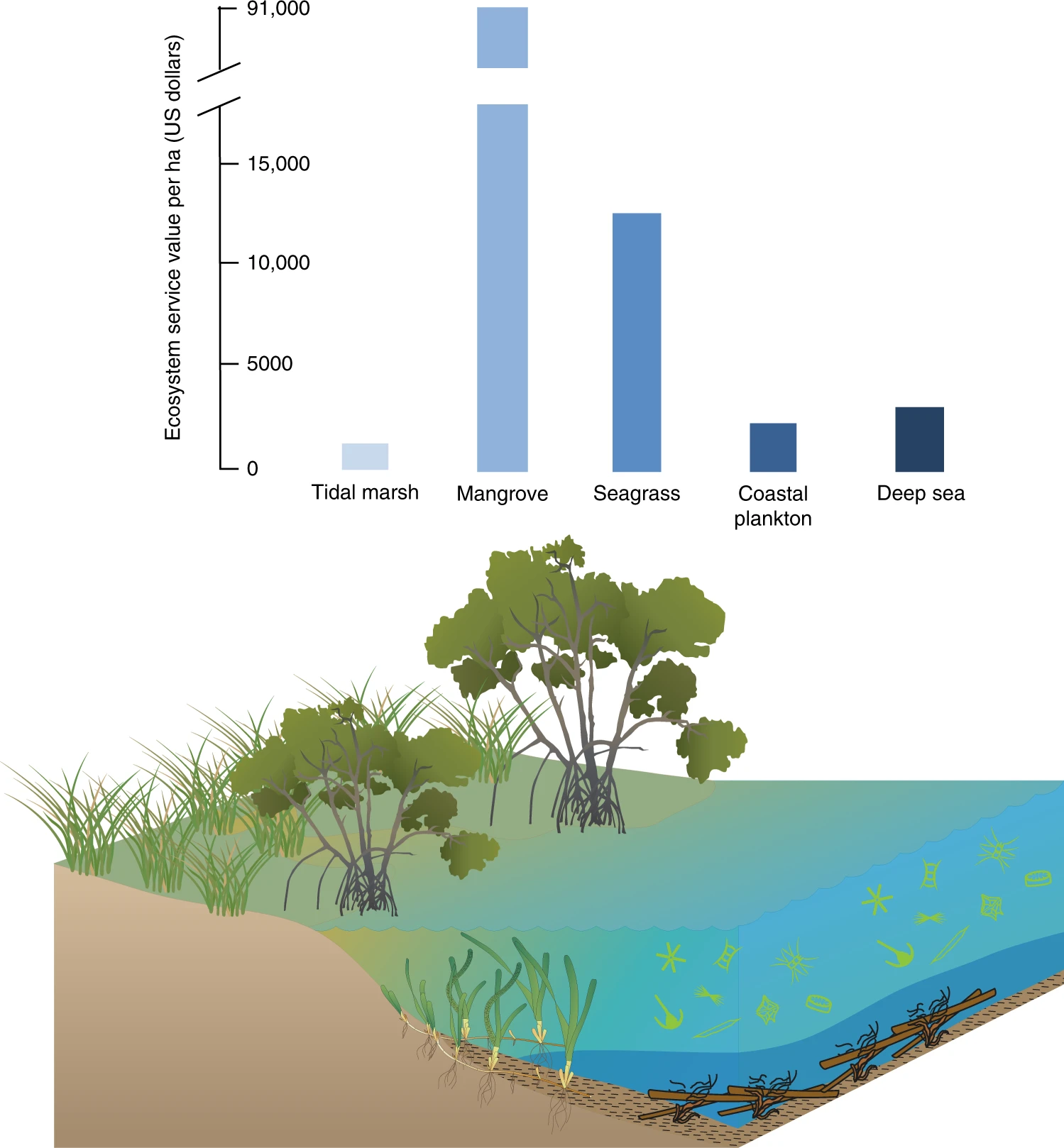
Estimates of the economic value of blue carbon ecosystems per hectare. Based on 2009 data from UNEP/GRID-Arendal.

As blue carbon ecosystems that sequester carbon are degraded or destroyed, the carbon once stored in these ecosystems is susceptible to being released into the atmosphere, continuing the current accelerated rate of climate change. Declines in vegetated coastal habitats are seen worldwide.

Quantifying rates of decrease are difficult to calculate, however measurements have been estimated by researchers indicating that if blue carbon ecosystems continue to decline, for any number of reasons, 30–40% of tidal marshes and seagrasses and approximately 100% of mangroves could be gone in the next century.

Reasons for the decline of mangroves, seagrass, and marshes include land use changes, climate and drought related effects, dams built in the watershed, convergence to aquaculture and agriculture, land development and sea-level rise due to climate change. Increases in these activities can lead to significant decreases in habitat availability and thus increases in released C from sediments.

As anthropogenic effects and climate change are heightened, the effectiveness of blue carbon sinks will diminish and CO_{2} emissions will be further increased. Data on the rates at which CO_{2} is being released into the atmosphere is not robust currently; however, research is being conducted to gather better information to analyze trends. Loss of underground biomass (roots and rhizomes) will allow for CO_{2} to be emitted changing these habitats into sources rather than carbon sinks.

=== Impacts of nutrient load ===
Increases in carbon capture and sequestration have been observed in both mangrove and seagrass ecosystems which have been subjected to high nutrient loads, either intentionally or due to waste from human activities.

Research done on mangrove soils from the Red Sea have shown that increases in nutrient loads to these soils do not increase carbon mineralization and subsequent CO_{2} release. This neutral effect of fertilization was not found to be true in all mangrove forest types. Carbon capture rates also increased in these forests due to increased growth rates of the mangroves. In forests with increases in respiration there were also increases in mangrove growth of up to six times the normal rate.

== Carbon storage by type of biome ==
=== Tidal marshes ===
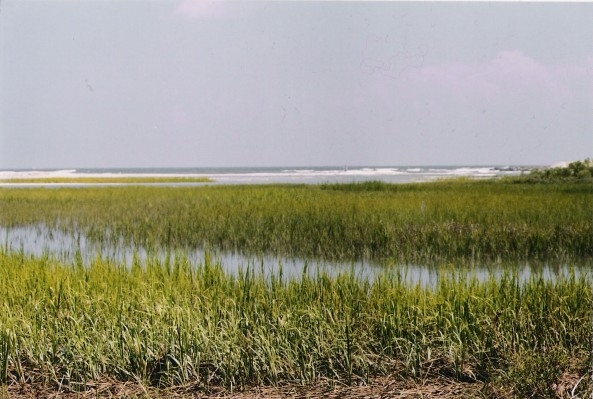
Tidal marsh

Tidal marshes can be found globally on coastlines from the arctic to the subtropics. They are intertidal ecosystems dominated by herbaceous vegetation. In the tropics, marshes are replaced by mangroves as the dominant coastal vegetation.

Marshes have high productivity, with a large portion of primary production in belowground biomass. This belowground biomass can form deposits up to 8m deep. Marshes provide valuable habitat for plants, birds, and juvenile fish, protect coastal habitat from storm surge and flooding, and can reduce nutrient loading to coastal waters. Similarly to mangrove and seagrass habitats, marshes also serve as important carbon sinks. Marshes sequester C in underground biomass due to high rates of organic sedimentation and anaerobic-dominated decomposition. Salt marshes cover approximately 22,000 to 400,000 km^{2} globally, with an estimated carbon burial rate of 210 g C m^{−2} yr^{−1}.

Salt marshes may not be expansive worldwide in relation to forests, but they have a C burial rate that is over 50 times faster than tropical rainforests. Rates of burial have been estimated at up to 87.2 ± 9.6 Tg C yr^{−1} which is greater than that of tropical rainforests, 53 ± 9.6 Tg C yr^{−1}. Since the 1800s salt marshes have been disturbed due to development and a lack of understanding of their importance. The 25% decline since that time has led to a decrease in potential C sink area coupled with the release of once buried C. Consequences of increasingly degraded marsh habitat are a decrease in C stock in sediments, a decrease in plant biomass and thus a decrease in photosynthesis reducing the amount of CO_{2} taken up by the plants, failure of C in plant blades to be transferred into the sediment, possible acceleration of erosive processes due to the lack of plant biomass, and acceleration of buried C release to the atmosphere.

Tidal marshes have been impacted by humans for centuries, including modification for grazing, haymaking, reclamation for agriculture, development and ports, evaporation ponds for salt production, modification for aquaculture, insect control, tidal power and flood protection. Marshes are also susceptible to pollution from oil, industrial chemicals, and most commonly, eutrophication. Introduced species, sea-level rise, river damming and decreased sedimentation are additional longterm changes that affect marsh habitat, and in turn, may affect carbon sequestration potential.

=== Mangroves ===
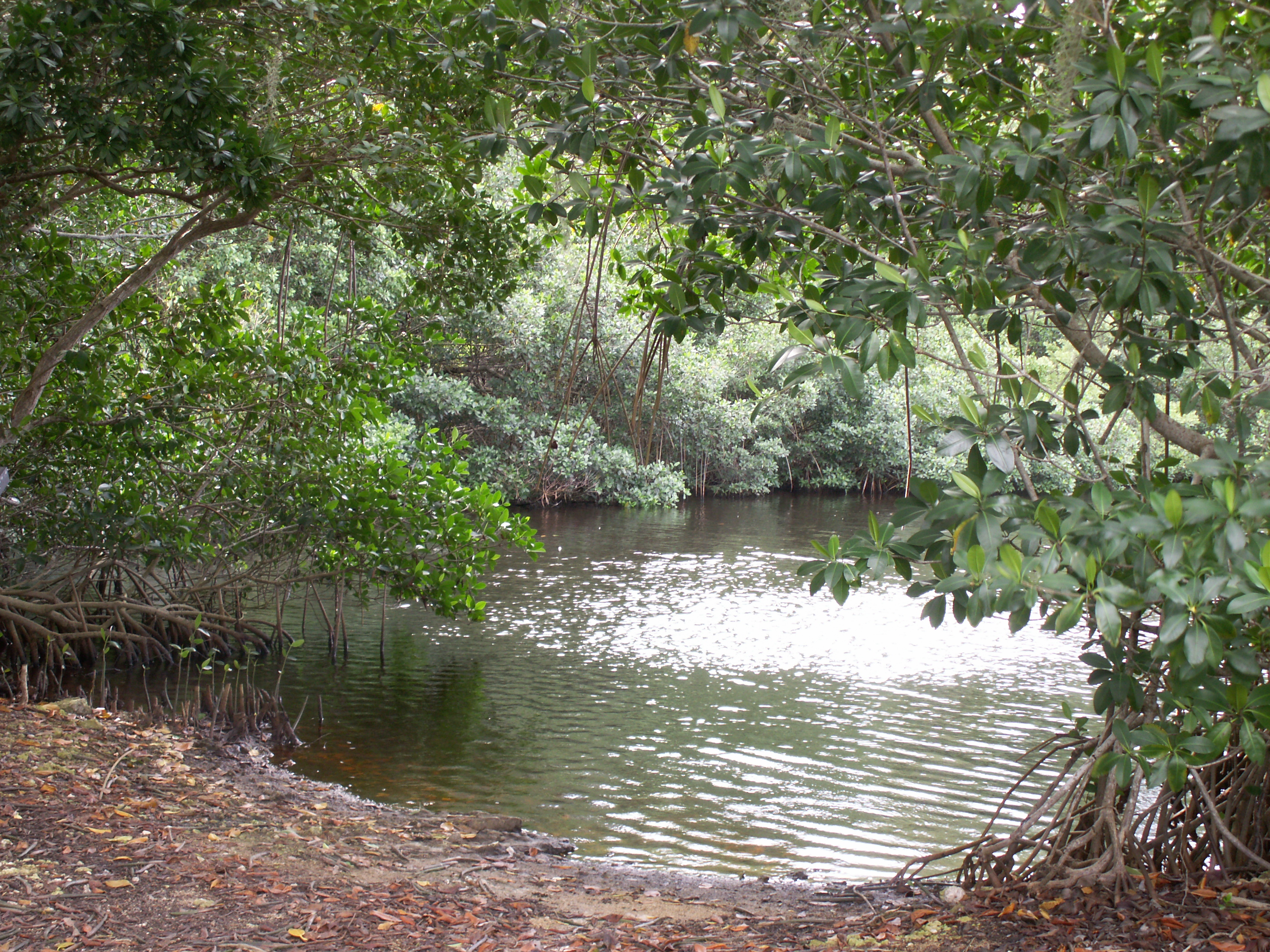
Mangrove forest

Globally, mangroves stored 4.19 ± 0.62 Pg (CI 95%) of carbon in 2012, with Indonesia, Brazil, Malaysia and Papua New Guinea accounting for more than 50% of the global stock. 2.96 ± 0.53 Pg of the global carbon stock is contained within the soil and 1.23 ± 0.06 Pg in the living biomass. Of this 1.23 Pg, approximately 0.41 ± 0.02 Pg is in the belowground biomass in the root system and approximately 0.82 ± 0.04 Pg is in the aboveground living biomass.

Global mangrove canopy cover is estimated as between 83,495 km^{2} and 167,387 km^{2} in 2012 with Indonesia containing approximately 30% of the entire global mangrove forest area. Mangrove forests are responsible for approximately 10% of global carbon burial, with an estimated carbon burial rate of 174 g C m^{−2} yr^{−1}.

Mangroves, like seagrasses, have potential for high levels of carbon sequestration. They account for 3% of the global carbon sequestration by tropical forests and 14% of the global coastal ocean's carbon burial.

A 2023 global meta-analysis of more than 370 restoration sites found that mangrove reforestation (restoring former mangrove areas) stores ~60% more carbon per hectare over the first 40 years than afforestation (planting on non-mangrove tidal flats), mainly due to greater sediment carbon accumulation; the authors estimate that reforesting all physically feasible deforested areas could sequester ~672–689 Tg CO₂-eq over 40 years.

Mangroves are naturally disturbed by floods, tsunamis, coastal storms like cyclones and hurricanes, lightning, disease and pests, and changes in water quality or temperature. Although they are resilient to many of these natural disturbances, they are highly susceptible to human impacts including urban development, aquaculture, mining, and overexploitation of shellfish, crustaceans, fish and timber. Mangroves provide globally important ecosystem services and carbon sequestration and are thus an important habitat to conserve and repair when possible.

Dams threaten habitats by slowing the amount of freshwater reaching mangroves. Coral reef destruction also plays a role in mangrove habitat health as reefs slow wave energy to a level that mangroves are more tolerant of.

=== Seagrass meadows ===
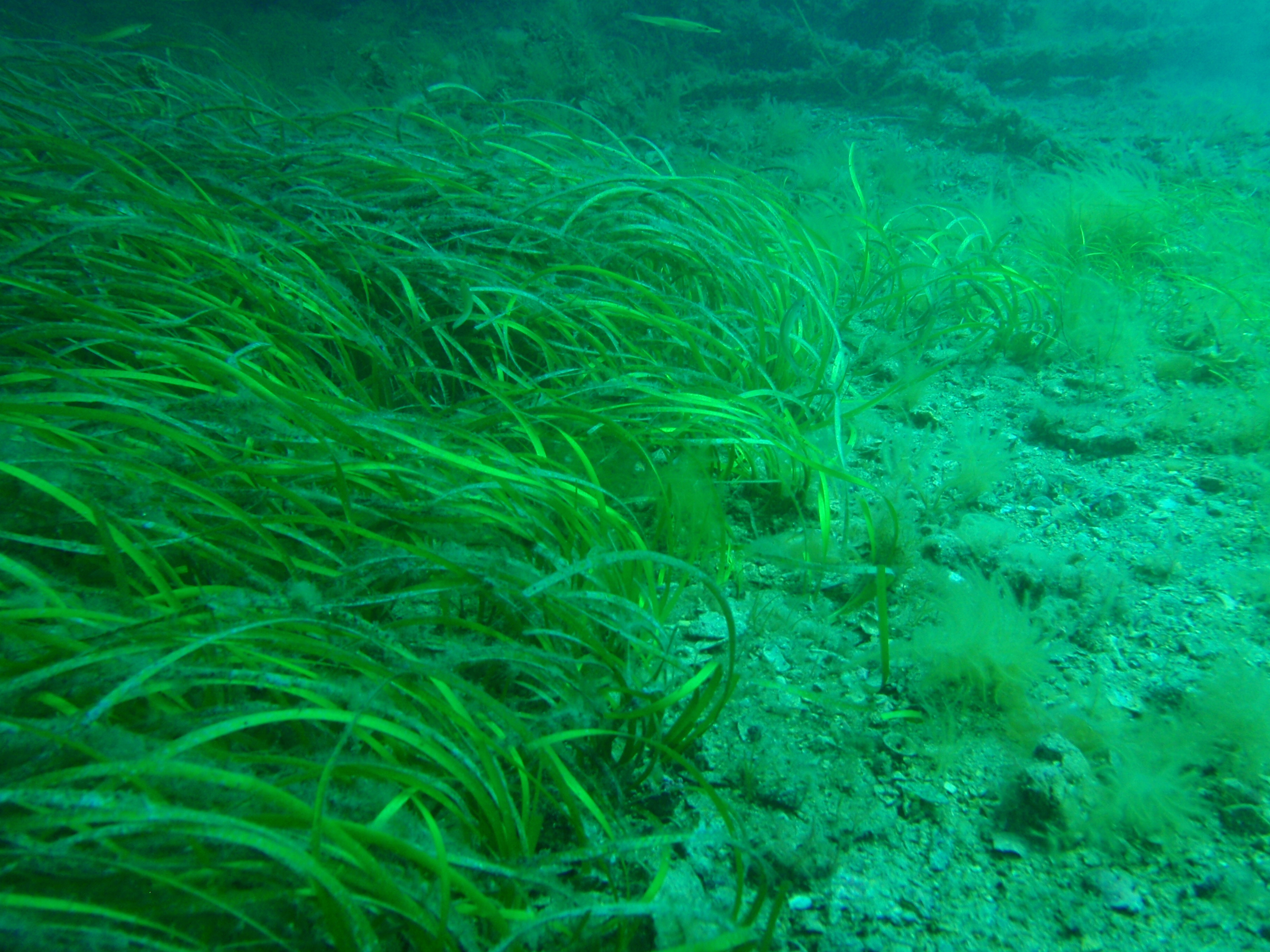
Seagrass meadow

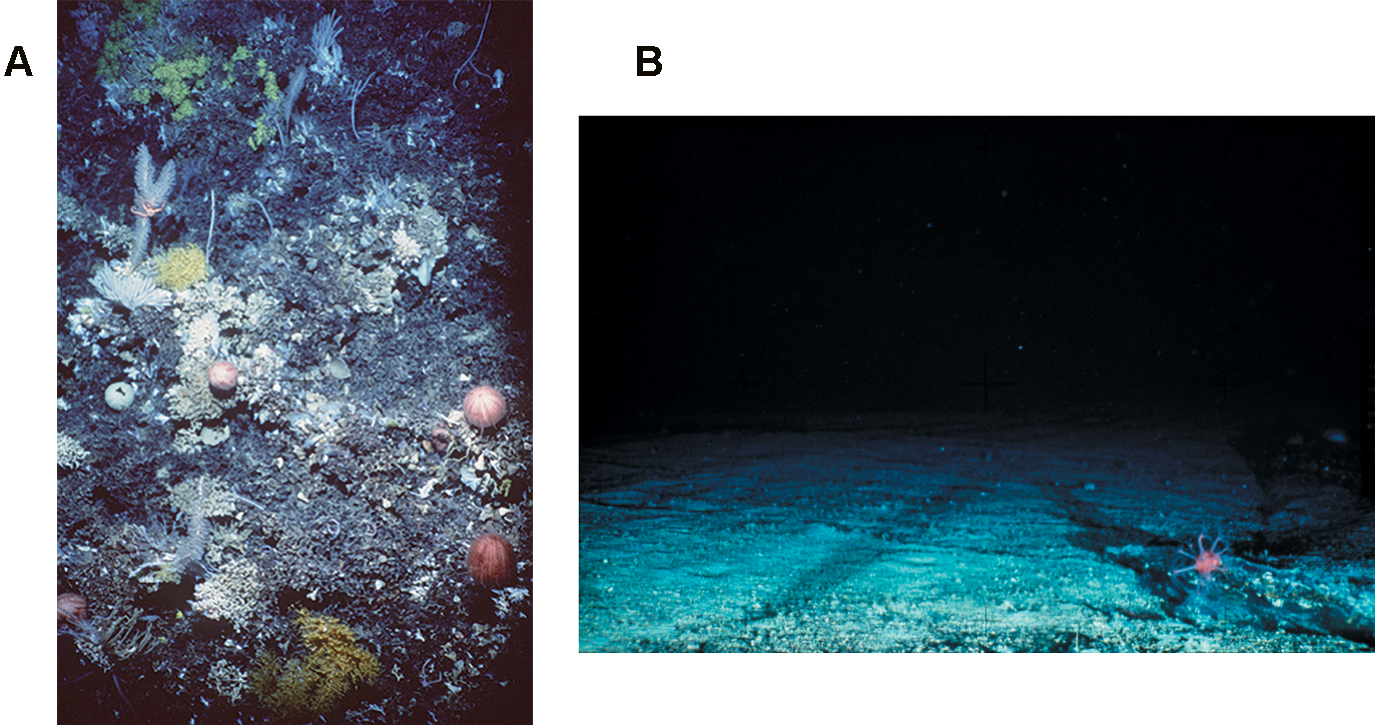
(A) untrawled seamount and (B) a trawled seamount. Bottom trawling has destroyed many coastal habitats.

Although seagrass makes up only 0.1% of the area of the ocean floor, it accounts for approximately 10–18% of the total oceanic carbon burial. Currently global seagrass meadows are estimated to store as much as 19.9 Pg (gigaton, or billion tons) of organic carbon. There has been considerable attention to how large-scale seaweed cultivation in the open ocean can act as a form of carbon sequestration. Studies have demonstrated that nearshore seaweed forests constitute a source of blue carbon, as seaweed detritus is carried by wave currents into the middle and deep ocean thereby sequestering carbon.

Carbon primarily accumulates in marine sediments, which are anoxic and thus continually preserve organic carbon from decadal-millennial time scales. High accumulation rates, low oxygen, low sediment conductivity and slower microbial decomposition rates all encourage carbon burial and carbon accumulation in these coastal sediments.

Compared to terrestrial habitats that lose carbon stocks as CO_{2} during decomposition or by disturbances like fires or deforestation, marine carbon sinks can retain C for much longer time periods. Carbon sequestration rates in seagrass meadows vary depending on the species, characteristics of the sediment, and depth of the habitats, but on average the carbon burial rate is approximately 138 g C m^{−2} yr^{−1}.

Seagrass habitats are threatened by coastal eutrophication, increased seawater temperatures, increased sedimentation and coastal development, and sea level rise which may decrease light availability for photosynthesis. Seagrass loss has accelerated over the past few decades, from 0.9% per year prior to 1940 to 7% per year in 1990, with about 1/3 of global loss since WWII. The decline in seagrasses is due to a number of factors including drought, water quality issues, agricultural practices, invasive species, pathogens, fishing and climate change.

Scientists encourage the protection and continued research of these ecosystems for organic carbon storage, valuable habitat and other ecosystem services.

Restored seagrass meadows were found to start sequestering carbon in sediment within about four years. This was the time needed for the meadow to reach sufficient shoot density to cause sediment deposition.

=== Deep ocean ===
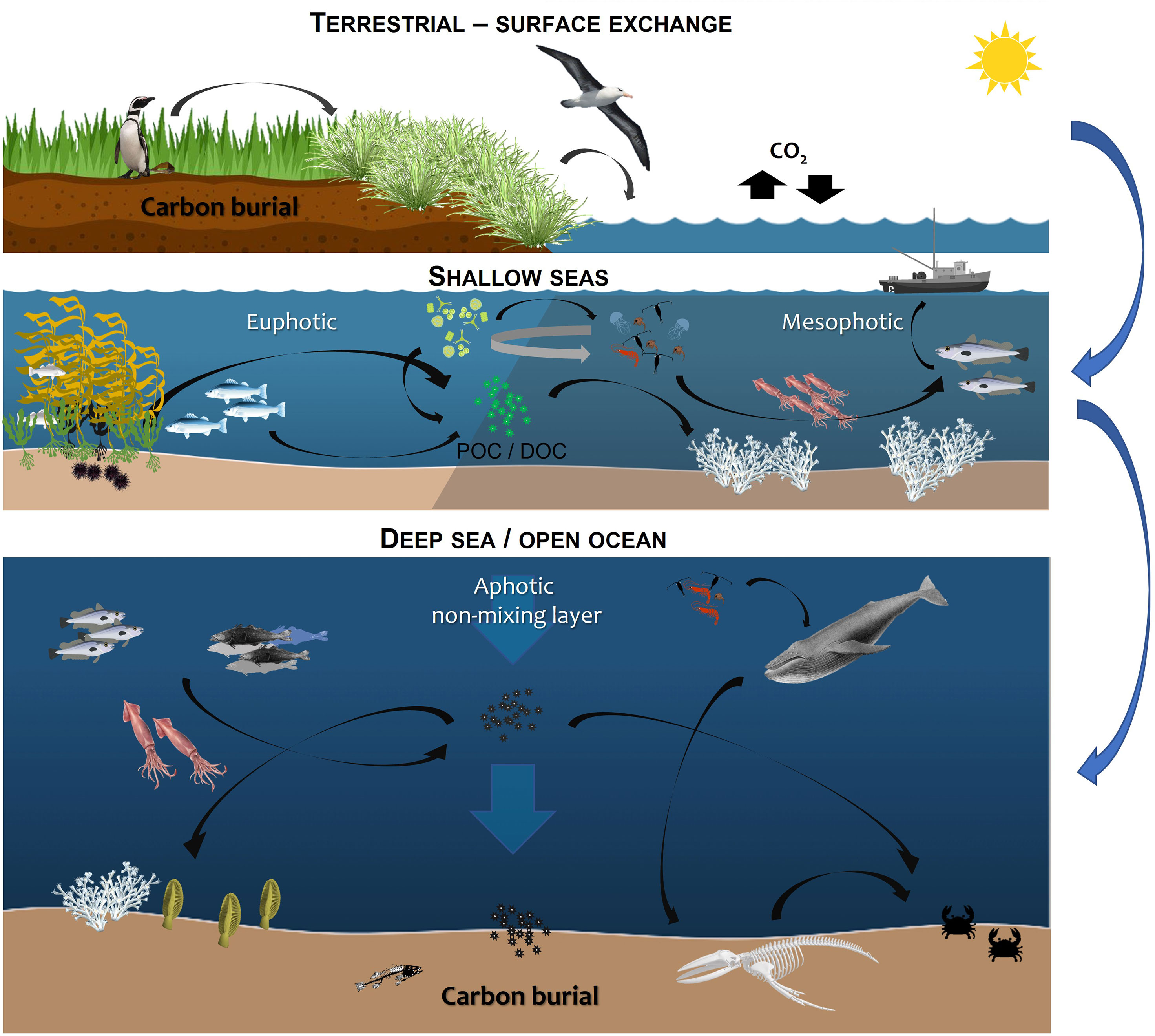
Blue carbon at coastal, medium and deep ocean levels

The deeper layers of the ocean are greatly unsaturated in CO_{2} and its dissolved forms, carbonic and bicarbonic acid, and their salts. At depths greater than 3 km, CO_{2} becomes liquefied and sinks to the seafloor due to it being higher density than the surrounding seawater. Mathematical models have shown that CO_{2} stored in deep sea sediments beyond 3 km could provide permanent geological storage even with large geomechanical perturbations. Deep ocean storage can present a potential sink for large amounts of anthropogenic CO_{2}. Other deep water carbon storage techniques currently being explored include, seaweed farming and algae, ocean fertilization, artificial upwelling, and basalt storage.

The deep blue carbon terminology has been used in passing as early as 2017. The Ocean Frontier Institute has made it a centrepiece of their participation at COP27. It is investing significant resources into deep blue carbon research. In terms of net-new-carbon sequestration deep blue carbon offers an estimated 10–20 times higher potential than coastal blue carbon to achieve net-zero goals. There is still a lack of data in this area along with financial, ecological and environmental concerns. Advancements in research and technical capabilities are raising international interest in this kind of storage.

=== Macroalgae (seaweed) ===
Macroalgae/seaweed forests are strong candidate blue carbon ecosystems due to their high rates of productivity (i.e., carbon production) and extensive coverage of coastal ecosystems worldwide. An influential report published in 2016 estimated that macroalgae could sequester 173 TgC per year globally (estimate range 61-268 TgC per year), which is comparable to the rate of carbon sequestration of other coastal vegetated ecosystems. However, this estimate comes with a large degree of uncertainty and much more research is needed to understand the true quantity of carbon sequestered by macroalgae, and whether macroalgal carbon sequestration can meaningfully contribute to climate change mitigtion remains unknown.

Macroalgal-derived carbon can be sequestered via three main mechanisms: first, macroalgal carbon can be exported to and buried in nearby soft sediments, second, macroalgal carbon can be exported to the very deep ocean, or third, macroalgal-produced dissolved organic carbon (DOC) could resist degradation for timescales relevant to climate change mitigation. Estimating carbon fluxes across these pathways involves tracing macroalgal-derived carbon as it moves through the ocean, and proving that macroalgal-derived carbon persists in an organic form for hundreds of years. Understanding these movement patterns and tracking the ultimate fate of macroalgal carbon is extremely logistically challenging. Thus, we currently lack precise estimates of the carbon sequestration capacity of macrolagal forests.

Similar to other coastal vegetated ecosystems, macroalgal forests (including kelp forests) are under threat worldwide and macroalgal forest cover is declining in many regions due to a myriad of factors including ocean warming, eutrophication, increased sedimentation, epiphytism, and over-grazing by herbivores. Furthermore, research suggests that ocean warming will limit the carbon sequestration capacity of macroalgae.

== Example projects ==
- Microsoft and Running Tide signed Two-Year agreement in 2023 to remove up to 12,000 tons of carbon through an ocean-based carbon removal system.
- In Canada, a North Atlantic Carbon Observatory (NACO) project is underway to establish an accurate measurement of the ocean's ability to continue to absorb carbon with particular emphasis on deep blue capacity.
- In Denmark, the "Greensand" project is underway to capture carbon at source and deposit it in the deep blue regions of the North Sea, creating a 'CO_{2} graveyard'. The project is expected to store up to eight million tonnes of CO_{2} per year by 2030.
- A restoration project in South Australia will cover 2,000 ha (4,900 acres) of mangroves, salt marsh and sea grasses extending 700 km (430 mi) in the St Vincents Gulf and Spencer Gulf in South Australia. The project will also look at various possibilities of insuring the huge expanse of existing blue carbon ecosystems.
- In South Korea, macroalgae have been utilized as part of a climate change mitigation program. The country has established the Coastal CO_{2} Removal Belt (CCRB) which is composed of artificial and natural ecosystems. The goal is to capture carbon using large areas of kelp forest.
- Marine permaculture also fixes carbon in seaweed forest projects offshore in Tasmania and the Philippines, with potential use from the tropics to temperate oceans.

== See also ==
- Ocean Data Viewer: contains datasets on worldwide sea grasses, mangroves and salt marshes
- UN Decade for Ocean Science for Sustainable Development
- UN Decade on Ecosystem Restoration
