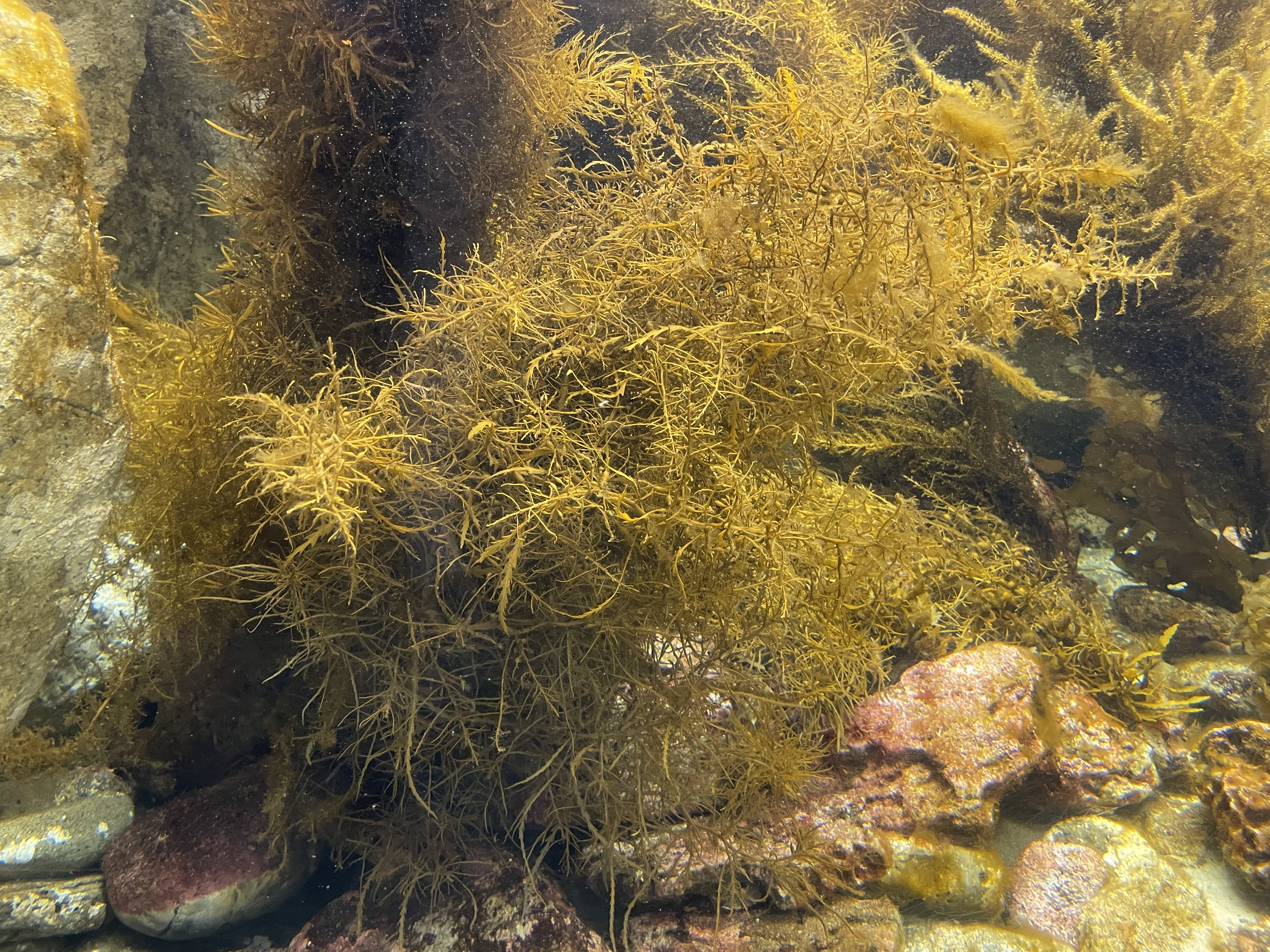

Scientific classification
- Domain: Eukaryota
- Clade: Sar
- Clade: Stramenopiles
- Division: Ochrophyta
- Class: Phaeophyceae
- Order: Fucales
- Family: Sargassaceae
- Genus: Sargassum
- Species: S. horneri

Binomial name
- Sargassum horneri (Turner) C.Agardh 1820

= Sargassum horneri =

Species of seaweed

Sargassum horneri is a species of brown macroalgae that is common along the coast of Japan and Korea. It is an annual algae which has a varying fertile season along the coast. In Wakasa Bay, Japan it begins to grow in early autumn through winter and matures in spring, when the sea water temperature is around 11.6–15.2 °C (53–59 °F). Also called "devil weed", S. horneri has invaded the Eastern Pacific, beginning in Baja California and advancing north along the California coastline.

In its natural ecosystem, Sargassum horneri grows attached to a hard substrate and blooms into a kelp forest which encourages and maintains local biodiversity. However, this species of macroalgae is the major component of the northwest Pacific golden tide, a biomass of Sargassum horneri that drifts up the eastern coast of China towards Korea as an invasive species and is detrimental to the coastal ecosystem there.

== Taxonomy and etymology ==
S. horneri was first described in 1808 by Dawson Turner under the basionym Fucus horneri. It was later reclassified into the genus Sargassum by Carl Adolph Agardh in 1820.

The specific epithet horneri was given in honor of Dr. Horner, an astronomer and naturalist aboard the first Russian circumnavigation of the globe, which took place from 1803 to 1806 under Captain Adam von Krusenstern.
