= Aquaculture in the Philippines =

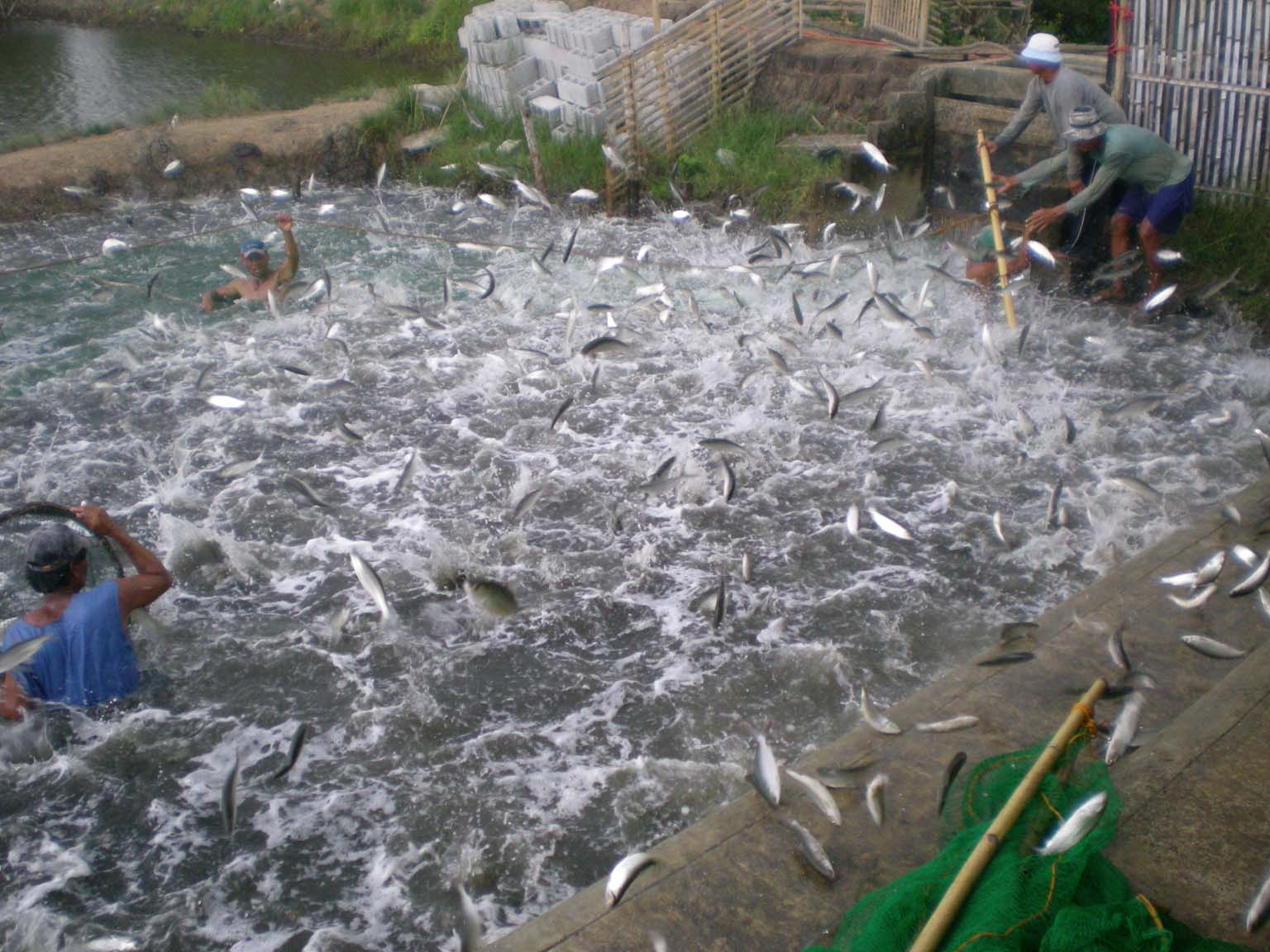
A fish pond in Ivisan

Aquaculture makes up a substantial proportion of the overall output of Philippine fisheries. It has a long history in the archipelago, with wild-caught milkfish being farmed in tidally-fed fish ponds for centuries. Modern aquaculture is carried out in freshwater, brackish water, and seawater throughout the country through a variety of methods.

The most prominent farmed commodities are milkfish and tilapia. Tilapia is farmed in freshwater, while milkfish can be farmed anywhere. Other fish species are also farmed, as well as shrimp, crabs, lobsters, and molluscs. Seaweed is mostly farmed to produce carrageenan. Regulation of aquaculture generally falls to the cities and municipalities in which aquaculture farms are located, and public land and water can be rented for aquaculture from the national government.

Aquaculture has made up an increasingly large proportion of fisheries products produced in the Philippines, and there has been considerable research into improving aquacultural output. Philippine output in total makes up 1% of global aquaculture production, and the country is the fourth-largest producer of seaweed. Aquaculture products are sold alongside wild-caught products in ports. Resulting seafood products are often consumed domestically, although some high-value goods are exported.

The aquaculture industry directly employs over 230,000 individuals. While some workers own their output, many are employees of influential landowners. The creation of aquaculture ponds has destroyed large areas of mangroves, and the establishment of aquaculture in water bodies has created friction with capture fisheries. Some species imported for aquaculture have become invasive species, and aquaculture has directly introduced pollution into some ecosystems.

== Resources ==
Philippine water resources
Area	Details	
2,200,000 km^{2} (850,000 sq mi)	Total ocean	
184,600 km^{2} (71,300 sq mi)	Shallow marine water (≤ 200 metres (660 ft) deep)	
106,328 ha (262,740 acres)	Inland waters	Freshwater swamps
137,735 ha (340,350 acres)	Inland waters	Brackish swamps
200,000 ha (490,000 acres)	Inland waters	Lakes
31,000 ha (77,000 acres)	Inland waters	Rivers
19,000 ha (47,000 acres)	Inland waters	Reservoirs

Philippine marine waters include 2,200,000 square kilometres (850,000 sq mi) of ocean surrounding 36,289 kilometres (22,549 mi) of coasts. Inland waters are made up of both brackish and freshwater areas, and include 23 lakes over 100 hectares (250 acres). The Philippine fisheries in these waters include a large aquaculture component, which as of 2022 produced 54.15% of total fisheries volume.

Aquaculture is carried out in fresh, brackish, and marine water. Philippine waters are highly productive due to large amounts of sunlight, and stable and warm temperatures. Aquaculture generally occurs in areas under local government (city and municipal) jurisdiction, which includes their land area and the sea up to 15 kilometres (9.3 mi) from their shoreline. Aquaculture infrastructure can be built on land, in inland waters, or in coastal and nearshore areas.

Most brackish fish ponds are developed from mangrove areas, with agricultural land being too valuable to convert to fish ponds. Exceptions have occurred during conducive economic conditions, such as in the 1980s when sugarcane plantations were converted to shrimp ponds in Negros Occidental, amid a global slump in sugar prices and increasing shrimp prices. Coastal aquaculture ponds are commonly used to rear shrimp and milkfish. Different species have different ideal habitat conditions for successful rearing. In total, there are 253,323 hectares (625,970 acres) of fish ponds, of which 239,323 hectares (591,380 acres) are brackish and 14,531 hectares (35,910 acres) freshwater.

=== Products farmed ===
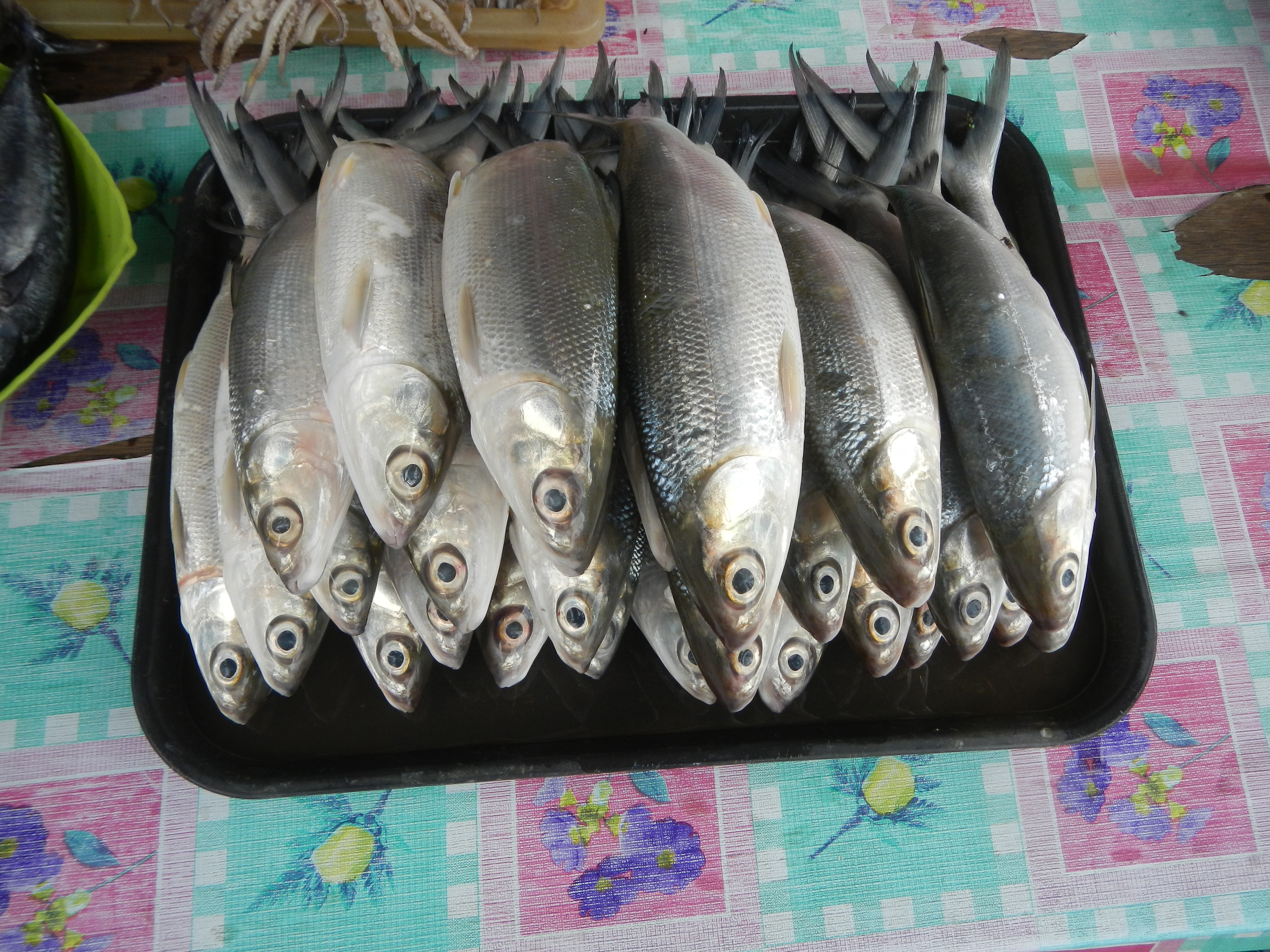
Milkfish have been farmed in the Philippines for centuries

Overall, the top five commodities are milkfish, tilapia, jumbo tiger shrimp, seaweed, and mudcrab. The main two fish commodities are milkfish and tilapia (mainly the Nile tilapia, followed by the Mozambique tilapia). Fish farmed to a lesser extent include carps (notably Bighead carp, as well as some Eurasian carp), catfish (Clarias species such as the walking catfish and Clarias gariepinus, as well as Pangasius species), the mudfish Channa striata, the giant gourami, barramundi, Epinephelus grouper species, rabbitfish (orange-spotted spinefoot and vermiculated spinefoot), and the Scatophagus argus spadefish.

The rabbitfish orange-spotted spinefoot and vermiculated spinefoot, as well as Scatophagus argus, have been farmed sporadically in Pangasinan and elsewhere. Barramundi is only desired in the Western Visayas, which combined with high costs has inhibited successful farming. Low-level Epinephelus farming, while expensive, is more successful due to high demand in Chinese restaurants. It is farmed in Capiz, where tilapia is sometimes used as feed.

The shrimp species farmed include the jumbo tiger shrimp, Indian prawn, Penaeus merguiensis, whiteleg shrimp, Metapenaeus ensis, and the giant freshwater prawn. The jumbo tiger shrimp is a native species, and can be grown in fresh and salty water. The main crabs farmed are the mudcrabs Scylla serrata and Scylla oceanica. (Note: The Scylla genus has seen various taxonomic revisions, and Scylla oceanica is now usually considered a part of Scylla serrata.) Lobsters farmed include species of the Panulirus genus and the slipper lobster family.

For molluscs, oysters farmed include Crassostrea species, Magallana bilineata, and rock oyster species. Abalone that have been farmed are those of the Haliotis genus, particularly Haliotis asinina. The green mussel Perna viridis is also widely farmed. Less frequent marine aquaculture products include giant clams, nacre (pearl shell), green snails, and Trochus.

Of seaweeds, the farming of carrageenophytes is mainly Eucheuma species such as Eucheuma denticulatum, and Kappaphycus alvarezii. Agarophytes farmed are mostly Gracilaria species and Gracilariopsis balinae. Lastly, Chlorophyceae of the Caulerpa genus such as Caulerpa lentillifera are also farmed.

Tilapia, carp, and catfish are usually farmed in freshwater. Tilapia is farmed in both ponds and cages. Shrimp and crab farming usually takes place in brackish water. Saltwater farms (mariculture) are used to farm seaweed, as well as green mussels. Some fish, such as groupers and rabbitfish, are farmed in both brackish and salt water. Milkfish is farmed in fresh, brackish, and salt water.

== Methods ==
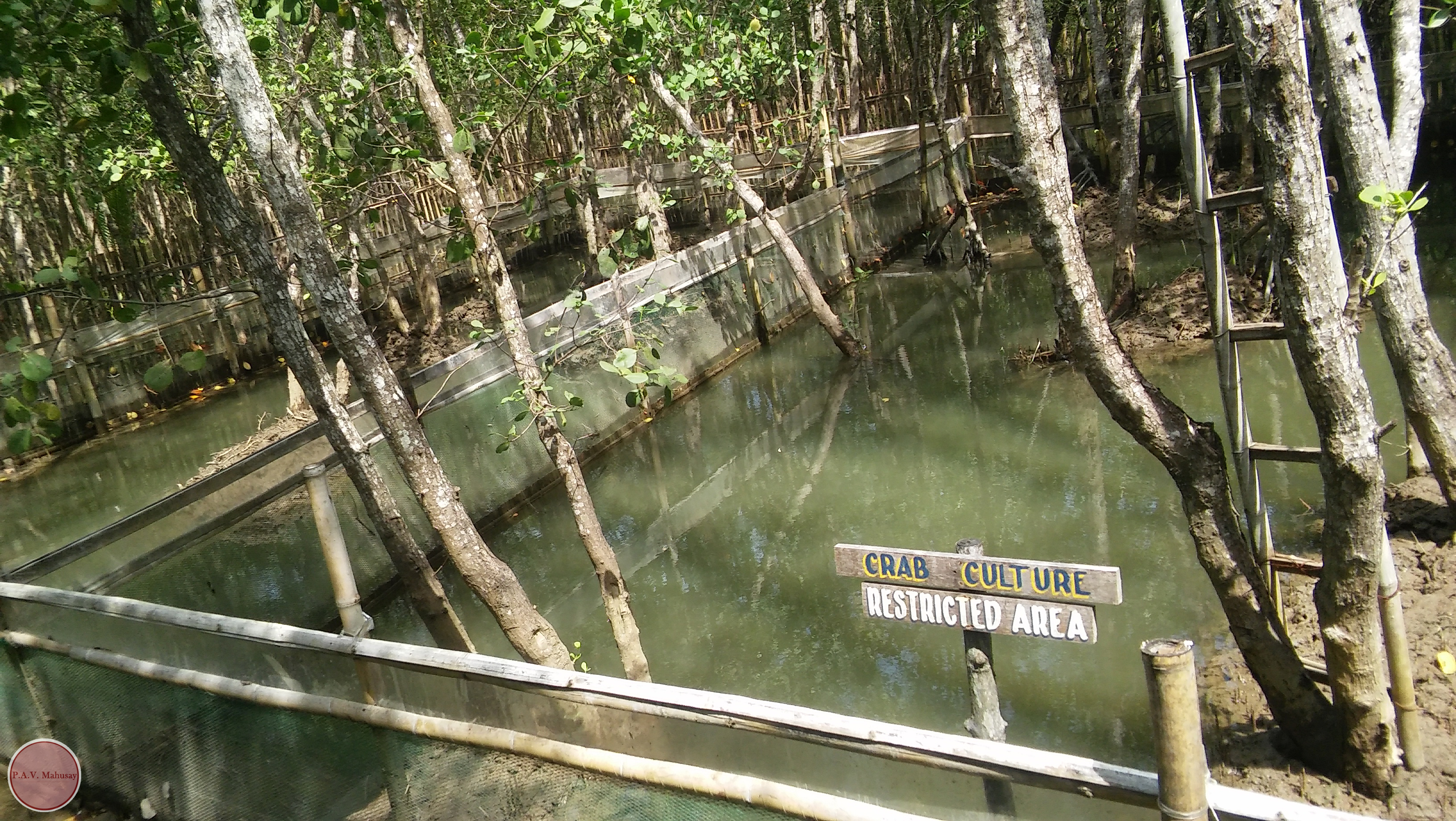
A crab pond in the Bakhawan Eco-Park

Different species are farmed with different levels of technology, ranging from simple ponds with wild-caught fry to more complicated methods of raising genetically modified fish strains. Aquaculture products are grown both from stock hatched in captivity and from wild-caught juveniles. Milkfish can be bred artificially to stock ponds, although many still use wild-caught fry. The orange-spotted spinefoot rabbitfish can be hatched in captivity. Giant freshwater prawn farms rely on seedstock grown in hatcheries or imported. Milkfish aquaculture is thought to use 1.5 billion fry each year. This also requires imports to sustain, with most coming from Indonesia and Taiwan.

=== Fish ponds ===
Fish ponds, especially in brackish water, are the historical method of aquaculture, and remain widespread. Traditionally, these fishponds are tidally supplied with water and food. It has since developed into a multi-pond system, with fish, especially milkfish, shifted between ponds as they grow. The use of supplementary feed has developed from using rice waste to using commercially produced feed, allowing pond farming to become both more productive and less vulnerable to weather changes.

Milkfish farming in brackish fish ponds uses a variety of techniques used in varying intensities. Shrimp, mostly jumbo tiger shrimp, are also farmed in brackish ponds, sometimes on their own, or sometimes together with or in rotation with milkfish. Intensive shrimp production began on Negros and Panay, although it has spread to other areas. Scylla crabs are also taken from these ponds, with bamboo fences used to keep them inside. Some strains of tilapia have been developed which can survive in brackish water, to allow them to also be farmed in the ubiquitous ponds. The presence of tilapia may also improve the quality of shrimp ponds, producing phytoplankton less likely to facilitate the growth of bacteria that cause the luminous vibriosis disease. Rabbitfish and spadefish can also be farmed in brackish and saltwater enclosures, but more slowly than milkfish. Seabass are occasionally farmed in brackish ponds. As rabbitfish are herbivores, they are cheap to feed.

Freshwater ponds are far less common, as they compete for land with other forms of agriculture, and freshwater fish are not as popular. Where they are used, they mostly farm tilapia, which are much easier for individual farmers to breed than milkfish. Tilapia can also grow in some brackish water, although they are usually considered pests in competition with or predating on milkfish and shrimp. There is a history of small amounts of freshwater pond farming of other introduced species. A small amount of rice-fish systems function as freshwater ponds. These are often unsuccessful, as pesticides may harm fish, and rice growing cycles may not align with fish growing cycles.

A 1977 national study found that around 15% of fish ponds were smaller than 1 hectare (2.5 acres), although in total there were less than 1% of all fish pond areas. Over half of fishponds were officially above 5 hectares (12 acres), including 5% which were above 50 hectares (120 acres). In 1979, 70% of fish ponds in Central Luzon were smaller than 0.5 hectares (1.2 acres). However, the largest 2% of fish ponds took up 68% of total fish pond area. Such figures do not account for the area of multiple owners being operated together, or for land being operated by someone who is not the owner. Large brackish fishponds often require multiple workers, and large owners often do not work at the ponds. Of fish ponds being leased from the government, the majority are leased by individuals with addresses in different locations to those of their fish ponds. Almost all freshwater fishponds are privately owned.

Fish pond land can be leased from the government for a minimum of 25 years and a maximum of 50 years under the Fisheries Code of 1998. Private land registered as being used for fish ponds can be most valuable as land in itself, and ponds can thus be underdeveloped. Fish pond productivity can be negatively affected by the El Niño–Southern Oscillation. Diseases such as luminous vibriosis impede shrimp farming, and some diseases have become resistant to antibiotics. Other diseases affecting shrimp farms include white spot syndrome, monodon baculovirus, infectious hypodermal and hematopoietic necrosis, hepatopancreatic parvovirus, yellowhead disease, Taura syndrome, shell disease, infectious myonecrosis, and filamentous bacterial disease.

=== Fish pens and cages ===
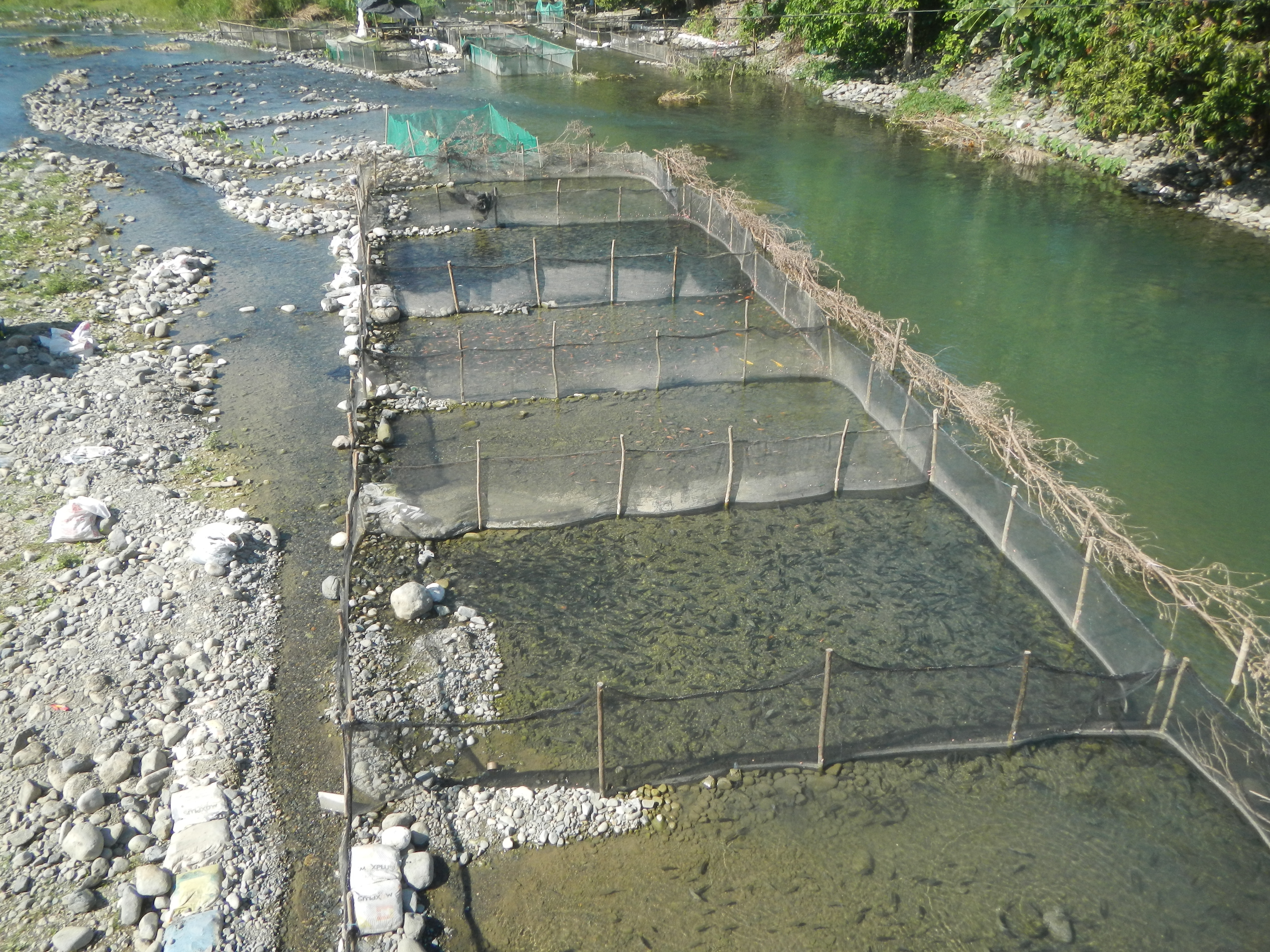
Fish pens in the Bued River

Fish pens are enclosures in which the seabed or lakebed provides the floor. They have high capital costs but can produce large yields even without supplementary feeding. Fish cages are distinguishable from fish pens due to having an artificial bottom. This bottom means fish cages can be small, and are a cheaper alternative to fish pens. These cages can be floating, fixed to the ground, or submerged. Both allow for water to naturally flow through the enclosures. Fish pens can be constructed using bamboo connected with fishing net. They can have high capital costs, that are greatest per unit area for smaller pens. In freshwater areas, they are generally used to farm tilapia, while in marine areas they are often used to farm groupers. Milkfish are farmed in both environments. Different pen sizes are recommended for different species. Fish pens can be damaged by natural disasters, and their operation can be impeded by water hyacinth.

Fish cages require more supplementary feeding and are thus more labor-intensive than fish ponds. However, they have lower capital costs. Simple cages use wire mesh or fishing nets to create an enclosure around all but the top side, supported by bamboo. In shallow waters fish cages are often moored to the ground, floating cages in deeper waters are more expensive to produce. Some fish cages have been imported from abroad, including from Norway and the United States. Some of these can produce 30 tons of milkfish every four or five months. Groupers are raised in marine cages, including wild-caught groupers thought too small to sell. Groupers can be fed tilapia whose growth was stunted by overcrowding. For milkfish, marine cages are more intensive and can produce higher output per unit area than in other locations. Growth rates for caged tilapia vary from four months to a year depending on environmental conditions. In the ocean, circular milkfish cages 19 metres (62 ft) wide and 15 metres (49 ft) deep can produce between 30 and 60 tons in under 150 days, and produce larger individual fish than land-based ponds. Control of milkfish diet allows for the taste of the fish to be assured. Artificial milkfish feed can be as little as around 10% fishmeal. However, large oceanic cages have high capital costs, both for the cages and for effective mooring mechanisms, and are very exposed to natural hazards.

Very low impact pens created in mangrove areas, with some digging where needed to ensure water is present during low tide, can be used to harvest crabs without damaging the mangrove ecosystem. These usually have one crab per square meter, producing 1,400 kilograms (3,100 lb) per 1 hectare (2.5 acres). Fish cages can be owner-operated, but larger sets of fish cages can be owned by an individual who hires caretakers for the cages. In some coastal areas, fish cage cooperatives have been created to manage grouper cultivation as a community.

=== Bivalves ===
The basic method of mussel and oyster farming is the "broadcast" method, where these products are simply farmed off the sea floor, sometimes from naturally existing mussel and oyster beds. This method means there is no conflict with vessels traveling in the area. Most farming is carried out through simple bamboo substrates. Bamboo poles fixed into mussel beds can produce a harvestable crop in six months. These are often 1 metre (3.3 ft) apart, and can be isolated or arranged in a cone around a central pole for stability. More advanced structures suspend substrates for bivalve growth from fishing lines. Rope web substrates have also been used, as have materials such as old tires. The most commonly farmed mussel is the green mussel Perna viridis, which can grow in as little as six months. Harmful algal blooms impact mussel and oyster farming, especially in Manila Bay. Overall, oyster farms are more common, as oysters are more widespread, although mussels are more valuable. Mussel farms are placed in deeper water than oyster farms. For both, farms are usually smaller than 1 hectare (2.5 acres).

Mussel and oyster farming is a small part of overall aquaculture, with limited domestic demand. They are eaten more on special occasions than as daily food items. Farming is often undertaken alongside other jobs, such as fishing. Mussels and oysters are usually sold alive, and their sale is threatened by red tides making their consumption risky. These algal blooms first became an issue in Manila Bay, but have spread to other mussel farming areas. The government monitors water quality, and bans the harvesting and sale of bivalves if measurements breach certain thresholds. In Manila, all bivalve sales are banned during such periods, to prevent products from affected areas being mixed in with unaffected produce. The risk of red tides has led to a reluctance to encourage the development of mussel and oyster farms. While such tides cause human health risks, they do not harm the farmed bivalves. Thus, red tide-related risk is more to do with cash flow for farmers, rather than the total loss of product.

=== Seaweed ===
Seaweed farming is profitable even at a small scale, to the point that the small cost of investment is exceeded by the revenue from the first harvest (105–135 days). Caulerpa and Eucheuma are the most profitable, followed by Gracilaria. Gracilaria grows better in canals with flowing water than in still ponds. Eucheuma is farmed in both shallow water, often on stakes, and in deep water, where it grows on single lines, rafts, and spider web nets. Lines can also be suspended between polystyrene floats in deeper water. Seaweeds are grown 30–40 centimetres (12–16 in) apart on these lines. Sometimes lines are kept within net cages, to keep wild herbivores out. Growth takes two to three months, and most farmers are small-scale. This Eucheuma farming method is used for species such as Eucheuma denticulatum, but also species that were once considered Eucheuma but are now otherwise classified, such as Kappaphycus alvarezii. Caulerpa lentillifera can be grown in milkfish ponds by propagating cuttings separated from each other by 1 metre (3.3 ft). These cuttings gain enough nutrients from pond water changes. In later stages, some fertilizer can be applied by partially submerging sacks of fertilizer above the ponds, hanging like a "teabag". Farming of Gracilaria originally used similar methods to Caulerpa, although it can also be grown in seawater in cages or along nylon lines.

Seaweed farms are often smaller than 1 hectare (2.5 acres), and most are operated by their owners. Even a small farm can be quite profitable. Farmers can obtain new seedstock from each of their harvests, with 100 grams (3.5 oz) of seedstock producing 2,000 grams (71 oz) of final product in three months. Some seaweed farms grow multiple species, providing a more regular yield. More advanced platforms can be sunk during the day and brought to the surface at night, allowing for greater access to nutrients and better resilience to tropical storms. Floating platforms provide additional ecosystem services, such as providing a shelter for juvenile fish.

== Productivity ==
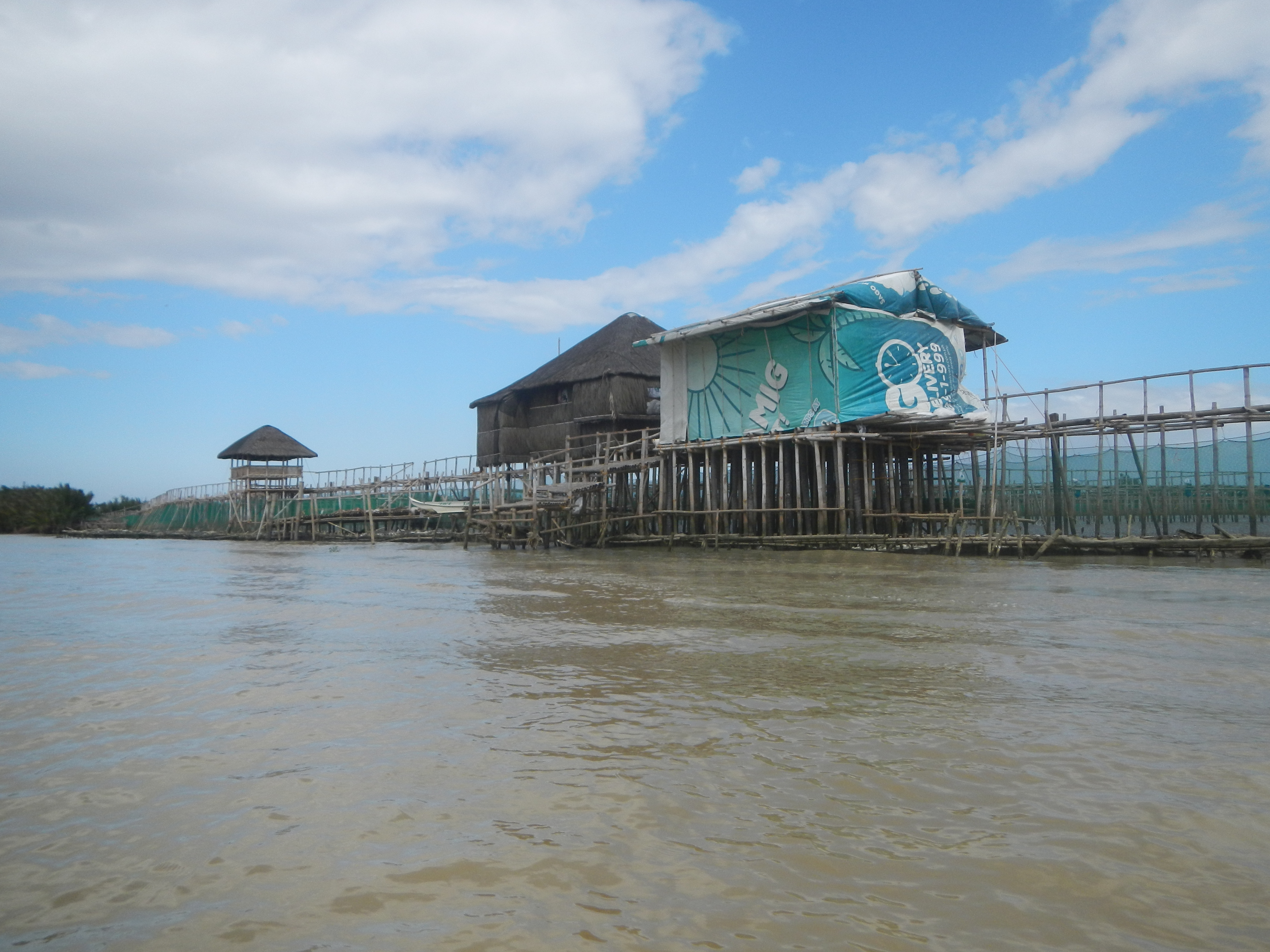
Aquaculture structure in a river near the coast of Bulacan

Aquaculture and municipal capture fisheries combined produced 73% of all catch from 2011 to 2020. In 2018, the aquaculture sector produced 826.01 thousand tons of fish, crustaceans, and mollusks, worth $1.89 billion, the 11th-largest national production in the world accounting for 1.01% of global production. This included 1.48 million tons of seaweed and other aquatic plants, 4.56% of 2018's global seaweed production. In 2020, the aquaculture sector made up 41.82% of the total value of Philippine fisheries, directly employing 233,725 people. In 2021, there were 1.34 million tons of seaweed produced, 3.82% of global production, 4th largest in the world. 93% of the 913.40 tons of brackish aquaculture production in 2020 was milkfish. Most (53.34%) brackish water aquaculture takes place in Bangsamoro, with a quarter (25.18%) taking place in Region I. The most commonly farmed shrimp is the jumbo tiger shrimp, which made up 42,453.94 tons of the total 70,474.77 2020 shrimp production. The second most farmed was the whiteleg shrimp, of which 20,612.48 tons were produced.

Aquaculture production in 2020
	Method	Total production (metric tons)	Key regions (production in metric tons)
Freshwater	Fish ponds	170,939.11	III (132,827.85)
Freshwater	Fish cages	74,010.90	IV-A (64,576.88)
Freshwater	Fish pens	39,847.67	IV-A (26,575.91)
Freshwater	Small farm reservoirs	114.41	Bangsamoro (37.16), XII (36.03), III (24.98)
Freshwater	Rice-fish systems	5.21	I (2.23)
Marine	Fish cages	149,661.38	I (101,984.67)
Marine	Fish pens	846.38	I (309.90), VI (197.48)
Marine	Seaweed	1,468,653.27	Bangsamoro (711,141.33), IV-B (320,717.21), IX (202,606.31)
Marine	Oysters	53,032.06	III (38,880.26), VI (10,569.86)
Marine	Mussels	19,228.97	VI (8,534.16), IV-A (5,654.23), VIII (4,085.92)

Tilapia made up 96% of all freshwater fish pond production in 2020, with the rest including milkfish, carp, catfish, mudfish, gourami, and prawns. Freshwater cage aquaculture is also dominated by tilapia, which makes up 86.82% of production, with the rest being milkfish, carp, and catfish. Freshwater fish pens produced 42.71% tilapia, 30.21% milkfish, and 27.06% carp. Of the small amount produced in small farm reservoirs, 73% was tilapia, with the remainder being milkfish, carp, catfish, gourami, and mudfish. Of the very small rice-fish system production, 71.02% is tilapia. Milkfish dominates marine fish cages production, making up 99.91% of output. Milkfish similarly dominates marine fish pen production, making up 98.38% of the total. However, the largest mariculture product is seaweed, the production of which made Bangsamoro the most productive fisheries region in 2020.

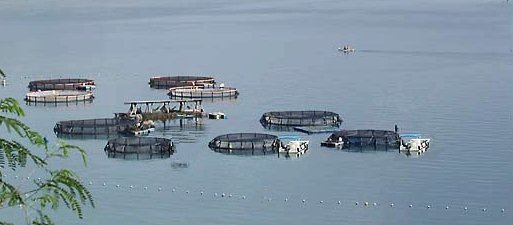
Fish cages in Maitum

The production of algae through aquaculture grew from 707.0 thousand tonnes in 2000 to around 1,500 thousand tonnes annually in the years since then. In 2012, the Philippines 1.75 million tons of farmed seaweed produced made the country the world's third-largest producer. Carrageenan makes up 94% of seaweed exports. In 2022, seaweed exports were 48,491 metric tons, exported to the United States, the Netherlands, Spain, Germany, and China. Seaweed and oyster farming products are often sold to exporters of high-value goods, rather than being farmed directly for local food supply. Out of all fisheries products, seaweed exports are second only to tuna.

Philippine aquaculture is hampered by the lack of a "trash fish" — a cheap fish that can be used to feed farmed fish — as most fish in the Philippines are directly valuable for human consumption. This increases the cost of farming carnivorous fish. Another common impediment is access to juveniles, for fish, crabs, and shrimp. For many species farmers often rely on hatcheries to obtain stock for their ponds. Milkfish fry are deliberately wild-caught as juveniles to stock aquaculture ponds. Some giant freshwater prawn operations have relied on imported juveniles. Shellfish farming is vulnerable to red tides, and is thus risky as a sole source of income. The damage caused by the annual typhoon season means coastal aquaculture is more developed than ocean mariculture. Production is also affected by the El Niño–Southern Oscillation.

== Socioeconomic impact ==
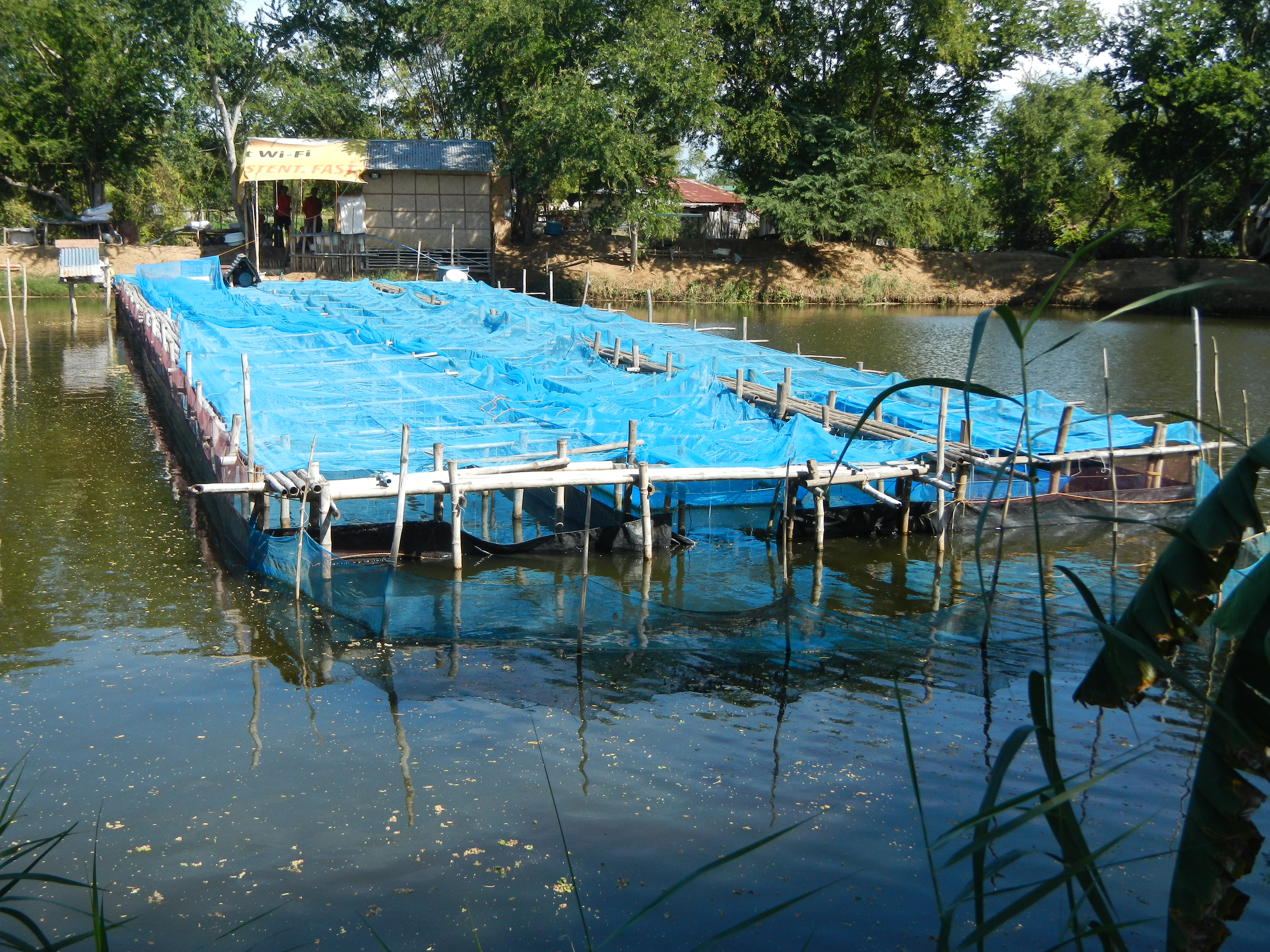
A shrimp hatchery in Macabebe

=== Food security and nutrition ===
Aquaculture contributes to food security. As wild stocks are declining, overall fisheries production is reliant on aquaculture, and thus greatly affected by changes in government funding, water quality, and disease. However, aquaculture products are not as nutritious as wild-caught fish, with milkfish and tilapia containing relatively less protein, calcium, Vitamin A, Omega-3, iron, and selenium.

Most aquaculture products are sold in domestic markets, often in ports where established fish markets already cater to capture fisheries. Over time aquaculture has become a larger component of domestic fishery production. As of 2020, aquaculture products took up 0.83% of the average spend of urban populations (compared with 0.54% for wild-caught fish), and 0.80% of the average rural spend (0.67% for wild-caught fish).

=== Employment and ownership ===
Aquaculture provides employment and export goods. In some areas, it is the dominant industry. As an example, tilapia farming is a core component of the economy of Lake Sebu, South Cotabato, in 1994 making up over 50% of total income and employing 10% of workers. Riverine and marine aquaculture provide an economic opportunity for poorer individuals, as access to water is much more available than access to land, which is often the property of rich landowners. Large aquaculture farms will hire both permanent and seasonal workers, while smaller operations are often family-run. Aquaculture development projects have tried by the government as a way to alleviate poverty among municipal fisherfolk. As of 2020, there were 233,725 individuals recorded as being employed in aquaculture. These figures do not include those who work in industries supplying aquaculture farms.

Fish ponds are often not worked by their owners, with the workers instead being caretakers or renters. Lobbying by the fish pond industry is influential. Although initially included in the Comprehensive Agrarian Reform Program, fish ponds were later exempted from this land reform effort. Meanwhile, the rental price of government land was kept at below-market rates. The possession of land is often valuable on its own, even if little effort is put into fish pond productivity. Almost all freshwater aquaculture is from private enterprise. The government has more ownership of brackish ponds, although these are often leased to private bodies on a long-term basis.

Small-scale fishermen often have difficulty accessing credit, with informal loans having interest as high as 20%. Credit is sometimes provided by buyers, in exchange for a guarantee of future produce. Some formal loans are issued by the government through various funds. In addition, under Presidential Decree 717, banks must have 25% of their loanable funds restricted to agriculture and fisheries projects. Compliance with this mandate has been patchy, and most bank loans go to larger companies. Fees for fish pond rental are small, and some interest-free loans are defaulted.

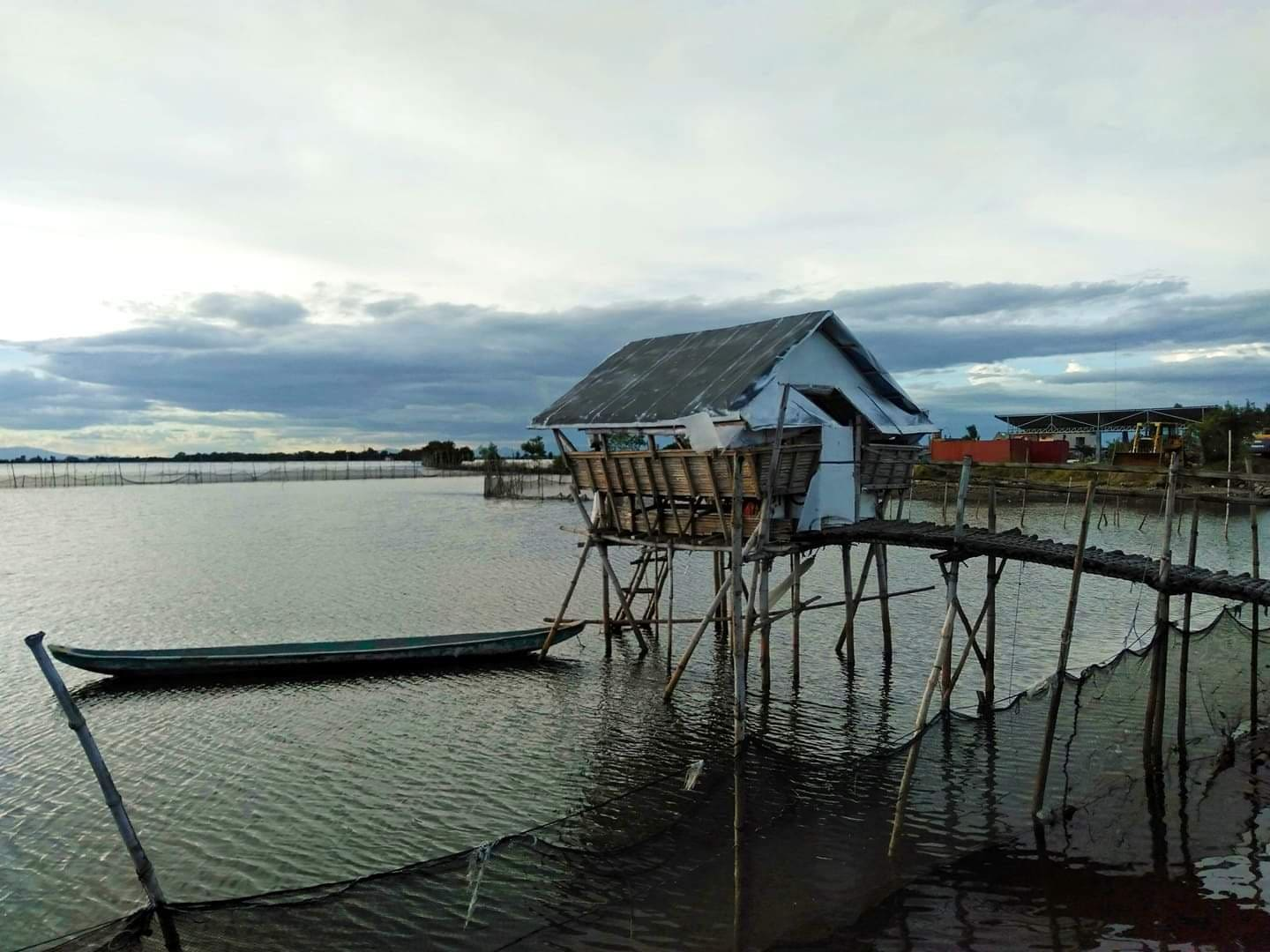
A fish pen in Meycauayan city

While some aquaculture-related jobs are performed by both genders, such as fish feeding, many, particularly those requiring more demanding physical labor such as construction, are predominantly held by men. A 1995 study found women more commonly involved in oyster farms than mussel farms, possibly due to oysters being farmed in shallower water. Women play a notably prominent role in seaweed farming. They also play a role in the post-harvest processing for different types of aquaculture, as well as in product marketing. It is not uncommon for women to be owner-operators of aquaculture farms. Overall, operators of fish farms and initial brokers are mostly men, while wholesalers and retailers are mostly women.

=== Conflict with capture fisheries ===
As fish pens are capital intensive, they exacerbated inequality in Laguna de Bay. Artisanal fisheries were forced to navigate around water now occupied by fish pens, and conflict emerged due to fears of poaching. Public pressure to dismantle fish pens has not overcome the political influence of fish pen owners. While the overall productivity and value of waters with fish pens in them may increase, resulting value is concentrated amongst fishpen owners rather than other users of the area. In 1997, fish cages located where Laguna de Bay flows into the Pansipit River were ordered to be demolished, to allow for fish migration and to improve scenic beauty. Some fish farmers have formed NGOs that serve as advocacy groups. These sometimes come into conflict with wild-fishery NGOs, due to the competing priorities of aquaculture and capture fishing.

== Environmental effects ==
=== Land use ===
The conversion of land to aquaculture use can not only affect that land, but also introduce pollutants into the surrounding environment. The replacement of sugar cane plantations with shrimp farms in Negros Occidental salinized affected land. Such conversion of agricultural land is rare, with fishpond development instead being concentrated elsewhere. In particular, mangrove forests have been widely converted into brackish ponds, often in violation of the law. This has resulted in aquaculture expansion being a major contributor to mangrove deforestation. Such deforestation destroys ecosystem services that are provided to local communities by these forests, while often producing much less value in return. Freshwater farming has less impact on the environment, and its wastewater can be used for irrigation.

=== Aquatic environment ===
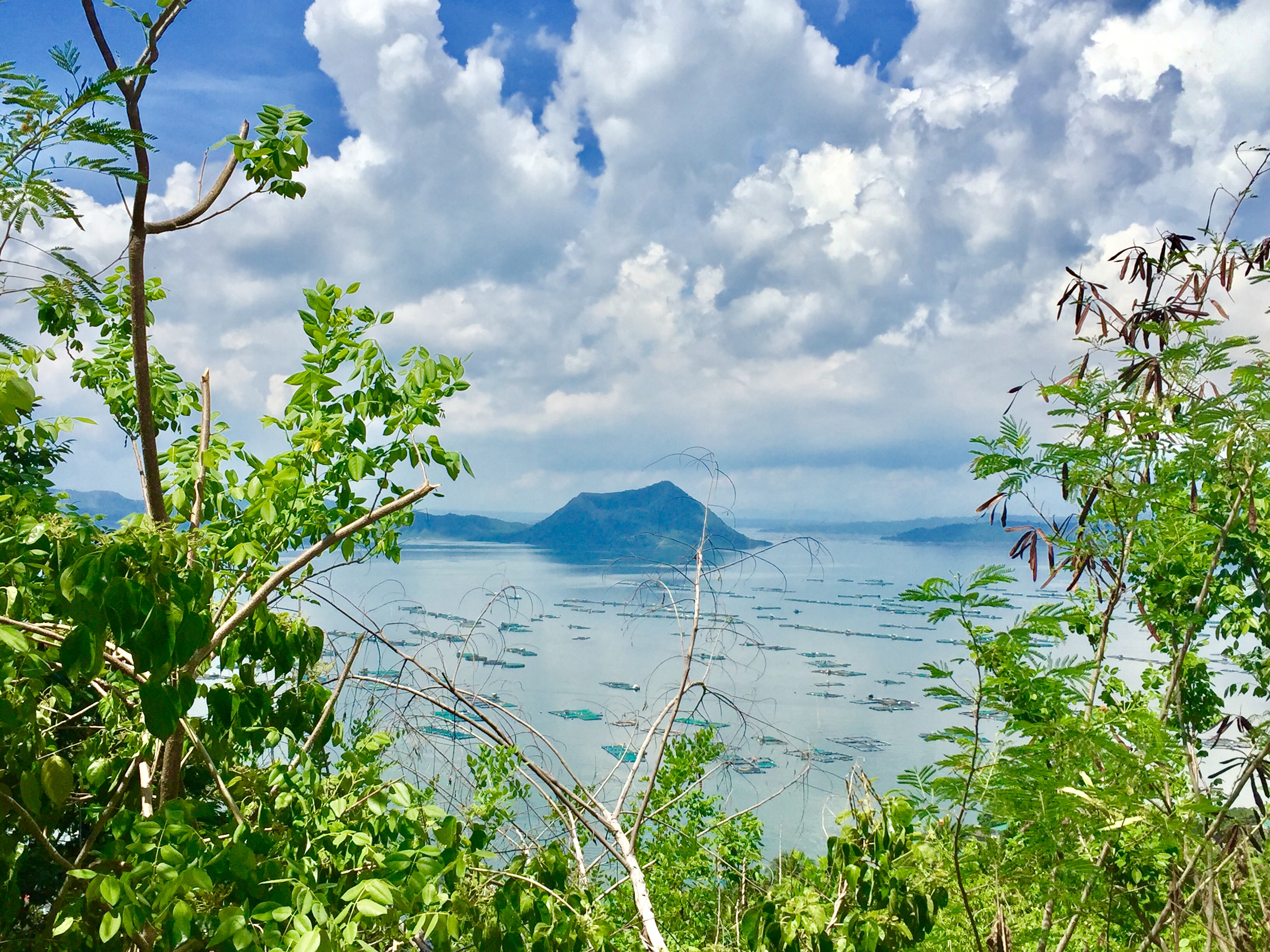
Aquaculture in Taal Lake

Fish pens and fish cages congest water bodies, divert resources from the natural ecosystem, and can affect oxygen saturation. This affects wildlife, including natural fish, crustaceans, and mollusk populations, although cages may have a lower impact on the benthic environment. The introduction of fish pens in Laguna de Bay decreased wild fish and shellfish catch. Tilapia fish cages caused the level of dissolved oxygen in Lake Sampaloc to decrease, creating a dead zone a few meters below the surface. The disturbance of such a lake, bringing deoxygenated water closer to the surface, can cause a mass fish kill, even of caged fish. The presence of aquaculture infrastructure, both for ponds and for aquatic structures, can affect sediment and water flow.

Over 100 biological and chemical products are known to be used in some form of Philippine aquaculture. These chemicals are known to cause issues in intensive farming, due to their high concentrations affecting nearby water quality. Maritime fish cages also affect nutrient deposition, creating areas of relatively concentrated organic matter. Such nutrient pollution can lead to fish kills. The water quality of affected areas in the Philippines varies throughout the year. Oyster, mussel, and seaweed farms are relatively low impact, both environmentally, due to the simple material requirements, and visually, due to their being mostly underwater. They cause some silt buildup and prevent some fishing gear from being used, but otherwise can coexist along small-scale fishing.

=== Ecosystem changes ===
The deliberate capture of milkfish fry creates unused by-catch. Other aquaculture species are mostly non-native. Since 1907, 169 freshwater foreign species have been introduced (not all for aquaculture purposes), of which at least 82% have formed invasive wild populations. Introduced Eurasian carp and Nile tilapia have impacted multiple native species, for example, endemic species of Mount Isarog National Park. Tilapia played a role in bringing the native sinarapan fish to the brink of extinction and greatly reduced the population of flathead grey mullet in Naujan Lake. In Laguna de Bay, walking catfish, Hypostomus plecostomus janitor fish, and clown featherback knifefish harm aquaculture and native species. The walking catfish directly outcompetes the native broadhead catfish. Sailfin molly have harmed native insect populations. The Pterygoplichthys disjunctivus janitor fish has become established in Agusan Marsh. Tilapia may have introduced the Arctodiaptomus dorsalis copepod, which competes with native copepods.

While the establishment of some invasive populations was accidental, like those of janitor fish and clown featherbacks, some populations were created intentionally, like those of Nile tilapia. Many introductions took place from the 1970s to the 1990s. The release of captive native species poses risks to the genetic variability of wild populations. Non-fish invasive species include Pontederia crassipes water hyacinth and Chinese softshell turtles, bred ornamentally and for food respectively. These damage not only the natural environment and biodiversity, but also aquaculture operations in affected waters.

== Management ==
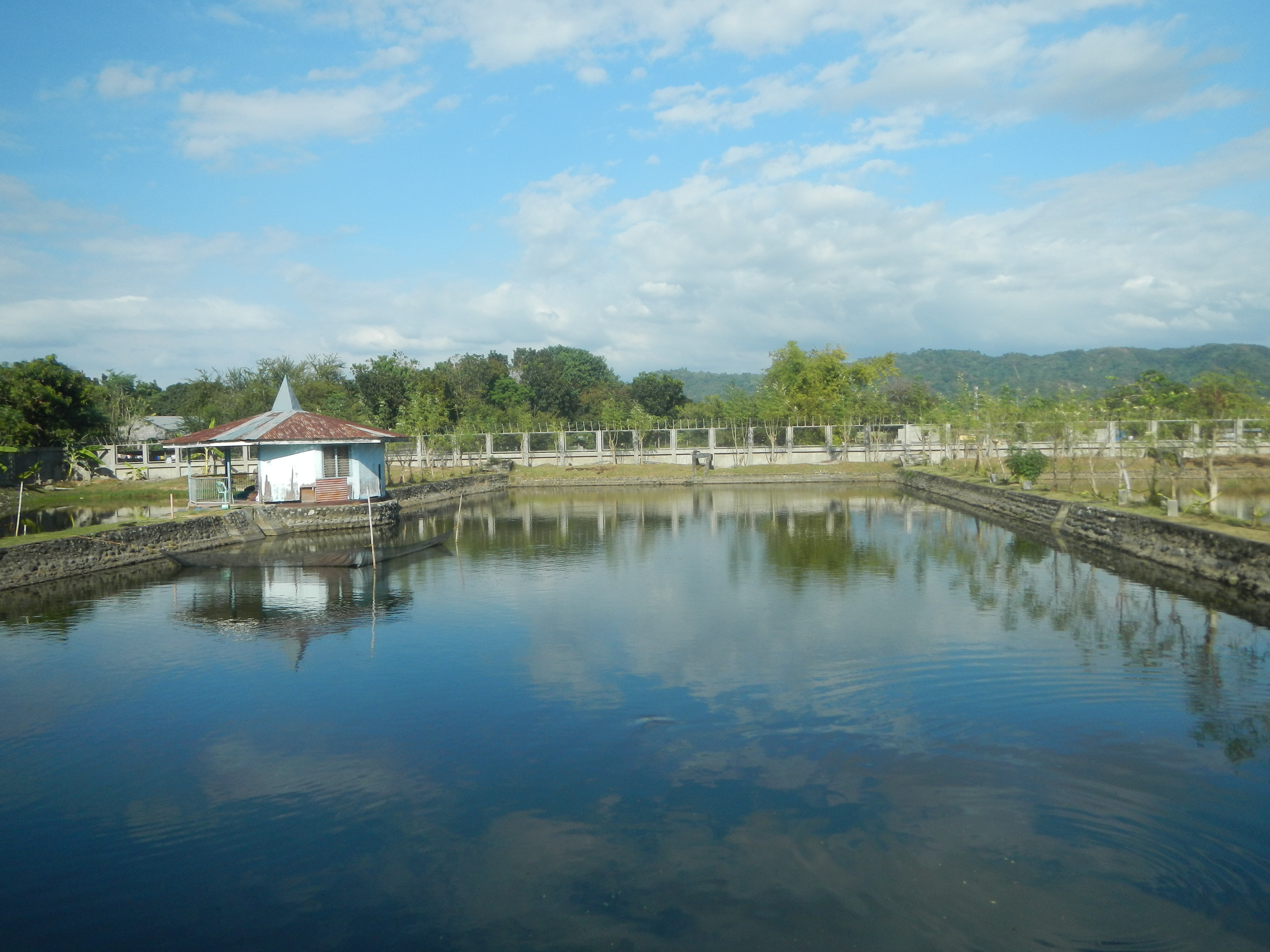
A fish farm in Agoo

Fishery resources fall under the Department of Agriculture, which contains the Bureau of Fisheries and Aquatic Resources (BFAR), the Philippine Fisheries Development Authority (PFDA), and the National Fisheries Research and Development Institute (NFRDI). PFDA manages ports. NFRDI was created by the Fisheries Code of 1998.

The Fisheries Decree of 1975 blocked the privatization of government-owned fish ponds. The Local Government Code of 1991 devolved responsibility for fisheries licensing and regulation to cities and municipalities (with the exception of leasing public land for fish ponds, which remains with BFAR). RA 8435, the Agriculture and Fisheries Modernization Act, was passed on December 22, 1997, quickly followed by RA 8550, the Philippine Fisheries Code, on February 25, 1998.

The Fisheries Code of 1998 has provisions that affect or are directly targeted at aquaculture. This code mandates that aquaculture areas, including privately owned ones, be registered with their Local Government Unit. It maintained the block against privatization. The Fisheries Code initially banned fish pens, cages, and traps, in lakes, although this provision was not included in widely debated drafts. Sea-based cages are supposedly restricted from the migration routes of wild fish populations. The Comprehensive Agrarian Reform Program of 1998 includes the guarantee of water resource access for seaweed farmers. BFAR's Fisheries Administrative Order (FAO) No. 214 (2001), also known as the Code of Practice for Aquaculture mandates environmental impact assessments for aquaculture projects, as does the more general Fisheries Code of 1998. The Wildlife Resources Conservation and Protection Act of 2001 and the BFAR Fisheries Administrative Order 233-1 of 2010 promote the protection of native species, including those important for aquaculture.

Bodies of water are public property, and their use requires local government approval. Under the Fisheries Code, while public water bodies can be leased for use, they cannot be sold. Only 10% of the surface area can be used for aquaculture. Fish ponds can be under 25-year leases from BFAR, shorter leases, or on private property. Mangrove areas are considered forests, and fall under the jurisdiction of the national government. Theoretically, mangroves are protected and cannot be converted, limiting potential fish pond area. Laws regulating the use of public natural resources, such as requiring 50 metres (160 ft) of mangroves near the water's edge, are often flouted. Under the Fisheries Code of 1998, all unused or underused fish farms should be restored to mangrove forests, although rent costs being so low means classifying a fish pond as underused is difficult.

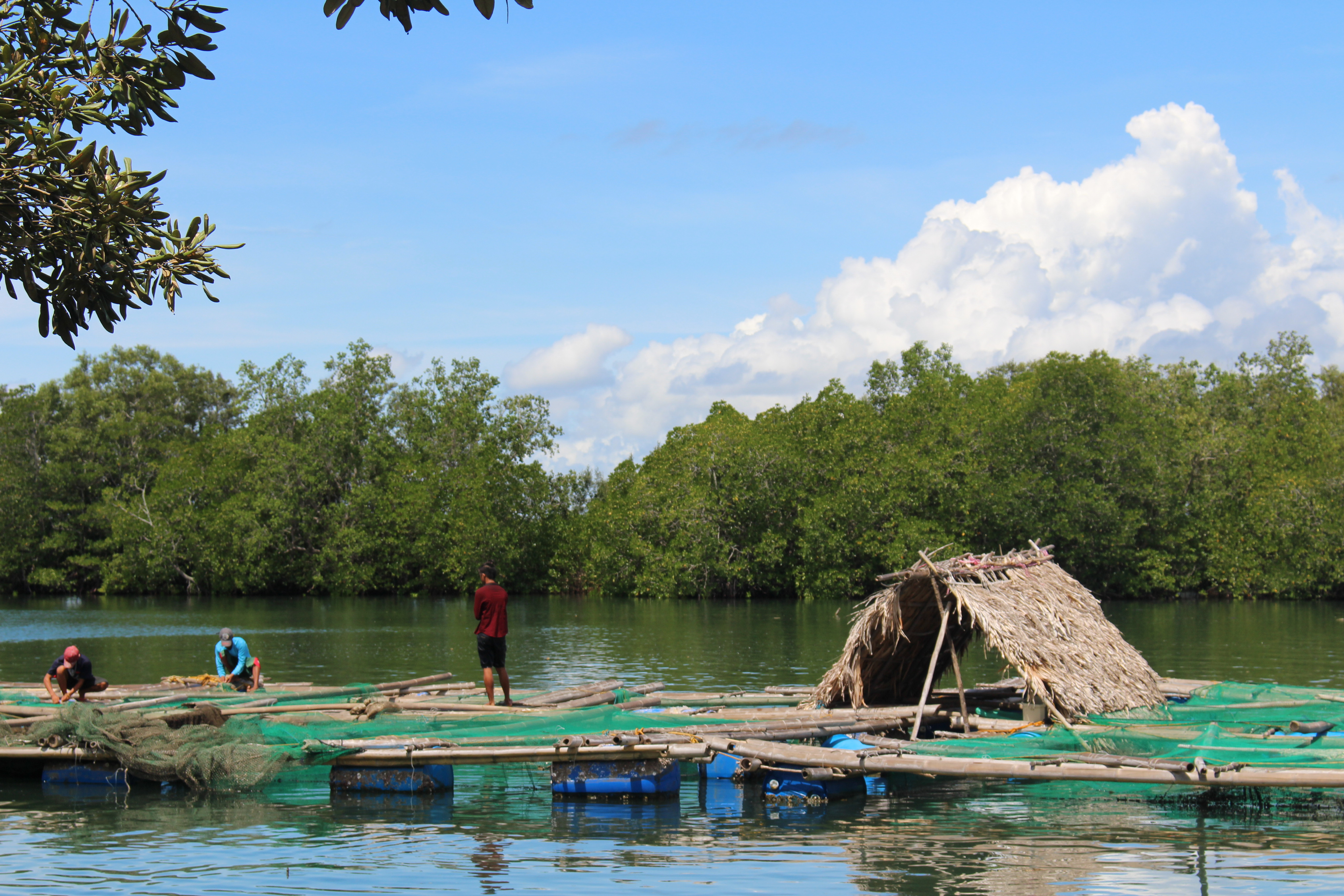
Grouper fish cages in Del Gallego

Local governments are responsible for licensing aquaculture structures, such as fish pens, cages, and traps. Where multiple local governments share a water body, a joint Fisheries and Aquatic Resources Management Council (FARMC) can be formed. These councils include not only local government or barangay officials, but representatives from NGOs, fisherfolk groups, and the private sector. BFAR is responsible for fish pond lease agreements, imports and exports, and food safety. While Philippine sustainability laws are often not followed, the external requirements of export markets can incentivize compliance due to the need for certification and traceability. Labor standards are set by the Department of Labor and Employment, with minimum wages varying by region. Since 2001, aquaculture farm operators have been required to obtain employees through labor cooperatives. This may improve adherence to employment laws, but also removes some ability of workers to self-organize.

Fisheries in Laguna de Bay are regulated by the Laguna Lake Development Authority (LLDA). The LLDA's approval is required for any construction in the lake, including aquaculture infrastructure such as fish pens and fish corrals. While the Laguna Lake Development Authority limits individual pens to 5 hectares (12 acres), and corporate pens to 50 hectares (120 acres), these rules have at some times been bypassed through the use of paper corporations. The appearance of the invasive clown featherback in Laguna de Bay, possibly washed into the lake by Typhoon Ketsana in 2009, reduced the native populations of not only the wild Leiopotherapon plumbeus, but farmed bighead carp, milkfish, and Nile tilapia. Native species in the lake such as the climbing perch, Manila sea catfish, Celebes goby, broadhead catfish, and mudfish can also be used for aquaculture.

Research has often involved government bodies. The Department of Science and Technology (DOST) carries out research related to fisheries, including through its Philippine Council for Aquatic and Marine Research and Development (PCAMRD). Many colleges have fishery courses that offer majors in Inland Fisheries, Marine Fisheries, and Fish Processing Technology. The Inland Fisheries majors have a strong focus on pond aquaculture. The Southeast Asian Fisheries Development Center carries out aquaculture research in Iloilo. A Comprehensive National Fisheries Industry Development Plan (CNFIDP) was put in place for 2006–2025, and included plans to increase aquaculture. The most recent revision was issued for 2021–2025. One aim of the CNFIDP is to improve domestic milkfish fry production. BFAR maintains a roadmap for the tilapia industry.

== History ==
The first farmed fish is thought to be milkfish, whose fry was collected from tidal waters and raised in brackish ponds. This traditional practice persisted in Mactan, Cebu, until 1921. Freshwater fish ponds were likely first used sometime in the early 20th century, although there is history of small-scale rice-fish system use. Despite many species being introduced for farming, production remained limited due to competition with cropland and a cultural preference for marine fish. Oyster farming began in 1931. The Fishpond Lease Agreement (FLA) system and a Fishpond Permit (FP) system were established in 1937, allowing for rental of government land for aquaculture. Due to the reliance on wild catch to support traditional milkfish ponds, shrimp fry often also ended up in these ponds, and ponds were occasionally contaminated with seaweed. Shrimp and seaweed thus became initially farmed as a secondary products.

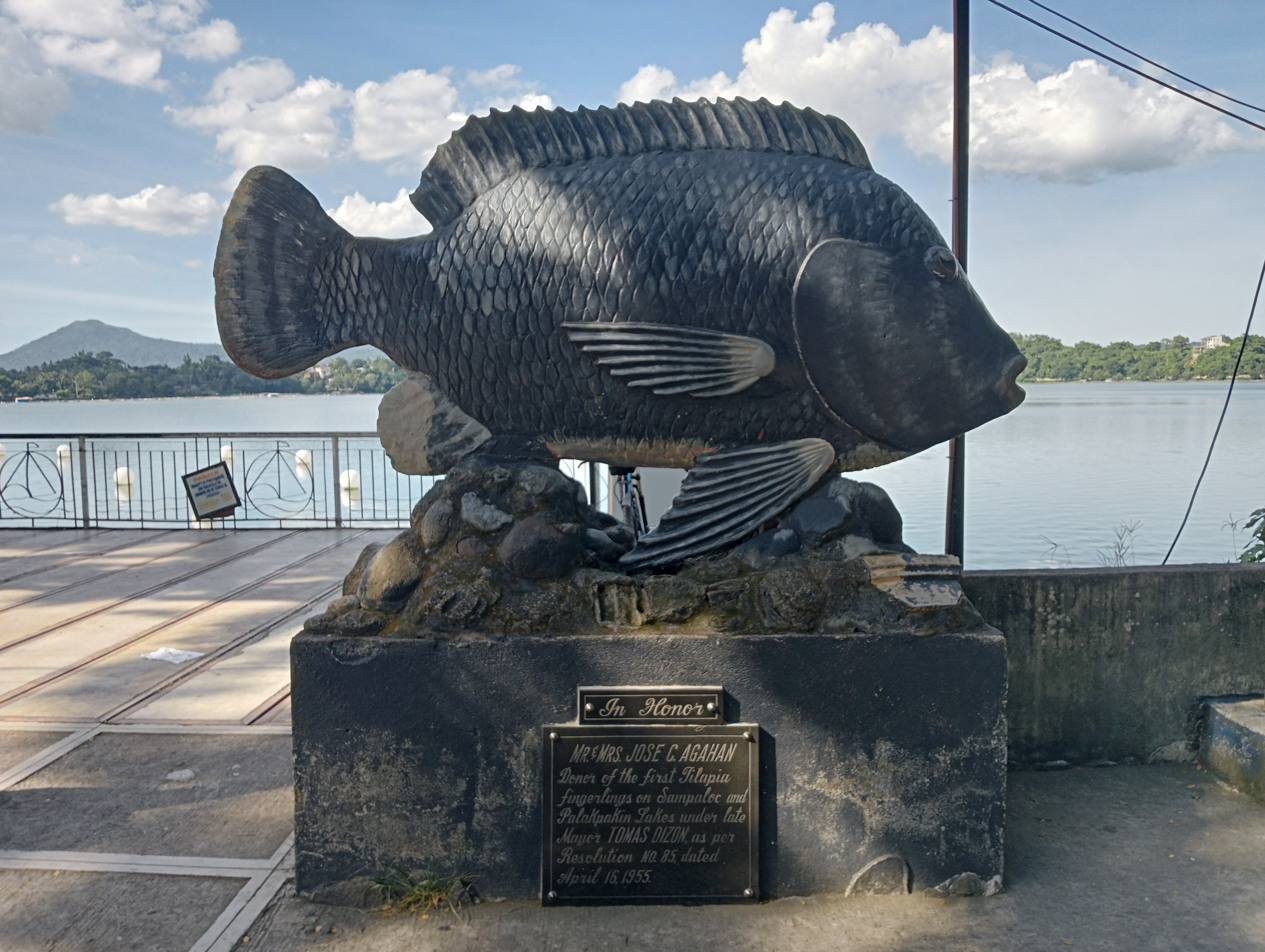
A monument in San Pablo, Laguna, celebrating the introduction of tilapia to Lake Palakpakin and Lake Sampaloc

Mozambique tilapia were imported from Thailand in 1950. Tilapia were much easier to breed than milkfish, making it possible for anyone to maintain a small-scale tilapia farm. The fish was initially popular and pushed by politicians, however the resulting fish were often unwanted. Mussel farming began in 1955 in an existing oyster farm, as an attempt to shift the view of oyster farmers from treating mussels as a pest to treating them as another commodity. Production remained around Manila Bay until the 1970s, due to the limited natural range of Perna viridis. However, Perna viridis eventually spread to other areas, possibly as biofouling pollution in bilge water. In the 1960s, crabs of the Scylla genus, which had previously been opportunistically farmed in milkfish ponds, began to be more actively managed. In the 1960s, demand for carrageenan led to Eucheuma seaweed being commercially farmed for export. Seaweed farms often served as a reliable secondary source of income.

Bamboo fish cages were first introduced in 1965 to the freshwater Laguna de Bay, although their use remained limited. In the 1970s, bamboo and net milkfish pens were established by the Laguna Lake Development Authority, and were widely adopted. However, they proliferated to the extent the lake became oversaturated, and many were later abandoned.

1972 saw the crucial importation of Nile tilapia. These grew faster than Mozambique tilapia, were resilient to poor environmental conditions, and were popular with consumers. This introduction, alongside the ability to farm single-gender ponds, saw freshwater tilapia farming expand from a small-scale seasonal enterprise to widespread commercial production. By the mid-1980s, tilapia were the second most farmed fish after milkfish.

Jumbo tiger shrimp were successfully bred in captivity the 1970s. Dedicated shrimp farming began in Negros Occidental, where sugar fields were often converted into aquaculture farms. Jumbo tiger shrimp became the largest marine export of the Philippines. A 1980 ban on the conversion of mangroves to aquaculture was ineffective, with conversion rates increasing in the following years.

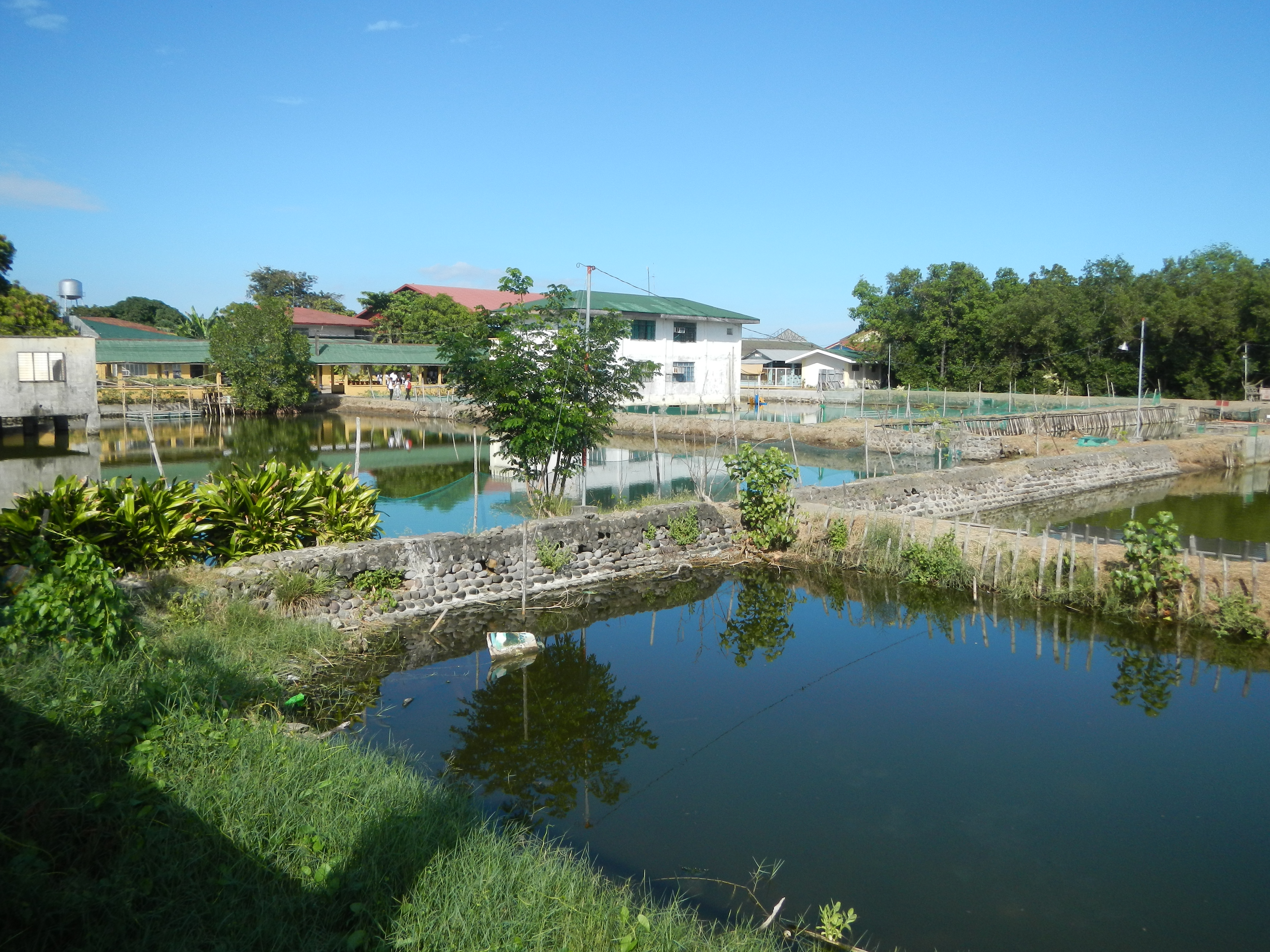
Fish ponds in Orion, Bataan

The Local Government Code of 1991 shifted seaweed licencing responsibilities from the national government, which allowed seaweed farms to have a maximum size of 1 hectare (2.5 acres), to local governments. The FLA fishpond land lease system of 25 years renewable to 50 years was preserved in the Fisheries Code of 1998. Aquaculture expansion began receiving significant financial support from the government and multilateral organizations in the 1990s, as wild fish stocks decreased.

Marine fish cage use become large enough to be recorded in 1993. Fish cage farming spread both in inland rivers and in coastal marine water. Milkfish continued to dominate aquaculture throughout this period, being able to be farmed across varied environmental conditions. In the mid-1990s, intensive shrimp farming methods were applied to milkfish when the rapid shift to industrial shrimp ponds led to market oversaturation and the spread of disease. In 1998, the first commercial farming of tilapia able to survive in brackish water took place in Negros Occidental.

From 1980 to 2010, capture fisheries were dominant. Since this time, aquaculture has since increased in relative prominence. Despite aquaculture production levelling off and slightly declining starting around 2010, from 2012 to 2021, aquaculture was far more productive than municipal fisheries, whose productivity was in turn slightly higher than that of commercial fisheries. In terms of value the difference was not as large. From 2013 to 2022, aquaculture production by volume fluctuated slightly, although its value increased.

In 2022, there were 2.35 million metric tons of aquaculture products created in the Philippines, 54.15% of all fisheries products in the Philippines, with a total value of around PhP 124.00 billion. The biggest item by volume was seaweed, which made up 65.8% of aquaculture production. This created a value of PhP 16,60 billion, less than some other fishery products due to seaweed having a lower value per unit weight. The largest environment for aquaculture aside from seaweed farms was brackish ponds, followed by freshwater ponds and marine cages. By product type, the second largest by volume and highest by value was milkfish, of which 184,162.33 metric tons (47.47%) were produced in fish ponds and 180,290.27 metric tons (46.47%) were produced in fish cages. Tilapia was third by volume and third by value, with 77.19% of these tilapia being farmed in fish ponds. Shrimp was fourth by volume and second by value, with the most produced and most valuable shrimp being jumbo tiger shrimp. Seaweed farms produced the fourth-most value.

== See also ==
- Austronesian fishing weirs
- Payao (fishing)
- Fish trap
