= Zobellia galactanivorans =

Scientific classification
- Domain: Bacteria
- Kingdom: Pseudomonadati
- Phylum: Bacteroidota
- Class: Flavobacteriia
- Order: Flavobacteriales
- Family: Flavobacteriaceae
- Genus: Zobellia
- Species: Z. galactanivorans

Binomial name
- Zobellia galactanivorans Barbeyron et al., 2001

Species of bacterium

Zobellia galactanivorans is a species of gram-negative marine bacterium isolated from the surface of red algae of the coast of France. Z. galactanivorans forms yellow colonies with a bacillus or diplobacillus morphology. Furthermore, it is mesophilic and can grow degrade carrageenans and agars - both found in the cell wall of red algae. Z. galactanivorans contains the gene porA and porB, each encoding a β-porphyranase.

== β-porphyranase ==
porA and porB are catalytic enzymes that hydrolyze the β-D-galactopyranose (1→4) α-L-galactopyranose-6-sulfate linkage in porphyran. There is a 35% sequence similarity between β-Porphyranase-B and β-Porphyranase-A.

== Horizontal gene transfer ==
Orthologs between Z. galactanivorans and Bacteroides plebeius-1698, a strain of Bacteroides plebeius, contain a sequence similarity of 48%-69%. Homologous genes between other Bacteroides species only have a 30% sequence similarity. Moreover, porphyranase genes in both Z. galactanivorans and B. plebeius are located in similar orders along their chromosome, or are syntenic.
