= Phocaeicola plebeius =

Scientific classification
- Domain: Bacteria
- Kingdom: Pseudomonadati
- Phylum: Bacteroidota
- Class: Bacteroidia
- Order: Bacteroidales
- Family: Bacteroidaceae
- Genus: Phocaeicola
- Species: P. plebeius

Binomial name
- Phocaeicola plebeius (Kitahara et al. 2005) García-López et al. 2020

Synonyms
- Bacteroides plebeius Kitahara et al. 2005

Species of bacterium

Phocaeicola plebeius, formerly Bacteroides plebeius, is a microbe found in the human gut, most commonly in Japan natives. It is able to digest porphyran, a polysacchide from Porphyra seaweed (nori) that humans cannot digest on their own. The porphyranase-encoding gene Bp1689 is believed to have been derived from the microbe Zobellia galactanivorans via horizontal gene transfer, as part of a gene cluster containing other carbohydrate-active enzymes.

== Composition of red algae Porphyra ==
Porphyra is a genus of red seaweed. The two main Porphyra used in Japanese dishes are P. yezoensis and P. tenera which are commonly used in sushi. Porphyra spp. also known as nori in Japan contains compounds such porphyrans and agaroses that are indigestible to people lacking P. plebius. Rhodophyta, the phylum of red algae, has a cell wall composed of sulfated galactans. Agarans, a main component of the cell wall is composed of alternating 3-linked β-D-galactose and 4-linked α-L-galactose. Porphyran is a water-soluble agaran found in Porphyra. The porphyran backbone is composed of roughly 30% 3-linked β-D-galactose and 4-linked 3,6-anhydro-α-L-galactose. The remaining 70% is composed of 4-linked α-L-galactopyranose-6-sulfate or 3-linked β-D-galactopyranose.

== Horizontal gene transfer ==
P. plebeius is believed to have acquired a cluster of sugar-processing enzymes from Z. galactanivorans, a marine bacterium. The two most important transferred genes are Bp1689 (GH16 β-porphyranase) and Bp1670 (GH16 agarase), as the enzymes they make deal with sugars found in the molecule. (Other transferred genes, such as two GH86 aragases, a sulfatase, and various regulatory parts, play a role too.) Specifically, Bp1689 hydrolyzes the (1→4) linkage between β-D-galactopyranose and α-L-galactopyranose-6-sulfate in porphyran. Structurally it contains a TIM barrel domain and two β-sandwich domains.

A number of other genes are also transferred with Bp1689 and Bp1670. In total, 11 genes are believed to have been transferred: they do not occur in other Phocaeicola species (known as of 2010) and have sequence similarity of 48%-69% compared to orthologs in Z. galactanivorans. Moreover, transferred genes in both species are located in similar orders along their chromosome (i.e. they are syntenic). There are also genes related to the HGT in these 11.

In 2012, it was reported that Bacteroides thetaiotaomicron VPI-5482 has a related set of genes in the same order, albeit specialized to a different task: degradation of α-mannan, a fungal sugar. Discovery of this more intact cluster further confirms the role of HGT.

A different nomenclature of these genes use the gene family instead of chromosomal sequence numbers. In this scheme, Bp1689 is BpGH16B and Bp1670 is BpGH16A.

== Impact on colon cancer ==
A recent study in mice showed that gut colonization by P. plebeius can suppress colitis-associated colon cancer, especially when combined with a seaweed diet. Mice colonized with P. plebeius and fed seaweed had reduced inflammation and fewer, smaller tumors. The study found that P. plebeius altered the gut microbiota, increasing abundance of bacteria with anti-inflammatory effects. This was accompanied by downregulation of cytokines and other immune-related genes, such as chemokines. Some genes, including Spta1, Malrd1, Six2, and Ugy2b5, were upregulated, though their connection to tumor development is still unclear. The mechanism by which P. plebeius affects host gene expression is unknown, but may involve microbial metabolites.

Another mechanism of tumor suppression may relate to fucose, a sugar that increases during colon cancer and promotes tumor growth. P. plebeius produces α-fucosidase, an enzyme that breaks down fucose, potentially reducing its concentration in the gut and limiting its tumor-promoting effects.
