= Sulfurylase =

Sulfurylase may refer to:

- Galactose-6-sulfurylase
- an alternate name for the sulfate adenylyltransferase
