= PORB =

PORB may refer to:

- Beta-porphyranase, an enzyme
- Corynebacterial porin B, a protein
