= Zobellia amurskyensis =

Scientific classification
- Domain: Bacteria
- Kingdom: Pseudomonadati
- Phylum: Bacteroidota
- Class: Flavobacteriia
- Order: Flavobacteriales
- Family: Flavobacteriaceae
- Genus: Zobellia
- Species: Z. amurskyensis

Binomial name
- Zobellia amurskyensis Nedashkovskaya et al. 2004

Bacterium

Zobellia amurskyensis is a species of Gram-negative, heterotrophic and aerobic bacterium from the genus of Zobellia. The species was named after the Amursky Bay, where it was first isolated.
