= Poligeenan =

Type of polymer

Poligeenan (CAS No. 53973-98-1) is a low viscosity, low molecular weight, sulfated polygalactan polymer used exclusively in clinical diagnostic applications. The polymer is derived from the molecular backbone of carrageenan.

== Terminology ==
The name "poligeenan" was confirmed in 1988 by the United States Adopted Names (USAN) Council. The Council is sponsored by the American Medical Association, the American Pharmaceutical Association, and the US Pharmacopeial Convention Inc.

Prior to 1988, poligeenan was referred to as "degraded carrageenan" in the scientific literature. The terms "poligeenan" and "degraded carrageenan" were often used interchangeably in research articles and reports. The use of the term "degraded carageenan" caused confusion, which resulted in the attribution of the negative observations associated with the polymer being attributed to carrageenan. Poligeenan and carrageenan are completely different products.

== Usage ==
=== Diagnostic ===
The primary use for poligeenan is for clinical diagnostic applications, and specifically the suspension of barium sulfate slurries used in X-ray studies of the mouth, throat, and esophagus during swallowing. For this application, poligeenan delivers three essential properties: First, its viscosity imparts lubricity to make the slurry easier to swallow. Second, this same viscosity is high enough to maintain full suspension of all barium sulfate particles during the complete X-ray procedure. Third, the high charge density of the poligeenan solution (ester sulfate units) prevents caking or aggregation of the barium sulfate particles during long-term storage of ready-to-use slurry products, these being easily reconstituted by shaking. The combination of these three application properties necessitates poligeenan to have molecular weights in the range 10-20 kDa.

=== Experimental research ===
In 1969, Adrian Julian Marcus and James Watt demonstrated that poligeenan could induce gastrointestinal lesions in animal models, which was followed by decades of medical research using the substance to study inflammatory bowel disease.

=== Food ===
Poligeenan is not an approved food additive in the United States. The low molecular weight of poligeenan precludes it from exhibiting functionality in food. The International Agency for Research on Cancer assigned poligeenan to carcinogenic risk category 2B (possibly carcinogenic to humans). Unlike poligeenan, carrageenan is an approved food additive with an extensive toxicology data base that has been reviewed by regulatory bodies and provides scientific evidence for safe inclusion in foods.

== Production ==
Poligeenan is produced by the harsh acid degradation of carrageenan. Carrageenan in solution is processed at low pH (~1.0) and high temperature (90 °C (190 °F)) for up to six hours until the weight-average molecular weight (M_{w}) has been reduced to the range 10,000 – 20,000 daltons (10–20 kDa). The resulting poligeenan solution is neutralized and spray dried to a fine powder.
