= Zobellia =

Scientific classification
- Domain: Bacteria
- Kingdom: Pseudomonadati
- Phylum: Bacteroidota
- Class: Flavobacteriia
- Order: Flavobacteriales
- Family: Flavobacteriaceae
- Genus: Zobellia; Barbeyron et al. 2001

Type species
- Zobellia galactanivorans

Species
- Zobellia amurskyensis; Zobellia galactanivorans; Zobellia laminariae; Zobellia russellii; Zobellia uliginosa

Genus of bacteria

Zobellia genus of is a strictly aerobic gram-negative bacteria from the family of Flavobacteriaceae. Zobellia bacteria occur in marine habitats.
