= Galactose-6-sulfurylase =

Class of enzymes

Identifiers
- EC no.: 2.5.1.5
- CAS no.: 9030-36-8

Databases
- IntEnz: IntEnz view
- BRENDA: BRENDA entry
- ExPASy: NiceZyme view
- KEGG: KEGG entry
- MetaCyc: metabolic pathway
- PRIAM: profile
- PDB structures: RCSB PDB PDBe PDBsum
Search
- PMC: articles
- PubMed: articles
- NCBI: proteins

In enzymology, a galactose-6-sulfurylase (EC 2.5.1.5) is an enzyme that catalyzes the chemical reaction

Eliminates sulfate from the D-galactose 6-sulfate residues of porphyran, producing 3,6-anhydrogalactose residues.

This enzyme belongs to the family of transferases, specifically those transferring aryl or alkyl groups other than methyl groups. The systematic name of this enzyme class is D-galactose-6-sulfate:alkyltransferase (cyclizing). Other names in common use include porphyran sulfatase, galactose-6-sulfatase, and galactose 6-sulfatase.
