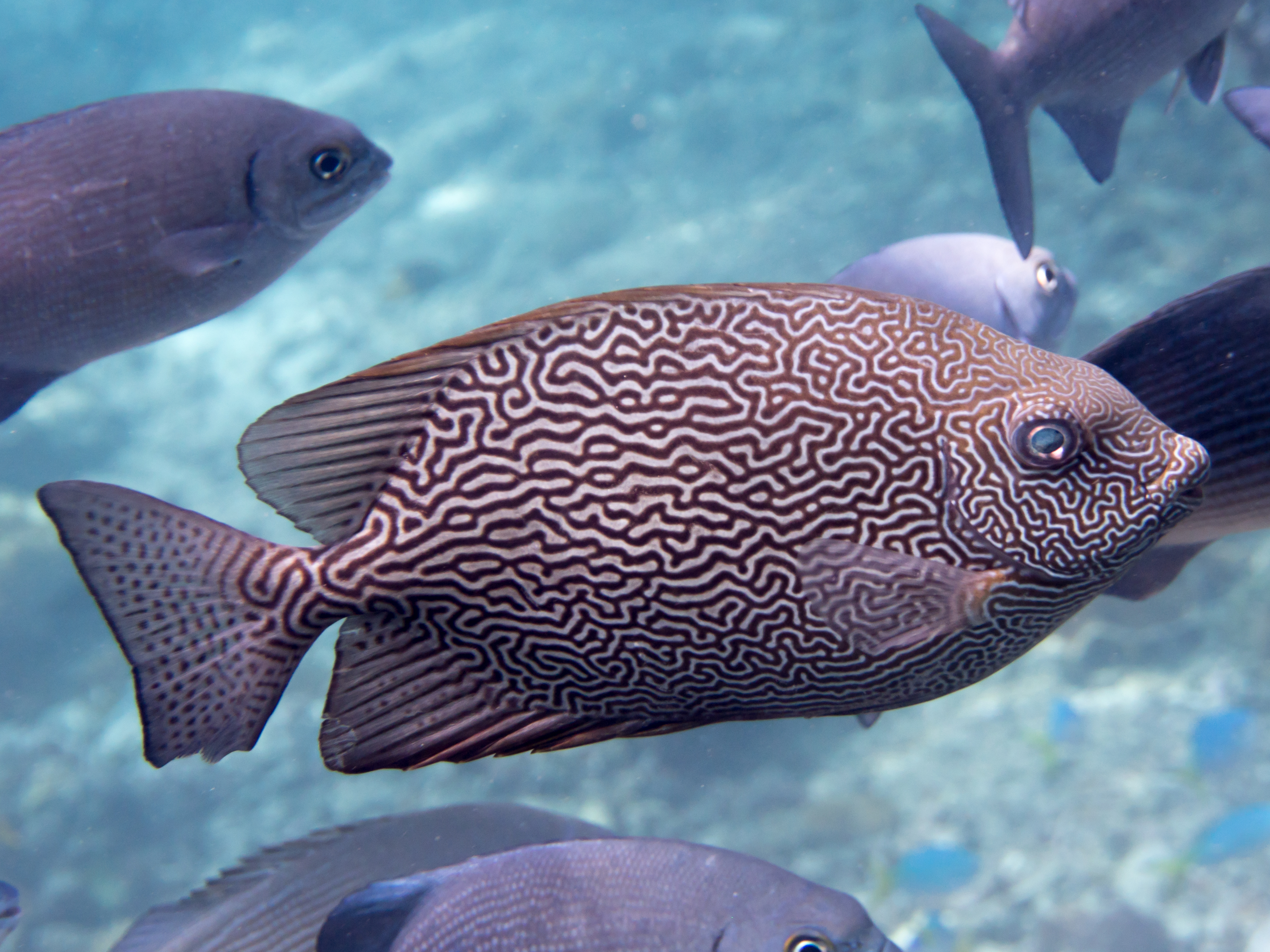

Conservation status
- Least Concern (IUCN 3.1)

Scientific classification
- Kingdom: Animalia
- Phylum: Chordata
- Class: Actinopterygii
- Order: Acanthuriformes
- Family: Siganidae
- Genus: Siganus
- Species: S. vermiculatus

Binomial name
- Siganus vermiculatus (Valenciennes, 1835)

Synonyms
- Amphacanthus vermiculatus Valenciennes, 1835; Teuthis vermiculata (Valenciennes, 1835); Teuthis vermiculatus (Valenciennes, 1835); Amphacanthus russelii Valenciennes, 1835; Siganus shortlandensis Seale, 1906

= Vermiculated spinefoot =

Species of fish

The vermiculated spinefoot (Siganus vermiculatus), also known as maze rabbitfish, scribbled spinefoot or vermiculate rabbitfish, is a species of marine ray-finned fish, a rabbitfish belonging to the family Siganidae. Like all rabbitfishes, it has venomous spines on the dorsal, anal, and pelvic fins. It is a reef associated fish species of the Indo-West Pacific region. It is a common commercially important fish in many tropical countries.

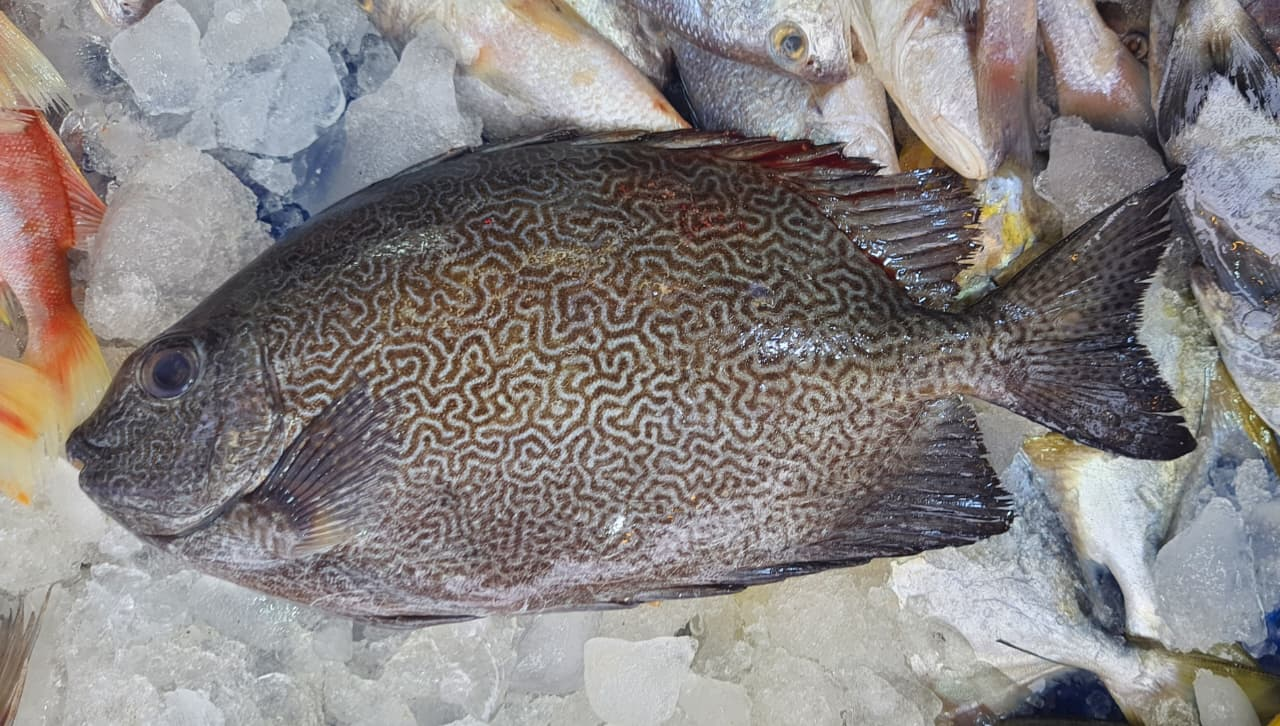
Siganus vermiculatus from Mangaluru, Karnataka, India

== Taxonomy ==
The vermiculated spinefoot was first formally described in 1835 as Amphacanthus vermiculatus by the French zoologist Achille Valenciennes with the type locality given as New Guinea. The specific name vermiculatus refers to the vermiculated or maze pattern on the bodies of the living fish.

== Description ==
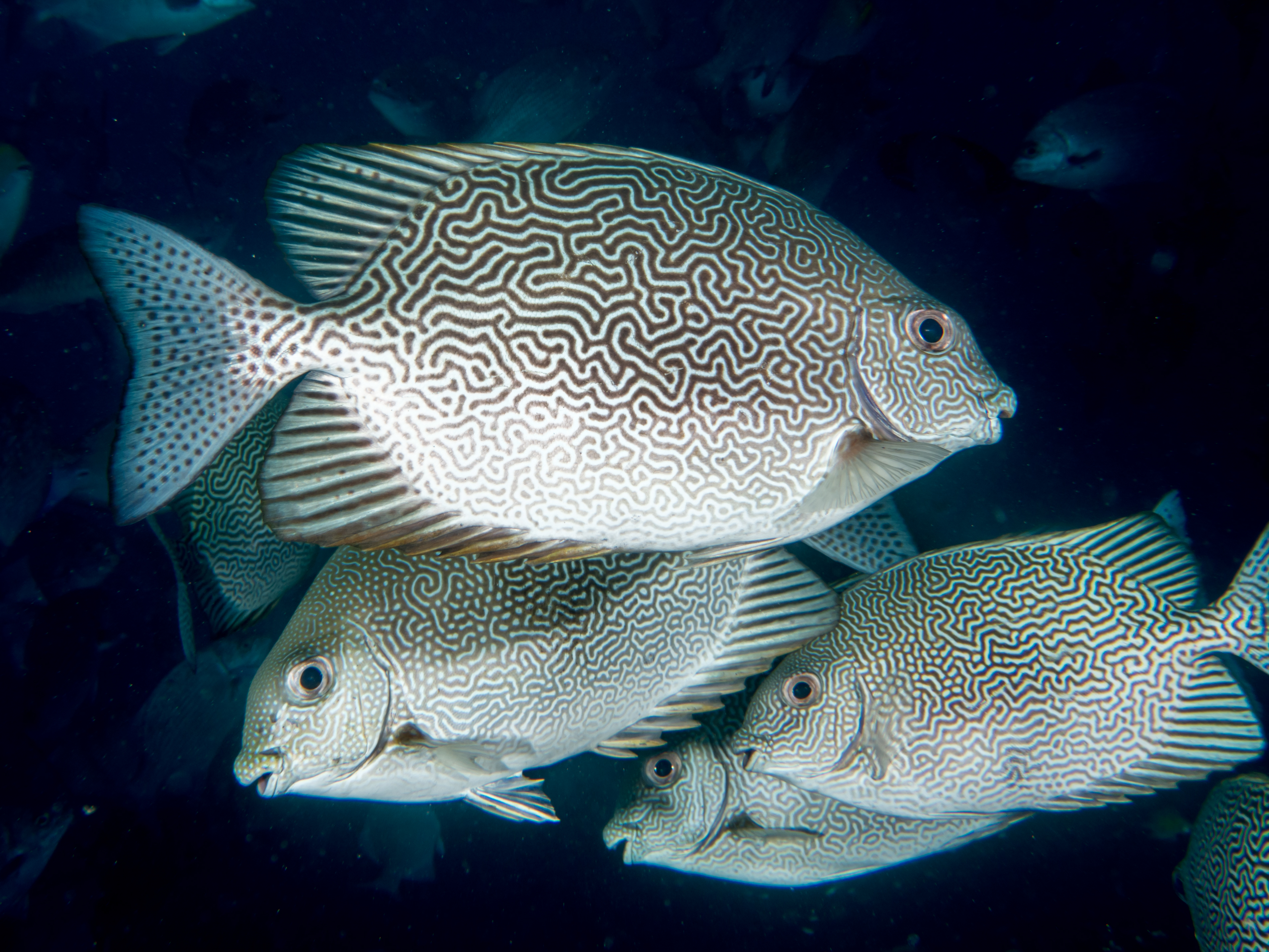
In Indonesia

The vermiculated spinefoot has a deep and laterally compressed body which has a depth which fits 1.9 to 2.2 times into its standard length. The nape is bulging with a slight indentation above each eye. The deep, blunt snout also bulges. The front nostril has a flange which is slightly widened to its rear. There is a recumbent spine to the front of the dorsal fin. Like all rabbitfishes, the dorsal fin has 13 spines and 10 soft rays, while the anal fin has 7 spines and 9 soft rays. The fin spines hold venom glands. The caudal fin is emarginate. This species attains a maximum total length of 45 cm (18 in), although 30 cm (12 in) is more typical. The body is covered in a grey and whitish complex maze-like or reticulate pattern with a patch of yellow on the head and spots on the caudal fin.

== Distribution and habitat ==
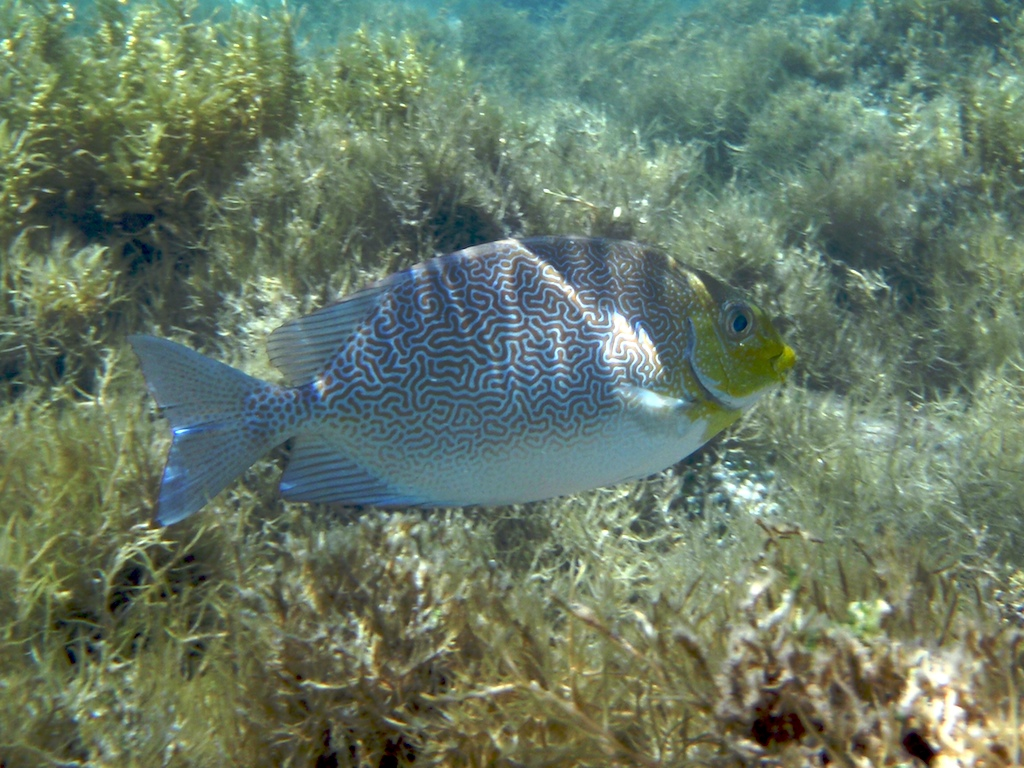
In Fiji

The vermiculated spinefoot is found from southern India and Sri Lanka eastwards into the western Pacific Ocean as far east as Palau and Guam, south to Vanuatu, Fiji and New Caledonia and Australia. In Australia it has been reported from Darnley Island and Townsville in northern Queensland but its presence in Australian waters needs to be confirmed. It is found in shallow, coastal waters, especially estuaries. Both adults and juveniles are commonest shallow, sediment-laden waters in mangroves, following the tide in and out. Adults are occasionally encountered in clear water in the vicinity of reefs or above sandy substrates.

== Biology ==
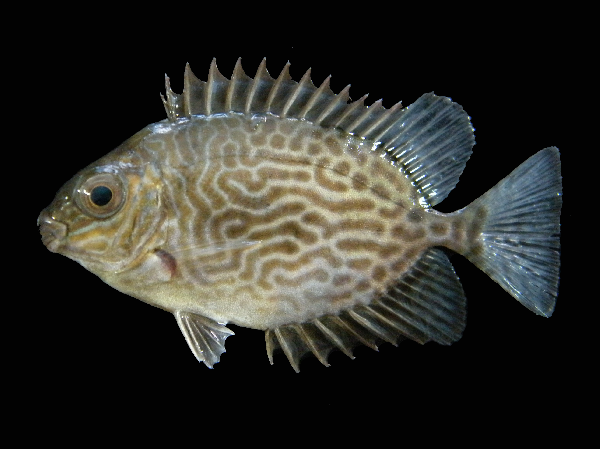
Juvenile

The vermiculated spinefoot browses algae which is growing on seagrass, the roost of mangrove and on rocks. The adults gather in aggregations of several hundred individuals to spawn in the summer, the pawn in pairs laying eggs which adhere to the substrate. The lunar cycle governs spawning behaviour.

=== Venom ===
This species produces venom in the spines of its fins. In a study of the venom of a congener (S. fuscescens) it was found that rabbitfish venom was similar to the venom of stonefishes.

== Fisheries ==
The vermiculated spinefoot is a large fast growing species and is sold fresh in markets in India, Sri Lanka and Fiji where it commpans premium prices. They are caught using nets and fixed traps.
