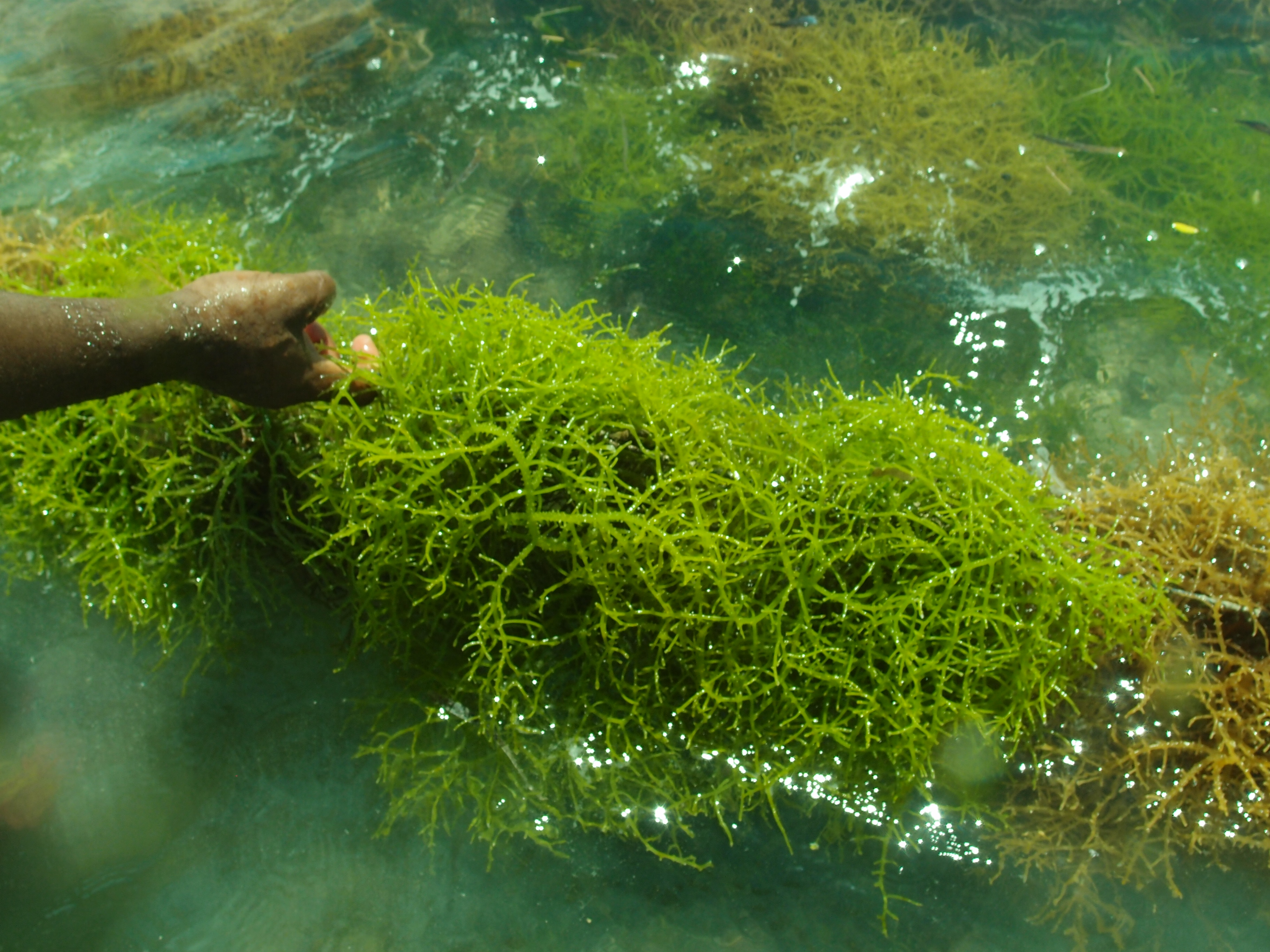
- Eucheuma denticulatum in an off-bottom cultivation, Bweleo, Zanzibar

Scientific classification
- Clade: Archaeplastida
- Division: Rhodophyta
- Class: Florideophyceae
- Order: Gigartinales
- Family: Solieriaceae
- Genus: Eucheuma
- Species: E. denticulatum

Binomial name
- Eucheuma denticulatum (N.L.Burman) F.S.Collins & A.B.Hervey

= Eucheuma denticulatum =

Species of alga

Global aquaculture production of Eucheuma denticulatum in thousand tonnes from 1975 to 2022, as reported by the FAO

Eucheuma denticulatum is a species of red algae and one of the primary sources of iota carrageenan. It exists naturally in the Philippines, tropical Asia, and the western Pacific, but for the commercial extraction of carrageenan it is usually cultivated. The species is commonly known as E. spinosum when cultivated and can be found in different colours: brown, green and red.

Cultivation of Eucheuma started in the Philippines in the early 1970s and has since been introduced to many other locations with varying results. There are different methods of cultivating E. denticulatum. One of the more common ones is the off-bottom "tie-tie"-method, with the setup being two stakes driven into the sediment with a rope between them. Pieces of the seaweed are then tied to the rope at regular intervals and allowed to grow for 6 weeks, after which it is harvested and dried.

The species was originally described in 1768 as Fucus denticulatus by Nicolaas Laurens Burman and in 1917 transferred to the genus Eucheuma by F.S. Collins and A.B. Hervey.
