= Beta-porphyranase =

Identifiers
- EC no.: 3.2.1.178

Databases
- IntEnz: IntEnz view
- BRENDA: BRENDA entry
- ExPASy: NiceZyme view
- KEGG: KEGG entry
- MetaCyc: metabolic pathway
- PRIAM: profile
- PDB structures: RCSB PDB PDBe PDBsum
Search
- PMC: articles
- PubMed: articles
- NCBI: proteins

Beta porphyranase is an enzyme responsible for the degradation of porphyran, which composes the cell wall of red algae. So far only five β-porphyranases have been identified: PorA and PorB are found in the marine bacteria Zobellia galactinovirans. A wild-type porphyranase activity has been found in Pseudoalteromonas atlantica. BpGH16B and BpGH86A have been found in the human gut bacterium, Bacteroides plebeius, of Japanese individuals.

Porphyran, the major water soluble polysaccharide of Porphyra has a linear structure composed of 4-linked α-l-galactopyranose-6-sulfate (L6S) residues and 3-linked β-d-galactopyranose (G) residues. Beta porphyranase (EC 3.2.1 178; 3= Hydrolase; 3.2= Glycosylase; 3.2.1 = Glycosidases (enzymes hydrolyzing O- and S- glycosyl compounds)) acts as a glycosidase to catalyze the following chemical reaction:

Hydrolysis of beta-D-galactopyranose-(1->4)-alpha-L-galactopyranose-6-sulfate linkages in porphyran

The backbone of porphyran consists largely (~70%) of (1->3)-linked beta-D-galactopyranose followed by (1->4)-linked alpha-L-galactopyranose-6-sulfate.

== Gut microbiome ==
CAZymes are carbohydrate active enzymes that breakdown dietary polysaccharadies and supply the human body with energy. These are absent in the human genome, but gut microbes are able to perform this process. In Japanese individuals the human gut bacterium, Bacteroides plebius, has β-porphyranase via horizontal gene transfer. Seaweed is an important component of the diet of Japanese people and the enzyme works to break down nori, the seaweed used in sushi and typically eaten for nutrition purposes. This enzyme has not been found in individuals from the West, and likely won't ever be found in their microbiome, regardless of how much seaweed is incorporated into the diet.

Not only has it been found that seaweed comprises less of the diet in Western cultures, the current treatment of food prevents the possibility of microbes being consumed. Traditionally, nori was not roasted so the associated microbes that led to horizontal gene transfer between the marine microbe on the Porphyra spp. and the gut bacterium would more easily enter the system However, now dietary seaweed is generally free of surface microbes.

== Structure ==
The most work investigating crystalline structures have been done on PorA and PorB of Zobellia galactinovirans. The L6S unit at subsite −2 is surrounded by tryptophan and arginine residues in both PorA and PorB, which construct a positively charged hydrophobic pocket that allows for a bulky sulfate group to fit.
