= Carrageenan =

Natural linear sulfated polysaccharide

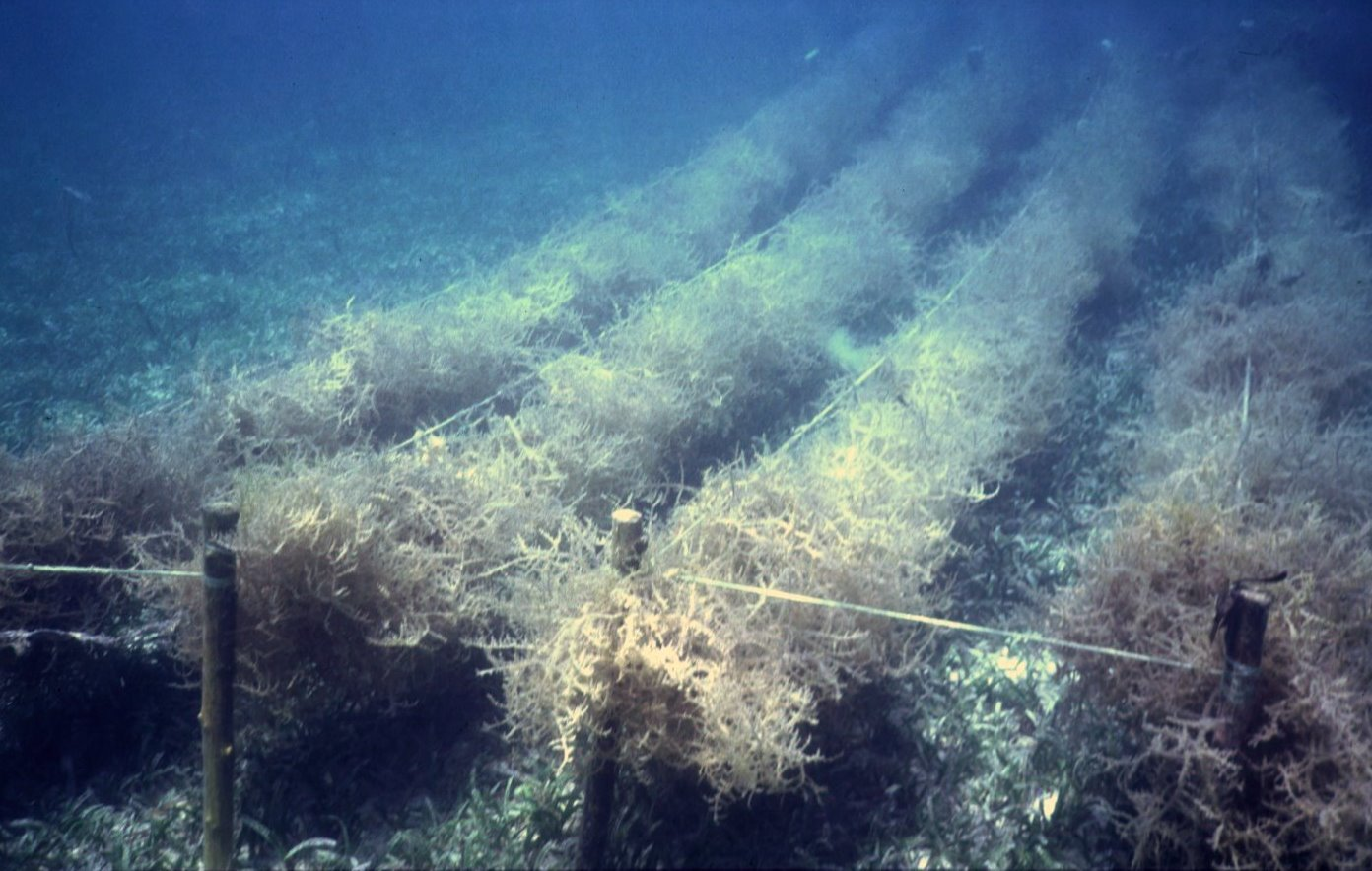
Underwater Eucheuma farming in the Philippines for carrageenan production

Carrageenans or carrageenins (/ˌkærəˈɡiːnɪns/ KARR-ə-GHEE-nins; from Irish carraigín 'sea moss') are a variety of natural linear sulfated polysaccharides. They are extracted from red edible seaweeds, of the family Solieriaceae. Carrageenans are widely used in the food industry for their gelling, thickening, and stabilizing properties. Their main application is in dairy and meat products, due to their strong binding to food proteins. Carrageenans have emerged as a promising candidate in tissue engineering and regenerative medicine applications as they resemble animal glycosaminoglycans (GAGs). They are used for tissue engineering, wound coverage, and drug delivery.

Carrageenans contain 15–40% ester-sulfate content, which makes them anionic polysaccharides. They can be mainly categorized into three classes based on their sulfate content. Kappa-carrageenan has one sulfate group per disaccharide, iota-carrageenan has two, and lambda-carrageenan has three.

A common seaweed used for manufacturing the hydrophilic colloids to produce carrageenan is Chondrus crispus (Irish moss), which is a dark red, parsley-like alga that grows attached to rocks. Gelatinous extracts of C. crispus have been used as food additives since approximately the fifteenth century. Carrageenan is a vegetarian and vegan alternative to gelatin in some applications, and is used to replace gelatin in confectionery and other food.

The first industrial commercial cultivation of Eucheuma and Kappaphycus spp. for carrageenan was developed in the Philippines in the mid-1970s. The global top producers of carrageenan are the Philippines and Indonesia. Carrageenan, along with agar, is used to produce traditional jelly desserts in the Philippines called gulaman.

No clinical evidence establishes carrageenan as an unsafe food ingredient, mainly because its fate after digestion is inadequately determined.

== Properties ==
The molecular structures of different types of carrageenan

Carrageenans are large, highly flexible molecules that form curling helical structures. This gives them the ability to form a variety of different gels at room temperature. They are widely used in the food and other industries as thickening and stabilizing agents.

All carrageenans are high-molecular-weight polysaccharides and mainly made up of alternating 3-linked β-D-galactopyranose (G-units) and 4-linked α-D-galactopyranose (D-units) or 4-linked 3,6-anhydro-α-D-galactopyranose (DA-units), forming the disaccharide repeating unit of carrageenans.

There are three main commercial classes of carrageenan:

- Kappa forms strong, rigid gels in the presence of potassium ions, and reacts with dairy proteins. It is sourced mainly from Kappaphycus alvarezii.
- Iota forms soft gels in the presence of calcium ions. It is produced mainly from Eucheuma denticulatum, and historically from Chondrus crispus.
- Lambda does not gel, and is used to thicken dairy products.

The primary differences that influence the properties of kappa, iota, and lambda carrageenan are the number and position of the ester sulfate groups on the repeating galactose units. Higher levels of ester sulfate lower the solubility temperature of the carrageenan and produce lower strength gels, or contribute to gel inhibition (lambda carrageenan).

Many red algal species produce different types of carrageenans during their developmental history. For instance, the genus Gigartina produces mainly kappa carrageenans during its gametophytic stage, and lambda carrageenans during its sporophytic stage. All are soluble in hot water, but in cold water, only the lambda form (and the sodium salts of the other two) are soluble.

When used in food products, carrageenan has the EU additive E numbers E407 or E407a when present as "processed eucheuma seaweed". Technically carrageenan is considered a dietary fibre.

In parts of Scotland and Ireland, where it is known by a variety of local and native names, Chondrus crispus is boiled in milk and strained, before sugar and other flavourings such as vanilla, cinnamon, brandy, or whisky are added. The end-product is a kind of jelly similar to panna cotta, tapioca, or blancmange.

== History ==
In pre-industrial times, carrageenan from Chondrus crispus were known to be used in Ireland since around 400 CE for animal feed and for medicinal purposes (they were boiled in milk or water and used to treat lung or chest ailments, similar to their modern pharmaceutical uses).

Carrageenan derived from Eucheuma spp. (today one of the main cultivated sources of carrageenan), known as gusô or tambalang in the Visayan languages, has also been traditionally used as food in the Philippines since before the colonial era. They were first recorded in the Diccionario De La Lengua Bisaya, Hiligueina y Haraia de la isla de Panay y Sugbu y para las demas islas (c.1637) of the Augustinian missionary Alonso de Méntrida (in Spanish). In the book, Méntrida describes gusô as being cooked until it melts, and then allowed to congeal into a sour dish.

Small-scale commercial utilization of carrageenans began in the late 19th century. They were initially used to create medicines to provide relief for respiratory and gastrointestinal ailments, but they eventually also became recognized for their culinary applications as a gelling agent in food processing.

Large-scale tropical seaweed farming was pioneered in the 1950s in Cebu, Philippines, after the accidental introduction of Caulerpa lentillifera to fish ponds on the island of Mactan. This was further developed by local research, particularly through the efforts of the Filipino marine biologist Gavino Trono, since recognized as a National Scientist of the Philippines. Local research and experimental cultures led to the development of the first commercial farming methods for other warm-water algae (since cold-water red and brown edible algae favored in East Asia do not grow in the tropics), including the first successful commercial cultivation of carrageenan-producing algae. These include Eucheuma spp., Kappaphycus alvarezii, Gracilaria spp., and Halymenia durvillei.

By the mid-1970s, carrageenans began to be produced on an industrial scale in the Philippines which could meet the global demands for processed foods. The Philippines was the world's largest producer of carrageenan for several decades until it was overtaken by Indonesia in 2008.

== Production ==
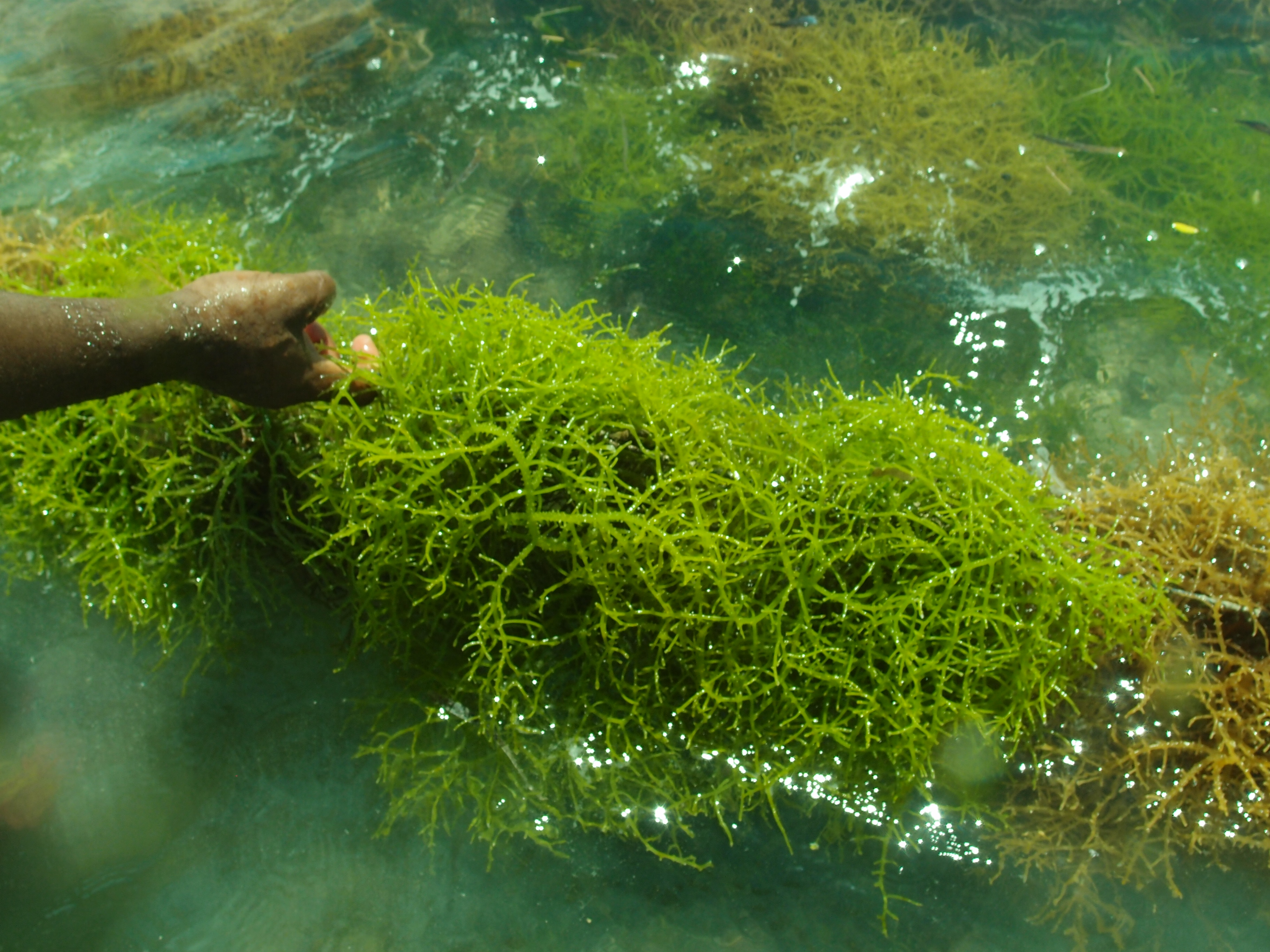
Eucheuma denticulatum being farmed for iota-carrageenan in an off-bottom cultivation in Tanzania

The most commonly used sources are Eucheuma cottonii, Kappaphycus alvarezii, and Eucheuma spinosum, which together provide about three-quarters of the world production. These grow from the sea surface to a depth of about 2 m (6.6 ft). The seaweed is normally grown on nylon lines strung between bamboo floats, and it is harvested after three months or so, when each plant weighs approximately 1 kg (2.2 lb).

After harvest, the seaweed is dried, baled, and sent to the carrageenan manufacturer. There the seaweed is ground, sifted to remove impurities such as sand, and washed thoroughly. After treatment with hot alkali solution (e.g., 5–8% potassium hydroxide), the cellulose is removed from the carrageenan by centrifugation and filtration. The resulting carrageenan solution is then concentrated by evaporation. It is dried and ground to specification.

There are three types of industrial processing:

=== Semi-refined ===
This is only produced from E. cottonii or E. spinosum. The raw weed is first sorted and crude contaminants are removed by hand. The weed is then washed to remove salt and sand, and then cooked in hot alkali to increase the gel strength. The cooked weed is washed, dried, and milled. E. spinosum undergoes a much milder cooking cycle, as it dissolves quite readily. The product is called semi-refined carrageenan, Philippines natural grade, or, in the U.S., it simply falls under the common carrageenan specification.

                           cleaned and washed seaweed 
                                   ↓
                                extraction
                                   ↓
                             coarse filtration   → seaweed residue
                                   ↓ 
                              fine filtration    → used filter aids
                                   ↓
            ↓-------------- concentration --------------↓
   preparation with KCl                        preparation with alcohol
            ↓                                           ↓
       gel pressing                                alcohol recovery 
            ↓                                           ↓
         drying                                      drying
            ↓                                           ↓ 
         milling                                     milling 
            ↓                                           ↓ 
         blending                                    blending
            ↓                                           ↓
    gel refined carrageenan                     refined carrageenan

=== Refined ===
The essential difference in the refining process is that the carrageenan is first dissolved and filtered to remove cell wall debris. The carrageenan is then precipitated from the clear solution, either by isopropyl alcohol (propan-2-ol) or by potassium chloride.

=== Mixed processing ===
A hybrid technology in which seaweed is treated heterogeneously as in the semirefined process exists, but alcohol or high salt levels are used to inhibit dissolution. This process is often used on South American seaweeds and gives some of the cost benefits of semirefined processing, while allowing a wider range of seaweeds to be processed, however, the naturally low cellulose levels in some South American seaweeds allow them to be heterogeneously processed and still be sold under the EU refined specification.

=== Grades ===
There are two basic grades of carrageenan, refined (RC) and semi-refined (SRC). The latter is also known as "processed Eucheuma seaweed" (PES) and "Philippine natural grade" (PNG) carrageenan. In the European Union, refined carrageenan is designated by the E number E-407 and semi-refined carrageenan as E-407a. Refined carrageenan has a 2% maximum for acid-insoluble material and is produced by alcohol precipitation or potassium chloride gel press process. Semi-refined carrageenan has a much higher cellulose content and is produced in a less complex process. Indonesia, the Philippines, and Chile are three main sources of raw material and extracted carrageenan.

== Uses and applications ==
=== Food and other domestic uses ===
Carrageenan is widely used to improve the texture (by gelling and increasing viscosity) and appearance of food and beverages, especially dairy products, sweets, jellies, and processed meats. Specific uses include:

- Desserts, jellies, syrups, salad dressings and jams
- Dairy products: including ice cream, yogurts, soft cheeses and chocolate milk
- Sauces: to increase viscosity
- Beer: for flocculation, clarifies by removing haze-causing proteins
- Pâtés and processed meats (e.g., ham): substitute for fat, increase water retention, increase volume, or improve slicing
- Soy milk and other plant milks: to thicken
- Diet sodas: to enhance texture and suspend flavours
- Pet food
- Toothpaste: thickener, stabilizer to prevent constituents separating
- Vegetarian hot dogs
- Shampoo and cosmetic creams: thickener
- Personal lubricants
- Air freshener gels
- Fire fighting foam: thickener to cause foam to become sticky
- Marbling: the ancient art of paper and fabric marbling uses a carrageenan mixture on which to float paints or inks; the paper or fabric is then laid on it, absorbing the colours
- Shoe polish: to increase viscosity
- Biotechnology: to immobilize cells and enzymes
- Pharmaceuticals: used as an inactive excipient in pills and tablets

== Regulatory status ==
In the U.S., carrageenan is allowed under FDA regulations as a direct food additive and is generally regarded as safe when used as an emulsifier, stabilizer, or thickener in foods, except those standardized foods that do not provide for such use. FDA reviewed carrageenan safety for infant formula. The European Food Safety Authority concluded "there is no evidence of any adverse effects in humans from exposure to food-grade carrageenan, or that exposure to degraded carrageenan from use of food-grade carrageenan is occurring". The Joint FAO/WHO expert committee on food additives stated in a July 2014 review "that the use of carrageenan in infant formula or formula for special medical purposes at concentrations up to 1000 mg/L is not of concern".

Although the US National Organic Program (NOP) added carrageenan to its National List of additives allowed to be included in organic foods in 2003, and reauthorized it in 2008, noting it as "critical to organic production and handling operations", on November 18, 2016, the NOP's National Organic Standards Board (NOSB) voted to recommend carrageenan be removed from the National List. On April 4, 2018, the Agricultural Marketing Service (AMS) (USDA) announced the renewal of carrageenan on the National List, allowing its continued use in food products. The document states,

The NOSB recommended removing carrageenan because they determined that alternative materials, such as gellan gum, guar gum, or xanthan gum, are available for use in organic products ... AMS found sufficient evidence in public comments to the NOSB that carrageenan continues to be necessary for handling agricultural products because of the unavailability of wholly natural substitutes (§ 6517(c)(1)(ii)). Carrageenan has specific uses in an array of agricultural products, and public comments reported that potential substitutes do not adequately replicate the functions of carrageenan across the broad scope of use. Therefore, carrageenan continues to meet the OFPA criteria for inclusion on the National List.

The use of carrageenan in infant formula is prohibited in the EU for precautionary reasons, but is permitted in other food items. In 2018, the European Food Safety Authority (EFSA) reported that safety of carrageenan in food products is based 75 mg/kg body weight per day.

In the UK, the Food Standards Agency issued a product recall for sweets containing carrageenan, stating that carrageenan "is not permitted as an ingredient in jelly confectionery products as it presents a choking hazard".

In a 2015 review, the Joint Expert Committee of the Food and Agriculture Organization of the United Nations and World Health Organization on Food Additives reported on the use of carrageenan in infant formula stating that the additive was "not of concern" as food for special medical purposes at concentrations up to 1000 milligrams per litre.

== Research ==
In 2018, carrageenan was deemed non-toxic by the EFSA under certain consumption levels (75 mg/kg of body weight per day), although further research was recommended, mainly focused on the fate of carrageenan during and after digestion, and on any subsequent metabolites.

In a 2024 analysis of 104,139 adults from the French NutriNet-Santé prospective cohort, higher consumption of carrageenan was associated with an increased risk of type 2 diabetes.

== See also ==
- Agar
- List of food additives
- Pectin
- Alginic acid
- Poligeenan, degraded carrageenan
