= Porphyran =

Sulfated carbohydrate polymer

Porphyran is a sulfated carbohydrate derived from red algae of the genus Porphyra.

== Composition ==
Porphyran is a complex sulfated carbohydrate. It is a highly substituted complex carbohydrate related to agarose with a linear backbone consisting of 3-linked beta-D-galactosyl units alternating with either 4-linked alpha-L-galactosyl 6-sulfate or 3,6-anhydro-alpha-L-galactosyl units. The composition includes 6-O-sulfated L-galactose, 6-O-methylated D-galactose, L-galactose, 3,6-anhydro-L-galactose, 6-O-methyl D-galactose and ester sulfate. Some of the ester is present as 1-4-linked L-galactose 6-sulfate. The precise composition of porphyran shows seasonal and environmental variations. In Pyropia haitanensis, the L-residues are mainly composed of alpha-L-galactosyl 6-sulfate units, and the 3,6-anhydro-galactosyl units are minor. In Porphyra capensis, the ratio of alpha-L-galactose-6-sulfate and the 3,6-anhydrogalactose is 1.2:1. Porphyran is converted to agarose by cyclization of L-galactose-6-sulfate to 3,6-anhydro-L-galactose.

== See also ==
- Fucoidan
- Agarose
