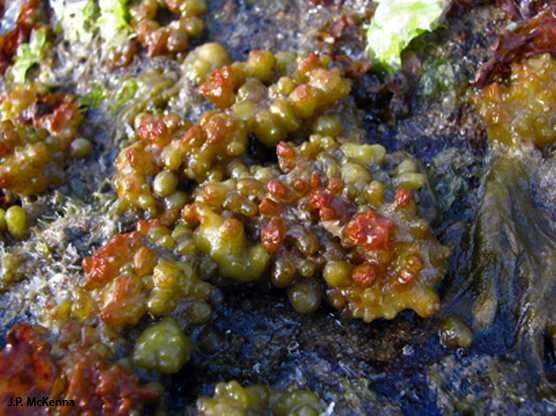
- Sea bubble (Colpomenia sinuosa), Cabrillo National Monument tidepools, San Diego, California, USA

Scientific classification
- Domain: Eukaryota
- Supergroup: Stramenopiles
- Division: Ochrophyta
- Class: Phaeophyceae
- Order: Ectocarpales
- Family: Scytosiphonaceae
- Genus: Colpomenia
- Species: C. sinuosa

Binomial name
- Colpomenia sinuosa (Mertens ex Roth) Derbès & Solier in Castagne 1851

Synonyms
- Ulva sinuosa Mertens ex Roth 1806; Encoelium sinuosum (Mertens ex Roth) C.Agardh 1820; Soranthera leathesiæformis H.Crouan & P.Crouan; Stilophora sinuosa (Mertens ex Roth) C.Agardh 1827; Asperococcus sinuosus (Mertens ex Roth) Bory de Saint-Vincent 1832; Asperococcus sinuosus (C.Agardh) Zanardini 1841; Hydroclathrus sinuosus (Mertens ex Roth) Zanardini 1843

= Colpomenia sinuosa =

Species of seaweed

Colpomenia sinuosa, commonly named the oyster thief or sinuous ballweed, is a brown algae species in the genus Colpomenia. It is the type species of its genus and is widespread in tropical to temperate zones around the world.

It is superficially similar to the Colpomenia peregrina species and in older texts, such as Knight and Parke (1931), C. peregrina is referred to as C. sinuosa.

Colpomenia sinuosa contains the C6-C4-C6 phenolic compound colpol.

== Distribution ==
This species is common in the intertidal and on reef flats, often growing on other algae or rocky substrates. In Hawaiʻi it is found from the mid intertidal to about 20m depth. It can be found in New Zealand in the northeastern coasts of the North Island, the Kermadec Islands, and the Marlborough Sounds.
