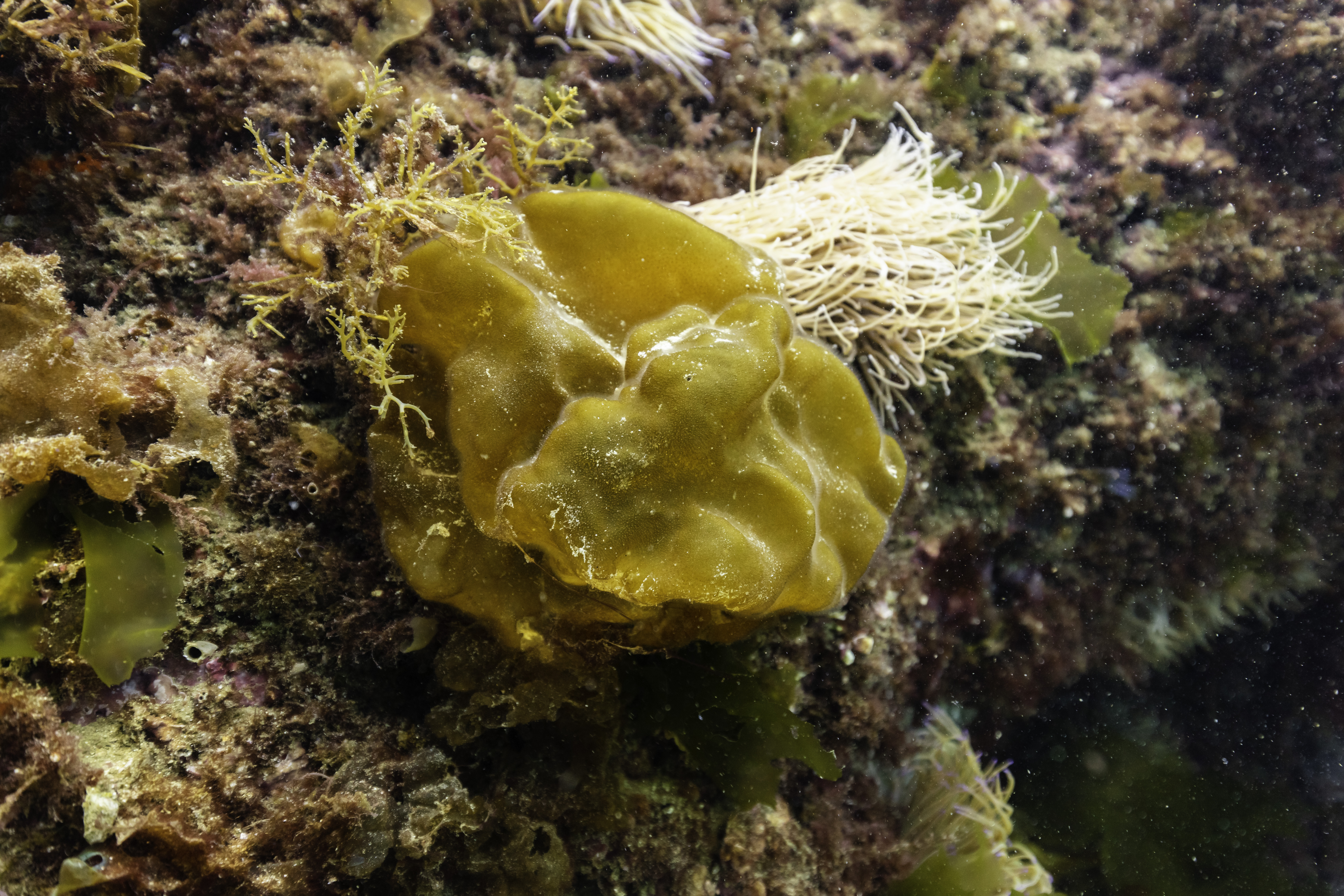

Scientific classification
- Domain: Eukaryota
- Clade: Sar
- Clade: Stramenopiles
- Division: Ochrophyta
- Class: Phaeophyceae
- Order: Ectocarpales
- Family: Scytosiphonaceae
- Genus: Colpomenia
- Species: C. peregrina

Binomial name
- Colpomenia peregrina Sauvageau

= Colpomenia peregrina =

Species of seaweed

Colpomenia peregrina, sometimes referred to by its vernacular names oyster thief and bladder weed, is a species of brown seaweed.

This species is native to the Eastern Pacific Ocean, but has been introduced to other areas. It was first noticed in Europe in 1906 on oyster beds. It has now been recorded throughout the eastern north Atlantic, from Norway and Sweden to Portugal. It was first recorded in Britain in 1908 and in Ireland in 1934.

== Description ==
Colpomenia peregrina (syn. Colpomenia sinuosa (Mertens ex Roth) Derbès et Solier var. peregrina Sauvageau) is a small brown alga, bladder-like, hollow and membranous, up to 9 cm across. The surface is thin and smooth but often collapsed or torn when older. Olive brown in colour and attached by rhizoidal filaments to rock at the base. There are two species in Europe: C. sinuosa (Mert.) Derb. & Sol. and C. peregrina (Sauvageau) Hamel. C. sinuosa was present at least as far back as the 1840s in Spain, and C.peregrina was introduced and first noticed by oyster fishermen in the Bay of Biscay in 1906. It was first noticed in Britain in 1907 in Cornwall and Dorset. The two species are superficially similar and in older texts, such as Knight and Parke (1931), C.peregrina is referred to as C.sinuosa.

Similar species: Leathesia difformis is a similar species: it is yellow brown in colour, fleshy and mucilaginous in texture. It is globose and smooth when young, becoming hollow and convoluted with age and growing to 5 cm in diameter. However, L. difformis is easily distinguished from C. peregrina, because L. difformis readily squashes when pressed between finger and thumb.

== Habitat ==
This species is found in littoral rock pools, in localities that are not exposed, and also in the sublittoral to a depth of 3m.

== Distribution ==
North America (west coast)

This species occurs from Alaska to La Jolla, in Southern California.

Europe

Colpomenia peregrina was first recorded in Europe in 1908. It was also recorded from the Mediterranean.

British Isles

This seaweed is not native to the British Isles, but is found generally in this area. In Hardy and Guiry (2006) it is shown to be generally recorded around Ireland, south west England, Wales and the west coast of Scotland. Records from the east of Scotland are few, and it not shown as present on the east or south east coast of England. It is noted as a recent addition to the flora (as C. sinuosa in Knight and Parke (1931).

Ireland

Colpomenia peregrina has been recorded in Ireland since 1934. It has been recorded in Ireland from the following counties: Down, Donegal, Kerry, Galway, Clare and Cork. Apparently this alga was first recorded in Ireland by M. J. Lynn from Strangford Lough in March 1934, and from Larne Lough near Ballycarry and Magheramorne in 1935. It was also recorded from Portballintrae, on the north coast, and in the south at Lough Ine. In 1936 it was found at Rush, County Dublin and at Killough, County Down. There are further records from: Portstewart, County Londonderry, cast ashore at Hood's Ferry, Islandmagee (opposite Larne) in County Antrim. It is now abundant. Specimens of this species are stored in the Ulster Museum Herbarium (BEL) from: County Donegal in the Republic of Ireland; Northern Ireland and Wales under the catalogue museum numbers: F11254; F3136; F7675; F6154; F1682; F1693; F7491; F7674; F4254; F4254 and F1832.

New Zealand

Colpomenia peregrina is found in intertidal to subtidal zones of the coasts of the North and South Islands.
