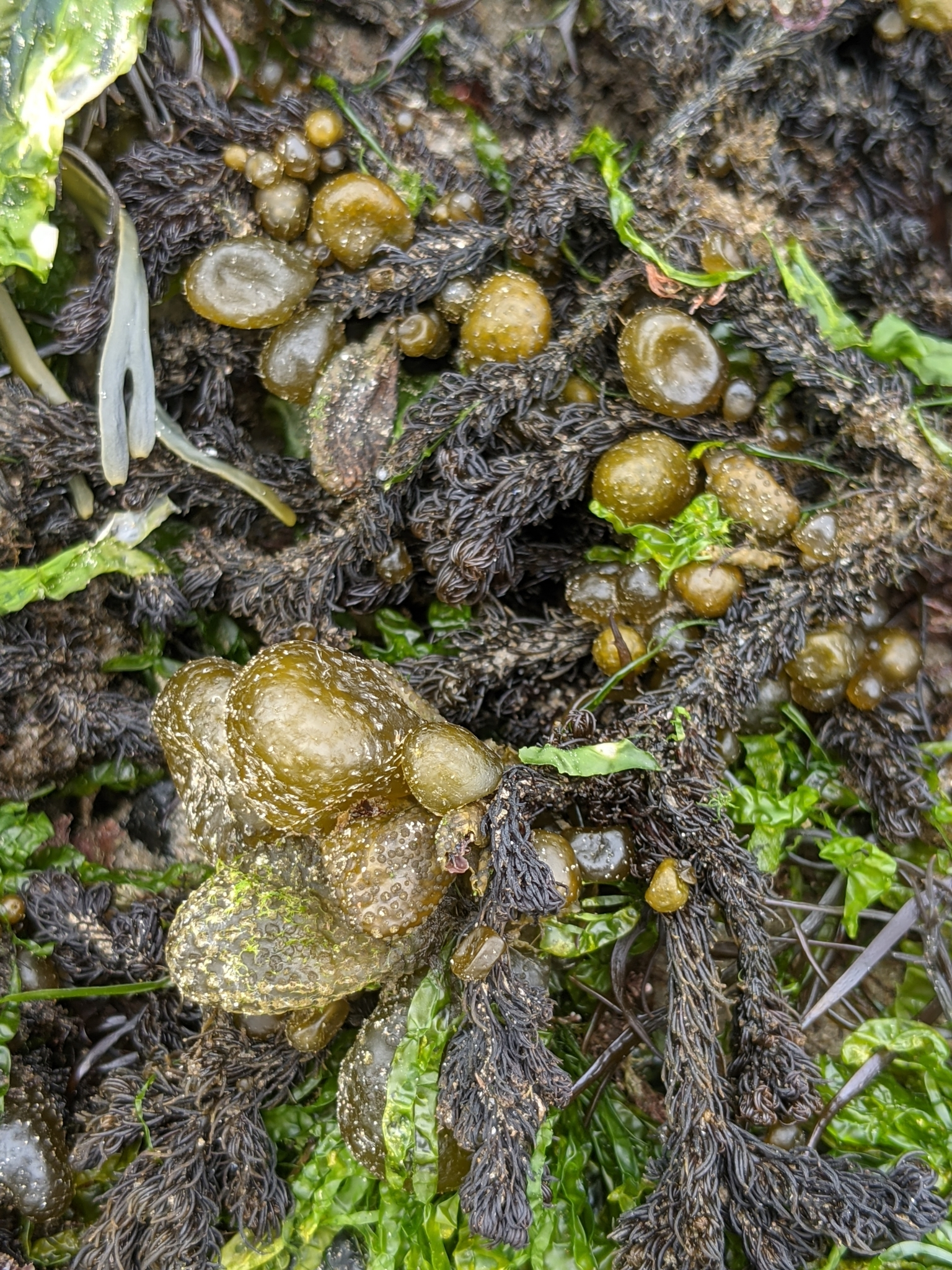

Scientific classification
- Domain: Eukaryota
- Clade: Diaphoretickes
- Clade: Sar
- Clade: Stramenopiles
- Phylum: Gyrista
- Subphylum: Ochrophytina
- Class: Phaeophyceae
- Order: Ectocarpales
- Family: Chordariaceae
- Genus: Soranthera; Postels & Ruprecht, 1840
- Species: S. ulvoidea

Binomial name
- Soranthera ulvoidea Postels & Ruprecht, 1840

Forms
- Soranthera ulvoidea f. difformis Setchell & N.L.Gardner, 1903; Soranthera ulvoidea f. typica Setchell & N.L.Gardner, 1903

Synonyms
- Asperococcus ulvoides (Postels & Ruprecht) Ruprecht 1850

= Soranthera ulvoidea =

Species of Phaeophyceae

Soranthera ulvoidea, sometimes called the studded sea balloon, is a species of brown algae in the family Chordariaceae. It is the only species in the monotypic genus Soranthera. The generic name Soranthera is from the Greek soros (heap) and antheros (blooming). The specific epithet ulvoidea refers to certain resemblances the algae has with Ulva. The name in Japanese is 千島袋のり / ちしまふろくのり (tisima-hukuronori or chishima-fukuronori) literally meaning "Kuril Islands bag nori".

== Description ==
True to its common name, studded sea balloons are pale green to olive, ovoid sacs 3–5 centimetres (1.2–2.0 in) in diameter with small brown bumps on the surface. The bumpy 'studs' are the sori, which produce the zoosporangia. The sori are darker and measure 1 mm in diameter. There are groupings of multicellular hyaline 'hairs' in the center of the sori. The clavate to ovoid unangia (the unilocular reproductive structures or sporangia) are 78-100 μm long. The paraphyses are pluricellular (6-14 cells), also clavate, and almost double the length of the unangia. It has polystichous sporophytes.

In juveniles, the 'balloons' are solid, but in adults they are hollow and pop when squeezed. Thalli are 1–5 centimetres (0.39–1.97 in) tall. The small, discoid holdfast underneath is barely noticeable and can include rhizoids. The rhizoids wrap around the thallus of the host, and will penetrate host tissue in structures resembling haustoria. However, these structures are not haustoria as S. ulvoidea is not parasitic; the holdfast is merely filling cavities in damaged areas of the host with no intermingling of cells.

The earliest recognizable sign of the algae are tiny semicircular outgrowths among the stichidia on hosts such as Neorhodomela larix.

S. ulvoidea resembles immature Leathesia, but when popped the thallus will smash together and not fall apart into filaments. It is also said to resemble Colpomenia sinuosa f. deformans and other Colpomenia species, especially when young.

== Taxonomy ==
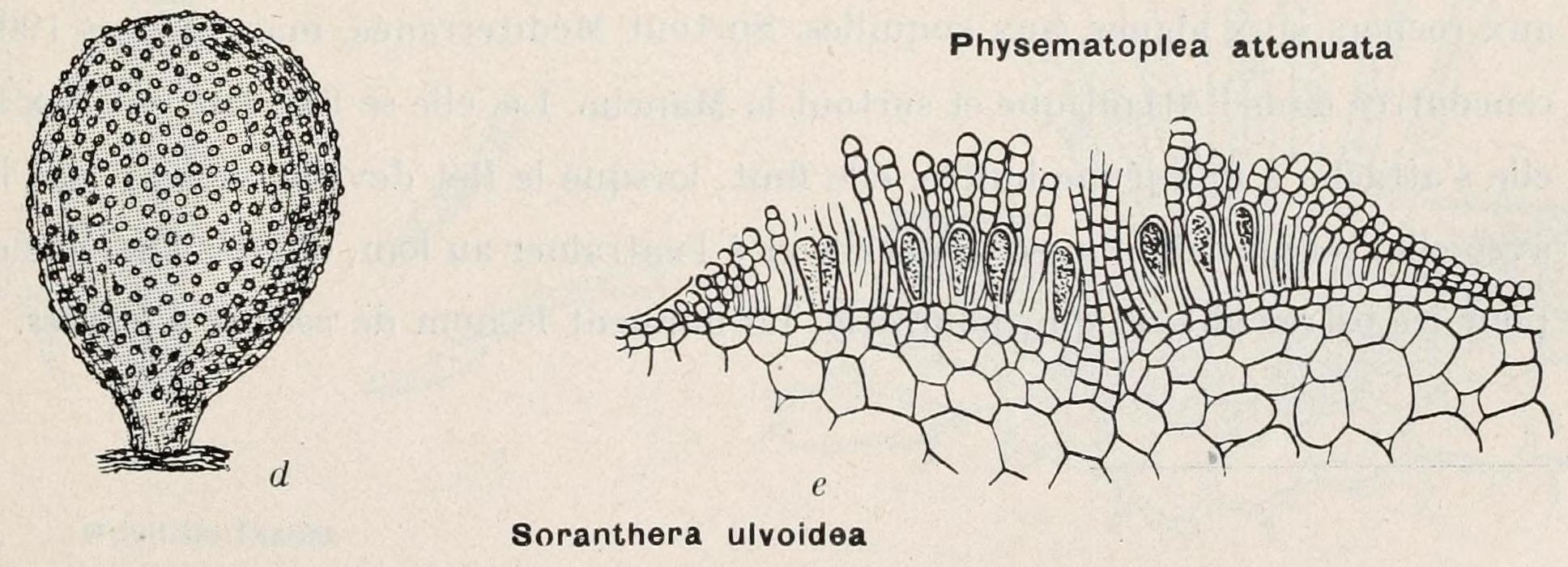
Illustrations of Soranthera ulvoidea

William Albert Setchell and Nathan Lyon Gardner describe two forms of the species.

Soranthera ulvoidea f. typica is the typical form for the species as originally described by Alexander Postels and Franz Josef Ruprecht with a regular ovoid or globular shape. It is more common than the other form is in the southern part of the range.

Soranthera ulvoidea f. difformis has fronds that have deep and sometimes irregular lobes. It is usually found in muddy or brackish water.

Isabella Aiona Abbott notes that individuals growing on Odonthalia tend to be narrowly attached, thin walled, and obovoid, growing from central California up to Alaska. Those that have Neorhodomela as a host tend to be attached more broadly, thick walled, spherical, and occurring primarily in northern or central California. She, however, does not apply names to these forms.

Soranthera leathesiæformis was placed in the genus at one time by Hippolyte Marie Crouan and Pierre Louis Crouan, however examination of the specimen showed that it is Colpomenia sinuosa and not part of Soranthera.

A 2005 phylogenetic analysis showed no genetic evidence to support any infraspecific taxa or other species besides S. ulvoidea, despite the morphological differences of the forms. The study also noted that Botrytella micromorus (=Sorocarpus micromorus) is a close sibling taxon, as shown in their maximum likelihood tree of Chordariaceae:

- Chordariaceae
  - - Coelocladia arctica
    - Streblonema maculans
  - - Isthmoplea sphaerophora
    - - Myriotrichia clavaeformis
      - - - - Punctaria latifolia
            - Delamarea attenuata
          - - Striata attenuata
            - Asperococcus fistulosus
        - - - Dictyosiphon foeniculaceus
            - - Hummia onusta
              - Giraudia sphacelaroides
          - - Chordaria flagelliformis
            - - Sphaerotricia divaricata
              - - Botrytella micromorus
                - Soranthera ulvoidea

A 2011 study found a compatible tree using different representative species.

- Chordariaceae
  - Myrionema papilosum
  - - - Myractula clandestina
      - Elachista fucicola
    - - Striaria attenuata
      - - - Litosiphon laminariae
          - Elachista flaccida
        - - Elachista scutulata
          - - - Punctaria latifolia
              - Asperococcus bullosus
            - - - Ulonema rhizophorum
                - Myrionema strangulans
              - - Ddictyosiphon foeniculaceus
                - - - Leathesia difformis
                    - Corynophlaea crispa
                  - - Chordaria flagelliformis
                    - Soranthera ulvoidea

== Habitat ==
Studded sea balloon is found in the North Pacific Ocean on the west coast of North America, from Punto San Jose, Baja California, in the south up through the Aleutian Islands, Bering Sea, Commander Islands, and Kuril Islands (down to Shikotan) to the north and west. The type specimen was collected off of Baranof Island.

It grows in protected or partially exposed areas of the low to high intertidal zone, and even in tide pools. Although typically found growing as an epiphyte, it also grows on rocks (epilithic) and sand.

== Ecology ==
S. ulvoidea grows mainly as an epiphyte. Some of its common hosts include Odonthalia floccosa and Odonthalia aleutica. The type specimen was found growing on Neorhodomela larix. It also grows on other species of Odonthalia and Neorhodomela, which are all perennial red algae in the Rhodomelaceae family. The epiphytic relationship is thought to be beneficial to the host. Though the relationship was once thought to be parasitic, it is decidedly an epiphyte only. This contrasts with Harveyella, which also uses Odonthalia and Rhodomela as hosts but is a true parasite.

S. ulvoidea is fed on by herbivores such as amphipods, Littorina, and Idotea.

A study on the ecological impacts of ferry traffic at the Canadian Gulf Islands in British Columbia indicated that Soranthera is negatively affected by wakes, despite one of its hosts (Odonthalia floccosa) only being found at wake-impacted test sites.

Methanolic extract of S. ulvoidea has been shown to inhibit Potato virus X (PXV) on lesions of Chenopodium quinoa.
