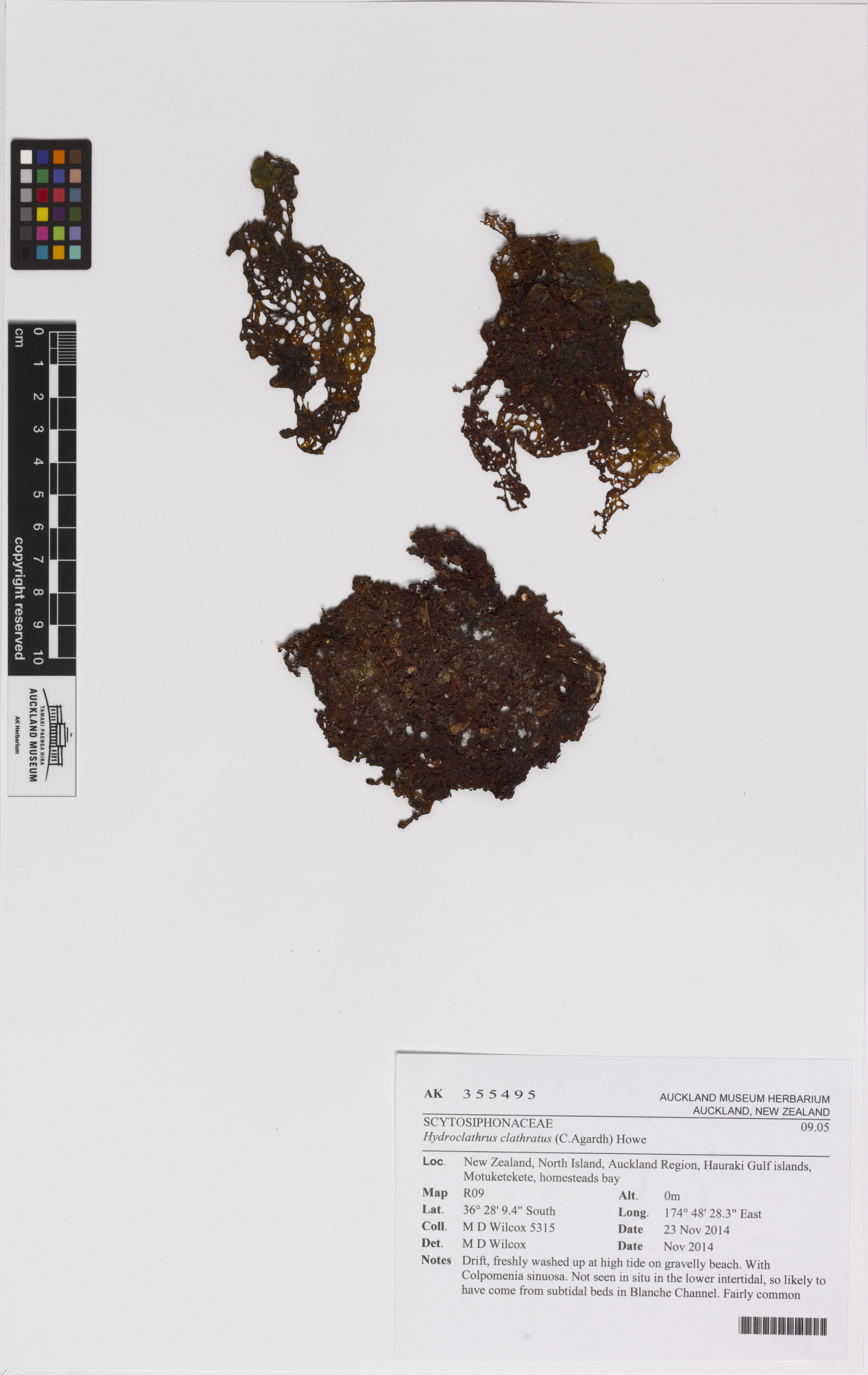

Scientific classification
- Domain: Eukaryota
- Clade: Sar
- Clade: Stramenopiles
- Division: Ochrophyta
- Class: Phaeophyceae
- Order: Ectocarpales
- Family: Scytosiphonaceae
- Genus: Hydroclathrus
- Species: H. clathratus

Binomial name
- Hydroclathrus clathratus (C.Agardh) M.Howe

= Hydroclathrus clathratus =

Species of brown algae

Hydroclathrus clathratus is a species of brown algae, of the phylum Ochrophyta. It is a yellowish-brown net-like algae that can be found in almost every ocean.

== Description ==
Hydroclathratus clathratus is formed as a porous netlike masses with a range in color from light tan or yellow to medium brown, typically 10-25 cm in diameter with a height of 3-15 cm. They are generally spherical and hollow as it develops, becoming very convoluted with countless perforations of varying sizes and shapes. Typically though, these perforations are round or oval shaped holes that range in layout and can be 2 mm to 4 cm long.

== Distribution and habitat ==
This species is widespread and can be found from temperate to tropical areas in the Atlantic and Indo-Pacific. They are typically in shallow reef flats and mid- to low-depth intertidal pools. They can sometimes be found in high intertidal pools, and can be found as deep as 33m. They are frequently found growing on rocks, with mixed species, or as epiphytes.

== Human use ==
Hydroclathratus clathratus are sometimes used for human consumption, typically in salads. It is also used as animal feed and fertilizer.
