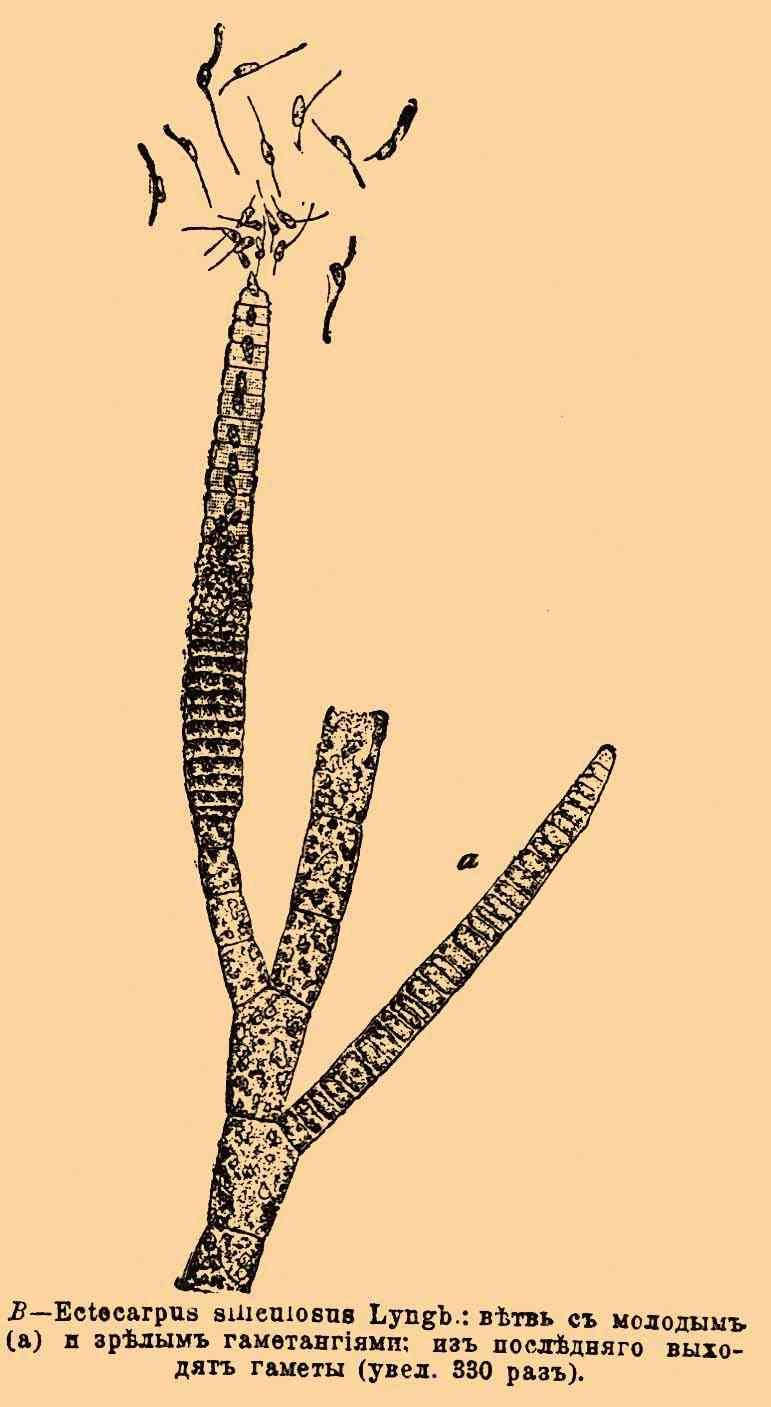
- E. siliculosus, from the Brockhaus and Efron Encyclopedic Dictionary (1890-1907)

Scientific classification
- Domain: Eukaryota
- Supergroup: Stramenopiles
- Division: Ochrophyta
- Class: Phaeophyceae
- Order: Ectocarpales
- Family: Ectocarpaceae
- Genus: Ectocarpus; Lyngbye 1819

= Ectocarpus =

Genus of seaweeds

Ectocarpus is a genus of filamentous brown alga that includes a model organism for the genomics of multicellularity. Among possible model organisms in the brown algae, Ectocarpus was selected for the relatively small size of its mature thallus and the speed with which it completes its life cycle. Tools available for Ectocarpus as a model species include a high quality genome sequence and both forward and reverse genetic methodologies, the latter based on CRISPR-Cas9.

== Taxonomy and Nomenclature ==
Brown algae are heterokonts, a group that also includes diatoms and oomycetes. Despite their simple filamentous thalli, the Ectocarpales are part of the crown group of brown algal orders and are a sister group to the order Laminariales (kelps). The type species for the genus is Ectocarpus siliculosus (Dillwyn) Lyngbye. In 1809, Dillwyn described Ectocarpus as Conferva siliculosa based on specimens collected by W.J. Hooker from Norfolk and East Sussex. In 1819, Lyngbye subsequently described Ectocarpus using a specimen from Denmark, citing C. siliculosa Dilwyn as its basionym.

Major taxonomic databases such as AlgaeBase, the World Register of Marine Species (WoRMS), and the Catalogue of Life (CoL) currently list more than 40 accepted species within Ectocarpus. Most of these names originate from nineteenth- and early-twentieth-century descriptions based solely on morphology, which is now known to be highly plastic and taxonomically unreliable in this group.

Historically, the commonly accepted European classification recognized only two widespread species: Ectocarpus siliculosus and Ectocarpus fasciculatus. Nevertheless, reproductive barriers have been reported between isolates from different geographic regions. Modern molecular studies have substantially revised the understanding of species diversity in the genus. In 2010 Peters et al. reinstated Ectocarpus crouaniorum Thuret as a third common species based on evidence of pre- and post-zygotic isolation and genetic divergence from E. siliculosus. E. subulatus Kützing was subsequently proposed for reinstatement in 2015, based on more than 6% 5′-COI sequence divergence from E. siliculosus and its distinctive high abiotic stress tolerance, including elevated temperature and low salinity.

Sequence-based analyses of 729 individuals in 2016 further revealed cryptic diversity within the siliculosi subgroup, and supported the recognition of at least 15 distinct species-level lineages. These included E. siliculosus and E. crouaniorum, and 13 unnamed lineages (designated Ectocarpus sp.1 through Ectocarpus sp.13), which include the genomic model strain Ectocarpus sp.7 Ec32.

As a result, contemporary molecular research recognizes far fewer well-supported species than the numbers found in traditional nomenclatural databases. The taxonomic status of many historically described species remains unresolved, and ongoing revisions are expected as additional molecular data and type material assessments become available.

== Morphology ==
Studies on morphology have been limited for Ectocarpus as only two species in the genera (E. siliculosus and E. fasciculatus) are well-described based on morphology and genetic sequence.

Ectocarpus is a filamentous alga that can grow up to 30 cm. Cultured specimens in the laboratory tend to be fertile when they are 1–3 cm in length. Ectocarpus has a normal, branched appearance in unialgal cultures, but in axenic cultures it has a ball-shaped appearance suggesting that bacterial symbionts are required for the alga to attain normal morphology.

== Distribution ==
Ectocarpus can be found across the globe, in temperate shorelines growing as epiphytes on other flora (e.g. seagrass, other alga) or on rocky substrates (epilithic). While commonly attached to a substrate, thalli of Ectocarpus may also survive while floating. Ectocarpus are more commonly found as epiphytes on marine macroflora rather than epilithic. E. fasciculatus is known as an endophyte of Laminaria digitata, but no study has documented how it bypasses the kelp's defense. E. crouaniorum are found in the intertidal zone while E. siliculosus and E. fasciculatus can be found in mid-intertidal and subtidal zones, respectively.

== Ecology ==
Ectocarpus thalli tend to shelter several marine invertebrates (e.g. crustaceans and nematodes) and some protists. Temperature affects the life cycle of some strains. A study of the life cycles of natural populations in NW France and SW Italy found marked isomorphy between generations in some populations and evidence of populations with modified, asexual life cycles.

== Life History ==
In the laboratory, the life history is an isomorphic to slightly heteromorphic alternation of generations, but asexual strains also exist. Ectocarpus has a haploid-diploid life cycle with both sporophyte and gametophyte generations. It can complete its whole life cycle within 3 months in the laboratory. Diploid sporophytes give rise to haploid meiospores which will then produce a haploid gametophyte generation. These gametophytes are dioecious, producing either male or female gametes, which fuse to produce diploid zygotes, restarting the sporophyte stage. Parthenogenesis may also occur when a gamete does not find a gamete of the opposite sex, producing a parthenosporophyte. Deployment of the sporophyte developmental program requires two TALE homeodomain transcription factors, OUROBOROS and SAMSARA. If either of the genes encoding these two proteins is dysfunctional, the alga develops as a gametophyte.

== Cultivation and Exploitation ==
A protocol has been established to culture Ectocarpus in the laboratory. Ectocarpus is able to grow in artificial seawater although the standard medium is Provasoli-enriched seawater (PES). Standard laboratory conditions are growth at 13 degrees Celsius under a 12h:12h light:dark cycle with irradiance at 20 μmol photons m^{−2} s^{−1}.

== Chemical Composition ==
Iodide originating from seawater can accumulate to high concentrations in several brown algae but high levels are not observed in Ectocarpus. Genes predicted to encode enzymes involved in iodine metabolism have been identified in Ectocarpus, including haloperoxidases, dehalogenases and haloalkane dehalogenases. These enzymes may be part of the defence mechanism of Ectocarpus against halogenated defenses of brown algal hosts when growing as an epiphyte.

== Utilization and Management ==
Ectocarpus is vulnerable to an array of pathogens and parasites and is also sensitive to abiotic stresses such as shifts in temperature, light and salinity. Major modifications to the Ectocarpus subulatus transcriptome have been observed following stress treatments.

== List of species ==
Some currently accepted species of Ectocarpus include:

- Ectocarpus acanthophorus Kützing
- Ectocarpus acutoramulis Noda
- Ectocarpus acutus Setchell & N.L.Gardner
- Ectocarpus adriaticus Ercegovic
- Ectocarpus affinis Setchell & N.L.Gardner
- Ectocarpus aleuticus Kützing
- Ectocarpus auratus Bory de Saint-Vincentex Kützing
- Ectocarpus balakrishnanii V.Krishnamurthy
- Ectocarpus barbadensis Kuckuck
- Ectocarpus berteroanus Montagne
- Ectocarpus bombycinus Kützing
- Ectocarpus borealis (Kjellman) Kjellman
- Ectocarpus bracchiolus Lindauer
- Ectocarpus brachiatus (Smith) S.F.Gray
- Ectocarpus brevicellularis Noda
- Ectocarpus caliacrae Celan
- Ectocarpus capensis Kützing
- Ectocarpus caspicus Henckel
- Ectocarpus chantransioides Setchell & N.L.Gardner
- Ectocarpus chapmanii Lindauer
- Ectocarpus chnoosporae Børgesen
- Ectocarpus cladosiphonae Noda
- Ectocarpus clavifer J.Agardh
- Ectocarpus commensalis Setchell & N.L.Gardner
- Ectocarpus commixtus Noda
- Ectocarpus confusiphyllus Noda
- Ectocarpus congregatus Zanardini
- Ectocarpus constanciae Hariot
- Ectocarpus corticulatus De A.Saunders
- Ectocarpus crouanii Thuret
- Ectocarpus crouaniorum Thuret
- Ectocarpus cryptophilus Børgesen
- Ectocarpus cymosus Zanardini
- Ectocarpus cystophylloides Noda
- Ectocarpus dellowianus Lindauer
- Ectocarpus denudatus P.L.Crouan & H.M.Crouan
- Ectocarpus dictyoptericola Noda
- Ectocarpus distortus Carmichael
- Ectocarpus divergens Kornmann
- Ectocarpus ensenadanus N.L.Gardner
- Ectocarpus erectus Kützing
- Ectocarpus exiguus Skottsberg
- Ectocarpus exilis Zanardini
- Ectocarpus falklandicus Skottsberg
- Ectocarpus fasciculatus Harvey (syn: Ectocarpus Landsburgii Harvey; named after the rev. David Landsborough)
- Ectocarpus fenestroides P. L. Crouan & H. M. Crouan
- Ectocarpus flagelliferus Setchell & N. L. Gardner
- Ectocarpus flagelliformis Kützing
- Ectocarpus fructuosus Setchell & N. L. Gardner
- Ectocarpus fulvescens Schousboe ex Thuret
- Ectocarpus fungiformis Oltmanns
- Ectocarpus fusiformis Nagai
- Ectocarpus giraudiae J. Agardh ex William M. Wilson
- Ectocarpus glaziovii Zeller
- Ectocarpus gonodioides Setchell & N. L. Gardner
- Ectocarpus hamulosus Harvey & J. W. Bailey
- Ectocarpus hancockii E. Y. Dawson
- Ectocarpus heterocarpus P. L. Crouan & H. M. Crouan
- Ectocarpus hornericola Noda
- Ectocarpus humilis Kützing
- Ectocarpus intermedius Kützing
- Ectocarpus isopodicola E. Y. Dawson
- Ectocarpus kellneri Meneghini
- Ectocarpus kjellmanioides Noda
- Ectocarpus laminariae Noda
- Ectocarpus laurenciae Yamada
- Ectocarpus lepasicola Noda
- Ectocarpus macrocarpus Harvey
- Ectocarpus macrocarpus P. L. Crouan & H. M. Crouan
- Ectocarpus minor Noda
- Ectocarpus minutissimus Skottsberg & Levring
- Ectocarpus minutulus Montagne
- Ectocarpus mitchellioides Noda
- Ectocarpus monzensis Noda & Konno
- Ectocarpus multifurcus Zanardini
- Ectocarpus myurus Zanardini
- Ectocarpus natans Zanardini
- Ectocarpus niigatensis Noda
- Ectocarpus nitens De Notaris
- Ectocarpus oblongatus Noda
- Ectocarpus obovatus Foslie
- Ectocarpus obtusocarpus P. L. Crouan & H. M. Crouan
- Ectocarpus obtusus Noda
- Ectocarpus parvulus Kützing
- Ectocarpus pectenis Ercegović
- Ectocarpus penicillatus (C. Agardh) Kjellman
- Ectocarpus plasticola Noda
- Ectocarpus plumosus Noda
- Ectocarpus polysiphoniae Noda
- Ectocarpus pumilus Zanardini
- Ectocarpus radicans Zanardini
- Ectocarpus rallsiae Vickers
- Ectocarpus ramentaceus Zanardini
- Ectocarpus rotundatoapicalis Noda & Honda
- Ectocarpus rudis Zanardini
- Ectocarpus rufulus Kützing
- Ectocarpus rufus (Roth) C. Agardh
- Ectocarpus sadoensis Noda
- Ectocarpus sargassicaulinus Noda
- Ectocarpus sargassiphyllus Noda
- Ectocarpus saxatilis Zanardini
- Ectocarpus scytosiphonae Noda
- Ectocarpus shiiyaensis Noda
- Ectocarpus shimokitaensis Ohta
- Ectocarpus siliculosus (Dillwyn) Lyngbye
- Ectocarpus simpliciusculus C. Agardh
- Ectocarpus simulans Setchell & N. L. Gardner
- Ectocarpus sonorensis E. Y. Dawson
- Ectocarpus sphaericus Ohta
- Ectocarpus strigosus Zanardini
- Ectocarpus tamarinii Børgesen
- Ectocarpus taoniae Setchell & N. L. Gardner
- Ectocarpus tappiensis Ohta
- Ectocarpus tasshaensis Noda
- Ectocarpus trichophorus H. Gran
- Ectocarpus tsugaruensis Ohta
- Ectocarpus variabilis Vickers
- Ectocarpus venetus Kützing
- Ectocarpus vungtauensis P. H. Hô
- Ectocarpus yezoensis Yamada & Tanaka
- Ectocarpus zonariae W. R. Taylor
- Ectocarpus zosterae Noda & Ohta
