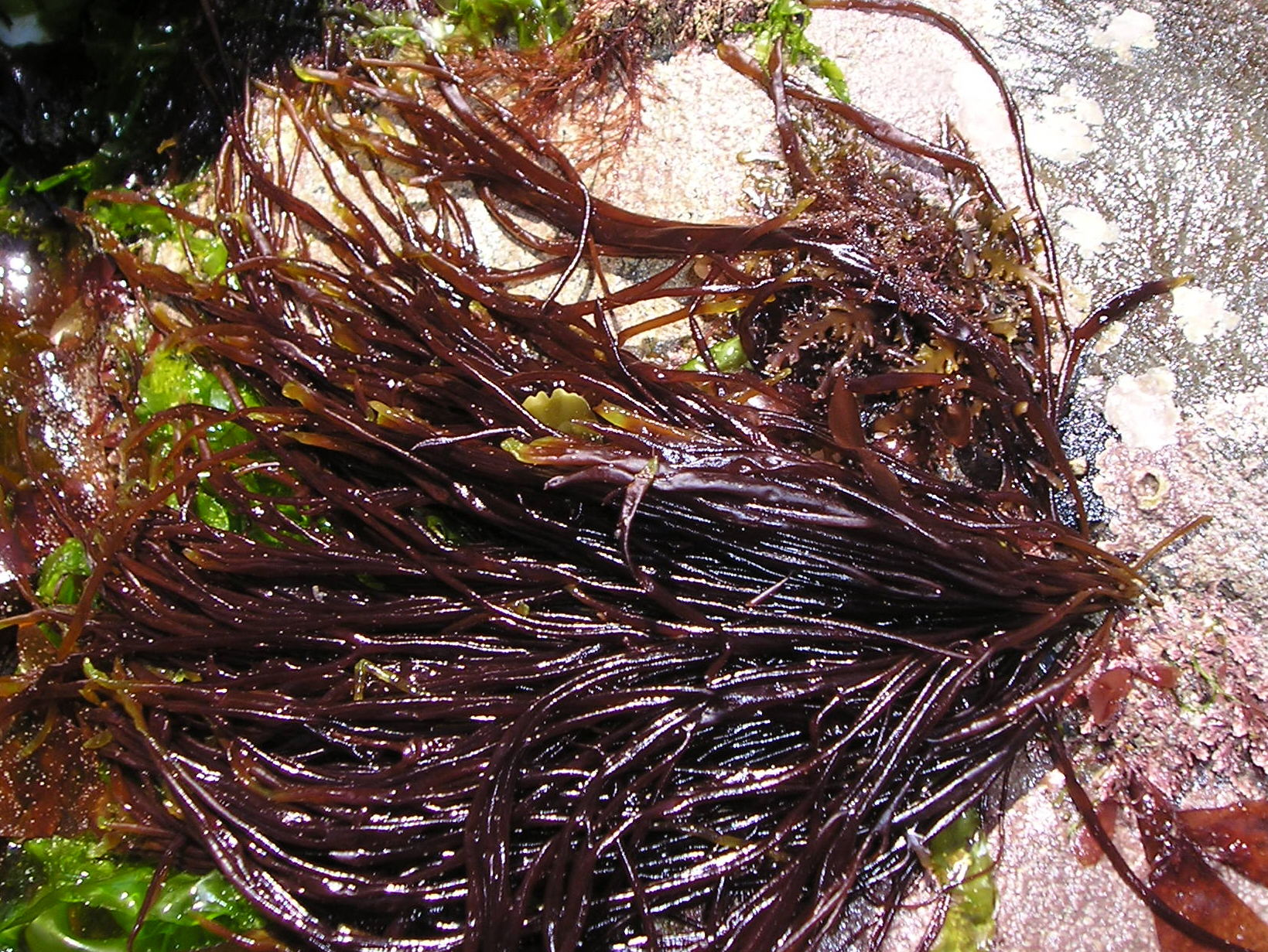

Scientific classification
- Domain: Eukaryota
- Clade: Sar
- Clade: Stramenopiles
- Division: Ochrophyta
- Class: Phaeophyceae
- Order: Ectocarpales
- Family: Scytosiphonaceae
- Genus: Scytosiphon
- Species: S. lomentaria

Binomial name
- Scytosiphon lomentaria (Lyngbye) J. Agardh

= Scytosiphon lomentaria =

Genus of seaweeds

Scytosiphon lomentaria is a littoral brown seaweed with an irregularly lobed many filamentous form. It is a member of the Phaeophyceae in the order Ectocarpales and grows attached to shells and stones in rock-pools and in near-shore waters. The attachment to the substrate is by a small disc shaped holdfast.

== Description ==
Scytosiphon lomentaria has cylindrical, shiny, olive brown, unbranched fronds up to 400 mm long. They have short stalks and a large number may arise from a single holdfast. They widen to 3-10mm and narrow again near the tip. They are hollow and often have irregular constrictions.

== Distribution and habitat ==
This species is cosmopolitan in distribution being found in temperate waters around the world. The type location is Denmark. It occurs in the littoral zone and favours wave-exposed shores and rock pools. Small plants are often found growing on limpets and pebbles.
