= Oyster thief =

Oyster thief is a common name for two unrelated species of seaweed:

- Codium fragile, a green algae in the family Codiaceae
- Colpomenia sinuosa, a brown algae in the family Scytosiphonaceae
