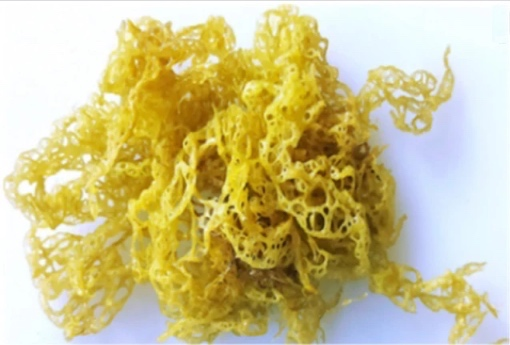
- Hydroclathrus sp

Scientific classification
- Domain: Eukaryota
- Clade: Sar
- Clade: Stramenopiles
- Division: Ochrophyta
- Class: Phaeophyceae
- Order: Ectocarpales
- Family: Scytosiphonaceae
- Genus: Hydroclathrus; Bory de Saint-Vincent, 1825

= Hydroclathrus =

Genus of seaweeds

Hydroclathrus is a genus of perforate (pierced with holes) brown alga, of the phylum Ochrophyta and the class Phaeophyceae.

== Taxonomy ==
The genus Hydroclathrus belongs to the order Ectocarpales, and the family Scytosiphonaceae. This genus currently has six taxonomically accepted species:

- Hydroclathrus clathratus (C.Agardh) M.Howe
- Hydroclathrus minutus Santiañez & Kogame
- Hydroclathrus rapanuii Santiañez, Macaya & Kogame
- Hydroclathrus tenuis C.K.Tseng & Lu Baroen
- Hydroclathrus tilesii (Endlicher) Santiañez & M.J.Wynne
- Hydroclathrus tumulis Kraft & Abbott

== Morphology ==
=== Thalli ===
The thalli of Hydroclathrus are vesicular or irregular ovate that later becomes hollow with many pores, giving them a net-like appearance (clathrate). Young thalli are attached first to the substrate by rhizoid, but when mature, they detached from the substrate and developed into a complex network with rounded holes (0.5–2 cm in diameter) with involute margins. Thalli exhibits yellow-brown coloration.

=== Internal morphology ===
The cross-section of the thalli comprises a network of about 600-900 micros thick. Like other seaweeds, it is composed of a cortex and medulla; small, cuboidal cortical cells about 5-9 microns with chromatophores, while the larger medullary cells (100-130 microns) are colorless.

=== Reproductive structure ===
The plurangia of Lobophora is biseriate and scattered throughout the surface of the thalli.

== Life history ==
Research determined that Hydroclathrus clathratus, together with another seaweed, Colpomenia sinuosa, displays a heteromorphic reproductive cycle. There is an alternation between erect thalli with plurilocular zoidangia and prostrate thalli having both ectocarpoid plurilocular and unilocular zoidangia. Plurizoids produced by both erect and prostrate thalli become prostrate thalli. On the other hand, unizoids develops into erect thalli. At long day conditions, rostrate thalli produced plurilocular zoidangia, while at short day conditions, unilocular zoidangia are produced between 10–20 °C (50–68 °F).

== Distribution ==
The genus Hydroclathrus is found throughout the tropical and warm temperate regions of the Pacific, Indian, and Atlantic oceans. They inhabit shallow intertidal waters, and during the peak season, they grow in high density at various ecosystems such as, seagrass beds and coral reefs.

== Ecology and impacts ==
Hydroclathrus clathratus is among the macro-benthic seaweeds that release essential organic nutrients (dissolved organic carbon (DOC), particulate organic carbon (POC), and nitrogen) to the coral reefs. In a study, the seaweeds exuded DOC and POC in amounts of 12.2 ± 2.1 and 4.2 ± 0.3 mg organic C m−² algae surface area h− 1, respectively. Moreover, release of organic matter is greatly influence by functional properties, e.g. algal growth or life strategy. It is highly correlated with seasonal and depth mediated variations such as temperature and light availability. This further validates the role of seaweeds in marine biogeochemical cycles, and the release of organic nutrients to coral reef systems.

== Human use ==
Hydroclathrus is commonly used for human consumption in the form of salads, and agriculture applications such as animal feeds and fertilizer

A variety of natural products are found in the genus Hydroclathrus similar with other brown seaweeds. These are: fatty acids; minerals: cadmium, copper, mercury, Iodine, nitrogen, nickel, lead, and zinc; phytohormones: auxin, cytokinin, and gibberellin; pigments: carotene, chlorophyll a, chlorophyll c, fucoxanthin; polysaccharides/simple sugars: alginic acid, fucoidan, and laminarin; protein; sugar alcohol: mannitol; and vitamins: folic and folinic acid.

For medicinal application, antiviral polysaccharides were extracted from Hydroclathrus clathratus. These are H3-a1 and H3-b1. In addition, the extracts' derivatives were observed to have anticoagulant properties. Furthermore, Hydroclathrus polysaccharide, H3-a1, was observed to have antitumor potential. It suppresses sciatic Sarcoma 180 tumor growth and prolonged the life span of mice in laboratory experiments by inducing increased tumor necrosis factor-alpha level in mouse serum. However, further studies are needed to determine its effectiveness for as a medicinal product. Other potential medicinal use for Hydroclathrus, is its antimicrobial property observed in-vitro settings.

Potential for application for environment utilization, particularly for solid waste management for wastewater treatment, were also explored. The residue powder of Hydroclathrus clathratus after being extracted most of its active components in methanol were used as absorbent material for wastewater treatment from excess heavy metals such as cadmium and copper. This provided new insights on the potentiality of use of seaweed as a treatment tool for wastewater and develop efforts in resource management.
