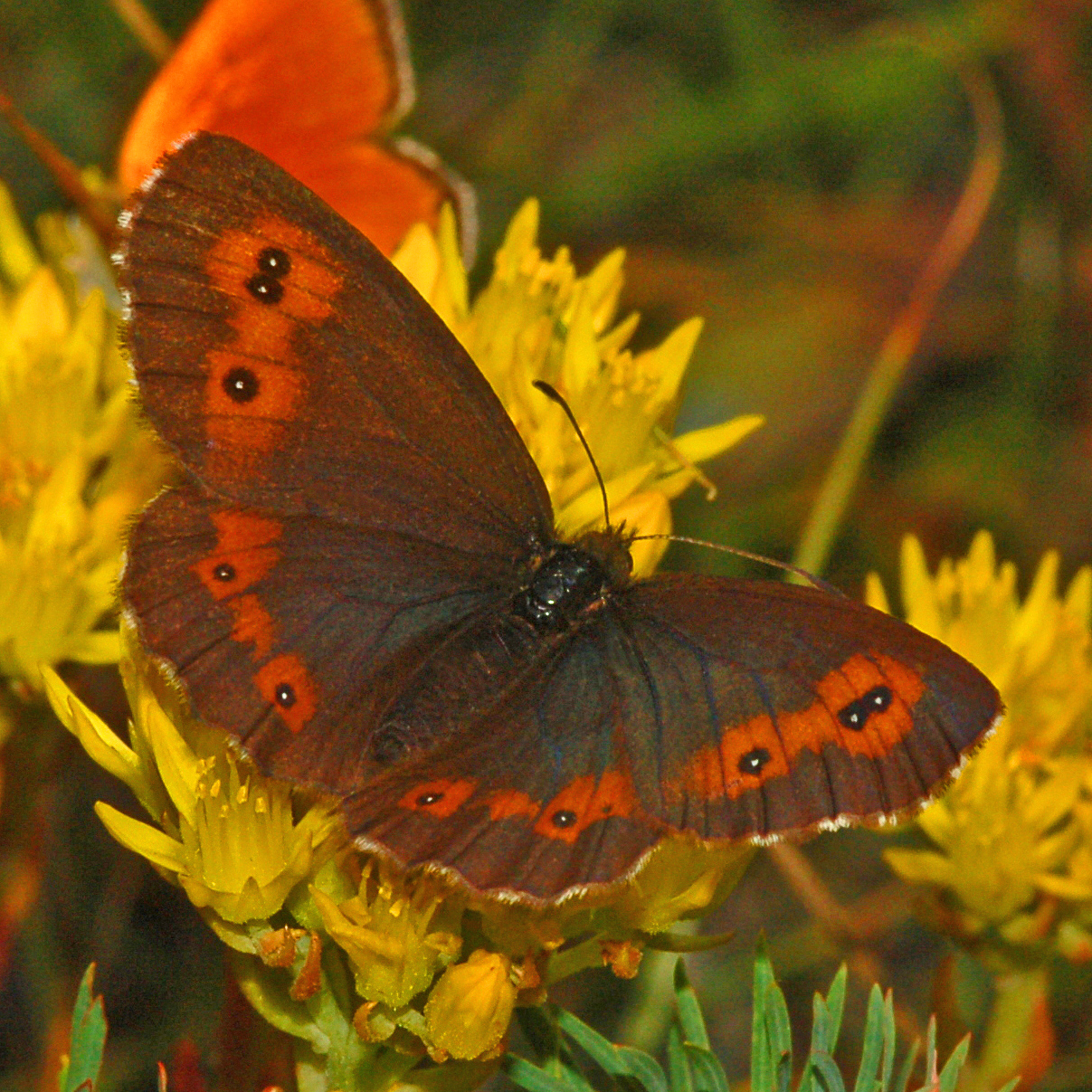
- Upperside
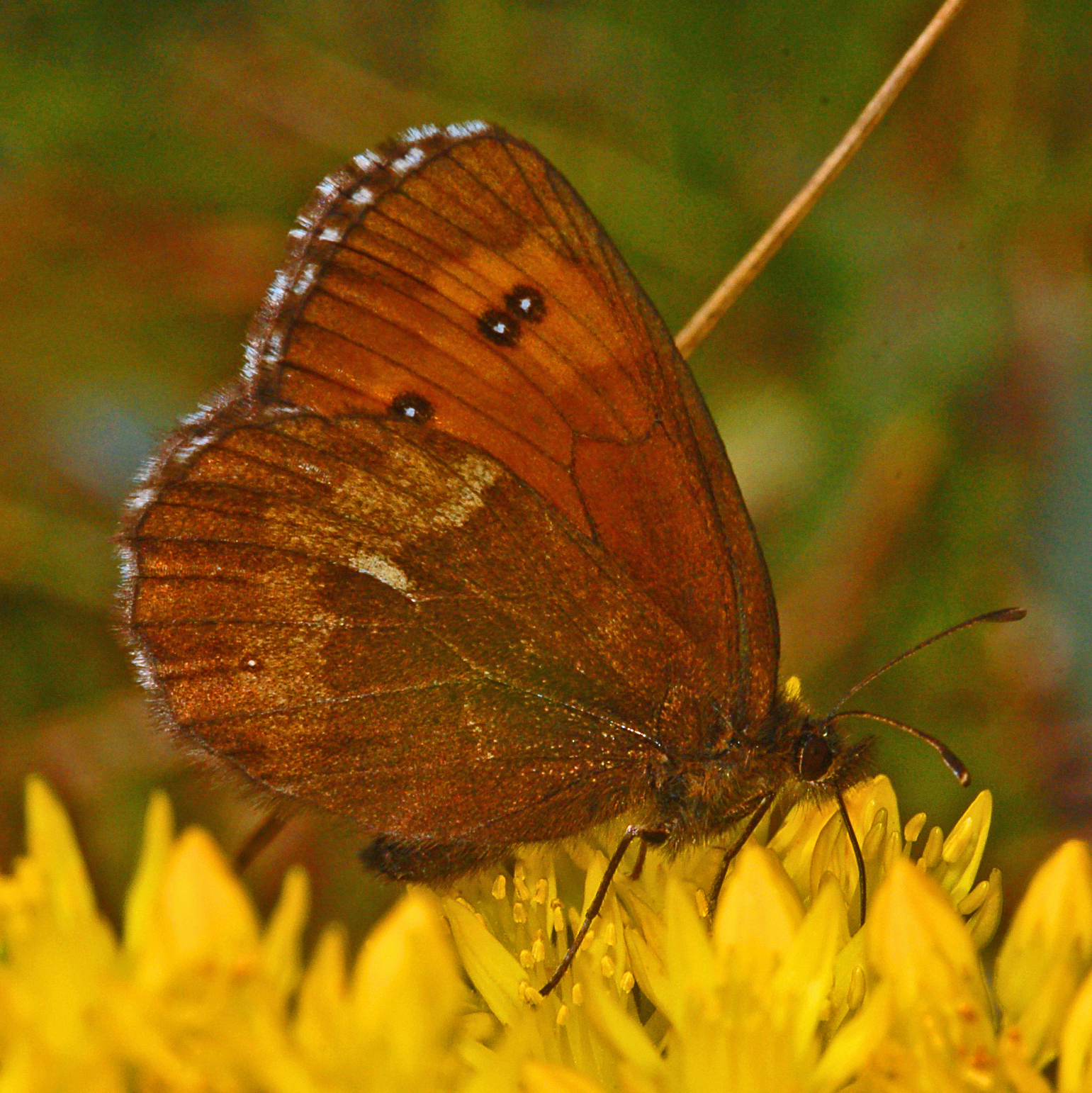
- Underside, female

Scientific classification
- Kingdom: Animalia
- Phylum: Arthropoda
- Class: Insecta
- Order: Lepidoptera
- Family: Nymphalidae
- Genus: Erebia
- Species: E. euryale

Binomial name
- Erebia euryale (Esper, 1805)

Synonyms
- List: Papilio philomela Esper, [1804]; Erebia segregata Reverdin, 1918; Erebia apicalis Reverdin, 1918; Erebia tramelana Reverdin, 1918; Erebia addenda Reverdin, 1918; Erebia bipunctata Hartig, 1924; Erebia defessa Hartig, 1924; Erebia latifasciata Hartig, 1924; Erebia pleniocellata Hartig, 1924; Erebia reducta Osthelder, 1925; Erebia antevortes Verity, 1925; Erebia nana Diószeghy, 1930; Erebia pyraenaeicola Holtz, 1930; Erebia minima Holtz, 1930; Erebia uralensi s Holtz, 1930; Erebia transsylvanica Warren, 1931; Erebia jungens Holtz, 1932; Erebia sexpunctata Diószeghy, 1935; Erebia splendens Warren, 1936; Erebia punctifera Kolar, 1938; Erebia grandiuscula Riel, 1944; Erebia bedei Loritz, 1951; Erebia parviuscula Loritz, 1952; Erebia fenestrata Loritz, 1952; Erebia nigrosubmersa Loritz, 1952; Erebia totenigra Verity, 1953; Erebia iremelica Korshunov, 1995

= Erebia euryale =

Large ringlet

Species of butterfly

Erebia euryale, the large ringlet, is a species of butterfly belonging to the family Nymphalidae.

== Subspecies ==
Subspecies include:

- Erebia euryale adyte Hübner, 1822 (central and southern Alps, Swiss Jura and parts of Abruzzo)
- Erebia euryale etobyma Fruhstorfer, 1910
- Erebia euryale euryale (Esper, 1805) (northern Alps)
- Erebia euryale huebneri Oberthür, 1912
- Erebia euryale isarica Heyne, 1895 (northern Alps, Switzerland, France)
- Erebia euryale ocellaris Staudinger, 1861 (eastern and southern Alps)
- Erebia euryale syrmia Fruhstorfer, 1909 (Balkan Peninsula, Bulgaria, Romania)
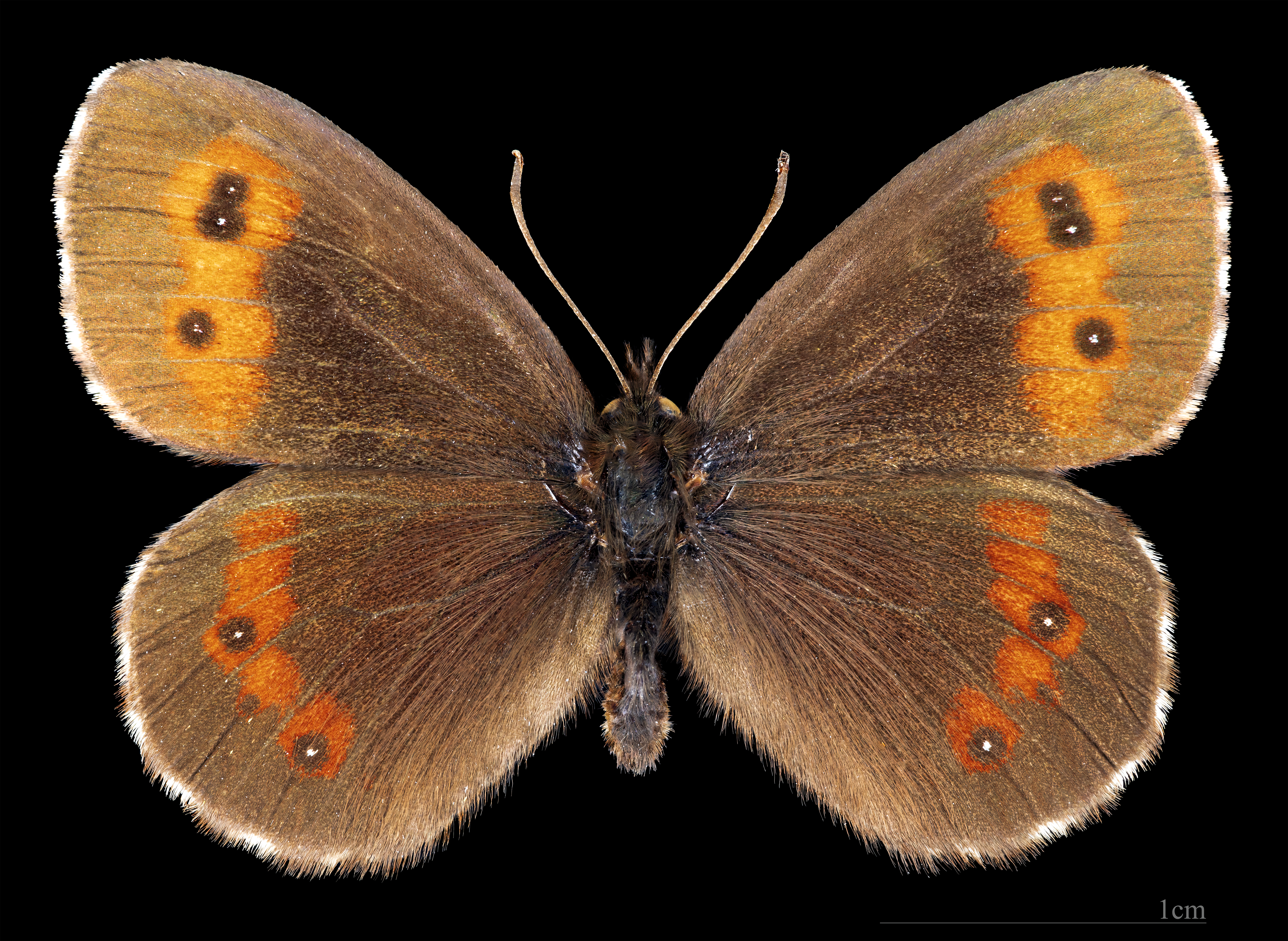
Erebia euryale adyte ♂

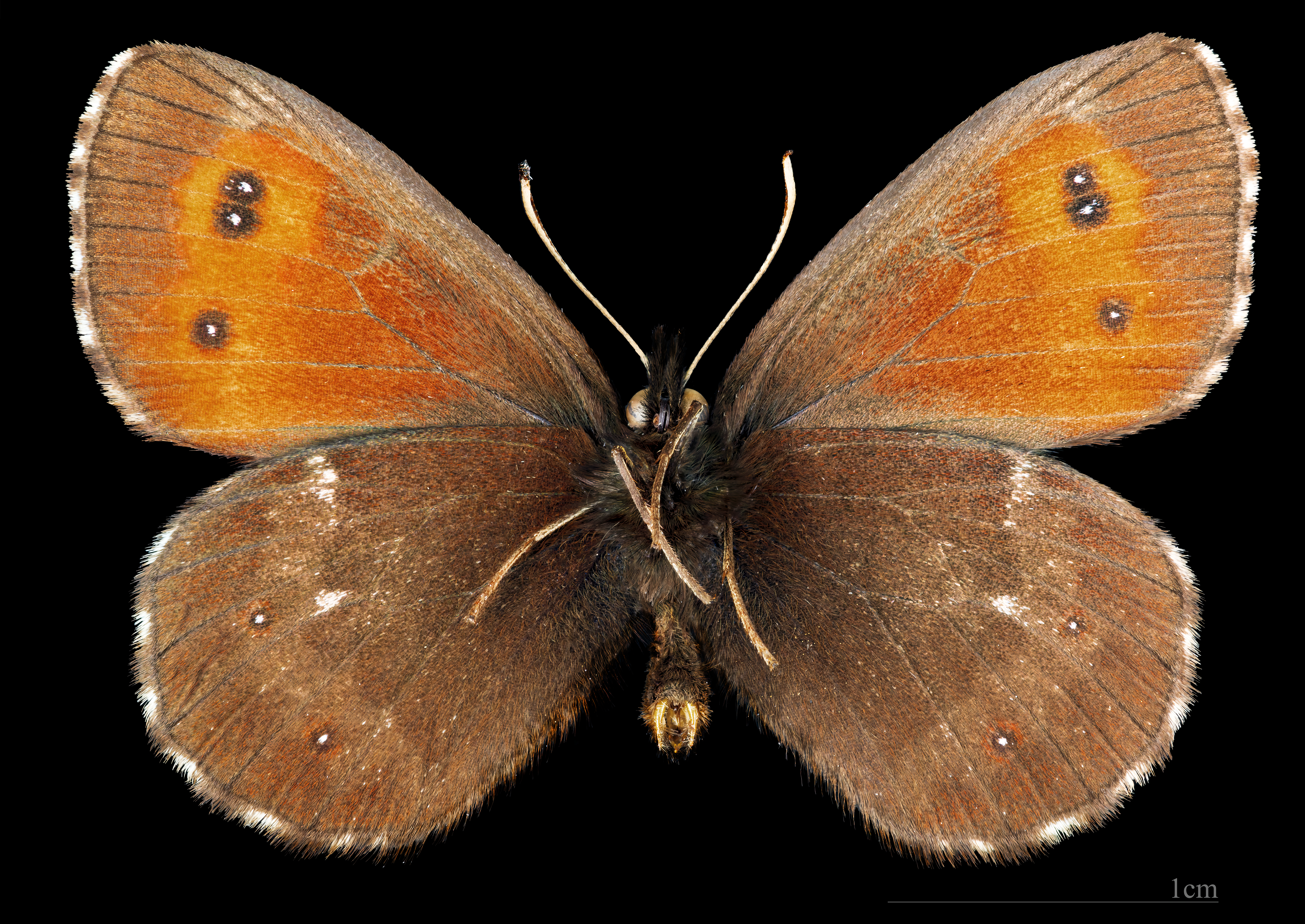
Erebia euryale adyte ♂ △

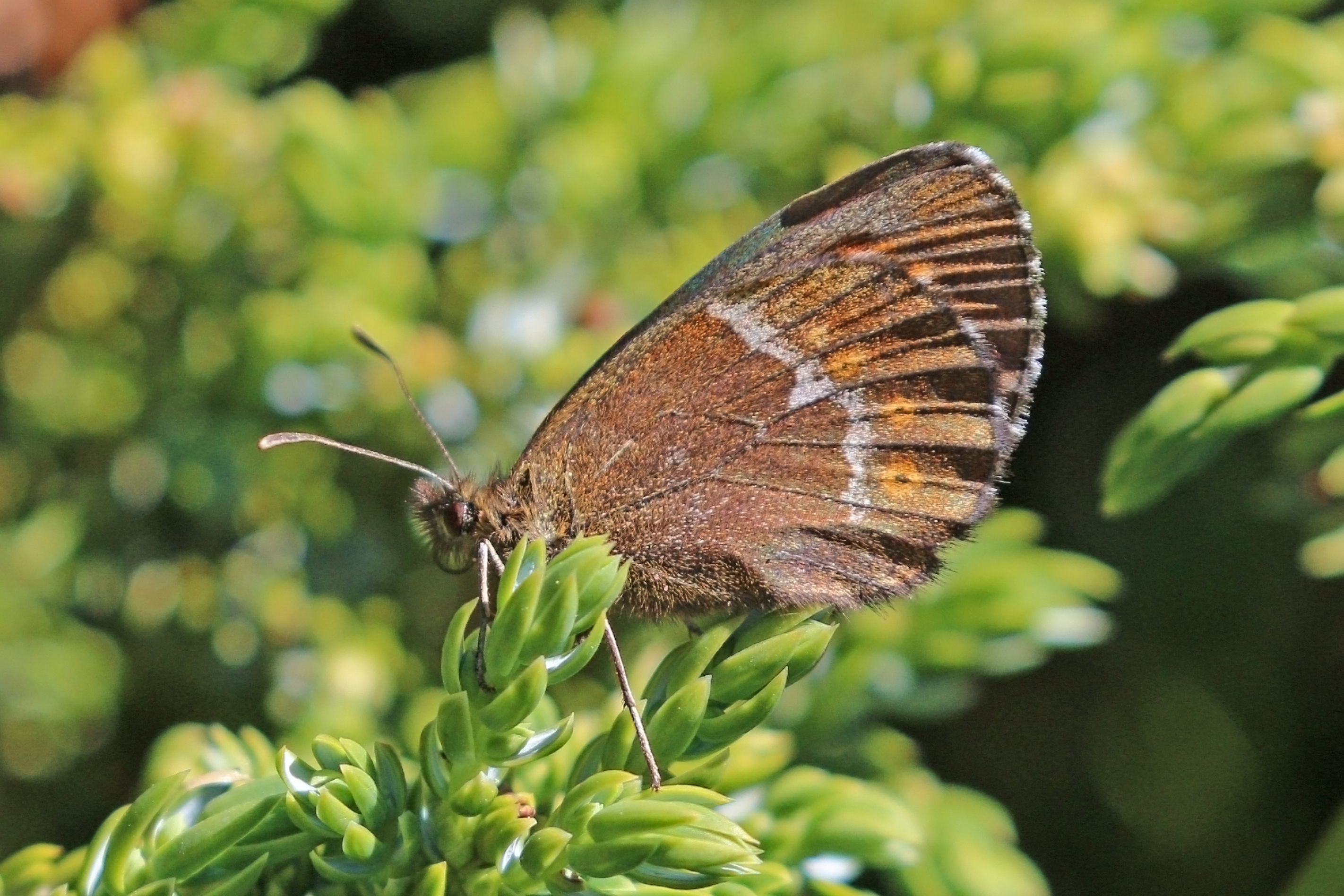
Female, Bulgaria

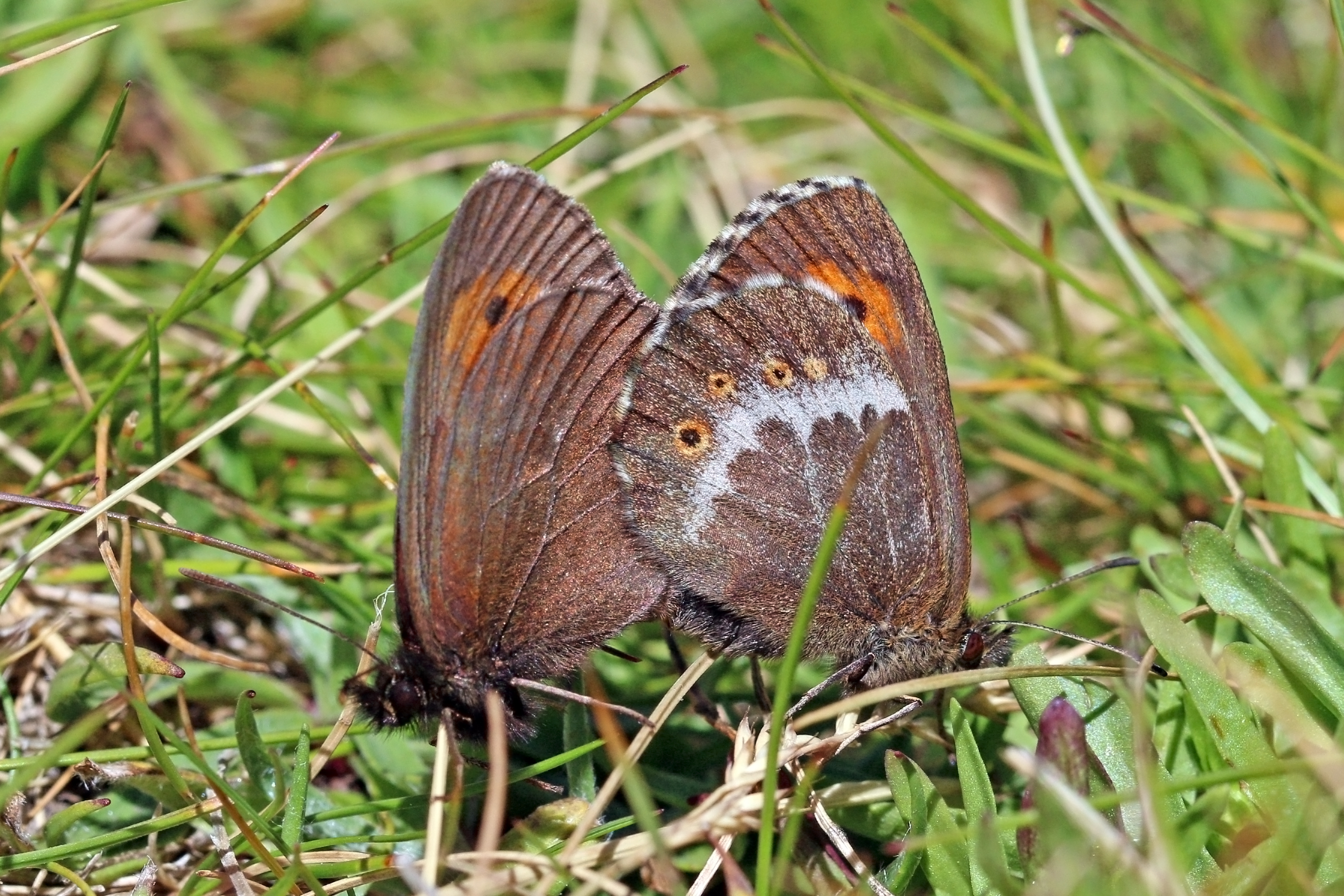
Mating, Bulgaria

== Distribution and habitat ==
This species is endemic to Europe. It can be found in southern Europe, in the Alps, Cantabrian, Pyrenees, Carpathians, Balkans, in northern Europe from Finland to the Urals and in Altai. Erebia euryale is an alpine species. It lives in spruce forest clearings, glades, slopes, subalpine meadows and damp meadows at an elevation of 500–2,600 metres (1,600–8,500 ft) above sea level.

== Description ==
Erebia euryale has a wingspan of 20–23 mm. These butterflies have a considerable geographic variation. Usually the upperside of the forewings is dark brown with a reddish-orange postmedian band marked with three or four oval ocelli, with white pupils in the females, often blind or reduced to small dots in the males. All wings show chequered fringes. The forewings of the males do not show androconial area. The upperside of each hindwing usually has three eyespots surrounded by orange. The underside hindwings of the females shows a diffuse clear or whitish band, strongly dentate. The caterpillar and the chrysalis are pinkish brown. This species is rather similar to Erebia ligea.

== Biology ==
This species is univoltine. It overwinters a first year as an egg, a second year as a caterpillar. The eggs, pearly grey, hatch in the spring. Adults fly from June to September. They feed at mountain flowers, specially at yellow daisies. Caterpillars feed on various grasses (Anthoxanthum odoratum, Brachypodium sylvaticum, Deschampsia cespitosa, Festuca ovina, Festuca rubra, Festuca alpina, Poa nemoralis, Carex flacca, Digitaria, Milium, Carex and Sesleria species).

== Bibliography ==
- A. G. Tatarinov and M. M. Dolgin: To the Knowledge of the Intraspecific Variation of the Satyrid Erebia euryale Esp. (Lepidoptera, Satyridae) in Northeastern European Russia.
- Bolotov I.N. 2012. The Fauna and Ecology of Butterflies (Lepidoptera, Rhopalocera) of the Kanin Peninsula and Kolguev Island. - Entomological Review 92(3): 296–304.
- Guide des papillons d'Europe et d'Afrique du Nord de Tom Tolman, Richard Lewington, éditions Delachaux et Niestlé, 1998 - (ISBN 2603011146)
- M.Chinery & P.Leraut Photoguide des papillons d'Europe Delachaux et Niestlé (ISBN 2-603-01114-6)
- Thomas Schmitt & Karola Haubrich: The genetic structure of the mountain forest butterfly Erebia euryale unravels the late Pleistocene and postglacial history of the mountain coniferous forest biome in Europe. Molecular Ecology, 17: 2194–2207, 2008 doi:10.1111/j.1365-294X.2007.03687.x
