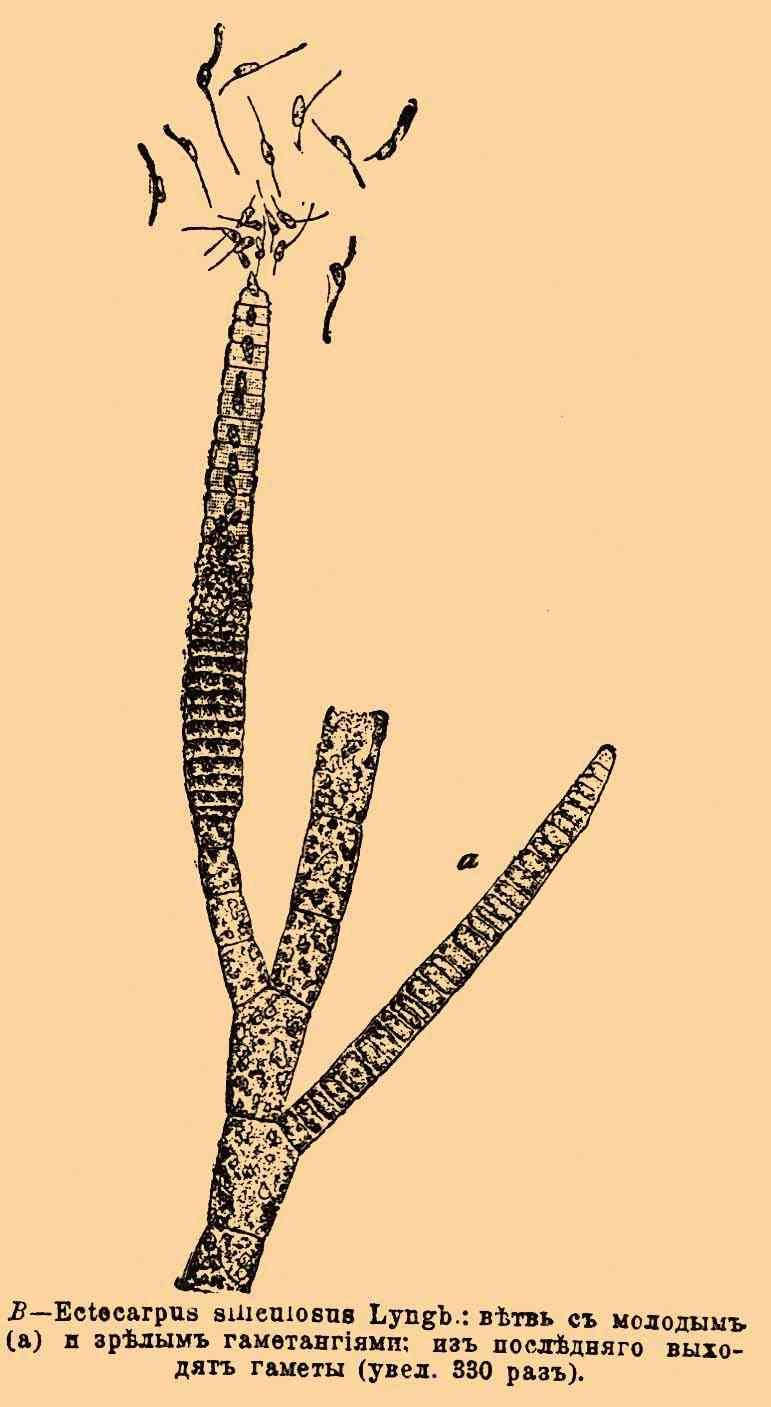
- E. siliculosus, from the Brockhaus and Efron Encyclopedic Dictionary (1890-1907)

Scientific classification
- Domain: Eukaryota
- Clade: Diaphoretickes
- Clade: Sar
- Clade: Stramenopiles
- Phylum: Gyrista
- Subphylum: Ochrophytina
- Class: Phaeophyceae
- Order: Ectocarpales
- Family: Ectocarpaceae
- Genus: Ectocarpus
- Species: E. siliculosus

Binomial name
- Ectocarpus siliculosus (Dillwyn) Lyngbye, 1819

= Ectocarpus siliculosus =

Species of brown alga

Ectocarpus siliculosus is a filamentous brown alga. Its genome was the first brown macroalgal genome to be sequenced, with the expectation that E. siliculosus will serve as a genetic and genomic model for brown macroalgae.

Scientific classification
Clade:	SAR
Phylum:	Ochrophyta
Class:	Phaeophyceae
Order:	Ectocarpales
Family:	Ectocarpaceae
Genus:	Ectocarpus
Species:	E. siliculosus
Binomial name
Ectocarpus siliculosus (Dillwyn) Lyngbye 1819

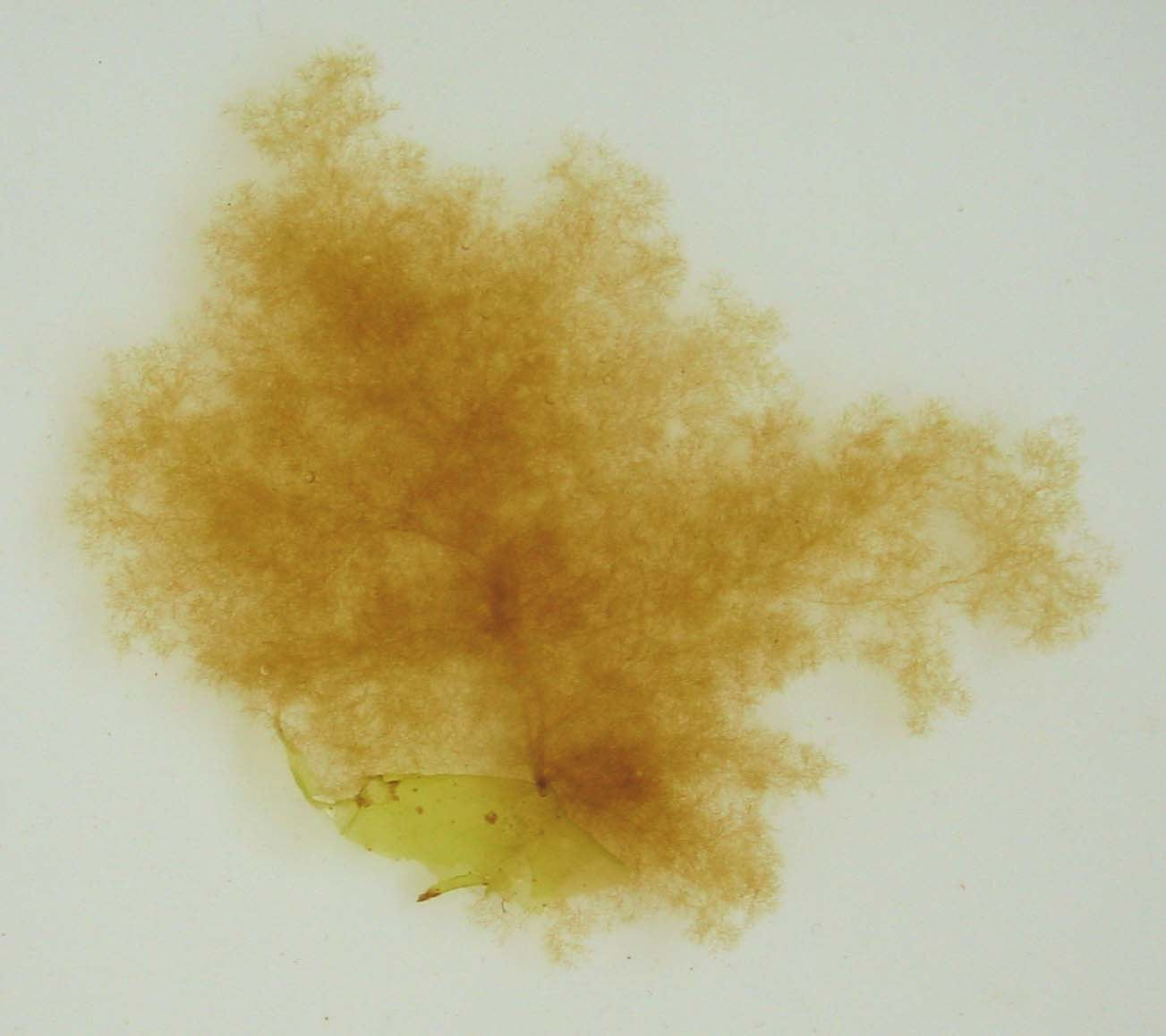
A close up image of E. siliculosus that shows its many filaments

== Ecology ==
The brown algae are members of the stramenopiles (along with organisms such as diatoms and oomycetes). The stramenopiles diverged from other major eukaryotic groups such as the opisthokonts (animals and fungi) and the archaeplastida (which includes land plants) over a billion years ago. The brown algae are also important because they are one of only a small number of eukaryotic groups that have evolved complex multicellularity.

The alga is unbranched and filamentous; it forms soft beards on larger plants or other firm substrata and grows up to 2 feet long. Its thallus is filamentous, initially organized as a main primary filament composed of elongated cells and round cells, from which branches differentiate. E. siliculosus is a tufted plant, often only one to a few cm tall, but in exceptional cases up to 20 cm. It has axes that are freely branched, and the main axis is not distinguishable. Filaments on E. siliculosus can grow up to 30μm in diameter, tapering toward the apices and sometimes forming terminal pseudo hairs.

== Reproduction ==
E. siliculosus reproduction and growth involves two different patterns of early development, which begin with either a symmetric or an asymmetric division of the initial cell. Symmetric division leads to the development of a prostrate, basal structure before the erect thallus is formed. Asymmetric division leads to the immediate development of an erect thallus without the formation of a prostrate, basal structure (immediate differentiation). E. siliculosus alternates between two generational life cycles that differ in either being sporophytes ( produce few laterals and develop from a branched prostrate base) or gametophytes ( richly branched and devoid of a prostrate base). E. siliculosus gametophytes have an asymmetric initial cell division and immediate differentiation of an erect thallus. The alternation of the two different generations in E. siliculosus therefore alternates between symmetric and asymmetric cell divisions as well.

E. siliculosus develops uniseriate filaments. It has a sporophyte body which is made up of the prostrate body and the upright body. The prostrate body is in turn composed of crawling filaments ( crawling filaments are made of Elongated (E) cells and Round (R) cells) which is a filament with E cells on the edges and R cells in the center. Then, there is a period of secondary growth in which axes develop in the center of the primary filament and on the R cells. The upright filaments will grow from the prostrate body and differentiate into sporangia.

== E. siliculosus in Research ==
Brown algae have many unique characteristics in terms of their metabolism and cell biology. Ergo, brown algae and in particular, E. siliculosus, are often used for explorative research. Its genome was the first brown macroalgal genome to be sequenced, with the expectation that E. siliculosus will serve as a genetic and genomic model for brown macroalgae. In 2004, many laboratories, including the Station Biologique in Roscoff and Genoscope, began to sequence the genome of E. siliculosus.

Ectocarpus has been used by researchers to study the evolution of complex multicellularity in brown algae. With the study of Ectocarpus came the discovery of multiple genetic and genomic resources that apply to all species of brown algae. Before, the lack of both the proper tools to study genome data and genome data itself halted the progress of understanding brown algal developmental processes at the molecular level. However, due to Ectocarpus being less complex, it is easier to study.

== Iron Storage and Bonding ==
E. siliculosus is able to accumulate high concentrations of iodide from seawater. The carbon storage system of brown algae is unusual, involving the accumulation of reserves of mannitol and the β-1,3-glucan laminarin rather than α-1,4-glucans such as starch or glycogen. The mannitol pathway was probably most likely a speciation event in the brown algal lineage via a horizontal transfer event from actinobacteria, along with another key metabolic pathway in brown algae, alginate biosynthesis.

This species of Ectocarpus has been shown to bind iron on its cells with non-specificity. This iron ion shell allows the algae to store and have a constant source of iron regardless of the conditions of the surrounding environment. This adaptation is important because this method of iron uptake is similar to that of terrestrial organisms and differs from the methods typically used in the marine environment such as siderophores.

== Sexual Characteristics ==
Ectocarpus is a species known for its evolution of sex-based gene expression. It has also been found to have a low level of phenotypic sexual dimorphism. Having a low level of sexual dimorphism means that two sexes of a species do not have different characteristics. This has been backed up by the findings that Ectocarpus has female genes that evolve as rapidly as their male genes. This is also backed up by the findings that the consistency in the patterns that scientists found with its sexual systems relating to UV haploid systems.
