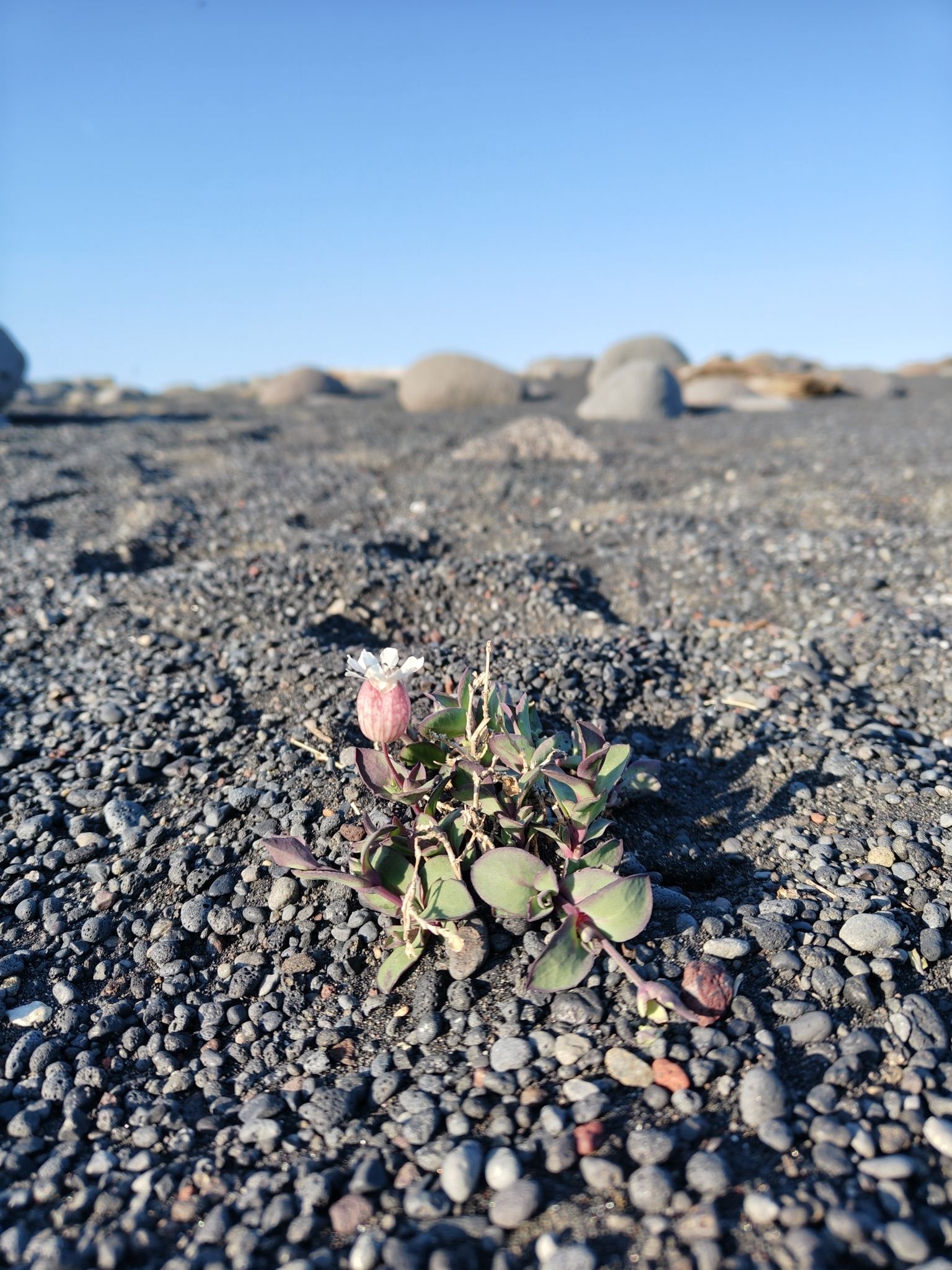
- Sea campion on the north coast of Iceland

Scientific classification
- Kingdom: Plantae
- Clade: Tracheophytes
- Clade: Angiosperms
- Clade: Eudicots
- Order: Caryophyllales
- Family: Caryophyllaceae
- Genus: Silene
- Species: S. uniflora

Binomial name
- Silene uniflora Roth

Subspecies
- S. u. subsp. petraea; S. u. subsp. thorei; S. u. subsp. uniflora

Synonyms
- Behenantha uniflora; Oberna uniflora; Silene inflata var. uniflora; Wahlbergella uniflora

= Silene uniflora =

Plant species in the carnation family

Silene uniflora is a species of flowering plant in the carnation family known by the common name sea campion.

== Description ==
Silene uniflora is a perennial plant that forms a mat with stems growing outwards to between 10 and 40 cm. A plant will grow a large main root that can be a thick storage root like that of a carrot or turnip. The stems can grow along the ground or grow upwards towards their ends.

The leaves are hairless and glaucous, grey-green due to a covering of natural waxes. They have a fleshy texture and a variety of shapes including lanceolate, oblanceolate, elliptic or spatulate. The flowers white with five deeply notched petals, the five sepals fused and inflated to form a bladder. Each flower has three pistils and three stamens that are almost enclosed by the flower.

It is similar in appearance to the bladder campion (Silene vulgaris) but with flowers generally solitary.

== Taxonomy ==
In 1762 Carl Linnaeus named Silene amoena, a species that does not have the same description as Silene uniflora, but is regarded as a synonym of Silene uniflora subsp. uniflora. The scientific description and naming of the species as a whole was by Albrecht Wilhelm Roth in 1794. It is classified in the genus Silene which is in the family Caryophyllaceae.

=== Subspecies ===
The sea campion has three subspecies listed as accepted by Plants of the World Online (POWO):

- S. uniflora subsp. petraea (C. Hartm.) Jonsell & H. C. Prent.
  Endemic to Sweden
- S. uniflora subsp. thorei (Dufour) Jalas
  Native to Southwest France (extinct in Spain)
- S. uniflora subsp. uniflora
  Atlantic Europe, the Azores, Madeira

However, other sources such as the World Flora Online (WFO) and World Plants (WP) list additional subspecies as accepted.

- Silene uniflora subsp. cratericola (Franco) Franco (WP)
- Silene uniflora subsp. glareosa (Jord.) Chater & S.M.Walters (WFO)
- Silene uniflora subsp. prostrata (Gaudin) Chater & S.M.Walters (WFO)

There are 54 synonyms of sea campion or one of its three subspecies.

Table of Synonyms
Name	Year	Rank	Synonym of:	Notes
Behen alpinus (Lam.) Guşul.	1953	species	subsp. uniflora	= het.
Behen maritimus (With.) Link	1829	species	subsp. uniflora	= het.
Behen uniflorus Link	1829	species	subsp. uniflora	= het.
Behenantha uniflora (Roth) Ikonn.	1975	species	S. uniflora	≡ hom.
Cucubalus alpinus Lam.	1786	species	subsp. uniflora	= het.
Cucubalus behen var. maritimus (With.) Wahlenb.	1812	variety	subsp. uniflora	= het.
Cucubalus fabarius Thore	1803	species	subsp. thorei	= het., nom. illeg.
Cucubalus littoralis Pers.	1805	species	subsp. uniflora	= het.
Cucubalus maritimus (With.) Lam.	1786	species	subsp. uniflora	= het.
Oberna alpina (Lam.) Ikonn.	1976	species	subsp. uniflora	= het.
Oberna behen subsp. maritima (With.) Soják	1984	subspecies	subsp. uniflora	= het.
Oberna behen subsp. thorei (Dufour) Soják	1984	subspecies	subsp. thorei	≡ hom.
Oberna thorei (Dufour) Holub	1977	species	subsp. thorei	≡ hom.
Oberna uniflora (Roth) Ikonn.	1976	species	S. uniflora	≡ hom.
Oberna uniflora subsp. islandica (Á.Löve & D.Löve) Holub	1977	subspecies	subsp. uniflora	= het.
Silene alpina (Lam.) E.Thomas ex Gren. & Godr.	1847	species	subsp. uniflora	= het., nom. illeg.
Silene amoena L.	1762	species	subsp. uniflora	= het., nom. illeg.
Silene bastardii Boreau ex J.Lloyd	1878	species	subsp. uniflora	= het.
Silene crassifolia Thore	1810	species	subsp. thorei	≡ hom., nom. illeg.
Silene cucubalus proles maritima (With.) Rouy & Foucaud	1896	proles	subsp. uniflora	= het., nom. illeg.
Silene cucubalus subsp. alpina (Lam.) Dostál	1948	subspecies	subsp. uniflora	= het., nom. illeg.
Silene cucubalus subsp. thorei (Dufour) Rouy & Foucaud	1896	subspecies	subsp. thorei	≡ hom.
Silene cucubalus var. bastardii (Boreau ex J.Lloyd) Rouy	1883	variety	subsp. uniflora	= het.
Silene cucubalus var. petraea (Fr.) Rouy & Foucaud	1896	variety	subsp. uniflora	= het.
Silene cucubalus var. tenella Rouy & Foucaud	1896	variety	subsp. thorei	= het.
Silene inflata subsp. alpina (Lam.) Killias	1887	subspecies	subsp. uniflora	= het., nom. illeg.
Silene inflata subsp. maritima (With.) Bonnier & Layens	1894	subspecies	subsp. uniflora	= het., nom. illeg.
Silene inflata subsp. thorei (Dufour) Bonnier & Layens	1894	subspecies	subsp. thorei	≡ hom.
Silene inflata var. maritima (With.) Hartm.	1820	variety	subsp. uniflora	= het.
Silene inflata var. petraea Fr.	1842	variety	subsp. uniflora	= het.
Silene inflata var. uniflora (Roth) Lej. & Courtois	1831	variety	S. uniflora	≡ hom.
Silene maritima (With.) Sm.	1800	species	subsp. uniflora	= het.
Silene maritima subsp. alpina (Lam.) Nyman	1878	subspecies	subsp. uniflora	= het.
Silene maritima subsp. islandica Á.Löve & D.Löve	1956	subspecies	subsp. uniflora	= het.
Silene maritima var. nigrescens Merino	1905	variety	subsp. uniflora	= het.
Silene maritima var. petraea C.Hartm.	1879	variety	subsp. petraea	≡ hom.
Silene maritima var. stenophylla Merino	1905	variety	subsp. uniflora	= het.
Silene mauritanica Pott ex Rohrb.	1869	species	subsp. uniflora	= het., not validly publ.
Silene montana Arrond.	1863	species	subsp. uniflora	= het.
Silene stenophylla Planellas	1852	species	subsp. uniflora	= het., nom. illeg.
Silene stenophylla var. micra Planellas	1852	variety	subsp. uniflora	= het.
Silene thorei Dufour	1825	species	subsp. thorei	≡ hom.
Silene uniflora subsp. cratericola (Franco) Franco	1986	subspecies	subsp. uniflora	= het.
Silene uniflora var. montana (Arrond.) Kerguélen	1986	variety	subsp. uniflora	= het.
Silene venosa proles maritima (With.) Samp.	1911	proles	subsp. uniflora	= het.
Silene venosa subsp. alpina (Lam.) Simonk.	1877	subspecies	subsp. uniflora	= het.
Silene venosa var. maritima (With.) Menezes	1914	variety	subsp. uniflora	= het.
Silene vulgaris subsp. alpina (Lam.) Nyman	1878	subspecies	subsp. uniflora	= het.
Silene vulgaris subsp. cratericola Franco	1971	subspecies	subsp. uniflora	= het.
Silene vulgaris subsp. maritima (With.) Á.Löve & D.Löve	1961	subspecies	subsp. uniflora	= het.
Silene vulgaris subsp. thorei (Dufour) Chater & Walters	1964	subspecies	subsp. thorei	≡ hom.
Silene willdenowii Sweet ex O.Schwarz	1949	species	subsp. uniflora	= het.
Viscago maritima With.	1796	species	subsp. uniflora	= het.
Wahlbergella uniflora (Roth) Fr.	1843	species	S. uniflora	≡ hom.
Notes: ≡ homotypic synonym; = heterotypic synonym

=== Names ===
Silene uniflora is known by the common name sea campion. The first use of this name dates to 1597.

== Range and habitat ==
Silene uniflora Silene uniflora is a maritime species growing in many European countries, but almost entirely along the coasts bordering the Atlantic Ocean and Baltic Sea. In northern Europe, it is native to the coasts of Scandinavia including Finland, Denmark, Sweden, Norway, and Russia as far east as the Kola Peninsula. It is also listed as native to Poland by POWO. It is not found in, or native to, the Baltic States or Russia on the Baltic Sea. In western Europe, it is native to the west coast of France, the northern coast of Spain, and a limited area in northern Portugal. It grows all around the shores of Ireland and the United Kingdom, and is also found in some mountainous areas near fresh water, though only rarely. Further out in the Atlantic Ocean, it is native to the Azores, the Canary Islands, Madeira, and Iceland.

It has been introduced to Germany, Argentina, and New Zealand.

It is one of the long-lived perennial plant species that establish on coastal shingle that has been stable for between five and twenty years. It also grows in the dunes and at the strandline on beaches.
