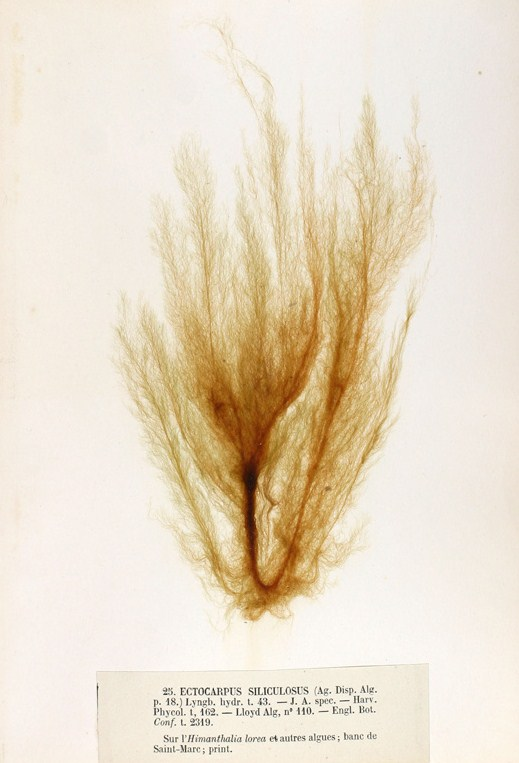
- Ectocarpus siliculosus

Scientific classification
- Domain: Eukaryota
- Clade: Diaphoretickes
- Clade: SAR
- Clade: Stramenopiles
- Phylum: Gyrista
- Subphylum: Ochrophytina
- Class: Phaeophyceae
- Order: Ectocarpales
- Family: Ectocarpaceae; C.Agardh

Genera
- Ectocarpus; Kuckuckia; Pleurocladia; Spongostema

= Ectocarpaceae =

Family of seaweeds

Ectocarpaceae is a family of brown algae in the order Ectocarpales. It includes four genera, Ectocarpus, Kuckuckia, Pleurocladia, and Spongostema.
