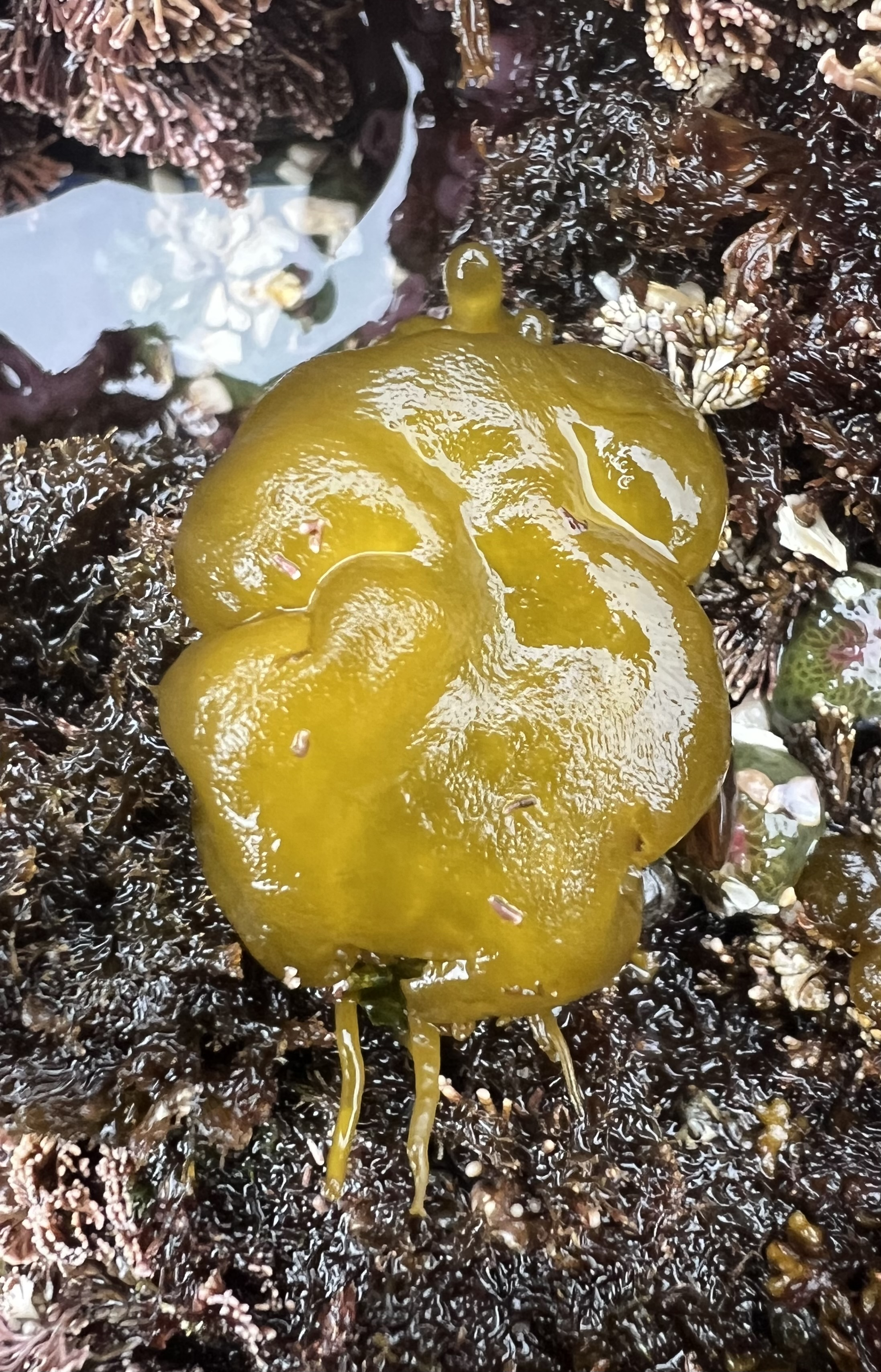
- Leathesia marina

Scientific classification
- Domain: Eukaryota
- Clade: Sar
- Clade: Stramenopiles
- Division: Ochrophyta
- Class: Phaeophyceae
- Order: Ectocarpales
- Family: Chordariaceae
- Genus: Leathesia; S.F.Gray, 1821

= Leathesia =

Genus of algae

Leathesia is a genus of brown algae belonging to the family Chordariaceae.

The genus has cosmopolitan distribution.

Species:

- Leathesia berkeleyi (Greville) Harvey
- Leathesia difformis L.
- Leathesia marina (Lyngb.) Decne.
- Leathesia mucosa Feldmann, 1935
- Leathesia nana S. & G.
- Leathesia umbellata (C.Agardh) Endlichter
