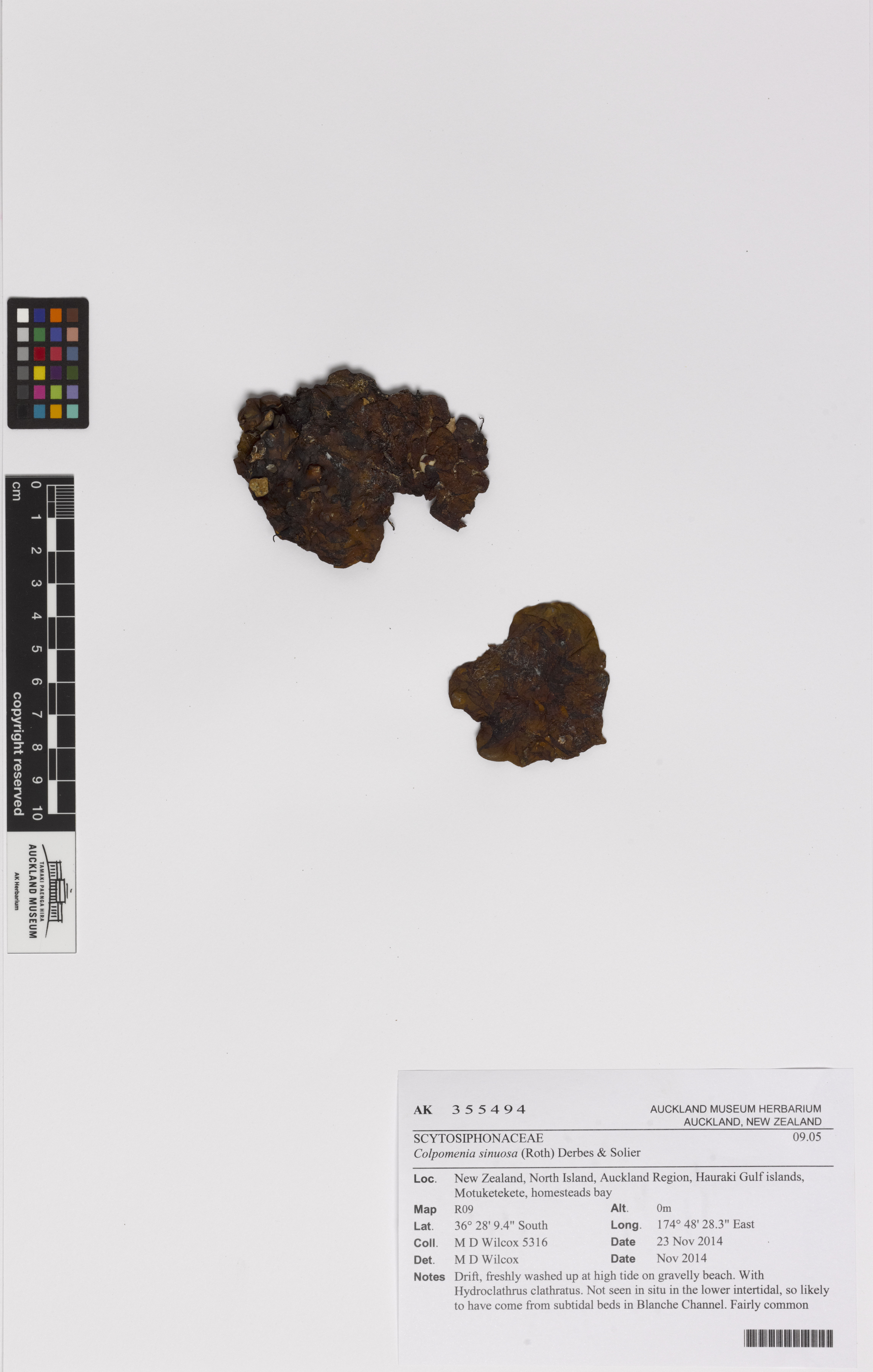
- Colpomenia sinuosa

Scientific classification
- Domain: Eukaryota
- Clade: Sar
- Clade: Stramenopiles
- Division: Ochrophyta
- Class: Phaeophyceae
- Order: Ectocarpales
- Family: Scytosiphonaceae
- Genus: Colpomenia (Endl.) Derbès & Solier, 1851

Type species
- Colpomenia sinuosa (Mertens ex Roth) Derbès & Solier

= Colpomenia =

Genus of seaweeds

Colpomenia is a genus of brown macroalgae (or seaweed) in the family Scytosiphonaceae.

== Taxonomy and Nomenclature ==
Colpomenia is currently composed of 11 confirmed species with Colpomenia sinuosa as its type species. Earlier taxonomic placements of the members of this genus have been problematic starting from the ambiguous morphological delineation up until the discovery of the polyphyly within the genus using molecular data. Two significant taxonomic revisions have been started to clarify the polyphyly within the genus. First, was the transfer of all previous members of Colpomenia with erect, finger-like thalli into the new genus Dactylosiphon based on morphoanatomical, molecular, and life history observations. Second, was the formal separation of Colpomenia tuberculata (now Encephalophycus tuberculatus) from the rest of the genus due to the stark differences in its morphology molecular phylogeny.

=== List of species ===
- Colpomenia borea Dy, M.Hoshino, T.Abe, Yotsukura, K.M.Lee, S.M.Boo, N.Klochkova & Kogame
- Colpomenia claytoniae S.M.Boo, K.M.Lee, G.Y.Cho & W.Nelson
- Colpomenia ecuticulata M.J.Parsons
- Colpomenia expansa (De A.Saunders) Y.-P.Lee
- Colpomenia mollis W.R.Taylor
- Colpomenia hasanainii Aisha & M.Shameel
- Colpomenia nainativensis Durairatnam
- Colpomenia peregrina Sauvageau
- Colpomenia ramosa W.R.Taylor
- Colpomenia sinuosa (Mertens ex Roth) Derbès & Solier (type)

== Morphology ==
The morphology of this genus has been a great This genus is characterized by having a saccate thallus that could be globular, tuberculate, and branched; membrane thickness of about 150–500 μm; 1–3 layers of ovoidal or polygonal cells for the cortex; 2–6 layers of medullary cells; and sori that are associated with 1–3 celled paraphyses (ascocysts).

== Distribution ==
Colpomenia is a cosmopolitan genera and is found from the tropics up to the Arctic.

== Ecology ==
Colpomenia species can either be epilithic (attached on a substrate) or epiphytic (attached on another seaweed) and could observed from the intertidal zone up to the shallow subtidal.

== Life history ==
There are three observed life history strategies for this genus: (1) heteromorphic diplohaplontic, the gametophyte (N) and sporophyte (2N) are both free-living and equally distinct bodies, however, the gametophyte (N) has a diminutive form and releases anisogamous (i.e., unequal in form and size) gametes to form the zygote (2N) which will later on develop into the sporophyte (2N) that will release unispores that will develop into the gametophytes (N); (2) heteromorphic, monophasic, wherein the female gamete (N) alone gives rise to the sporophyte (2N), and the female unispore develops into the gametophyte; and lastly, (3) monomorphic monophasic, the sporophyte independently regenerates through the production of plurispores while the gametophytes also independently grow via the production and settlement of its zooids.

== Exploitation, harvesting, and cultivation ==
There is no known culture technology for Colpomenia species and it is not traditionally being consumed.

== Chemical composition and natural products chemistry ==
Natural product chemistry research on this genus has revealed that it harbors important bioactive compounds (i.e., sulfated polysaccharides) that have the potential to limit tumor growth.

== Utilization and management ==
This genus is not commercially utilized and it is not threatened therefore there are no management strategies applied to this genus.
