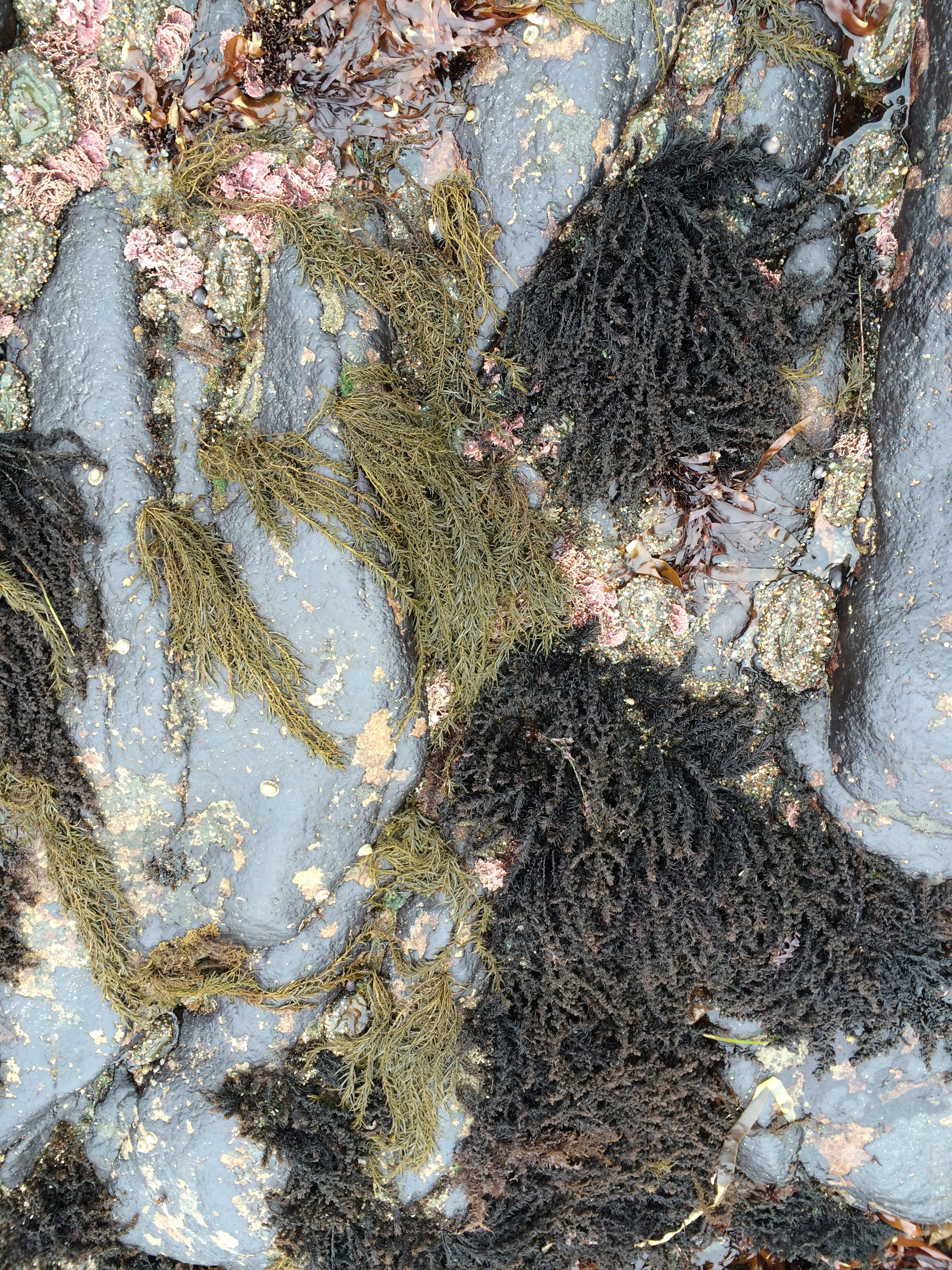
- Neorhodomela larix with Analipus japonicus, Cambria, California

Scientific classification
- Domain: Eukaryota
- Supergroup: Archaeplastida
- Division: Rhodophyta
- Class: Florideophyceae
- Order: Ceramiales
- Family: Rhodomelaceae
- Genus: Neorhodomela
- Species: N. larix

Binomial name
- Neorhodomela larix (Turner) Masuda 1982

Synonyms
- Fucus larix Turner 1819; Rhodomela larix (Turner) C.Agardh 1822; Lophura larix (Turner) Kützing 1849; Fuscaria larix (Turner) Ruprecht 1850

= Neorhodomela larix =

Black pine Neorhodomela larix

Species of alga

Neorhodomela larix, commonly known as black pine, is a species of red algae native to coastal areas of the North Pacific, from Mexico to the Bering Sea to Japan. It forms dense mats on semi-exposed rocks in intertidal areas. The thallus is dark brown to black in color with whorled branches resembling a bottlebrush or a pine tree's branches.

== Ecology ==
The brown alga Soranthera ulvoidea is commonly found as an epiphyte on Neorhodomela species, especially N. larix Isabella Abbott notes that individuals of Soranthera growing on Neorhodomela species as a host differ from those found on other hosts by tending to be attached more broadly, thick walled, spherical, and occurring primarily in northern or central California.
