= Johann Rudolf Suter =

Johann Rudolf Suter (29 March 1766, Zofingen – 24 February 1827, Bern) was a Swiss physician, botanist and philologist.

== Life ==
He studied natural history at the University of Göttingen, obtaining his PhD in 1787. From 1791 to 1793, he studied medicine at Mainz, and after receiving his medical doctorate at Göttingen (1794), he became a medical practitioner in his hometown of Zofingen.

From 1798 to 1801, he was a member of the council for the Helvetian Republic, and afterwards was a practicing physician and private scientist in Bern (1801–1804) and Zofingen (1811–1820). In 1820 he was appointed a professor of philosophy and Greek at the Academy of Bern.

He was the author of the two-volume Flora Helvetica (1802). The plant genus Sutera (family Scrophulariaceae) was named in his honor by German botanist Albrecht Wilhelm Roth (1807).
