= Festuca alpina =

Scientific classification
- Kingdom: Plantae
- Clade: Tracheophytes
- Clade: Angiosperms
- Clade: Monocots
- Clade: Commelinids
- Order: Poales
- Family: Poaceae
- Subfamily: Pooideae
- Genus: Festuca
- Species: F. alpina

Binomial name
- Festuca alpina Suter

Synonyms
- Festuca alpina var. gaucheri (St.-Yves) Kerguélen, (1975); Festuca alpina subsp. riverae Chas, Kerguélen & Plonka, (1993); Festuca alpina var. subviolacea Ducommun, (1869); Festuca alpina var. suteri St.-Yves, Litard., (1922); Festuca alpina var. viridis Ducommun, (1869); Festuca ovina subsp. alpina (Suter) W.D.J.Koch, (1838); Festuca ovina var. suteri St.-Yves, (1922); Festuca malyi Widder, God. Biol. Inst. Sarajevu (1953); Festuca micevskiana Kostad., Godišen Zborn., (2005); Festuca ovina subvar. gaucheri (St.-Yves) St.-Yves, (1923); Festuca ovina var. gaucheri St.-Yves,(1922); Poa ovina var. alpina (Suter) Wimm. & Grab., (1827)

Species of plant

Festuca alpina, also known as the alphine fescue, is a species of grass in the genus Festuca. It grows in rocky habitats in many of the mountain chains across Europe, in the countries of Austria, Czechoslovakia, France, Germany, Italy, Spain, Switzerland and Yugoslavia.

When regarded as an aggregate group, the Festuca alpina group includes a number of other taxa, with Festuca alfrediana as the most notable.

== Characteristics ==
=== Leaves ===
Festuca alpina can grow up to 6 to 20 centimetres high. Its leaves are curled into bristles, are less than 0.5 millimetres wide, and have a green hue. Leaf sheaths of non-flowering shoots are closed to about the middle.

=== Flowers ===
Ligules are less than 0.5 millimetres long, its panicles are 1.5 to 3 centimetres long, and its spikelets are 6 centimetres long in a pale green hue. Lemmas are about 3.5 to 4.2 millimetres in length, with awns about 3 to 4 millimetres long. Its anthers are between 0.8 and 1.5 millimetres in length (rarely up to 2mm), while its ovaries are glabrous. Flowering period: July to August.
