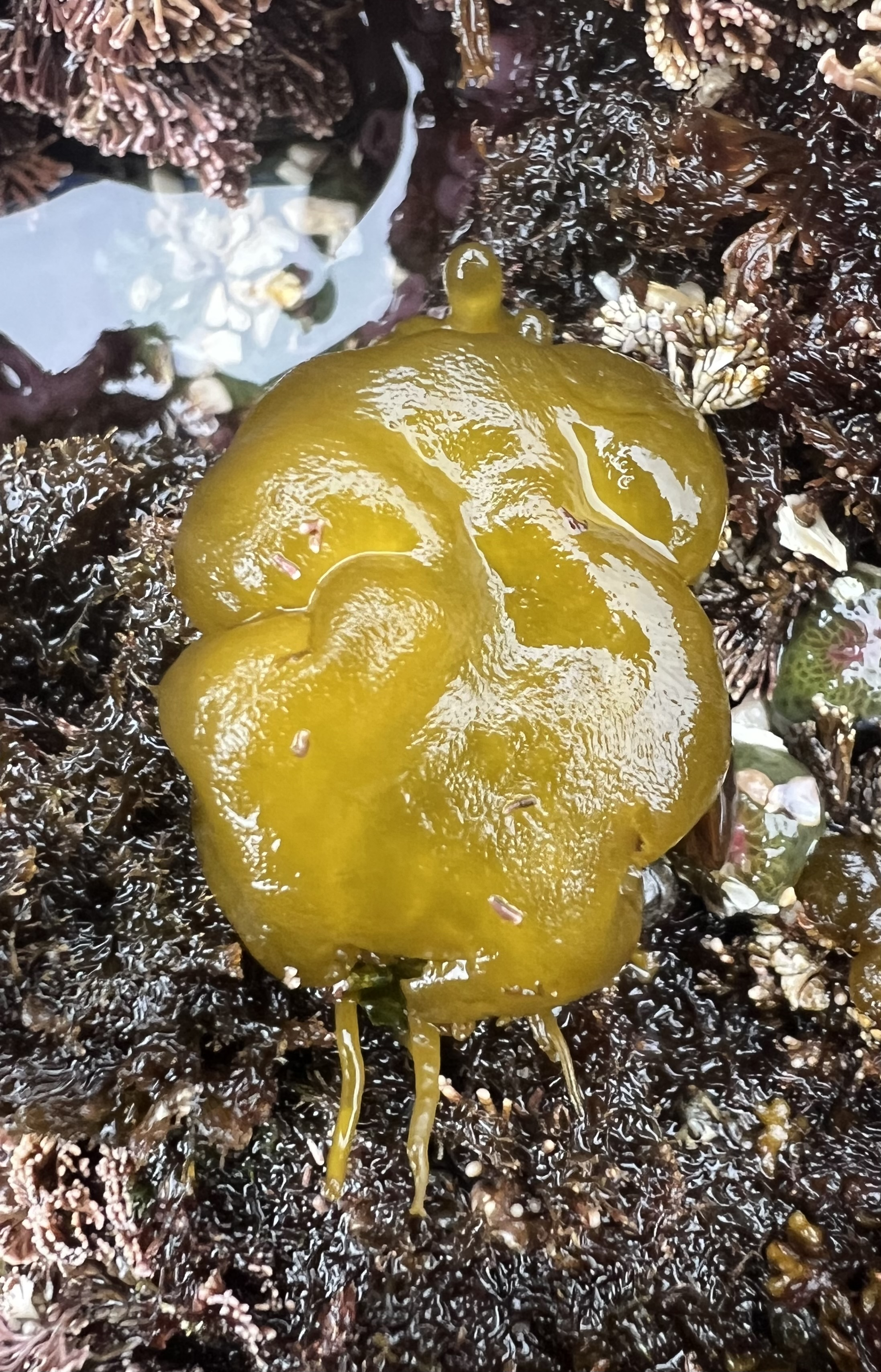
- Leathesia marina on Seppings Island, British Columbia

Scientific classification
- Domain: Eukaryota
- Supergroup: Stramenopiles
- Division: Ochrophyta
- Class: Phaeophyceae
- Order: Ectocarpales
- Family: Chordariaceae
- Genus: Leathesia
- Species: L. marina

Binomial name
- Leathesia marina (Lyngbye]]) Decaisne

Synonyms
- Leathesia difformis

= Leathesia marina =

Species of seaweed

Leathesia marina (Lyngbye) Decaisne, 1842, previously known as Leathesia difformis Areschoug, 1847, commonly known as the sea cauliflower the sea potato, and brown brains is a species of littoral brown algae in the class Phaeophyceae and the order Ectocarpales, which is commonly attached to other seaweeds and sometimes rocks. When young, the organism is solid but as it matures it becomes hollow and somewhat convoluted and has the appearance of a small leathery brown bag about the same size as a tennis ball. The texture is rubbery and the outer surface smooth.

These brain-like brown seaweeds can be found growing on rock or as epiphytes on other seaweeds in the mid to low intertidal. Individuals can grow to ~15 centimetres (5.9 in) in diameter. Young individuals can resemble other globular forms of algae, such as Soranthera ulvoidea. To determine if it is Leathesia, squeeze and flatten a piece between your fingers. Leathesia will break apart into filaments whereas other globular forms will flatten but remain intact.

== Taxonomy ==
A 2011 study using phylogenetics found the following relationships between L. difformis and the rest of Chordariaceae.

- Chordariaceae
  - Myrionema papilosum
  - - - Myractula clandestina
      - Elachista fucicola
    - - Striaria attenuata
      - - - Litosiphon laminariae
          - Elachista flaccida
        - - Elachista scutulata
          - - - Punctaria latifolia
              - Asperococcus bullosus
            - - - Ulonema rhizophorum
                - Myrionema strangulans
              - - Ddictyosiphon foeniculaceus
                - - - Chordaria flagelliformis
                    - Soranthera ulvoidea
                  - - Corynophlaea crispa
                    - Leathesia difformis (L. marina)

=== Synonyms ===
According to WoRMS (October 2023):

- Clavatella nostoc-marina Bory de Saint-Vincent, 1823
- Leathesia amplissima Setchell & N.L.Gardner, 1924
- Leathesia difformis Areschoug, 1847
- Nostoc marinum C.Agardh, 1810
- Nostoc mesentericum C.Agardh, 1824
- Rivularia tuberiformis Smith, 1809
