= Franz Carl Mertens =

German botanist (1764–1831)

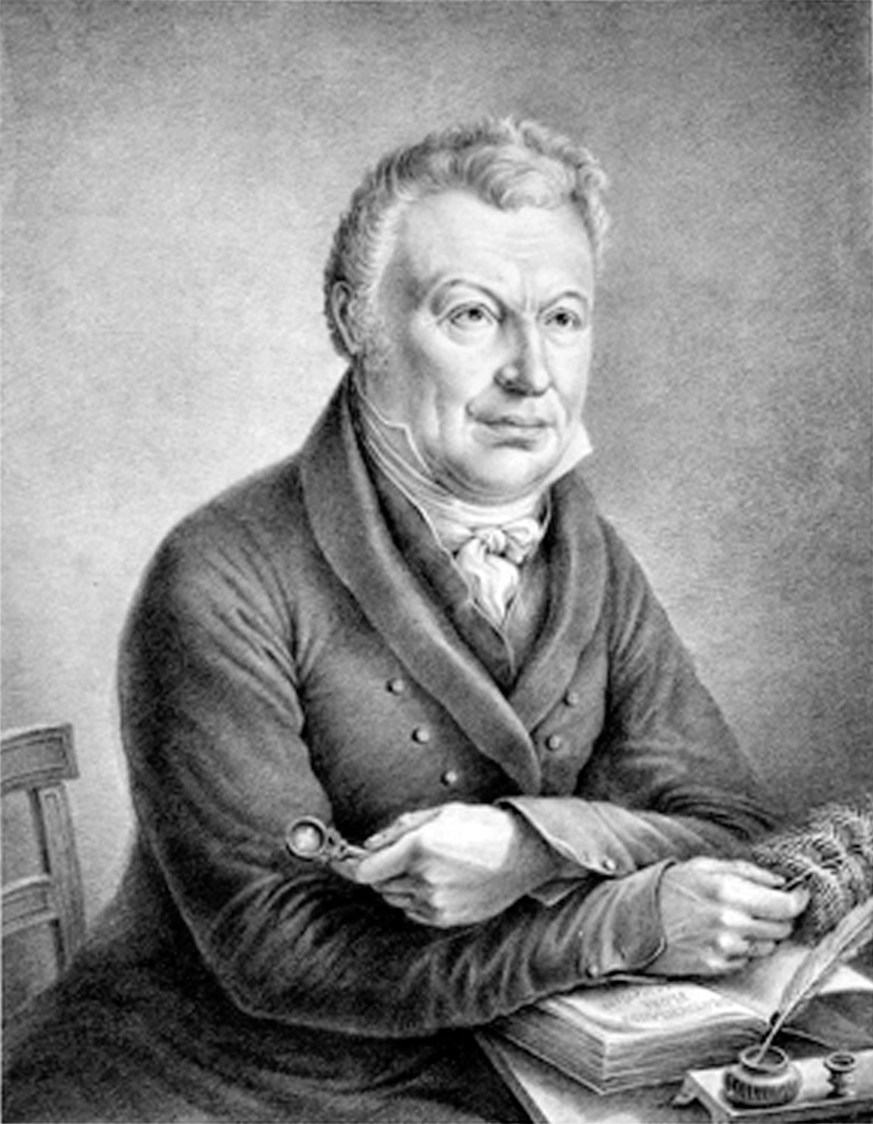
- Born: April 3, 1764
- Died: June 19, 1831 (aged 67)
- Education: University of Halle
- Scientific career
- Fields: Botany

Franz Carl Mertens (3 April 1764 – 19 June 1831) was a German botanist who was a native of Bielefeld. He specialized in the field of phycology.

Mertens studied theology and languages at the University of Halle, and after graduation taught classes at Bremen Polytechnic College. In his spare time he studied botany, and through a mutual friend met German botanist Albrecht Wilhelm Roth (1757–1834). With Roth, he took scientific expeditions throughout Europe, including Scandinavia.

From these trips, Mertens described a number of species of algae. He also performed illustrative work on Volume 3 of Roth's Catalecta botanica. With Erlangen professor Wilhelm Daniel Joseph Koch (1771–1849), he published the third edition of Johann Christoph Röhling's Deutschlands flora, a five volume treatise on German flora. With Friedrich Heinrich Wilhelm Frölich and Johannes Nicolaus von Suhr he issued the exsiccata-like series Hydrophytorum tam indigenorum quam exoticorum collectio, Sammlung von einheimischen und auswärtigen Hydrophyten (1829). The plant genus Mertensia from the family Boraginaceae is named after him, while the ctenophore genus Mertensia is named after his son Karl Heinrich Mertens (1796–1830).

== See also ==
- European and American voyages of scientific exploration
