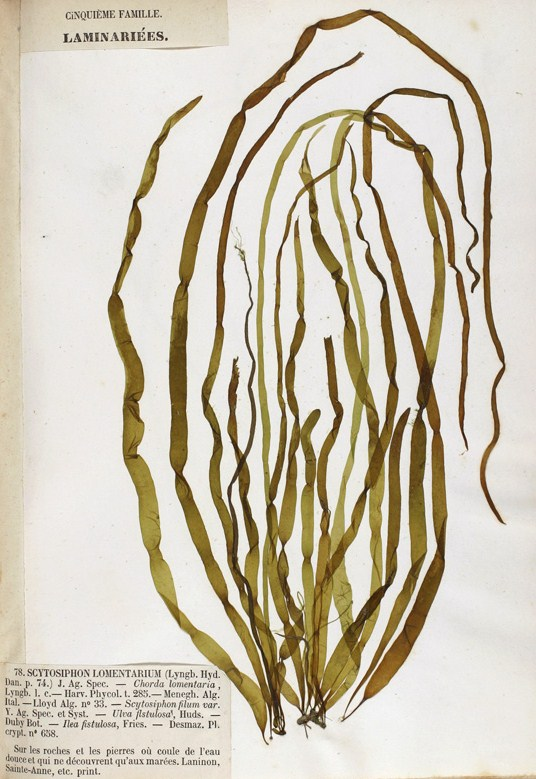
- Herbarium specimen of Scytosiphon lomentaria

Scientific classification
- Domain: Eukaryota
- Clade: Diaphoretickes
- Clade: SAR
- Clade: Stramenopiles
- Phylum: Gyrista
- Subphylum: Ochrophytina
- Class: Phaeophyceae
- Order: Ectocarpales
- Family: Scytosiphonaceae; Farlow

Synonyms
- Chnoosporaceae

= Scytosiphonaceae =

Family of seaweeds

Scytosiphonaceae is a family of brown algae in the order Ectocarpales.

Genera:

- Chnoospora J.Agardh
- Colpomenia (Endlicher) Derbès & Solier
- Hydroclathrus Bory
- Iyengaria Børgesen
- Jolyna S.M.P.B.Guimarães
- Melanosiphon M.J.Wynne
- Myelophycus Kjellman
- Petalonia Derbès & Solier
- Rosenvingea Børgesen
- Scytosiphon C.Agardh
- Symphyocarpus Rosenvinge
