= Albrecht Wilhelm Roth =

German physician and botanist (1757–1834)

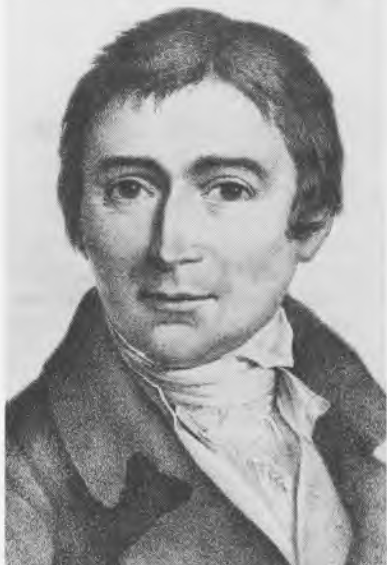
- Born: January 6, 1757; Dötlingen, Kingdom of Prussia, Holy Roman Empire
- Died: October 16, 1834 (aged 77); Bremen-Vegesack, Kingdom of Prussia
- Education: Martin Luther University of Halle-Wittenberg; University of Erlangen–Nuremberg
- Scientific career
- Fields: Botany

Albrecht Wilhelm Roth (6 January 1757 – 16 October 1834) was a medical doctor and botanist born in Dötlingen, Germany.

He studied medicine at the Universities of Halle and Erlangen, where he received his doctorate in 1778. After graduation, he practiced medicine in Dötlingen, and shortly afterwards relocated to Bremen-Vegesack. From 1785 to 1787 he issued an exsiccata under the title Herbarium vivum plantarum officinalium nebst einer Anweisung Pflanzen zum medizinischen Gebrauche zu sammeln.

Roth is remembered for his influential scientific publications, particularly in the field of botany. His botanical research and writings came to the attention of Johann Wolfgang von Goethe (1749–1832), who recommended Roth to a position at the botanical institute at the University of Jena.

Two of his better written works were Tentamen florae germanica (a treatise on German flora), and Novae plantarum species praesertim Indiae orientalis (a book of Indian flora). The latter work is primarily based on botanical specimens collected by Moravian missionary Benjamin Heyne (1770–1819).

The botanical genus Rothia from the family Fabaceae is named after him.

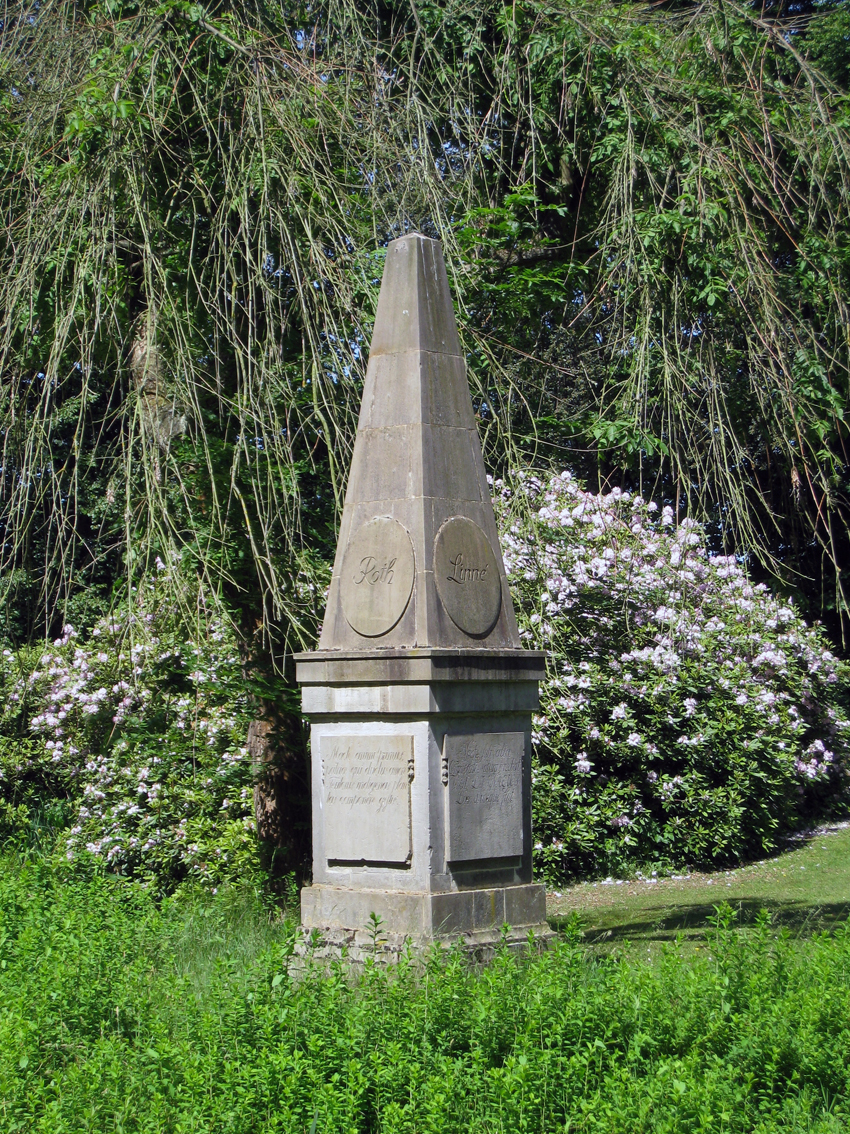
The Linnaeus Obelisk that commemorates the naturalists Carl von Linné, Albrecht Wilhelm Roth, Albrecht von Haller and Nikolaus Joseph von Jacquin

== Selected writings ==
- Anweisung für Anfänger Pflanzen zum Nutzen und Vergnügen zu sammlen und nach dem Linneischen System zu bestimmen, 1778.
- Beyträge zur Botanik, 1782–1783
- Tentamen florae germanicae, 1788–1800
- Catalecta botanica (with Franz Carl Mertens), 1797–1806
- Anweisung Pflanzen zum Nutzen und Vergnügen zu sammeln und nach dem Linneischen Systeme zu bestimmen, 1803.
- Novae plantarum species praesertim Indiae orientalis, 1821.
- Enumeratio plantarum phaenogamarum in Germania sponte nascentium, 1827
- Manuale botanicum, 1830
