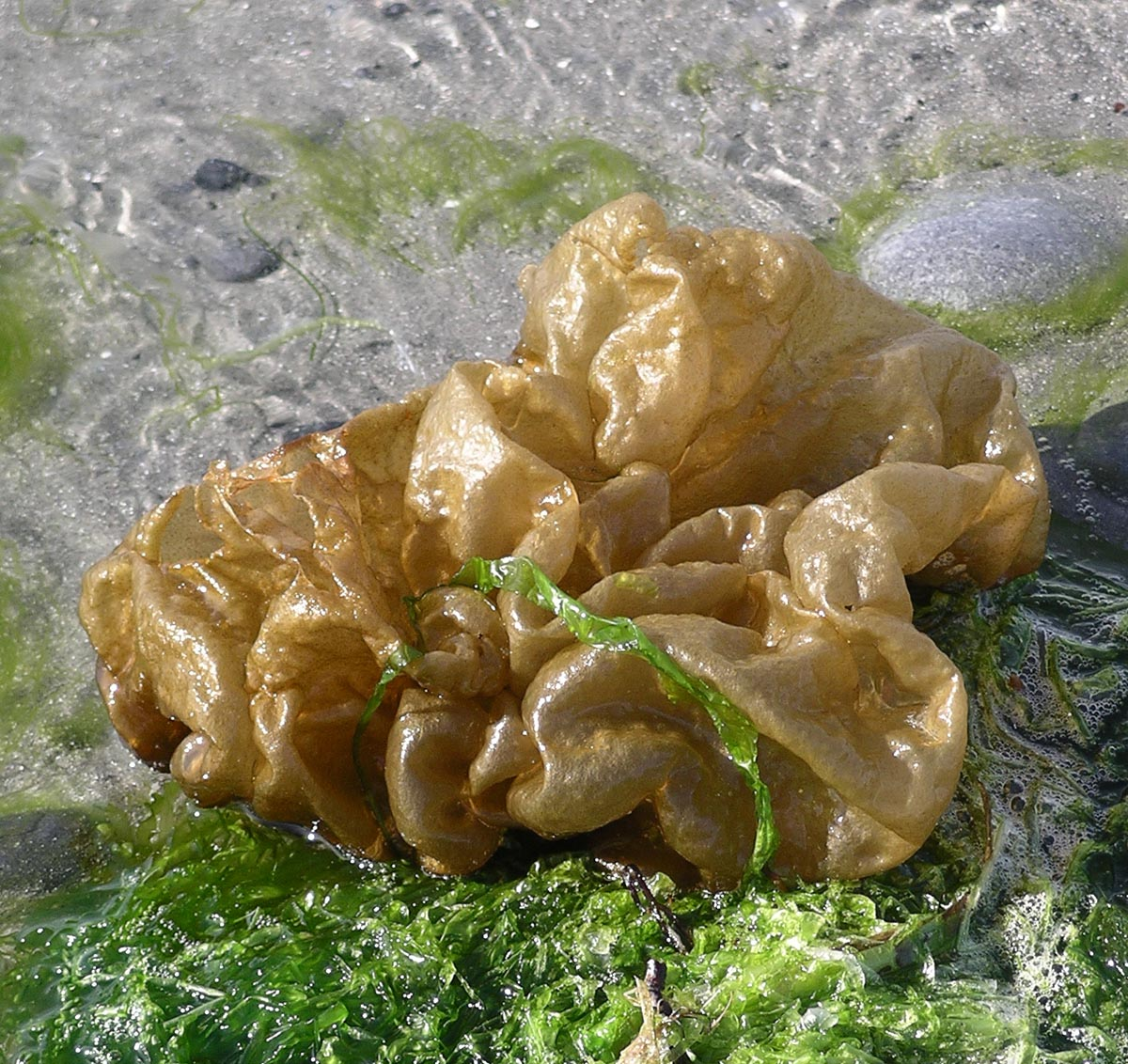
- Leathesia difformis

Scientific classification
- Domain: Eukaryota
- Clade: Diaphoretickes
- Clade: Sar
- Clade: Stramenopiles
- Phylum: Gyrista
- Subphylum: Ochrophytina
- Class: Phaeophyceae
- Subclass: Fucophycidae
- Order: Ectocarpales; Setchell & N.L.Gardner

Families
- Acinetosporaceae; Adenocystaceae; Chordariaceae; Ectocarpaceae; Petrospongiaceae; Scytosiphonaceae

Synonyms
- Chordariales Setchell & N.L.Gardner; Dictyosiphonales Setchell & N.L.Gardner; Scytosiphonales Feldmann

= Ectocarpales =

Order of algae

Ectocarpales is a very large order in the brown algae (class Phaeophyceae). The order includes families with pseudoparenchymatous (Splachnidiaceae) or true parenchymatous (Scytosiphonaceae) tissue. Pseudoparenchymatous refers to a filamentous alga with cells packed very close together to give an appearance of parenchymatous tissue, the latter being composed of cells which can truly divide in three dimensions, unusual among the algae. Filamentous algae are composed of cells that divide along a single plane, allowing only elongation to form filaments of one or more rows of cells. Algae that can divide in two planes can form sheet-like thalli or bodies. Cells that can divide in a third plane potentially allow for the organism to develop a more complex body plan, and diversification of body plans into an erect thallus of some sort and a holdfast for attaching the upright portion to the substrate.

A 2014 classification recognizes the following families:

- Acinetosporaceae Hamel ex J Feldmann
- Adenocystaceae F Rousseau, B. de Reviers, M.-C. Leclerc, A Asensi, and R Delépine
- Chordariaceae Greville
- Ectocarpaceae C Agardh
- Petrospongiaceae Racault et al.
- Scytosiphonaceae Farlow
