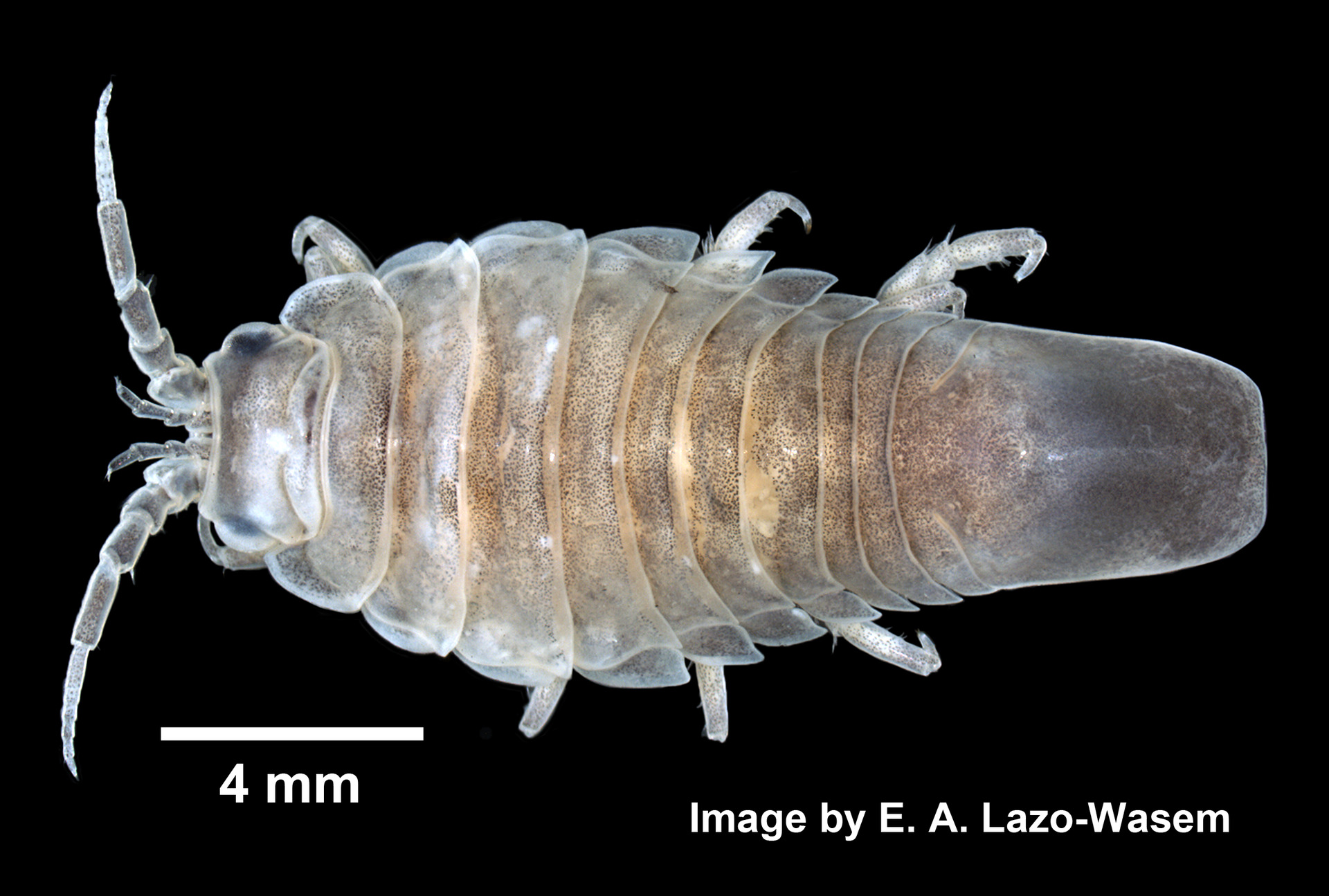

Scientific classification
- Kingdom: Animalia
- Phylum: Arthropoda
- Class: Malacostraca
- Order: Isopoda
- Family: Idoteidae
- Genus: Idotea
- Species: I. metallica

Binomial name
- Idotea metallica Bosc, 1802

Synonyms
- Idotea brevicornis Rathke, 1843

= Idotea metallica =

Species of crustacean

Idotea metallica, also known as the metallic isopod, is a species of isopod in the family Idoteidae. It can be recognised by its metallic blue colouration and by the blunt, squared-off shape of the telson. It is found worldwide drifting on debris on high seas. It often gets blown inshore, where it is outcompeted by related species such as Idotea balthica.
