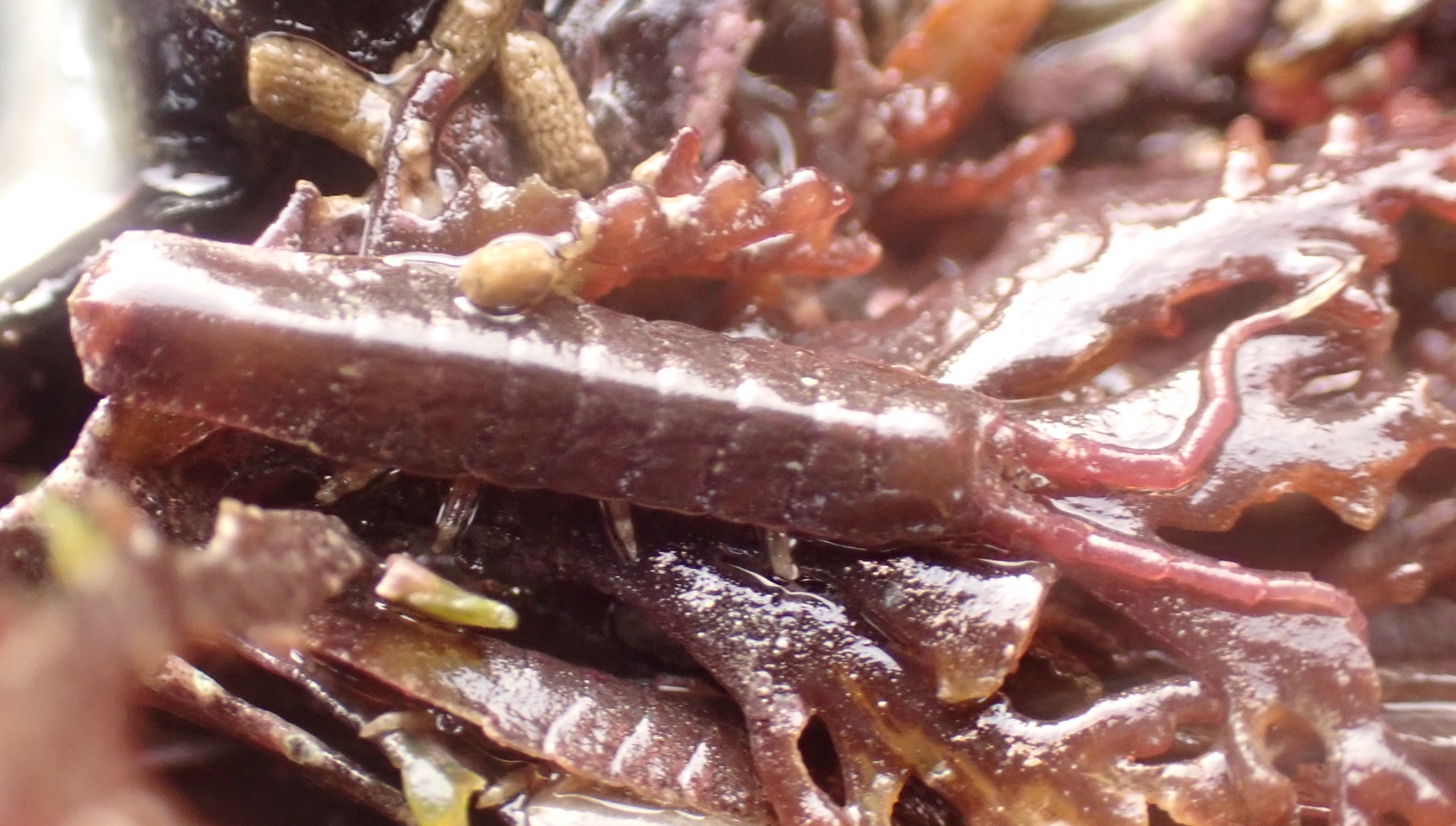

Scientific classification
- Kingdom: Animalia
- Phylum: Arthropoda
- Class: Malacostraca
- Order: Isopoda
- Family: Idoteidae
- Genus: Idotea
- Species: I. urotoma

Binomial name
- Idotea urotoma Stimpson, 1864

Synonyms
- Idotaea rectilinea Lockington, 1877; Idotea rectilineata Richardson, 1899; Pentidotea urotoma (Stimpson, 1864)

= Idotea urotoma =

Species of crustacean

Idotea urotoma, the blunt-tailed isopod, is a species of marine isopod which can be found in the low intertidal and shallow subtidal zones, from Puget Sound in the U.S. state of Washington to Baja California in Mexico.

== Description ==
Idotea urotoma is variable in appearance, but it typically matches the color of the seaweed or seagrass on which it is found, ranging from yellowish gold to reddish brown or black. At the telson or the rear end of the organism's body, the margin is broadly triangular, where the right and left sides converge without a distinct median projection. This feature distinguishes the blunt-tailed isopod from other similar isopods. Also, along with I. rufescensand I. ochotensis, the blunt-tailed isopod is the only other Idotea species that has a maxilliped palp with four rather than five articles.

== Natural History ==
Like other isopods, the blunt-tailed isopod is gonochoric. Mating usually occurs before and sometimes during the time of molting.
