= Brentisentis =

Scientific classification
- Kingdom: Animalia
- Phylum: Acanthocephala
- Class: Palaeacanthocephala
- Order: Echinorhynchida
- Family: Illiosentidae
- Genus: Brentisentis; Leotta, Schmidt & Kuntz, 1982

Type species
- Brentisentis

Genus of parasitic worms

Brentisentis is a genus in Acanthocephala (thorny-headed worms, also known as spiny-headed worms).

== Taxonomy ==
The genus was described by Leotta, Schmidt & Kuntz in 1982. Phylogenetic analysis has been published on any Brentisentis yangtzensis.

== Description ==
Brentisentis species consist of a proboscis covered in hooks and a trunk.

== Species ==
The genus Brentisentis contains three species.

- Brentisentis chongqingensis Wei, 1998

The species name chongqingensis was named after the location where the samples were collected: Chongqing, China.

- Brentisentis uncinus Leotta, Schmidt, Kuntz, 1982

B. uncinus was found infesting the small intestines of the Tank goby (Glossogobius giuris) and Eleotris pisonis near the mouth of Keelung River, Taiwan.

- Brentisentis yangtzensis Yu and Wu, 1989

== Distribution ==
The distribution of Brentisentis is determined by that of its hosts.

== Hosts ==
Life cycle of Acanthocephala. (Note: There are no known aberrant human infections for Brentisentis species.)

The life cycle of an acanthocephalan consists of three stages beginning when an infective acanthor (development of an egg) is released from the intestines of the definitive host and then ingested by an arthropod, the intermediate host. Although the intermediate hosts of Brentisentis are arthropods. When the acanthor molts, the second stage called the acanthella begins. This stage involves penetrating the wall of the mesenteron or the intestine of the intermediate host and growing. The final stage is the infective cystacanth which is the larval or juvenile state of an Acanthocephalan, differing from the adult only in size and stage of sexual development. The cystacanths within the intermediate hosts are consumed by the definitive host, usually attaching to the walls of the intestines, and as adults they reproduce sexually in the intestines. The acanthor is passed in the feces of the definitive host and the cycle repeats. There may be paratenic hosts (hosts where parasites infest but do not undergo larval development or sexual reproduction) for Brentisentis.

Brentisentis parasitizes fish. There are no reported cases of Brentisentis infesting humans in the English language medical literature.

Hosts for Brentisentis species

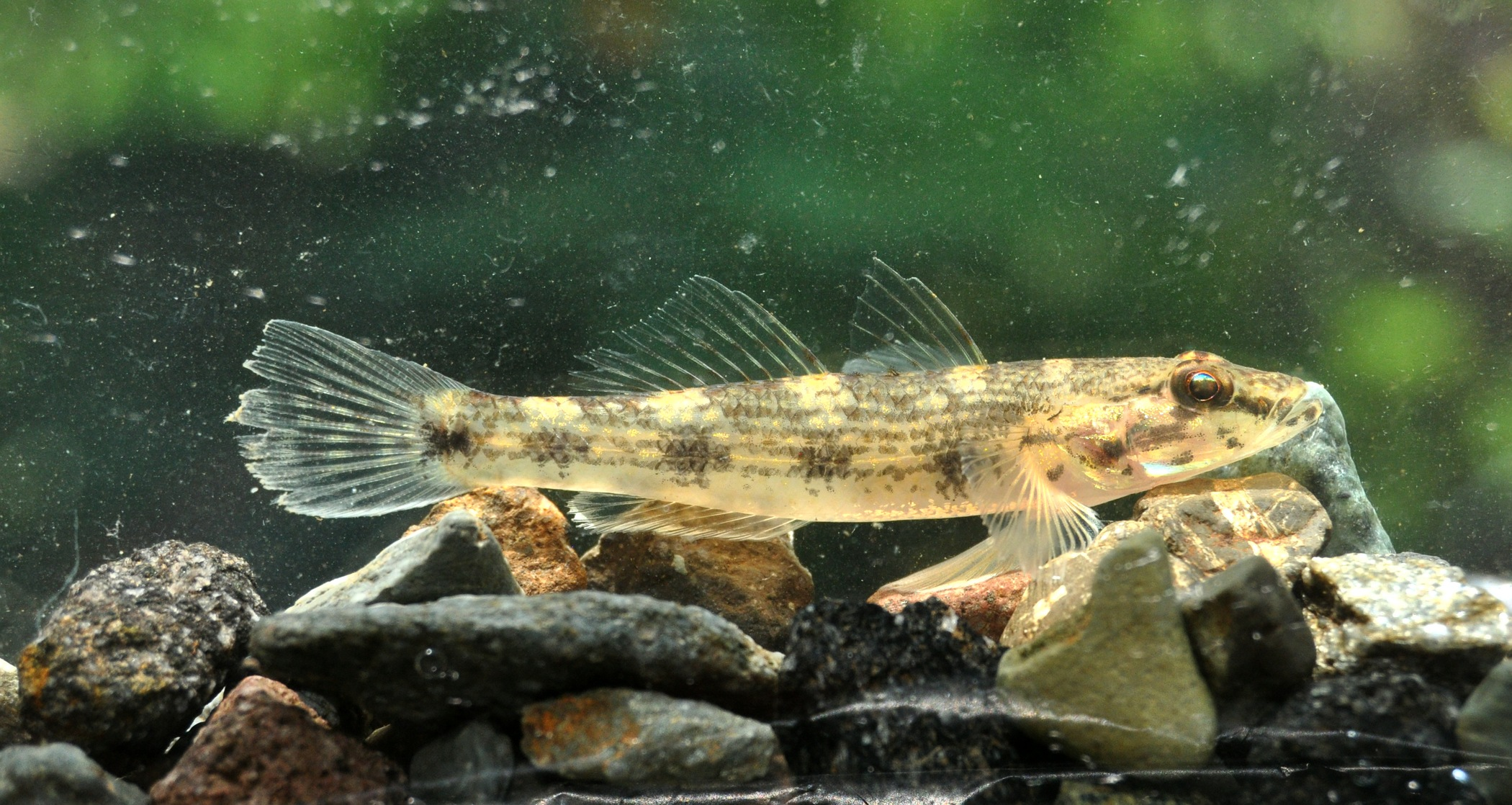
The tank goby is a host for B. uncinus
