= Idotea neglecta =

Scientific classification
- Kingdom: Animalia
- Phylum: Arthropoda
- Class: Malacostraca
- Order: Isopoda
- Family: Idoteidae
- Genus: Idotea
- Species: I. neglecta

Binomial name
- Idotea neglecta Sars, 1897

Species of crustacean

Idotea neglecta is a marine isopod in the family Idoteidae. It can be found on algae in the littoral and sublittoral zone of north-west European coasts.

== Distribution ==
I. neglecta can be found on all north-west European coasts.

== Description ==
Male I. neglecta measure 8 to 30 millimetres (0.3 to 1.2 in), females 10 to 16 millimetres (0.4 to 0.6 in). They are brownish, sometimes with white longitudinal lateral markings or white marbling over the dorsal surface. The pleotelson of adults has straight sides converging posteriorly.
