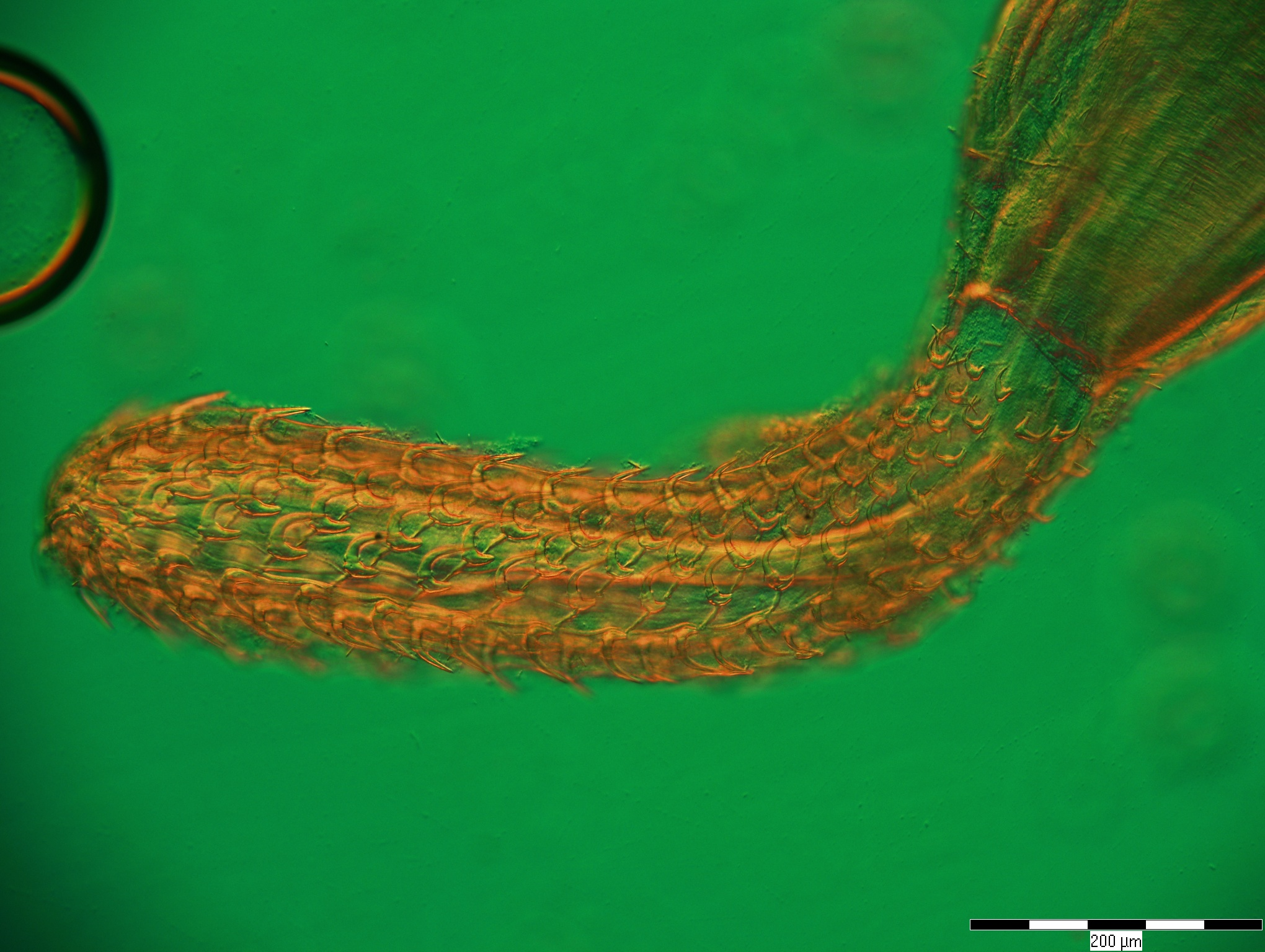
- Proboscis of Telosentis exiguus from the grass goby from Ukraine

Scientific classification
- Domain: Eukaryota
- Kingdom: Animalia
- Phylum: Rotifera
- Class: Palaeacanthocephala
- Order: Echinorhynchida
- Family: Illiosentidae
- Genus: Telosentis van Cleave, 1923

= Telosentis =

Genus of thorny-headed worms

Telosentis is a genus of acanthocephalans. The representatives of the genus are distributed in tropical waters of Indian Ocean, Pacific coast of Australia and Mediterranean. Consists of four species:

- Telosentis australiensis Edmond, 1964
- Telosentis exiguus (von Linstow, 1901)
- Telosentis lutianusi Gupta & Gupta, 1990
- Telosentis mizellei Gupta & Fatma, 1988
