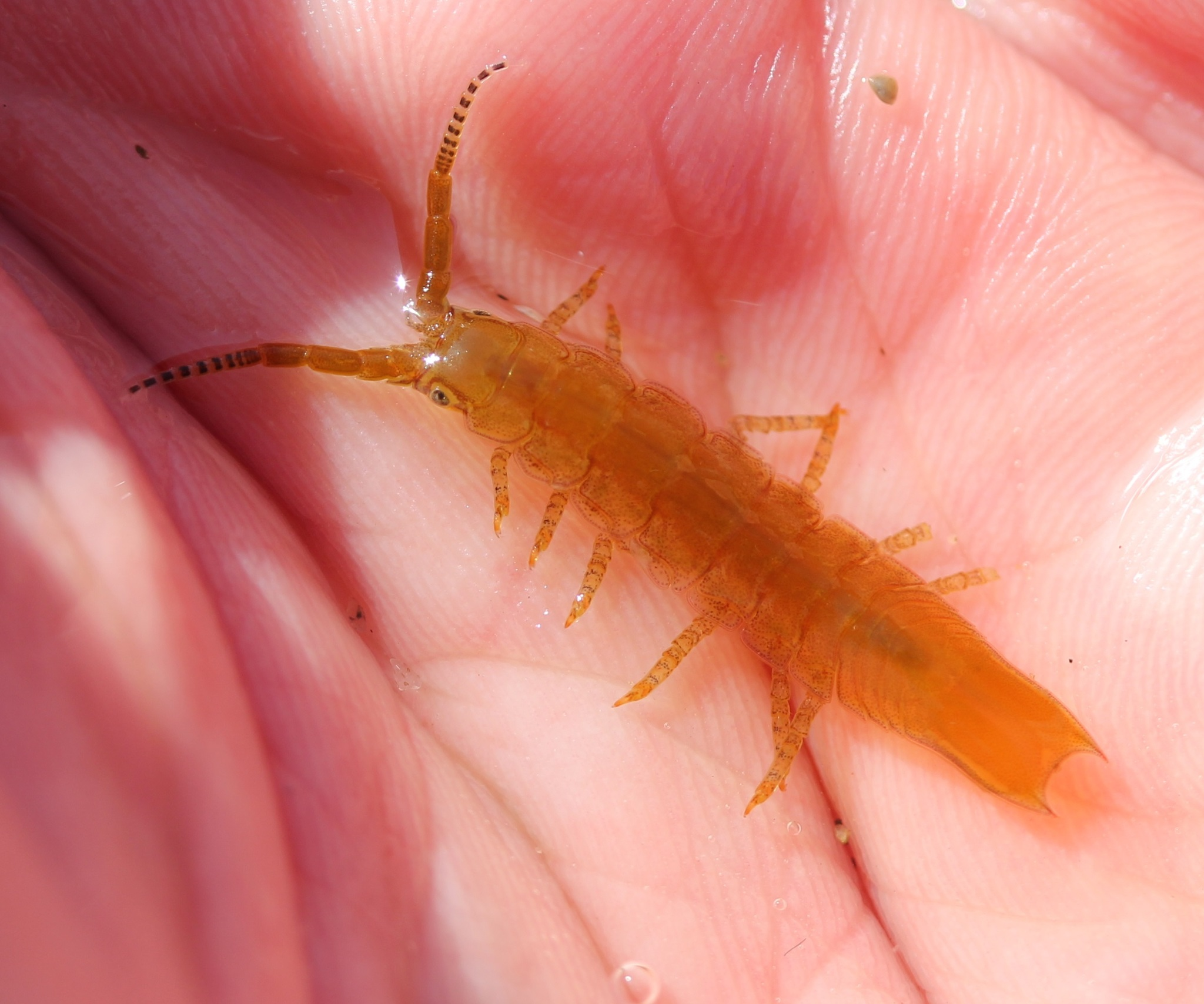

Scientific classification
- Kingdom: Animalia
- Phylum: Arthropoda
- Class: Malacostraca
- Order: Isopoda
- Family: Idoteidae
- Genus: Pentidotea
- Species: P. resecata

Binomial name
- Pentidotea resecata (Stimpson, 1857)

Synonyms
- Idotea resecata Stimpson, 1857

= Pentidotea resecata =

Species of crustacean

Pentidotea resecata, the eelgrass isopod, is a species of isopod in the family Idoteidae. It is found in North America, along the Pacific coast from Alaska and British Columbia south to Baja California Sur, and inhabits the shallow intertidal.
