= Metarhadinorhynchus =

Scientific classification
- Domain: Eukaryota
- Kingdom: Animalia
- Phylum: Rotifera
- Class: Palaeacanthocephala
- Order: Echinorhynchida
- Family: Illiosentidae
- Genus: Metarhadinorhynchus; Yamaguti, 1959

Genus of worms

Metarhadinorhynchus is a genus of worms belonging to the family Illiosentidae.

== Species ==
Species:

- Metarhadinorhynchus cyprini (Yin, 1961) Wang, 1986
- Metarhadinorhynchus cyprini Yin, 1961
- Metarhadinorhynchus echeneisi Gupta & Sinha, 1991
- Metarhadinorhynchus lateolabracis Yamaguti, 1959
- Metarhadinorhynchus thapari Gupta & Gupta, 1975
