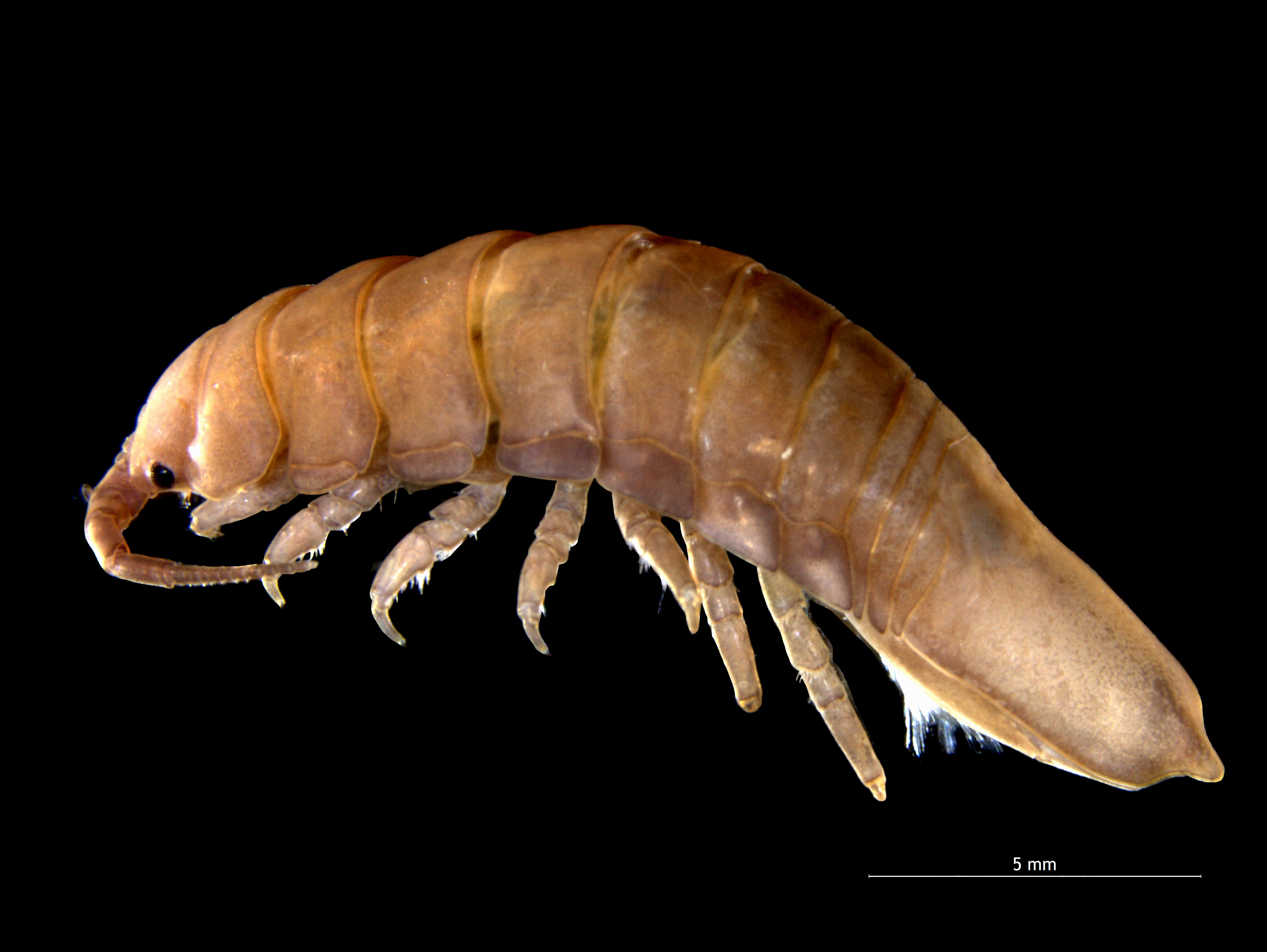

Scientific classification
- Kingdom: Animalia
- Phylum: Arthropoda
- Class: Malacostraca
- Order: Isopoda
- Family: Idoteidae
- Genus: Idotea
- Species: I. granulosa

Binomial name
- Idotea granulosa Rathke, 1843

Synonyms
- Idotea cretaria Dahl, 1916 (junior synonym)

= Idotea granulosa =

Species of crustacean

Idotea granulosa is a species of marine isopod in the family Idoteidae.
