= Koronacantha =

Scientific classification
- Kingdom: Animalia
- Phylum: Acanthocephala
- Class: Palaeacanthocephala
- Order: Echinorhynchida
- Family: Leptorhynchoididae
- Genus: Koronacantha; Monks & Ponce de Leon, 1996

Genus of parasitic worms

Koronacantha is a genus in Acanthocephala (thorny-headed worms, also known as spiny-headed worms).

== Taxonomy ==
The genus was described by Monks & Ponce de Leon in 1996. The National Center for Biotechnology Information does not indicate that any phylogenetic analysis has been published on any Koronacantha species that would confirm its position as a unique genus in the family Leptorhynchoididae.

== Description ==
Koronacantha species consist of a proboscis covered in hooks and a trunk.

== Species ==
The genus Koronacantha contains two species.

- Koronacantha mexicana Monks & Ponce de Leon, 1996
- Koronacantha pectinaria (Van Cleave, 1940) (Note: A binomial authority in parentheses indicates that the species was originally described in a genus other than Koronacantha . This species was originally named Tegorhynchus pectinarius by Van Cleave in 1940 but moved to Gigantorhynchus by Monks Marques and Pérez-Ponce de León in 1997.)

== Distribution ==
The distribution of Koronacantha is determined by that of its hosts. It is found in Chamela Bay, Jalisco, Mexico.

== Hosts ==
Life cycle of Acanthocephala. (Note: There are no known aberrant human infections for Koronacantha species.)

The life cycle of an acanthocephalan consists of three stages beginning when an infective acanthor (development of an egg) is released from the intestines of the definitive host and then ingested by an arthropod, the intermediate host. Although the intermediate hosts of Koronacantha are arthropods. When the acanthor molts, the second stage called the acanthella begins. This stage involves penetrating the wall of the mesenteron or the intestine of the intermediate host and growing. The final stage is the infective cystacanth which is the larval or juvenile state of an Acanthocephalan, differing from the adult only in size and stage of sexual development. The cystacanths within the intermediate hosts are consumed by the definitive host, usually attaching to the walls of the intestines, and as adults they reproduce sexually in the intestines. The acanthor is passed in the feces of the definitive host and the cycle repeats. There may be paratenic hosts (hosts where parasites infest but do not undergo larval development or sexual reproduction) for Koronacantha.

Koronacantha parasitizes marine fish by attaching to the wall of the intestine. There are no reported cases of Koronacantha infesting humans in the English language medical literature.

Hosts for Koronacantha species

The burrito grunt (Anisotremus interruptus) is a host of K. mexicanus

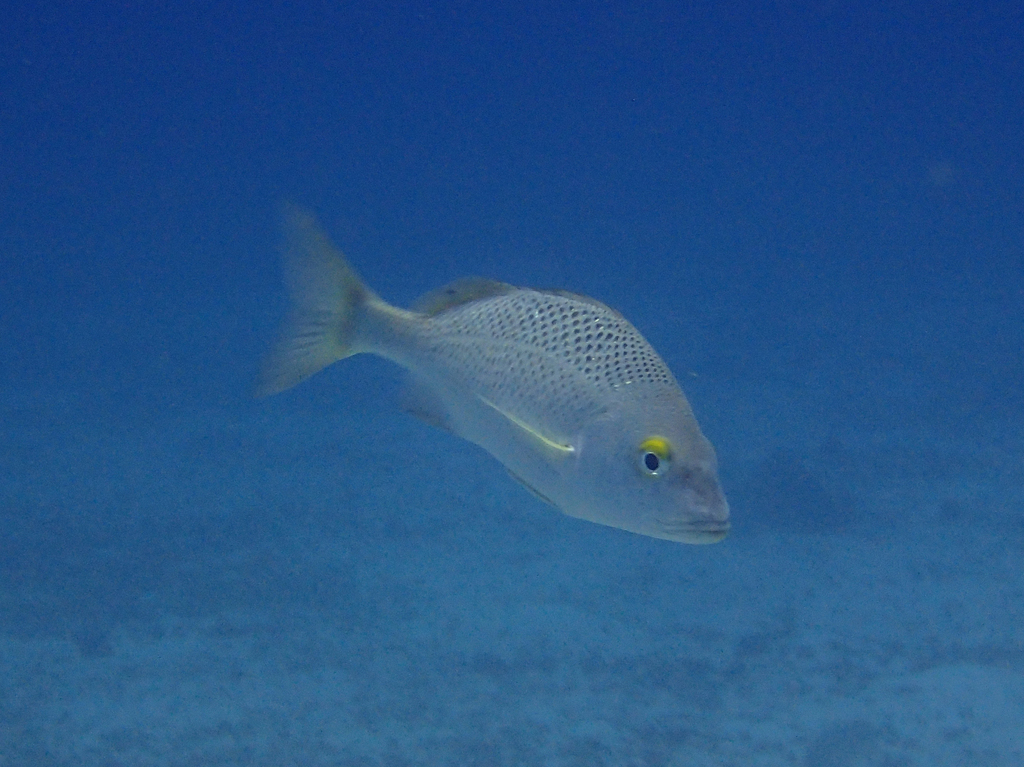
Haemulon scudderii, the grey grunt, is a host of K. mexicanus
