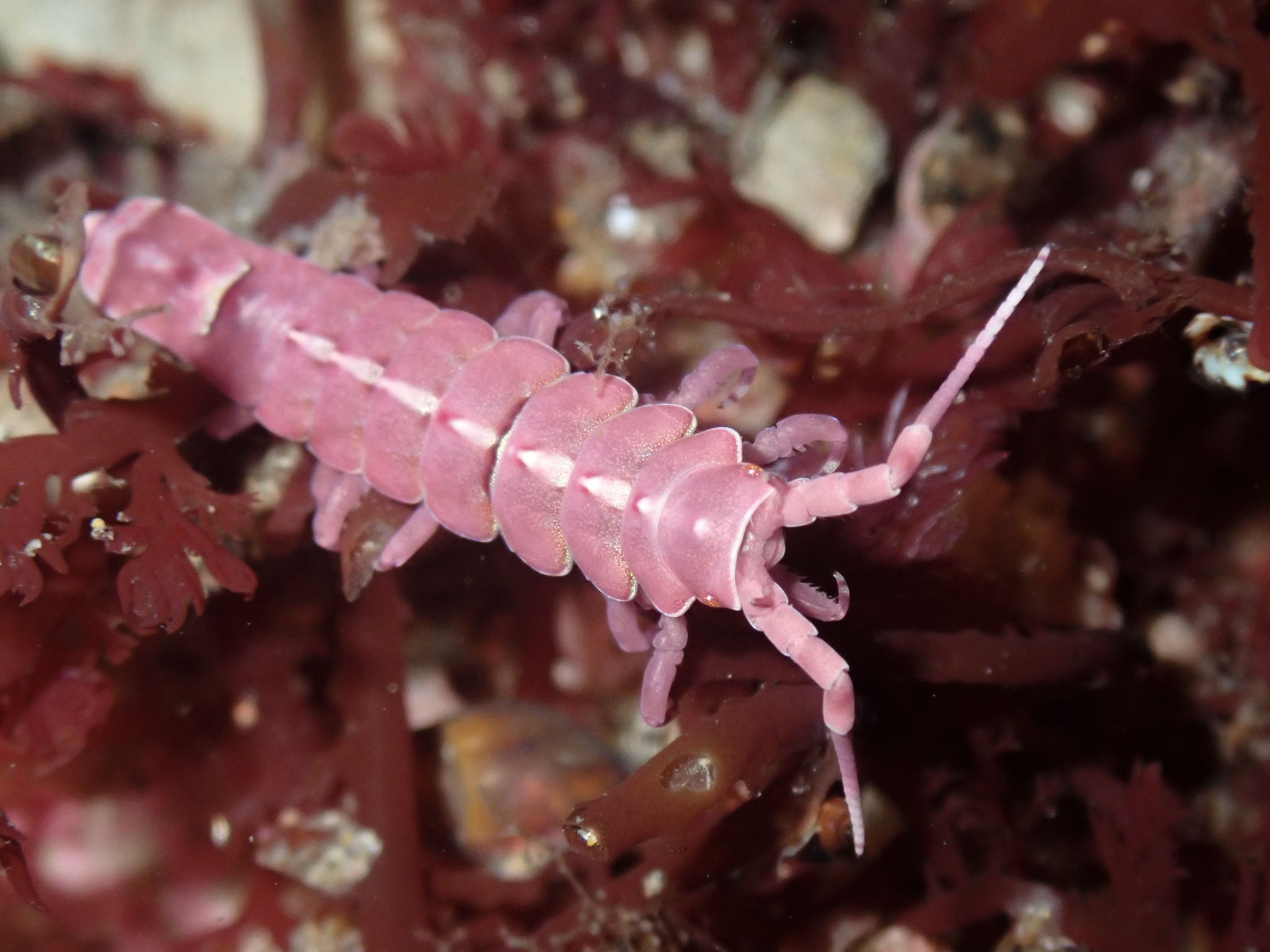

Scientific classification
- Kingdom: Animalia
- Phylum: Arthropoda
- Class: Malacostraca
- Order: Isopoda
- Family: Idoteidae
- Genus: Pentidotea
- Species: P. aculeata

Binomial name
- Pentidotea aculeata Stafford, 1913

= Pentidotea aculeata =

Species of crustacean

Pentidotea aculeata is a species of isopod in the family Idoteidae. It lives in the intertidal region along the coast of California.
