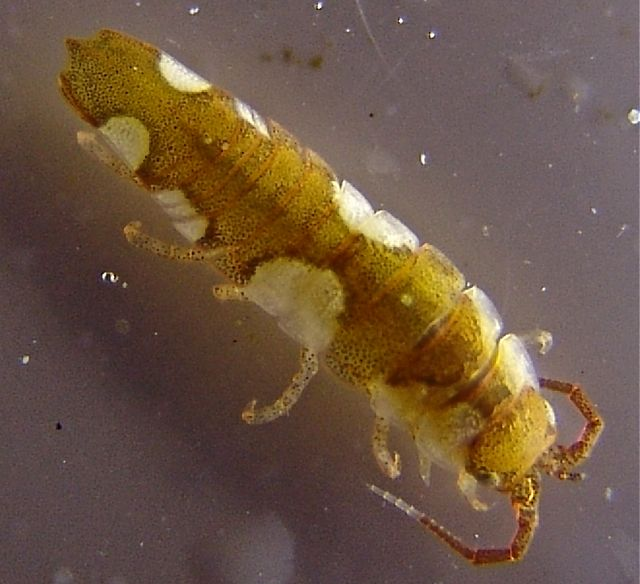
- Idotea balthica

Scientific classification
- Kingdom: Animalia
- Phylum: Arthropoda
- Class: Malacostraca
- Order: Isopoda
- Family: Idoteidae
- Genus: Idotea; Fabricius, 1798

Type species
- Cymothoa emarginata Fabricius, 1793

= Idotea =

Genus of crustaceans

Idotea is a genus of isopod crustaceans, mostly from cold temperate waters. The taxonomy of the genus is still in doubt, and many of the currently recognised species may be taxonomic synonyms, and others may be moved to different genera.

== Species ==
The genus Idotea includes the following species:

- Idotea aleutica Gurjanova, 1933
- Idotea balthica (Pallas, 1772)
- Idotea brevicauda Dana, 1853
- Idotea brevicorna Milne-Edwards, 1840
- Idotea chelipes (Pallas, 1766)
- Idotea danai Miers, 1881
- Idotea delfini Porter, 1903
- Idotea emarginata (Fabricius, 1793)
- Idotea fewkesi Richardson, 1905
- Idotea granulosa Rathke, 1843
- Idotea gurjanovae Kussakin, 1974
- Idotea indica Milne-Edwards, 1840
- Idotea linearis (Linnaeus, 1766)
- Idotea metallica Bosc, 1802
- Idotea neglecta Sars, 1897
- Idotea obscura Rafi, 1972
- Idotea ochotensis Brandt, 1851
- Idotea orientalis Gurjanova, 1933
- Idotea ostroumovi Sowinsky, 1895
- Idotea pelagica Leach, 1815
- Idotea phosphorea Harger, 1873
- Idotea rufescens Fee, 1926
- Idotea spasskii Gurjanova, 1950
- Idotea urotoma Stimpson, 1864
- Idotea whymperi Miers, 1881
- Idotea ziczac Barnard, 1951

== See also ==
- Pentidotea wosnesenskii
