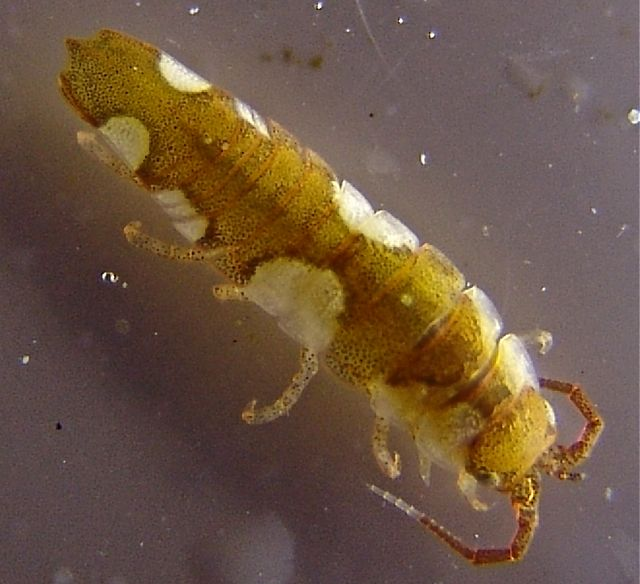

Scientific classification
- Kingdom: Animalia
- Phylum: Arthropoda
- Clade: Pancrustacea
- Class: Malacostraca
- Order: Isopoda
- Family: Idoteidae
- Genus: Idotea
- Species: I. balthica

Binomial name
- Idotea balthica (Pallas, 1772)

Synonyms
- Idotea pusilla Eichwald, 1842; Idotea balthica stagnea Tinturier-Hamelin, 1960; Idotea baltica Pallas, 1772 [orth. error]; Idotea basteri Audouin, 1826; Idotea sarsi Collinge, 1917; Idotea tricuspidata Desmarest, 1825; Idotea tridentata Latreille, 1806; Idotea variegata Roux, 1830; Oniscus balthica Pallas, 1772; Oniscus tridens Scopoli, 1763; Stenosoma irrorata Say, 1818

= Idotea balthica =

Species of crustacean

Idotea balthica, also known as the Baltic isopod and the smooth seaweed isopod, is a species of marine isopod which lives on seaweed and seagrass in the subtidal zone of rocky shores and sandy lagoons.

== Distribution ==
Idotea balthica has a broad geographical distribution, having been recorded from the Belgian Exclusive Economic Zone, the British Isles, Cobscook Bay, Dutch Exclusive Economic Zone, European waters, Greek Exclusive Economic Zone, Gulf of Maine, Knokke, North West Atlantic, Red Sea, Voordelta, West Coast of Norway, Wimereux and the Black Sea.

== Appearance ==
The male is larger than female, and can reach 4 centimetres (1.6 in) long, while the female reaches a maximum length of around 1.8 cm. The male has most likely evolved to be larger than the female on average because larger size is more vital for the reproductive success of the male compared to the female.

The color of the body is extremely variable, ranging from muted greens to striking black-and-silver patternings; the female is usually darker. The males are frequently colored a light green. Color intensity is variable and can be altered through the restriction and dilation of chromatophores. Males and females display different coloration (sexual dimorphism) due to selection for different behaviors in the two sexes. Researchers also believe that the primary cause of selection for this color polymorphism within localized populations is predation (from carnivorous fish, crabs) in conjunction with gene flow and varying microhabitats. The color polymorphism allows for the isopod to display cryptic coloration in multiple microhabitats.

The species can be distinguished from other idoteids by the shape of the telson, which is dorsally keeled with straight sides in I. balthica, and has a distinct protrusion at the end.

== Foraging ==
Adults are potentially omnivorous, but mainly feed on different types of vegetation. In the Baltic, these include brown algae (Fucus spp., Elachista fucicola, Pylaiella littoralis), green algae (Cladophora glomerata, Ulva spp.), and Phanerogams (Stuckenia pectinata, Ruppia spp., Zostera marina).

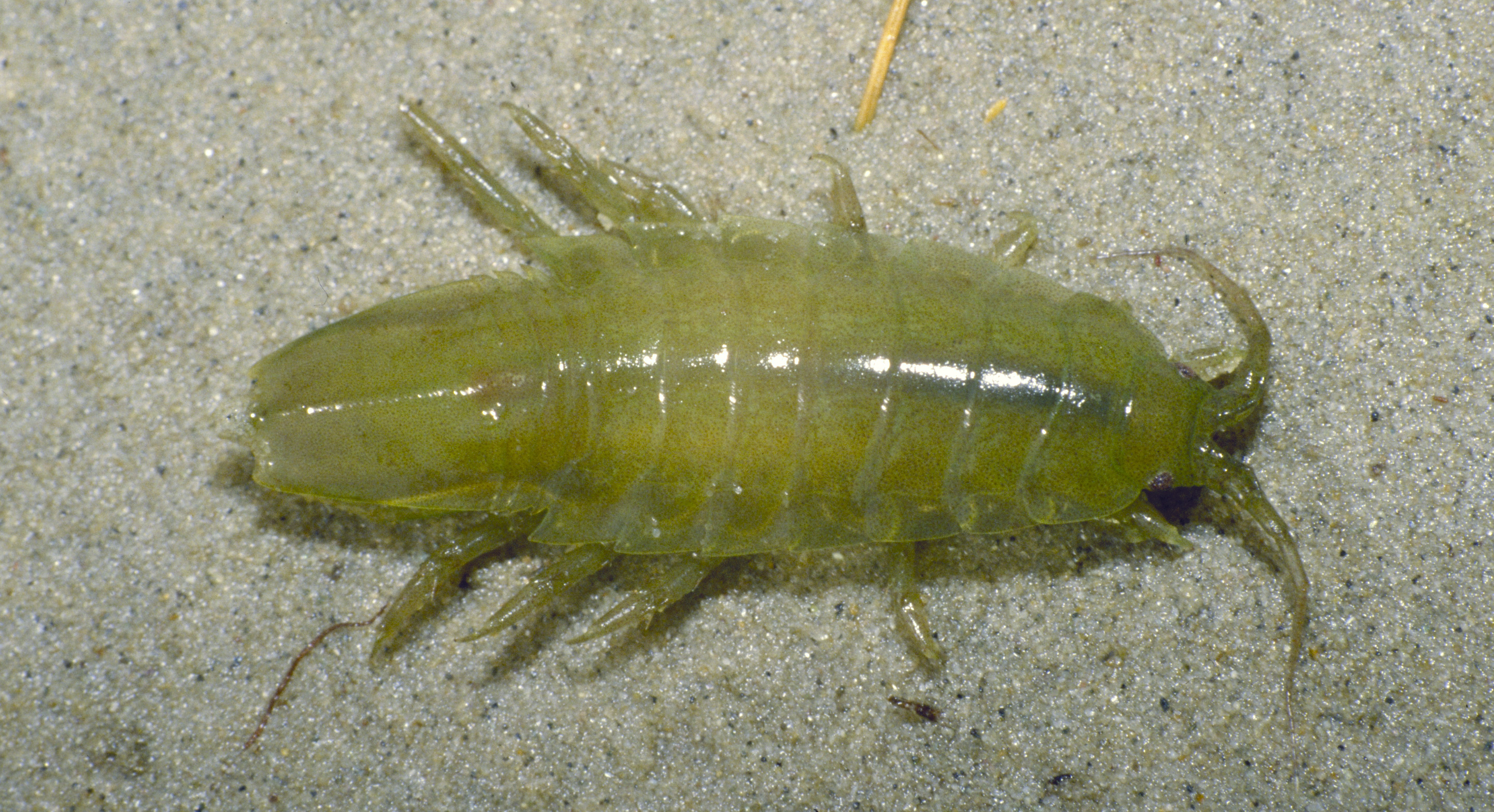

In the Baltic, I. balthica prefers Fucus vesiculosus, an algal seaweed, as host plant over other algae and vascular plants. The apical and basal parts of F. vesiculosus differ as food and as shelter, and males grow faster when fed with the apical parts, but females grow equally well with both.

== As a pollinator ==
In 2022, I. balthica was discovered to help Gracilaria gracilis reproduce – the first known case of an animal helping algae reproduce.

== Habitat selection ==
The isopod selects their habitat based on a trade-off between limiting predator risk and maximizing food intake. These benefits and costs are evaluated differently between sexes, therefore there is a difference in the microhabitat selection between sexes. Additionally, there are temporal variations in microhabitat selection. During the day, both sexes of the isopod generally are less active in their search for food than at night and favor concealing habitats to limit the risk of detection by a predator. This bias for a more concealing habitat and lower levels of activity becomes stronger when there is a higher risk of predation. On the other hand, the isopods migrate more between microhabitats, to find food or mates, when they are concealed by night.

Microhabitat choice is also impacted by the life stage of the organism, with the microhabitat selection of an adult being more heavily influenced by predator avoidance than that of a juvenile. However, microhabitat selection is not dependent on the color morph of the organism. Conversely, varying microhabitat preferences between different colorations of this isopod produce differing levels of predation that select for a color polymorphism.

Finally, their habitat selection is influenced by interspecific competition where the more dominant species will often outcompete the less dominant species in shared habitats and subsequently restrict the microhabitat choices of the less dominant species. This effect is displayed in a study of the competition between Idotea balthica and Idotea emarginata in shared environments. Idotea balthica appears to have to settle for migrating between suboptimal habitats while Idotea emarginata (the more dominant species) are able to settle permanently in habitats with better resources.

=== Sex difference in microhabitat selection ===
The tradeoff between finding a place to hide from predators and finding food sources is impacted by the sex of the organism. Therefore there is a difference in microhabitat selection due to sex. Some researchers propose that this sex difference in microhabitat selection is due to differential reproductive behaviors. Researchers have found that males tend to move between microhabitats more often than females and are more inclined to be reckless in regards to predation risks. Researchers believe that males display more recklessness than females because their reproductive success is more dependent on size than females, and therefore foraging contributes more to the fitness of the males.

== Mating behaviors and conflicts ==
Generally, males are viewed as the more active party during mating. During mating season, males engage in male to male competition to secure a mate. Not much is known about the mechanism of male-male competition, but sexual selection favors large appendages in males like larger secondary antennae. Presumably these features confer an advantage in male-male competition.

Once the males have secured a mate, they will attempt to initiate pre-copulatory mate guarding to limit other males' access to the mated female. These pre-copulatory pairs are often initiated around a week before parturial ecdysis because the male wants to monopolize copulations of the female. If a pre-copulatory pair is formed, the male will carry the female around on its back until it undergoes moulting in two phases (anterior/posterior) and becomes receptive.

Other males will sometimes attempt to take over a mating pair if it is larger than the paired male. This form of intrasexual competition is part of the reason why paired males tend to be larger on average than solitary males.

=== Mate choice ===
Males display a preference for size, or a quality connected to size, in females. Researchers believe this male preference for size is due to the larger reproductive output correlated with larger females of the species. However, this male preference is hard to exert in the wild since males often can't compare the sizes of females. Additionally, at the beginning of the breeding season, the operational sex ratio is male-biased (there are more sexually competing males than females) which causes the male to not display a size bias. Although, female maturity is believed to be an even more important criteria for male selection and sexual conflict may be a product of males trying to assess the maturation stage of a female.

On the other hand, female resistance to mate guarding attempts is a way for females to engage in female mate choice. Female resistance is a mechanism of selecting for larger sizes (or other phenotypic traits) in males because males with certain phenotypes are more effective in preserving pre-copulatory pairs, and therefore have a higher fitness. Female resistance also selects for additional aggressiveness in males. Certain phenotypes are also selected for in males by enabling them to be more successful at male-male competition.

=== Sexual conflict ===
Idotea balthica have a long pre-copulatory phase where the male will attempt to begin mate guarding well before the parturial ecdysis of the female. Females may not comply with a mate guarding attempt because the female may not prefer the male attempting to mate guard, or because the cost of mate guarding at this point in the female's maturation cycle outweighs the benefits for the female. Such costs can include a decrease in food resources, a loss of a microhabitat, and/or an increased risk of predation. On the other hand, the struggles before pre-copulatory pair formation and mate guarding can also result in females incurring fitness costs in the form of decreased fecundity and stored energy compounds.

Female resistance to mate guarding typically consists of the female writhing strongly to throw off the male. If that mechanisms fails, then the female may bend their body ventrally into a round configuration to make it difficult for the male to remain situated on top of them. Males may kick back in response to these resistance measures. Either this leads to the male being kicked off, the female escaping, or, if the female is close to parturial ecdysis and the male perseveres through the resistances, a pre-copulatory mating pair formation. Evidence has shown that the resolution of this conflict is frequently decided more by the female interest.

The outcome of this conflict is dictated by the level of aggressiveness displayed by the male and female. The level of aggressiveness displayed by both sexes is dependent on the benefits of a pre-copulatory pair compared to the costs of engaging in pre-copulatory mate guarding at a specific stage in the female's reproductive cycle. The net result of engaging in a pair varies by population based on factors such as the operational sex ratio and the synchrony of reproduction. The level of aggressiveness is also dependent on other characteristics, such as degree of size dimorphism, which influence the likelihood of winning the conflict. Females have been found to display more resistance, and apply certain resistance maneuvers more frequently, when there is less size dimorphism in the population because the males are not as large and there is a lower of cost of resistance for the female and a greater chance for success.
