= Idotea linearis =

Scientific classification
- Kingdom: Animalia
- Phylum: Arthropoda
- Class: Malacostraca
- Order: Isopoda
- Family: Idoteidae
- Genus: Idotea
- Species: I. linearis

Binomial name
- Idotea linearis (Linnaeus, 1763)

Synonyms
- Oniscus linearis Linnaeus, 1763; Stenosoma lineare Leach, 1815; Idothea sexlineata Krøyer, 1846

Species of crustacean

Idotea linearis is a species of elongated isopod crustacean.

== Description ==
Idotea linearis is a narrow organism, up to seven times longer than wide. Males tend to be larger than females, and can reach 40 millimetres (1.6 in) in length.

== Distribution and ecology ==
The distribution of Idotea linearis extends from the North Sea south to Morocco and the Mediterranean Sea. It lives below the littoral zone, and can often be seen swimming near sandy shores at low tide.
