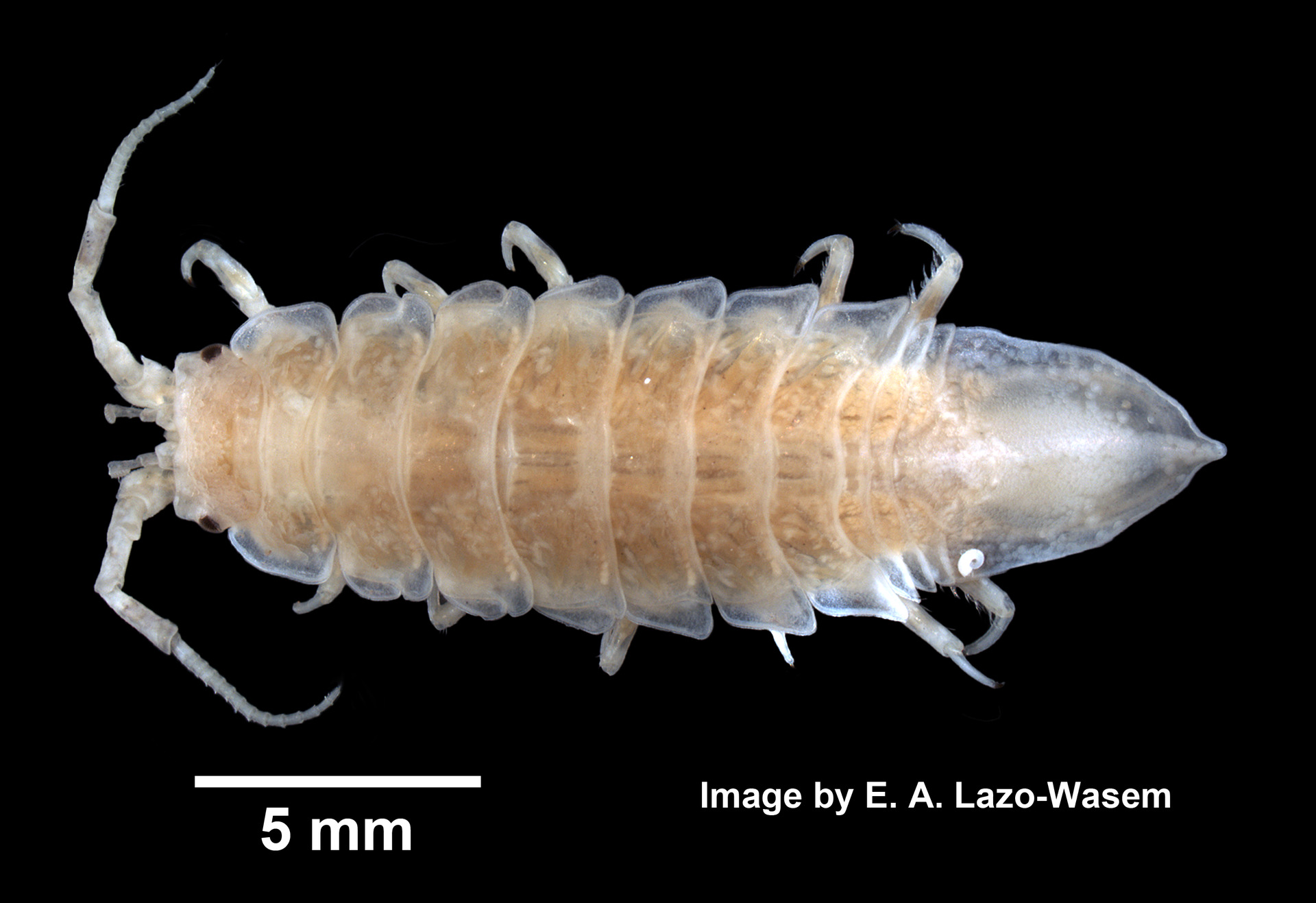

Scientific classification
- Kingdom: Animalia
- Phylum: Arthropoda
- Class: Malacostraca
- Order: Isopoda
- Family: Idoteidae
- Genus: Idotea
- Species: I. phosphorea

Binomial name
- Idotea phosphorea Harger, 1873

= Idotea phosphorea =

Species of crustacean

Idotea phosphorea is a species of isopod in the family Idoteidae. It is found along the Atlantic coast of North America.
