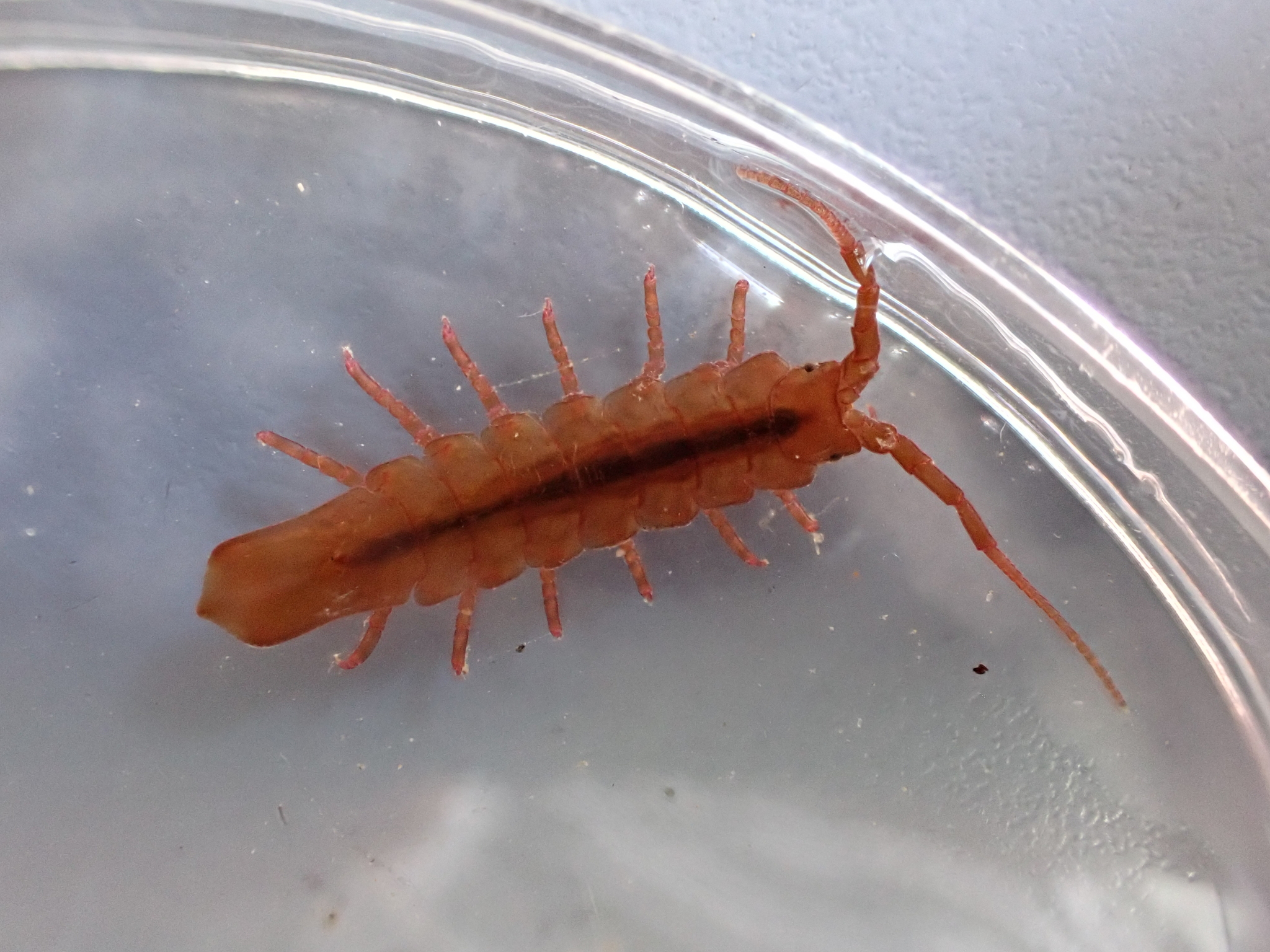
- Specimen found at New Plymouth

Scientific classification
- Kingdom: Animalia
- Phylum: Arthropoda
- Clade: Pancrustacea
- Class: Malacostraca
- Order: Isopoda
- Family: Idoteidae
- Genus: Euidotea
- Species: E. durvillei

Binomial name
- Euidotea durvillei Poore & Lew Ton, 1993

= Euidotea durvillei =

Species of crustacean

Euidotea durvillei, known commonly as the red seaweed isopod, is a species of marine isopod found in New Zealand.

== Description ==
Adults reach 30 millimetres (1.2 in) in length. Body is red with a lightly coloured stripe down its back. The leading edge of each segment on the exoskeleton is curved towards its head. The tail section curves outwards.

== Habitat ==
Euidotea durvillei is found on red seaweeds in the low to shallow subtidal regions of the intertidal zone of rocky shores.

== Behaviour & diet ==
The red seaweed isopod is a nocturnal grazer feeder, feeding on red seaweed. It camouflages itself against the red seaweed on which it also lives.

== Gallery ==
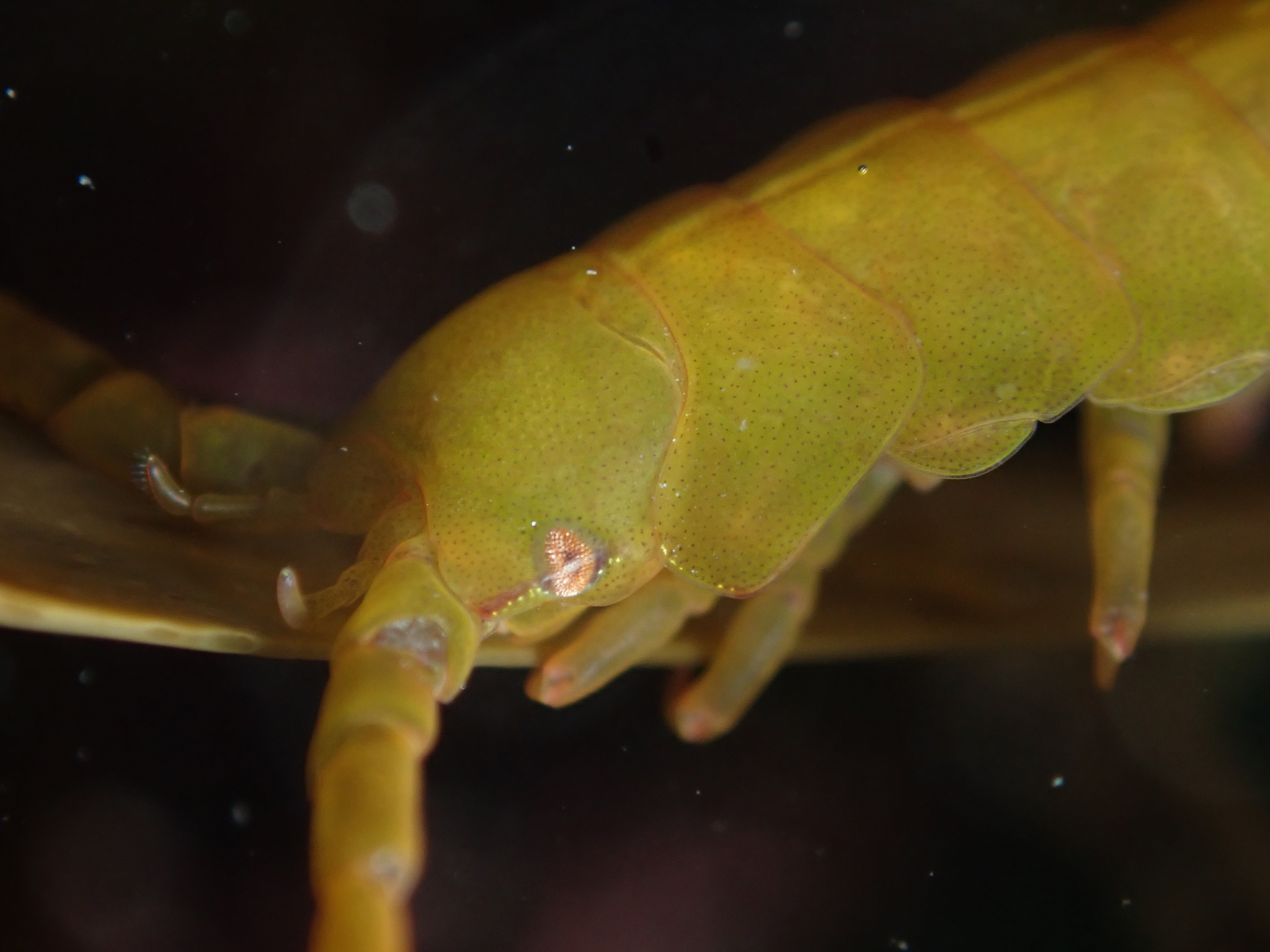
Close-up of Euidotea durvillei

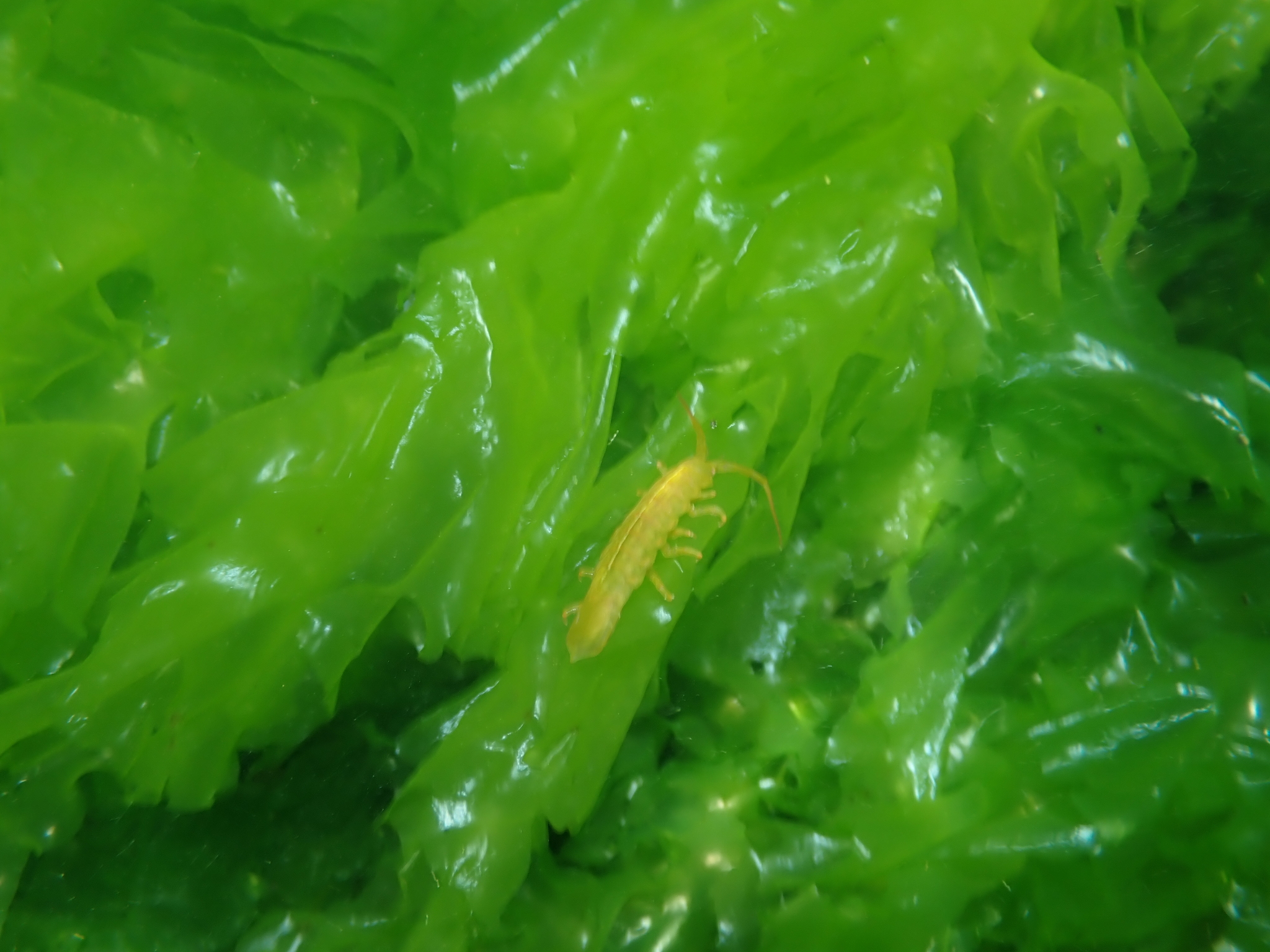
Euidotea durvillei on seaweed
