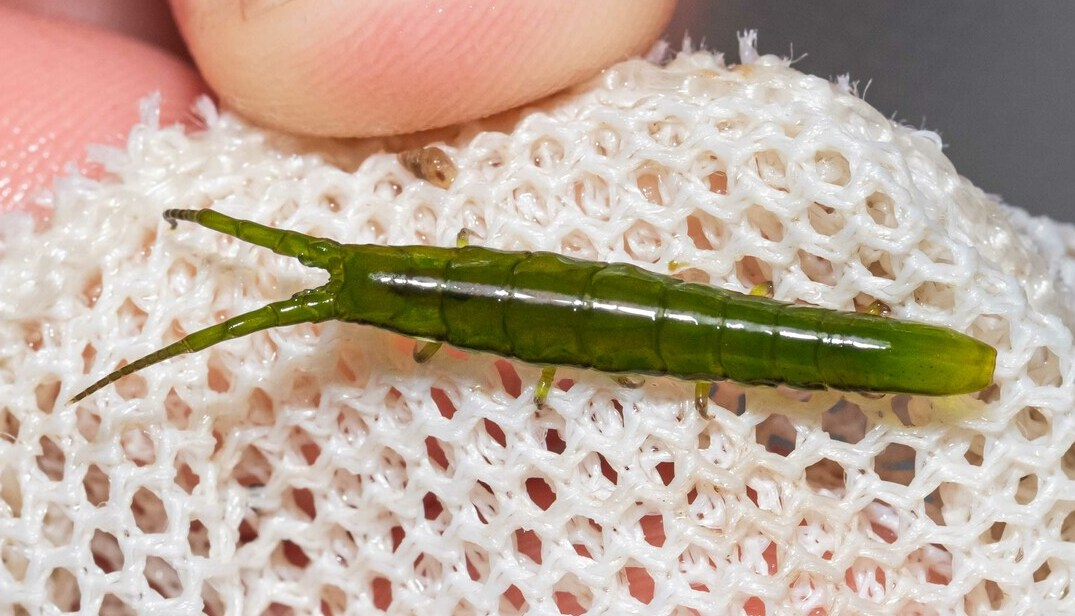

Scientific classification
- Kingdom: Animalia
- Phylum: Arthropoda
- Class: Malacostraca
- Order: Isopoda
- Family: Idoteidae
- Genus: Pentidotea
- Species: P. kirchanskii

Binomial name
- Pentidotea kirchanskii (Miller & Lee, 1970)

= Pentidotea kirchanskii =

Species of crustacean

Pentidotea kirchanskii is species of isopod in the family Idoteidae. It was first described by Miller & Lee in 1970.

== Distribution and habitat ==
Pentidotea kirchanskii is found along the coast of California and Oregon in the Northern Pacific, and is most common between San Jose and San Diego. It lives in the intertidal, and is commonly found clinging to surfgrass.
