= Tegorhynchus =

Scientific classification
- Domain: Eukaryota
- Kingdom: Animalia
- Phylum: Rotifera
- Class: Palaeacanthocephala
- Order: Echinorhynchida
- Family: Illiosentidae
- Genus: Tegorhynchus; Van Cleave, 1921

Genus of thorny-headed worms

Tegorhynchus is a genus of worms belonging to the family Illiosentidae.

The species of this genus are found in Northern America.

Species:

- Tegorhynchus africanus (Golvan, 1955)
- Tegorhynchus africanus (Van Cleave & Lincicome, 1939) Amin, 1985
- Tegorhynchus brevis Van Cleave, 1921
- Tegorhynchus cetratus (Van Cleave, 1945)
- Tegorhynchus edmondsi (Golvan, 1960)
- Tegorhynchus furcatus (Van Cleave & Lincicome, 1939)
- Tegorhynchus holospinosus Amin & Sey, 1996
- Tegorhynchus holospinus Amin & Sey, 1996
- Tegorhynchus multacanthus (Mamaev, 1970)
