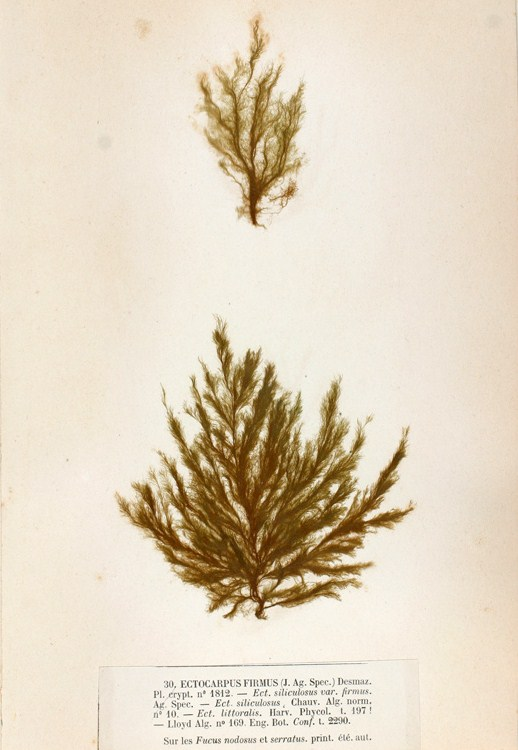
- Pylaiella littoralis

Scientific classification
- Domain: Eukaryota
- Clade: Sar
- Clade: Stramenopiles
- Division: Ochrophyta
- Class: Phaeophyceae
- Order: Ectocarpales
- Family: Acinetosporaceae
- Genus: Pylaiella; Bory

= Pylaiella =

Genus of seaweeds

Pylaiella (mung) is a genus of seaweed (brown algae) that can be a nuisance due to its ability to coat people, ropes, animals, and more when it blooms close to the shore under particular conditions.

== Species ==
The genus includes the following species:

- Pylaiella aquitanica Ruprecht, 1850
- Pylaiella gardneri Collins, 1912
- Pylaiella hooperi De Toni, 1895
- Pylaiella littoralis (Linnaeus) Kjellman, 1872
- Pylaiella nana Kjellman, 1883
- Pylaiella penicilliformis Kjellman, 1906
- Pylaiella petaloniae Noda, 1975
- Pylaiella seriata Kuckuck, 2007
- Pylaiella tenella Setchell & N.L. Gardner, 1922
- Pylaiella unilateralis Setchell & N.L. Gardner, 1922
- Pylaiella varia Kjellman, 1883
- Pylaiella washingtoniensis C.C. Jao, 1937
