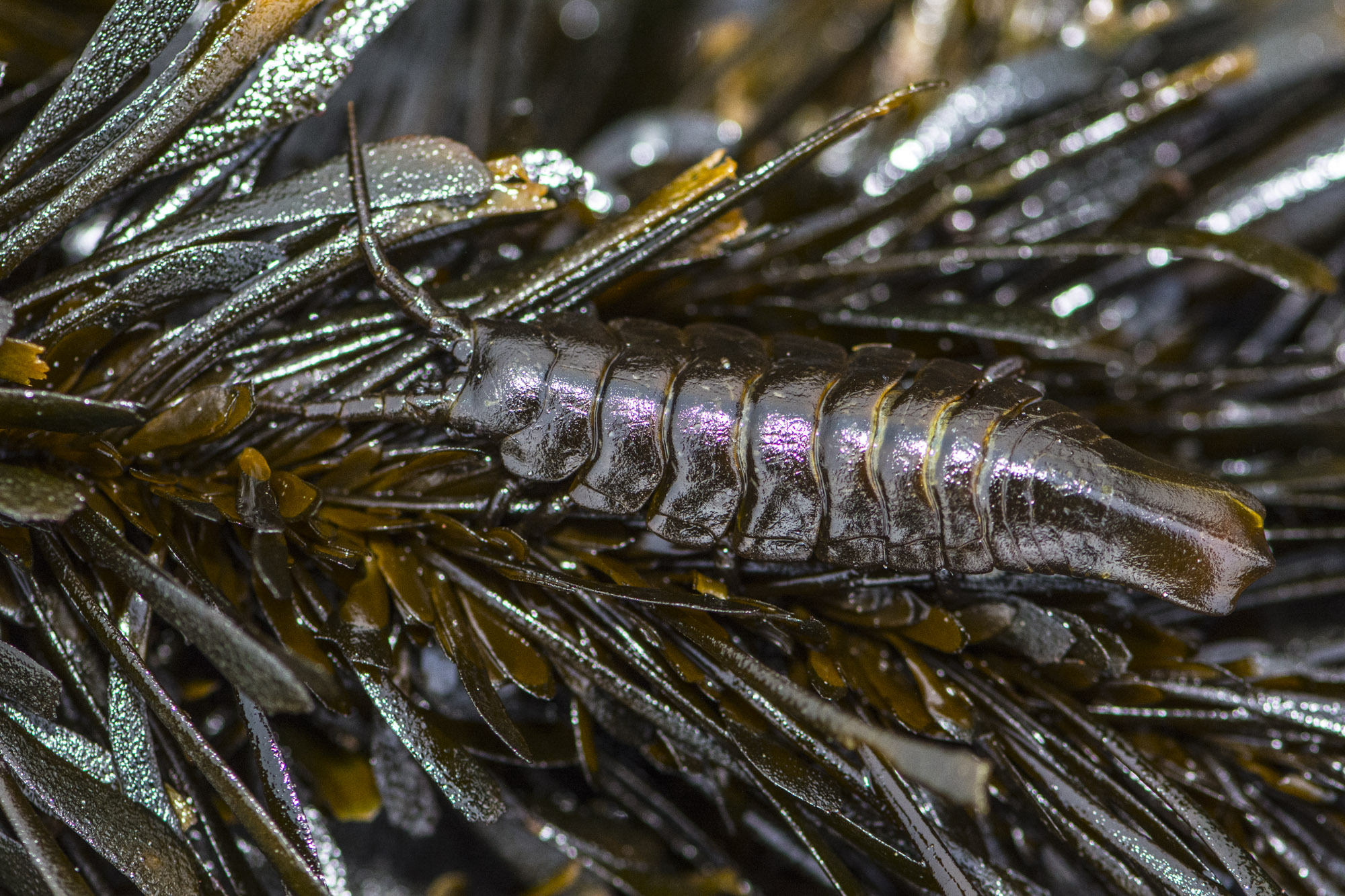

Scientific classification
- Kingdom: Animalia
- Phylum: Arthropoda
- Class: Malacostraca
- Order: Isopoda
- Family: Idoteidae
- Genus: Pentidotea; H. Richardson, 1905

= Pentidotea =

Genus of crustaceans

Pentidotea is a genus of isopods in the family Idoteidae. There are about 13 described species in Pentidotea.

== Species ==
These 13 species belong to the genus Pentidotea:

- Pentidotea aculeata Stafford, 1913
- Pentidotea australis Hale, 1924
- Pentidotea gracillima (Dana, 1854)
- Pentidotea kirchanskii (M. A. Miller & Lee, 1970)
- Pentidotea montereyensis (Maloney, 1933)
- Pentidotea panousei Daguerre de Hureaux, 1968
- Pentidotea recta Rafi & Laubitz, 1990
- Pentidotea resecata (Stimpson, 1857) (eelgrass isopod)
- Pentidotea rotundata H. Richardson, 1909
- Pentidotea schmitti (Menzies, 1950)
- Pentidotea stenops (J. E. Benedict, 1898)
- Pentidotea whitei (Stimpson, 1864)
- Pentidotea wosnesenskii (Brandt, 1851) (rockweed isopod)
