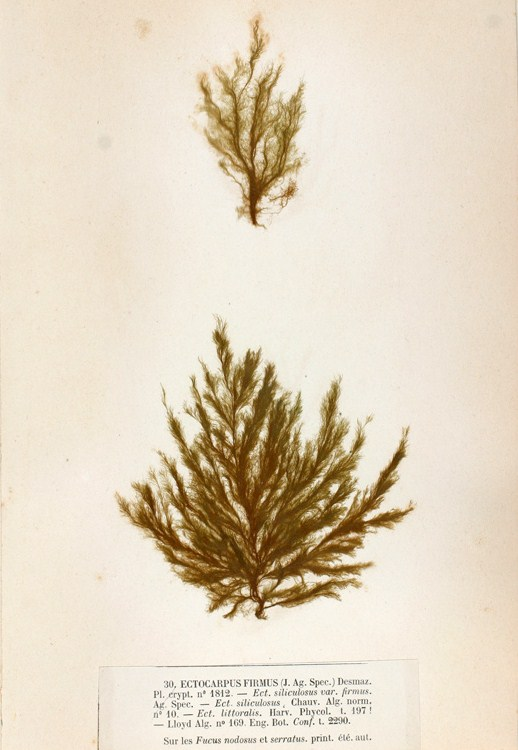

Scientific classification
- Domain: Eukaryota
- Clade: Sar
- Clade: Stramenopiles
- Division: Ochrophyta
- Class: Phaeophyceae
- Order: Ectocarpales
- Family: Acinetosporaceae
- Genus: Pylaiella
- Species: P. littoralis

Binomial name
- Pylaiella littoralis (Linnaeus) Kjellman, 1872

= Pylaiella littoralis =

Species of seaweed

Pylaiella littoralis, (common name: sea felt) is a species of alga belonging to the family Acinetosporaceae.It grows in an opposite branching pattern, with each branch growing to roughly 5 cm long.

Synonym:

- Conferva littoralis Linnaeus (= basionym)
- Pilayella littoralis
