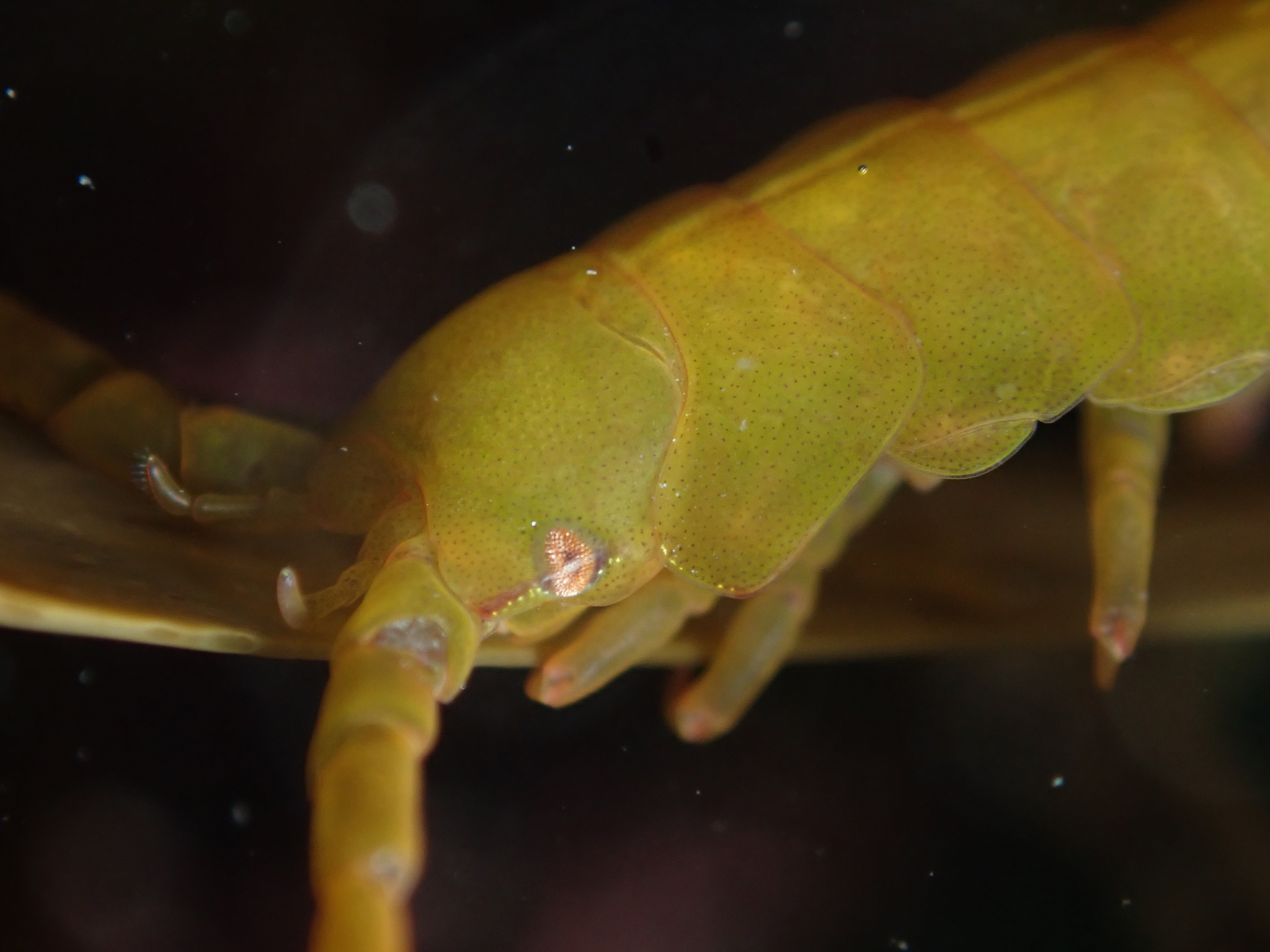
- Euidotea durvillei

Scientific classification
- Kingdom: Animalia
- Phylum: Arthropoda
- Class: Malacostraca
- Order: Isopoda
- Family: Idoteidae
- Genus: Euidotea; Collinge, 1917

Type species
- Idotea peronii Milne Edwards, 1840

= Euidotea =

Genus of crustaceans

Euidotea is a genus of marine isopods belonging to the family Idoteidae. The species of this genus are found in Australia and New Zealand.

== Species ==
There are seven species:

- Euidotea bakeri (Collinge, 1917)
- Euidotea caeruleotincta Hale, 1927
- Euidotea danai Poore & Lew Ton, 1993
- Euidotea durvillei Poore & Lew Ton, 1993
- Euidotea halei Poore & Lew Ton, 1993
- Euidotea peronii (Milne Edwards, 1840)
- Euidotea stricta (Dana, 1853)
