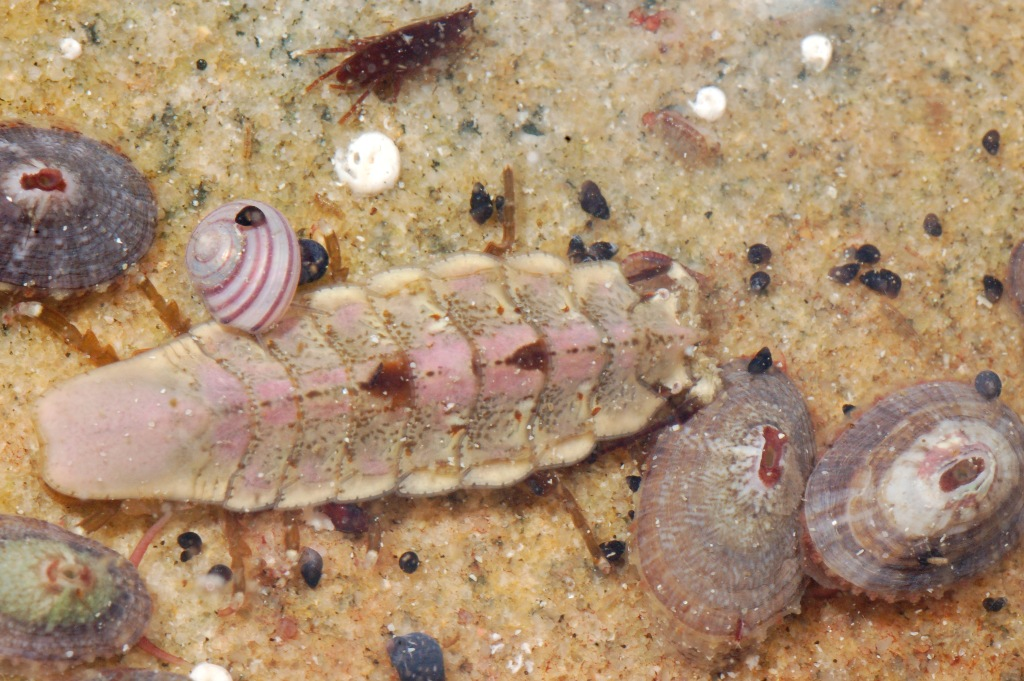

Scientific classification
- Kingdom: Animalia
- Phylum: Arthropoda
- Clade: Pancrustacea
- Class: Malacostraca
- Order: Isopoda
- Family: Idoteidae
- Genus: Glyptidotea; Stebbing, 1902
- Species: G. lichtensteini

Binomial name
- Glyptidotea lichtensteini Krauss, 1843

Synonyms
- Idotea lichtensteini Krauss, 1843

= Glyptidotea =

Species of crustacean

Glyptidotea is a monotypic genus of isopod in the family Idoteidae. Its sole member is Glyptidotea lichtensteini, the keeled isopod, a medium-sized isopod found on the coast of southern Africa.

== Description ==
The species has an elongate body with nearly parallel flanks. It bears a pattern of brown or pink blotches that serve as camouflage. A pronounced rostrum or spike extends from the front of the head and runs backwards over the center of the back in the form of a keel. The segments of the pleon are fused to the telson. Average size is 40 mm.

== Distribution and habitat ==
Glyptidotea lichtensteini occurs from the coast of southern Namibia at Lüderitz to the Transkei in South Africa. It inhabits the intertidal zone, where it may be found under boulders. It has also been reported from seamounts and knolls.
