= Pseudorhadinorhynchus =

Scientific classification
- Kingdom: Animalia
- Phylum: Acanthocephala
- Class: Palaeacanthocephala
- Order: Echinorhynchida
- Family: Illiosentidae
- Genus: Pseudorhadinorhynchus; Achmerov & Dombrovskaja-Achmerova, 1941

Genus of worms

Pseudorhadinorhynchus is a genus of parasitic worms belonging to the family Illiosentidae.

Species:

- Pseudorhadinorhynchus cinereus Gupta & Naqvi, 1983
- Pseudorhadinorhynchus deeghai Saxena, 2003
- Pseudorhadinorhynchus dhari Kumar, 1992
- Pseudorhadinorhynchus dussamicitatum Gupta & Gupta, 1972
- Pseudorhadinorhynchus dussumieri Gupta & Gupta, 1972
- Pseudorhadinorhynchus ernakulensis Gupta & Gupta, 1972
- Pseudorhadinorhynchus guptai Gupta & Sinha, 1993
- Pseudorhadinorhynchus leuciscus (Krotov & Petrochenko, 1956) Golvan, 1969
- Pseudorhadinorhynchus longicollum Gupts & Naqvi, 1986
- Pseudorhadinorhynchus machidai Kumar, 1992
- Pseudorhadinorhynchus markewitschi Akhmerov & Dombrovskaja-Akhmerova, 1941
- Pseudorhadinorhynchus mnobi Gupta & Naqvi, 1986
- Pseudorhadinorhynchus nandai Gupta & Sinha, 1993
- Pseudorhadinorhynchus orissai Gupta & Fatma, 1985
- Pseudorhadinorhynchus pseudaspii Akhmerov & Dombrovskaja-Akhmerova, 1941
- Pseudorhadinorhynchus salmothymi Rukavina & Goric in Cankovic, Delic, Kiškarolj & Rukavina, 1968
- Pseudorhadinorhynchus samegaiensis Nakajima & Egusa, 1975
- Pseudorhadinorhynchus srivastavai Gupta & Fatma, 1985
- Pseudorhadinorhynchus vietnamensis Moravec & Sey, 1989
