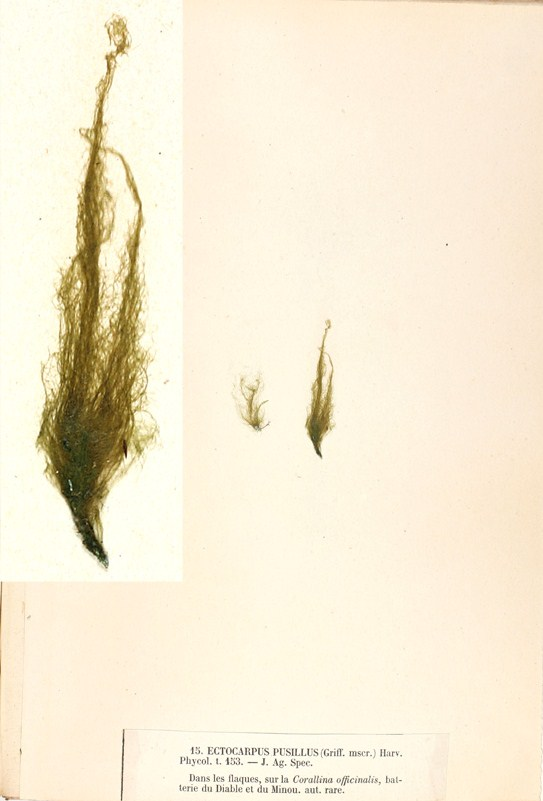
- Acinetospora crinita

Scientific classification
- Domain: Eukaryota
- Clade: Diaphoretickes
- Clade: SAR
- Clade: Stramenopiles
- Phylum: Gyrista
- Subphylum: Ochrophytina
- Class: Phaeophyceae
- Order: Ectocarpales
- Family: Acinetosporaceae
- Genus: Acinetospora; Bornet, 1891

Species
- See text

= Acinetospora =

Genus of seaweeds

Acinetospora is a genus of brown algae in the family Acinetosporaceae.

== Species ==
Algaebase lists the following species:

- Acinetospora asiatica Yaegashi, Yamagishi & Kogame
- Acinetospora crinita (Carmichael) Sauvageau
- Acinetospora filamentosa (Noda) Yaegashi, Uwai & Kogame
- Acinetospora nicholsoniae Hollenberg
