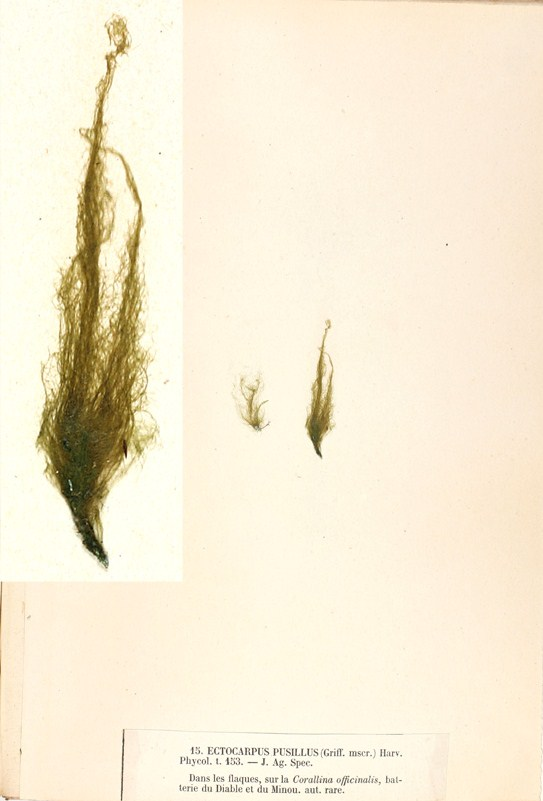

Scientific classification
- Domain: Eukaryota
- Clade: Diaphoretickes
- Clade: SAR
- Clade: Stramenopiles
- Phylum: Gyrista
- Subphylum: Ochrophytina
- Class: Phaeophyceae
- Order: Ectocarpales
- Family: Acinetosporaceae
- Genus: Acinetospora
- Species: A. crinita

Binomial name
- Acinetospora crinita (Carmichael) Sauvageau 1899

Synonyms
- Ectocarpus crinitus Carmichael 1833; Ectocarpus pusillus Harvey 1841; Ectocarpus vidovichii Meneghini ex Zanardini 1843; Haplospora vidovichii (Meneghini) Bornet 1891; Acinetospora pusilla (A.W.Griffiths ex Harvey) De Toni 1895; Acinetospora vidovichii (Meneghini) Sauvageau 1898

= Acinetospora crinita =

Species of brown algae

Acinetospora crinita is a species of brown alga in the family Acinetosporaceae. It is found in the temperate northeastern Atlantic Ocean and the Mediterranean Sea.

== Description ==
Acinetospora crinita forms slender, irregularly branched filaments some 25 to 35 μm in diameter. These consist of strands of cells, each up to three times longer than they are broad, of a pale brown or yellowish-brown colour. Each cell contains several disc-shaped chloroplasts and a pyrenoid. The tips of the filaments are rounded; the filaments are often tangled with other algae forming bushy tufts which can grow to a length of several metres. This alga can be distinguished from other similar species by the branches growing perpendicularly from the filaments, and often emerging from the middle of a cell.

== Distribution and habitat ==
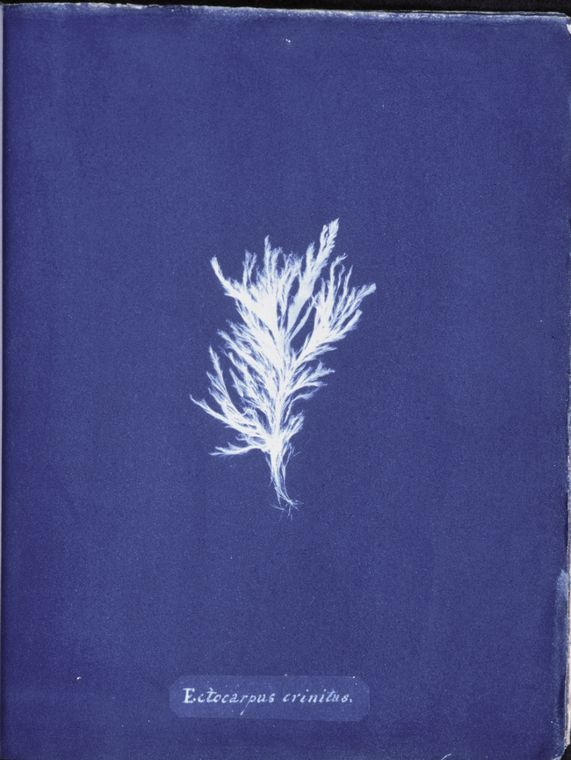
Acinetospora crinita = Ectocarpus crinitus

Acinetospora crinita occurs in the temperate northeastern Atlantic Ocean and the Mediterranean Sea. It is also considered to be part of a cosmopolitan species complex, being reported from Bermuda, the Caribbean Sea, the Pacific Ocean and elsewhere, and has been described as "enigmatic". Where it does grow, it sometimes consists of fragments of as many as thirty different species intermingled, with the different strains thriving in varying conditions and at different times of year. It forms a more or less complete covering of filamentous algae over the rock, detritus, living animals and sea grasses on the seabed in its habitat; its depth range is 5 to 40 m (16 to 131 ft).

== Biology ==
Like other brown algae, Acinetospora crinita uses chlorophyll, fucoxanthin and other pigments to fix carbon dioxide by photosynthesis. The reproductive system is very complex and has not been fully elucidated; the method used can vary with the region, the time of year and the population concerned. Several stages are involved and at least five reproductive structures have been identified. The sporangia (reproductive organs) are inserted perpendicularly to the filaments. The alga can also reproduce asexually by fragmentation.

Acinetospora crinita and other filamentous algae grow vigorously in spring and summer, covering the seabed and tending to swamp other organisms, reducing their ability to filter feed and sometimes killing them. The algae thrive with warm weather, calm seas and high levels of nutrients in the water. They are eaten by herbivorous fish, but grow at a faster rate than they can be consumed.
