= Internoretia =

Scientific classification
- Domain: Eukaryota
- Clade: Sar
- Clade: Stramenopiles
- Division: Ochrophyta
- Class: Phaeophyceae
- Order: Ectocarpales
- Family: Acinetosporaceae
- Genus: Internoretia; Setchell & N.L.Gardner, 1920

Type species
- Internoretia fryeana Setchell & N.L.Gardner

Species
- Internoretia fryeana

Genus of seaweeds

Internoretia is a genus of brown algae in the family Acinetosporaceae.
