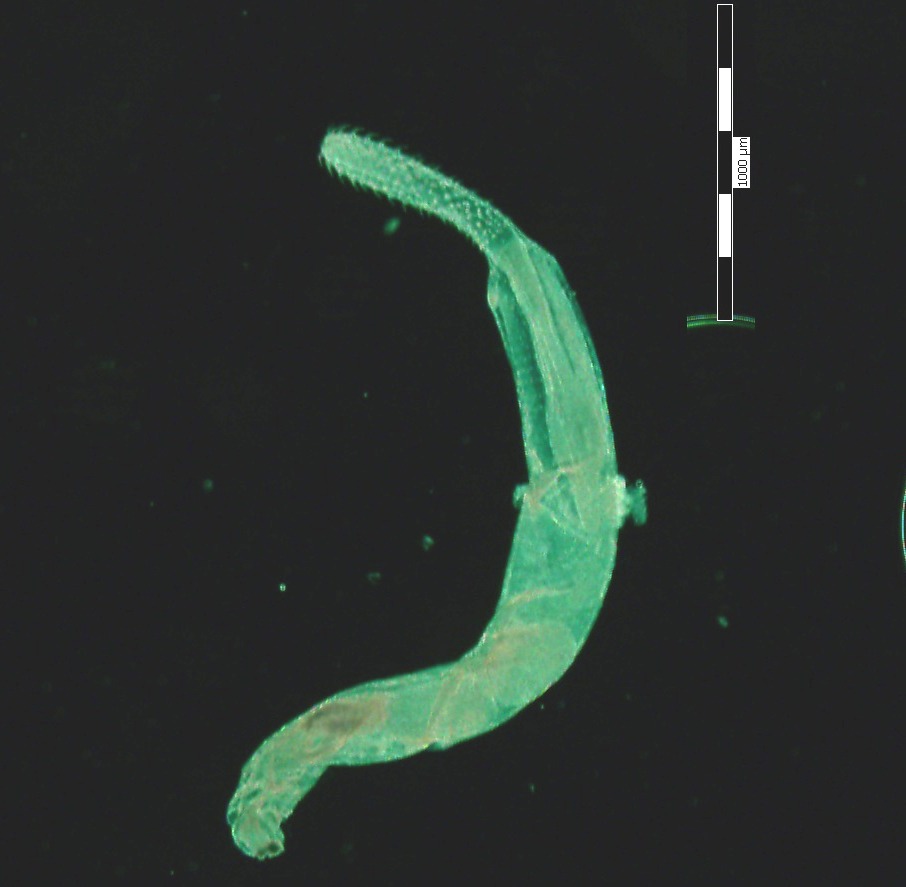
- Telosentis exiguus from the Big-scale sand smelt from France

Scientific classification
- Kingdom: Animalia
- Phylum: Acanthocephala
- Class: Palaeacanthocephala
- Order: Echinorhynchida
- Family: Illiosentidae
- Genus: Telosentis
- Species: T. exiguus

Binomial name
- Telosentis exiguus (von Linstow, 1901)

Synonyms
- Echinorhynchus exiguus von Linstow, 1901; Echinorhynchus atherinae Rudolphi, 1819; Echinorhynchus acanthosoma Westrumb, 1821; EEchinorhynchus lateralis Molin, 1858; Telosentis molini van Cleave, 1923

= Telosentis exiguus =

Species of thorny-headed worm

Telosentis exiguus is a widespread intestinal parasitic worm. Its hosts are marine and brackish water fish of the Mediterranean basin.

== Characteristics ==
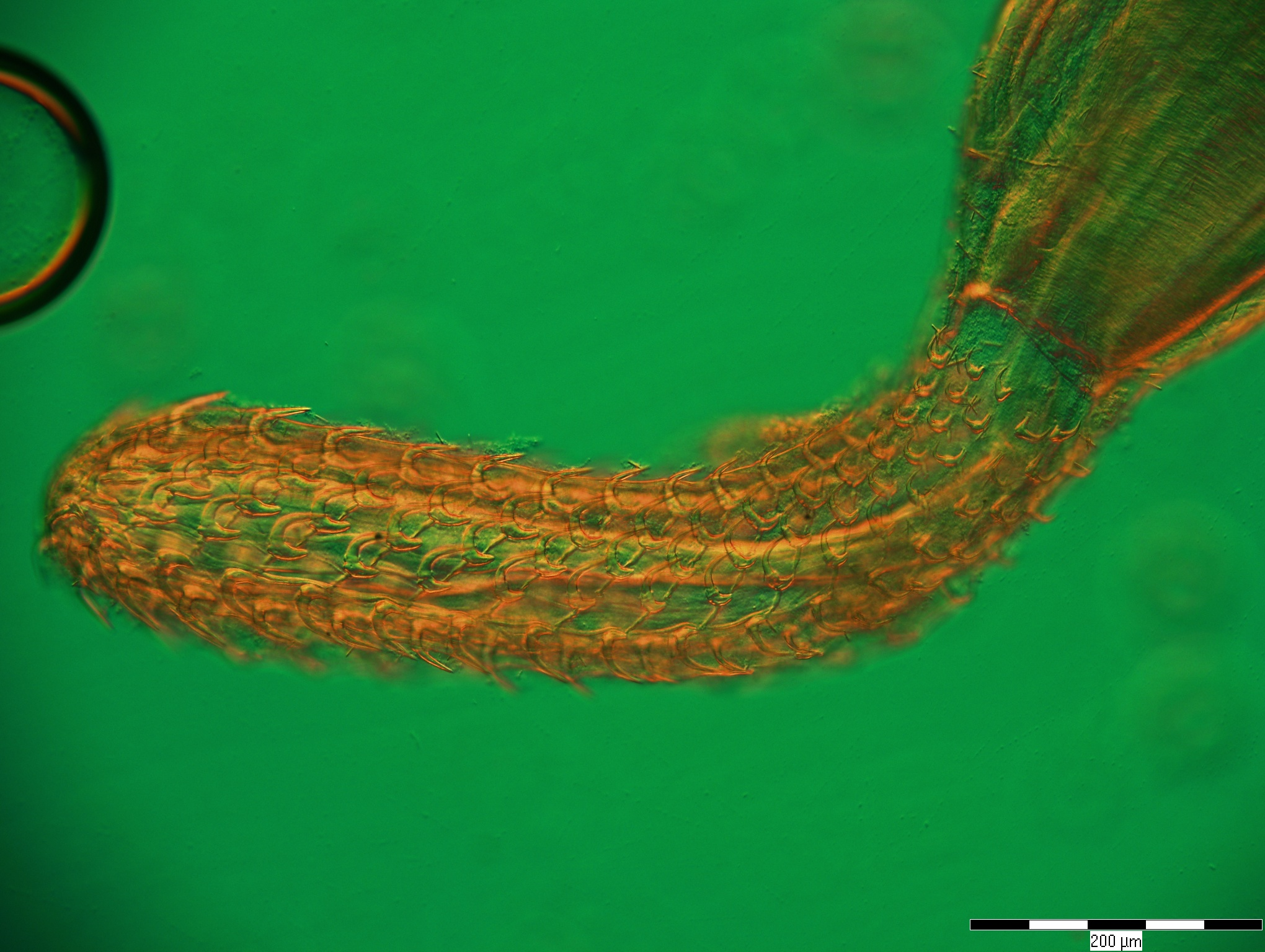
Proboscis of Telosentis exiguus from the grass goby from Ukraine

T. exiguus' tegument is covered with spines in anterior and posterior parts. Its cerebral ganglion located in central part of the proboscis sac, sometime moved to anterior region. Its proboscis is cylindrical or club-shaped, armed with 12 longitudinal rows of hooks of same type; the smaller hooks are in the posterior region of proboscis, larger is in its central part. The roots of the hooks have long forward-facing appendixes.

== Range ==
This species is found in the Mediterranean Sea (near the coasts of France and Italy), in the Adriatic Sea (Italy, Montenegro), the Sea of Marmara, the Black Sea and the Sea of Azov (near the coasts of Ukraine).

== Hosts ==
T. exiguus is able to thrive in a variety hosts. It has been found as an intestinal parasite in anchovies, sand-smelts, shads, garfishes, eels, sticklebacks, pipe-fishes, grass gobies, some other gobies, blennies, and wrasses.

== Life cycle ==
In the Black Sea the intermediate hosts of this acanthocephalan is the amphipod Apherusa bispinosa, in the coelom of which the cystacanthes are located. Fish are infested by feeding on amphipods infected with larvae.
