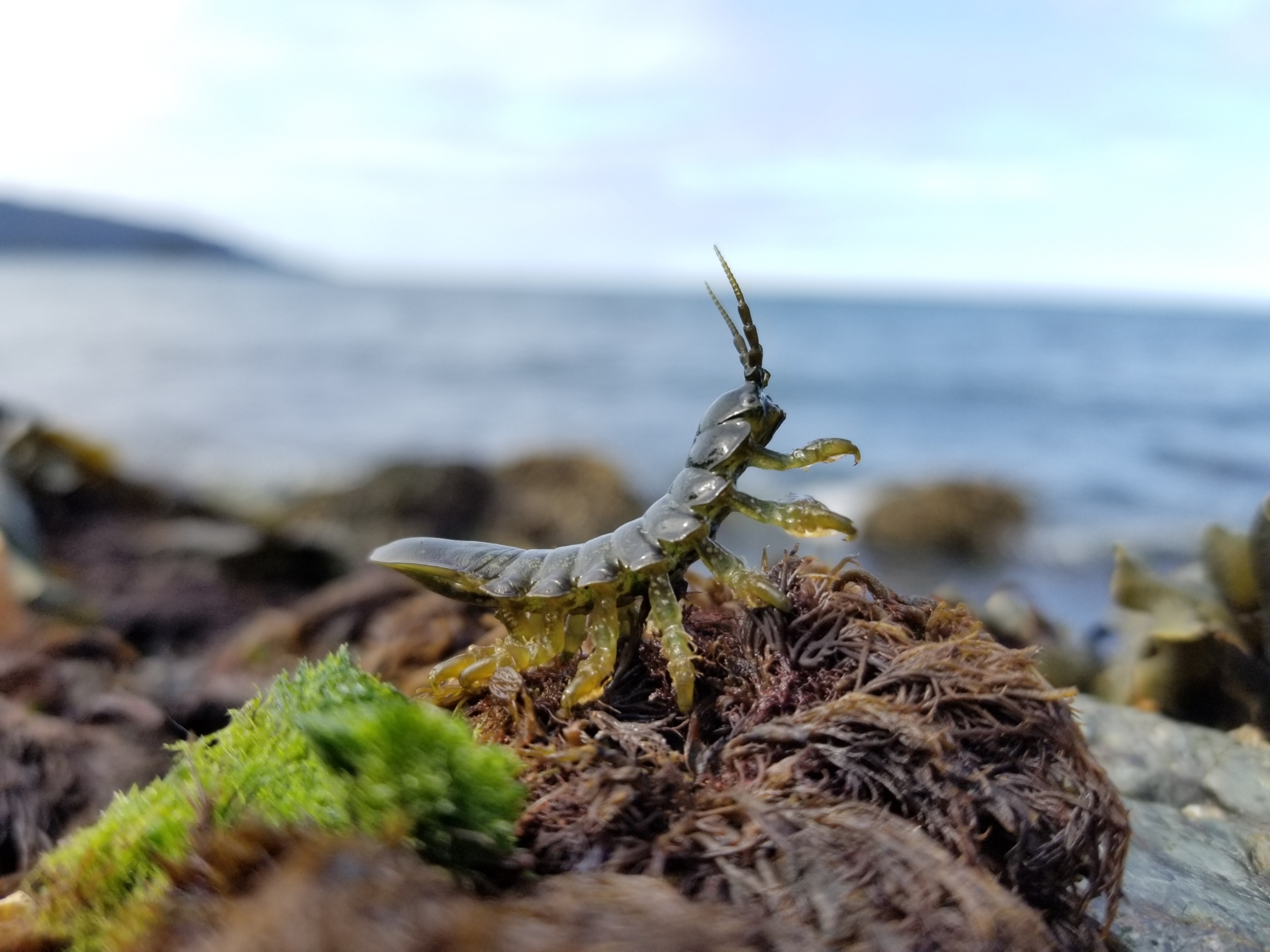

Scientific classification
- Kingdom: Animalia
- Phylum: Arthropoda
- Class: Malacostraca
- Order: Isopoda
- Family: Idoteidae
- Genus: Pentidotea
- Species: P. wosnesenskii

Binomial name
- Pentidotea wosnesenskii Brandt, 1851

Synonyms
- Idotea wosnesenskii (Brandt, 1851)

= Pentidotea wosnesenskii =

Species of crustacean

Pentidotea wosnesenskii is a marine isopod which lives on seaweed on rocky shores along the British Columbia and Washington coastlines, as far south as San Francisco. It can often be found hiding under rockweed (Fucus distichus) in the intertidal zone, and can be found at depths up to 919 metres (3,015 ft). It was described as Idotea wosnesenskii in 1851, by Johann Friedrich von Brandt, and is named after the Russian biologist Ilya G. Voznesensky. The isopod grows up to 4 centimetres (1.6 in) in length and is usually green in colour.

It is preyed upon by the surf scoter.
