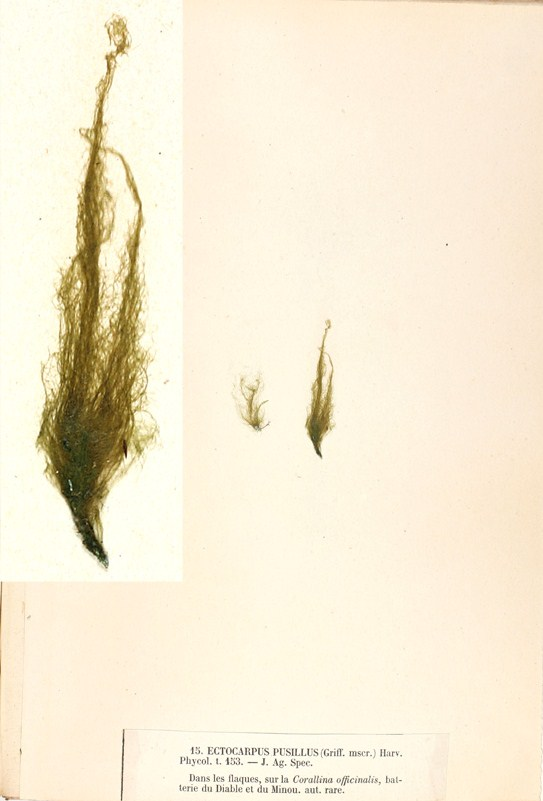
- Herbarium specimen of Acinetospora crinita, formerly Ectocarpus pusillus

Scientific classification
- Domain: Eukaryota
- Clade: Diaphoretickes
- Clade: SAR
- Clade: Stramenopiles
- Phylum: Gyrista
- Subphylum: Ochrophytina
- Class: Phaeophyceae
- Order: Ectocarpales
- Family: Acinetosporaceae; G.Hamel ex Feldmann

Genera
- See text

= Acinetosporaceae =

Family of seaweeds

Acinetosporaceae is a family of brown algae in the order Ectocarpales.

It includes eight genera:

- Acinetospora Bornet
- Feldmannia Hamel
- Geminocarpus Skottsberg
- Herponema J.Agardh
- Hincksia J.E.Gray
- Internoretia Setchell & N.L.Gardner
- Pogotrichum Reinke
- Pylaiella Bory
