= Voordelta =

Coastal area in the North Sea

Designations

Ramsar Wetland
- Designated: 29 August 2000
- Reference no.: 1279

The Voordelta is the coastal area in the North Sea, protected under Natura 2000. It is located to the west of the islands of the provinces of South Holland and Zeeland, around the deltas of Haringvliet, Grevelingen, and Oosterschelde. The total area of Voordelta is about 900 km^{2}.
