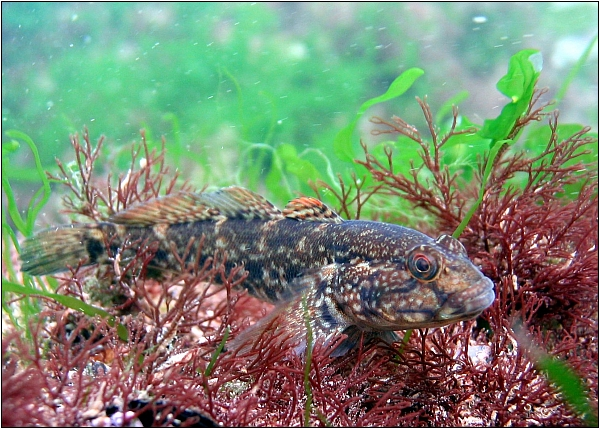

Conservation status
- Least Concern (IUCN 3.1)

Scientific classification
- Kingdom: Animalia
- Phylum: Chordata
- Class: Actinopterygii
- Division: Teleostei
- Order: Gobiiformes
- Family: Gobiidae
- Genus: Gobius
- Species: G. ophiocephalus

Binomial name
- Gobius ophiocephalus Pallas, 1814

Synonyms
- Zosterisessor ophiocephalus (Pallas, 1814); Gobius coloniamus Navarrete, 1898; Gobius lota Cuvier, 1829; Gobius lota Valenciennes in Cuvier & Valenciennes, 1837; Gobius ophiocephalus citrina Ninni, 1938; Gobius reticulatus von Eichwald, 1831; Gobius viridis Otto, 1821

= Grass goby =

Species of fish

The grass goby (Gobius ophiocephalus) is a species of goby native to the Mediterranean Sea, the Sea of Azov, and the Black Sea. It is sometimes classified as the only member of the monotypic genus Zosterisessor.

== Characteristics ==
Grass gobies can grow up to 29.9 cm (11.8 in) long. The head crown, nape, throat, belly, and bases of the pectoral fins are covered by cycloid scales and the gill covers are naked. The abdominal sucker has no blades and does not reach the anus. The mandibulae are protrusive, and the skin soft, with mucus. Their coloration is green-brown, patterned with merging brown spots. The cheeks have round light spots. The dorsal, caudal, and pectoral fins have longitudinal brown stripes on a light background; the anal and abdominal suckers are dark.

== Range ==
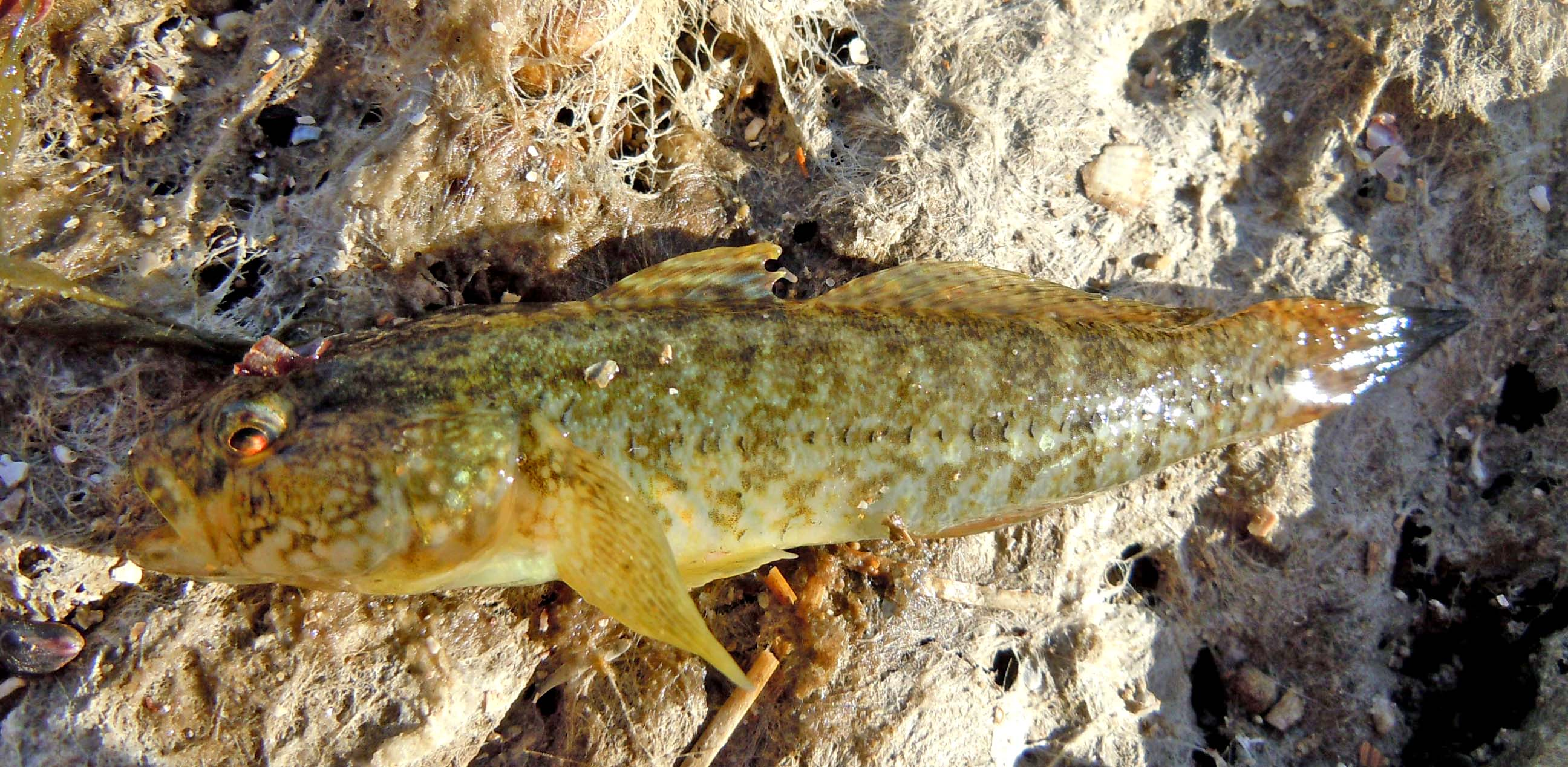
A grass goby from the Tylihul Estuary, Ukraine

Widespread in coastal waters of all seas of the Mediterranean basin, they are especially numerous in the northern Adriatic Sea, Venetian Lagoon, and Sète Lagoon (France) and in the Black Sea near all coasts, especially in lagoons and estuaries of the north-west, Varna and Burgas Bays, Sea of Azov, and Sivash.

== Diet ==
Until age two, grass gobies feed only on crustaceans, after which they start to eat fish. In Tuzly Lagoons, they first feed on gammarids Gammarus lacustris (94%), and Idotea balthica (6%) followed by fish like the big-scale sand smelt (30%) and gobies (36%). Shrimp Palaemon adspersus also play an important role.

== Parasites ==
On the Crimean coasts, the grass goby hosts about 27 parasite species. The acanthocephalans Acanthocephaloides propinquus are most numerous. In the northwestern Black Sea, this fish has 13 parasite species. Except for A. propinquus, the acanthocephalan Telosentis exiguus is very numerous. Both are Mediterranean immigrants as is the grass goby itself. The Ponto-Caspian cestodes Proteocephalus gobiorum and monogeneans Gyrodactylus proterorhini are also numerous. In the Budaki Lagoon, the grass goby is a host of larvae of epizootic nematode Streptocara crassicauda.

== Importance ==
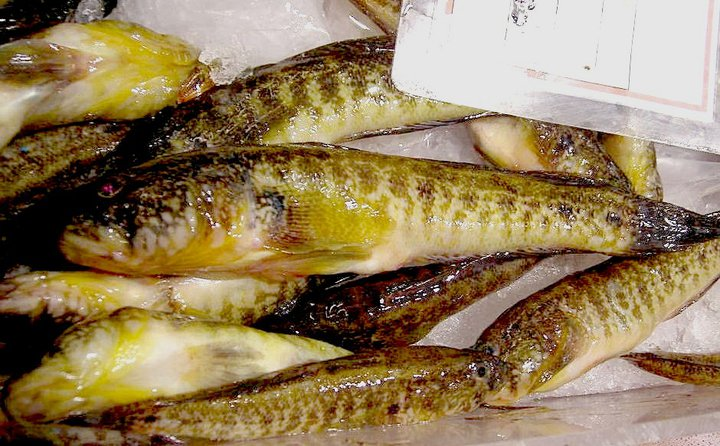
Grass goby for sale in a Sardinian market, Italy

The grass goby is eaten by some commercial fishes, such as the toad goby. In the Sea of Azov, it is used for food by the harbour porpoise.

The grass goby is a commercial fish in the Black Sea and the Sea of Azov, the Molochnyi Estuary, Tuzly Lagoons, and in the Sivash.

In Venetian cuisine, it is known as pesce gò or ghiozzo, and is the basis for the dish risotto di gò (rixoto de gò in Venetian) or risotto di Burano.
