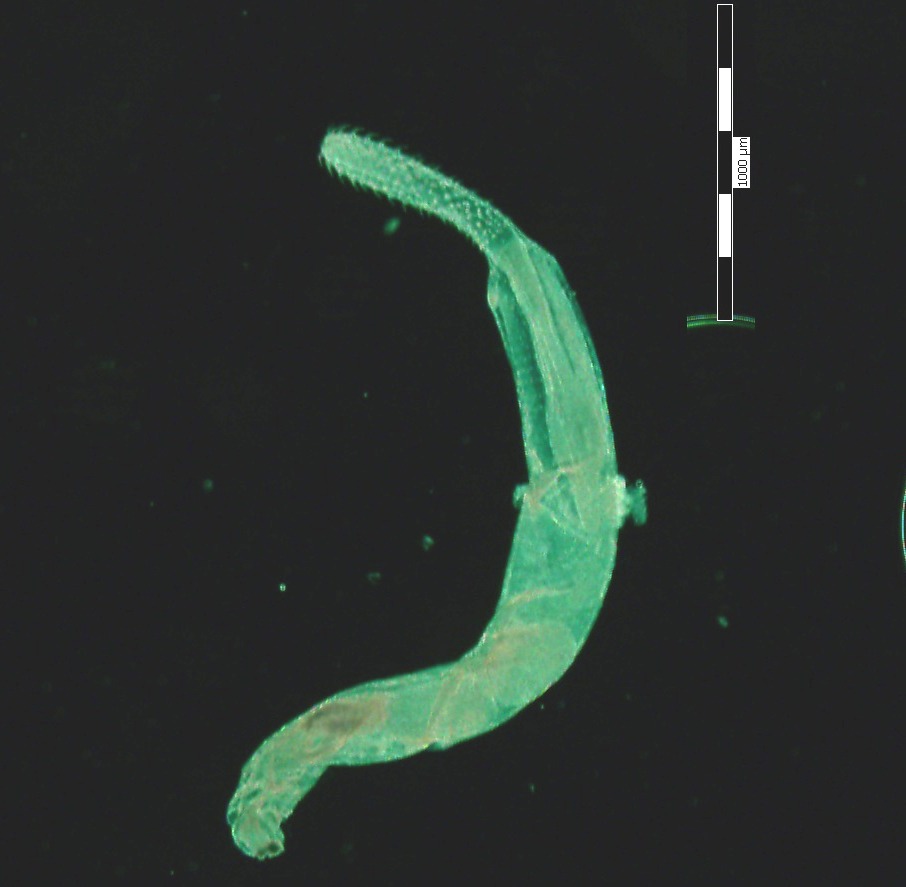
- Telosentis exiguus

Scientific classification
- Kingdom: Animalia
- Phylum: Acanthocephala
- Class: Palaeacanthocephala
- Order: Echinorhynchida
- Family: Leptorhynchoididae; Witenberg, 1932

Synonyms
- Illiosentidae Golvan, 1960

= Leptorhynchoididae =

Family of thorny-headed worms

Leptorhynchoididae is a family of parasitic worms from the order Echinorhynchida.

== Species ==
Leptorhynchoididae contains the following species: (Note: A binomial authority in parentheses indicates that the species was originally described in a genus other than the present genus.)

=== Brentisentis ===
Brentisentis Leotta, Schmidt & Kuntz, 1982 contains three species:

- Brentisentis chongqingensis Wei, 1998

The species name chongqingensis was named after the location where the samples were collected: Chongqing, China.

- Brentisentis uncinus Leotta, Schmidt, Kuntz, 1982

B. uncinus was found infesting the small intestines of the Tank goby (Glossogobius giuris) and Eleotris pisonis near the mouth of Keelung River, Taiwan.

- Brentisentis yangtzensis Yu and Wu, 1989

=== Dentitruncus ===
Dentitruncus Sinzar, 1955 contains one species:

- Dentitruncus truttae Sinzar, 1955

=== Dollfusentis ===
Golvan, 1969

- Dollfusentis bravoae Salgado-Maldonado, 1976
- Dollfusentis chandleri Golvan, 1969
- Dollfusentis ctenorhynchus (Cable & Linderoth, 1963) Golvan, 1969
- Dollfusentis heteracanthus (Cable and Linderoth, 1963)
- Dollfusentis longispinus (Cable & Linderoth, 1963) Golvan, 1969
- Dollfusentis salgadoi Monks, Aleman-Garcia & Pulido-Flores, 2008

=== Goacanthus ===
Gupta & Jain, 1980

- Goacanthus panajiensis Gupta and Jain, 1980

=== Indorhynchus ===
Golvan, 1969

- Indorhynchus indicus (Tripathi, 1959) Golvan, 1969
- Indorhynchus pseudobargi Wang and Wang, 1988

=== Koronacantha ===
Monks & Ponce de Leon, 1996

- Koronacantha mexicana Monks & Ponce de Leon, 1996
- Koronacantha pectinaria (Van Cleave, 1940) Monks & Pérez-Ponce de León, 1996

=== Metarhadinorhynchus ===
Yamaguti, 1959

- Metarhadinorhynchus cyprini Yin, 1961
- Metarhadinorhynchus echeneisi Gupta & Sinha, 1991
- Metarhadinorhynchus laterolabracis Yamaguti, 1959

M. laterolabracis is the type species.

- Metarhadinorhynchus thapari Gupta & Gupta, 1975
- Metarhadinorhynchus valiyathurae Nadakal, John et Jacob, 1990

=== Paradentitruncus ===
Moravec & Sey, 1989

- Paradentitruncus longireceptaculis Moravec & Sey, 1989

=== Pseudorhadinorhynchus ===
Achmerow & Dombrowskaja-Achmerova, 1941

- Pseudorhadinorhynchus cinereus Gupta & Nagui, 1983

P. cinereus was found infesting Stromateus cinereus in Pakistan.

- Pseudorhadinorhynchus deeghai Saxena, 2003
- Pseudorhadinorhynchus dhari Kumar, 1992
- Pseudorhadinorhynchus dussamicitatum Gupta & Gupta, 1972
- Pseudorhadinorhynchus ernakulensis Gupta & Gupta, 1972
- Pseudorhadinorhynchus guptai Gupta & Sinha, 1993
- Pseudorhadinorhynchus leuciscus (Krotov & Petrochenko, 1956)
- Pseudorhadinorhynchus longicollum Gupta & Naqvi, 1986
- Pseudorhadinorhynchus machidai Kumar, 1992
- Pseudorhadinorhynchus markewitschi Achmerov and Dombrovskaja-Achmerova, 1941
- Pseudorhadinorhynchus mujibi Gupta & Nagui, 1983

P. mujibi was found infesting Stromateus sinensis in Pakistan.

- Pseudorhadinorhynchus nandai Gupta and Sinha, 1993
- Pseudorhadinorhynchus orissai Gupta & Fatma, 1985
- Pseudorhadinorhynchus pseudaspii Achmerov and Dombrovskaja-Achmerova, 1941
- Pseudorhadinorhynchus samegaiensis Nakajima & Egusa, 1975
- Pseudorhadinorhynchus srivastavai Gupta & Fatma, 1985
- Pseudorhadinorhynchus vietnamensis Moravec and Sey, 1989

=== Tegorhynchus ===
Van Cleve, 1921

- Tegorhynchus africanus (Golvan, 1955)
- Tegorhynchus brevis Van Cleave, 1921
- Tegorhynchus cetratus (Van Cleave, 1945)
- Tegorhynchus edmondsi (Golvan, 1960)
- Tegorhynchus furcatus (Van Cleave & Lincicome, 1939)
- Tegorhynchus holospinus Amin & Sey, 1996
- Tegorhynchus multacanthus (Mamaev, 1970) Amin & Sey, 1996

=== Telosentis ===
Telosentis Van Cleve, 1923 is a genus of acanthocephalans. The representatives of the genus are distributed in tropical waters of Indian Ocean, Pacific coast of Australia and Mediterranean. Consists of five species:

- Telosentis australiensis Edmonds, 1964
- Telosentis exiguus (von Linstow, 1901)

T. exiguus is a widespread intestinal parasitic worm. Its hosts are marine and brackish water fish of the Mediterranean basin. This species is found in the Mediterranean Sea (near the coasts of France and Italy), in the Adriatic Sea (Italy, Montenegro), the Sea of Marmara, the Black Sea and the Sea of Azov (near the coasts of Ukraine). T. exiguus is able to thrive in a variety hosts. It has been found as an intestinal parasite in anchovies, sand-smelts, shads, garfishes, eels, sticklebacks, pipe-fishes, grass gobies, some other gobies, blennies, and wrasses.

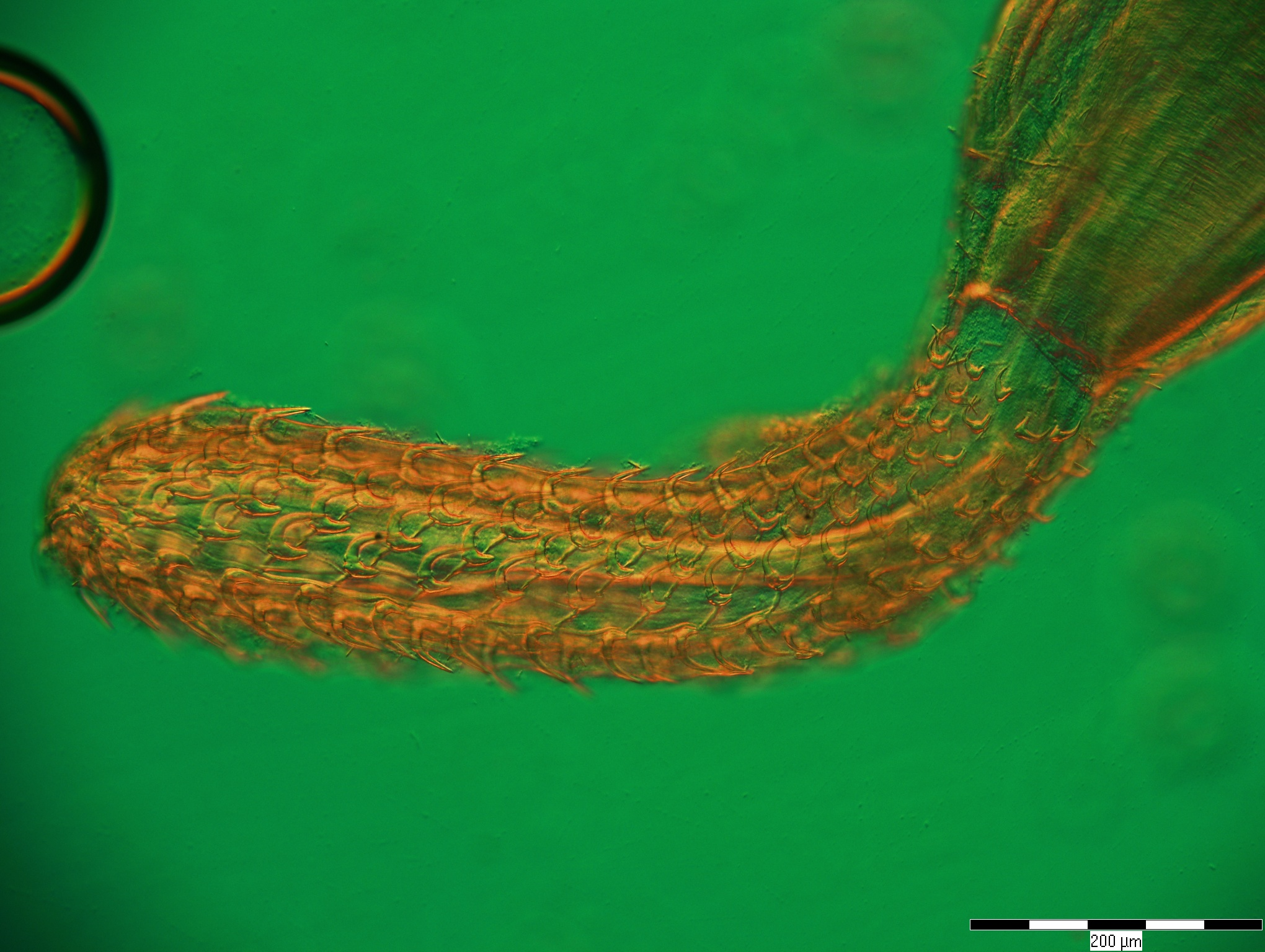
Proboscis of Telosentis exiguus from the grass goby from Ukraine

T. exiguus' tegument is covered with spines in anterior and posterior parts. Its cerebral ganglion located in central part of the proboscis sac, sometime moved to anterior region. Its proboscis is cylindrical or club-shaped, armed with 12 longitudinal rows of hooks of same type; the smaller hooks are in the posterior region of proboscis, larger is in its central part. The roots of the hooks have long forward-facing appendixes.

In the Black Sea the intermediate hosts of this acanthocephalan is the amphipod Apherusa bispinosa, in the coelom of which the cystacanthes are located. Fish are infested by feeding on amphipods infected with larvae.

- Telosentis lutianusi Gupta & Gupta, 1990
- Telosentis mizellei Gupta & Fatma, 1988
- Telosentis molini Van Cleave, 1923
