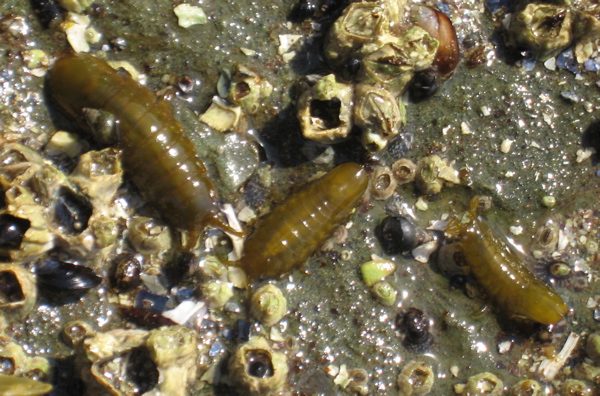
- Pentidotea wosnesenskii
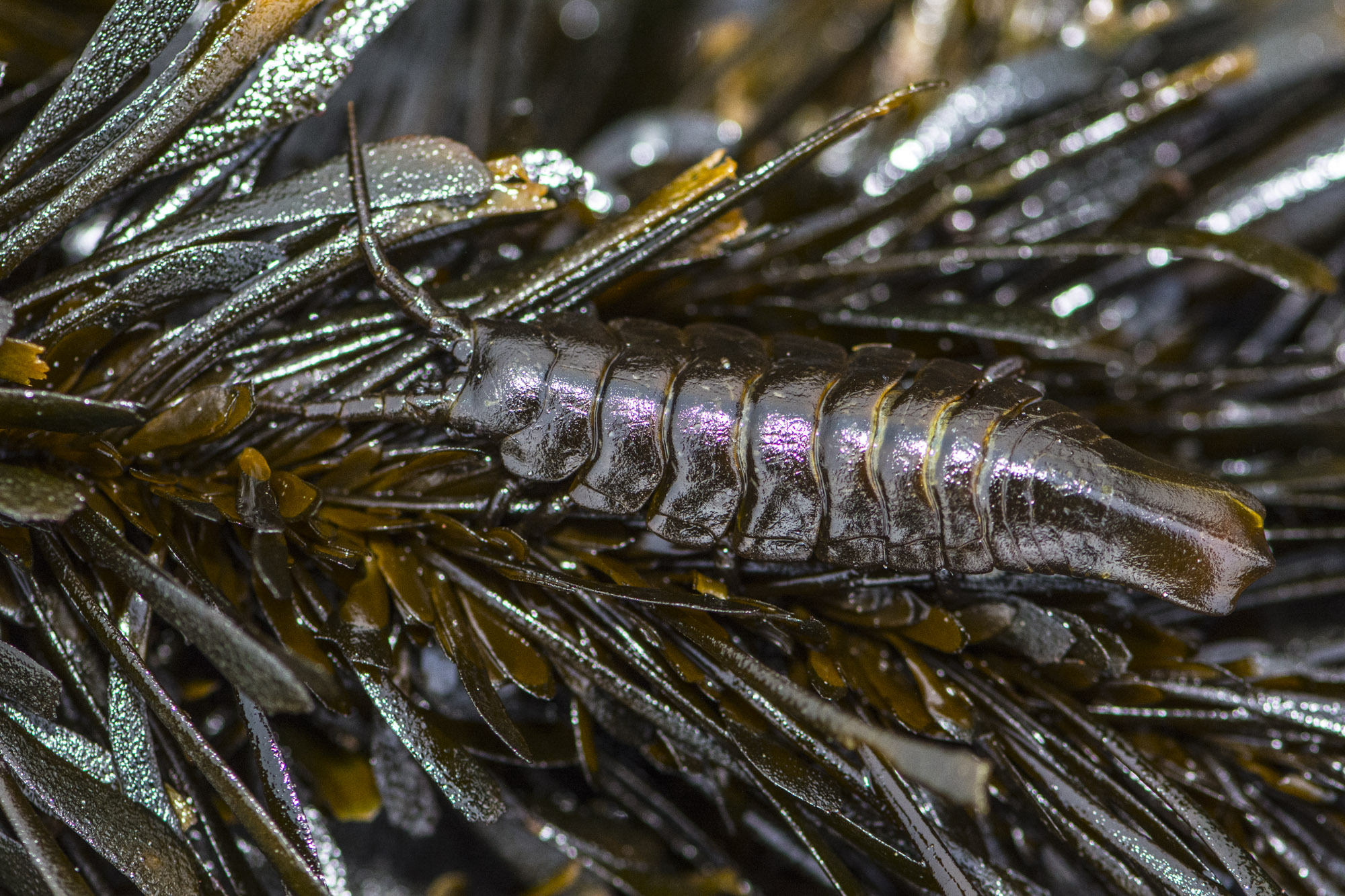
- Pentidotea stenops, one of the largest Isopods of the California coast

Scientific classification
- Kingdom: Animalia
- Phylum: Arthropoda
- Clade: Pancrustacea
- Class: Malacostraca
- Order: Isopoda
- Suborder: Valvifera
- Family: Idoteidae; Samouelle, 1819

Genera
- See text

= Idoteidae =

Family of crustaceans

Idoteidae is a family of aquatic isopods.

== Genera ==
The family includes the following genera:

- Austridotea Poore, 2001
- Batedotea Poore & Lew Ton, 1993
- Cleantiella Richardson, 1912
- Colidotea Richardson, 1899
- Crabyzos Bate, 1863
- Edotia Guérin-Méneville, 1843
- Engidotea Barnard, 1914
- Erichsonella Benedict in Richardson, 1901
- Euidotea Collinge, 1917
- Eusymmerus Richardson, 1899
- Glyptidotea Stebbing, 1902
- Idotea Fabricius, 1798
- Koridotea Song & Min, 2017
- Lyidotea Hale, 1929
- †Mesozoidotea Wilson & Morel, 2022
- Moplisa Moreira, 1974
- Parasymmerus Brusca & Wallerstein, 1979
- Paridotea Stebbing, 1900
- Pentias Richardson, 1904
- Pentidotea Richardson, 1905
- Platidotea Park & Wägele, 1995
- Stenosoma Leach, 1814
- Synidotea Harger, 1878
- Synischia Hale, 1924
- Takereana Poore & Hurley, 2015
