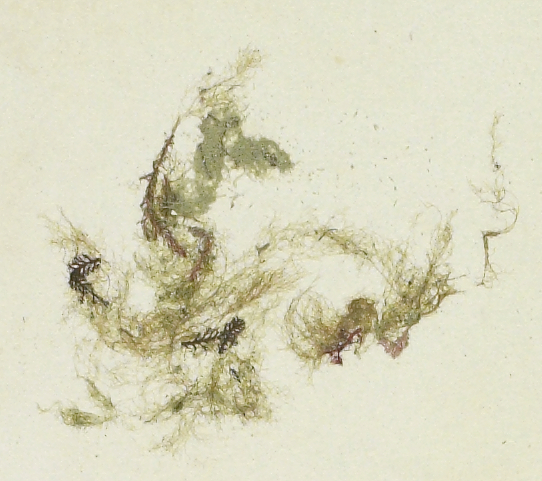
- Pressed herbarium specimen of Z. abyssicola from 1934
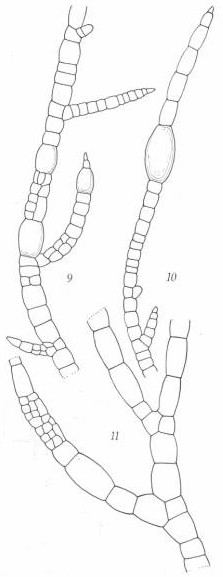
- Fig. 9, part of a branch showing the branchlets, young tannin-filled cells, and early gametangium development. Fig. 10, branch tip showing the acute apex, the intercalary growth zones, and a yellow tannin-filled cell. Fig. 11, junctions of the forks of two larger branches and a well-developed gametangial area

Conservation status
- Data Deficient (IUCN 3.1)

Scientific classification
- Domain: Eukaryota
- Clade: Sar
- Clade: Stramenopiles
- Division: Ochrophyta
- Class: Phaeophyceae
- Order: Ectocarpales
- Family: Chordariaceae
- Genus: Zosterocarpus
- Species: Z. abyssicola

Binomial name
- Zosterocarpus abyssicola W.R.Taylor, 1945

Synonyms
- Zosterocarpus abyssicolus W.R.Taylor, 1945

= Zosterocarpus abyssicola =

Species of seaweed

Zosterocarpus abyssicola is a species of brown algae endemic to the Galápagos Islands.

== Distribution ==
This is a very inconspicuous species and hard to identify, so much that it is only known from its collection of types. The only specimens were collected in 1934 at Post Office Bay by Floreana Island in the Galápagos Islands, and the species is considered endemic to the area. A 2007 search failed to find any further specimens.

== Etymology ==
The specific epithet abyssicola derives from the Greek ἄβυσσος (ávyssos) and Latin -cola, meaning one who inhabits the abyss. However, it has only been found at 55 meters depth, and is photosynthetic, so the name is hyperbole.

== Description ==
The thallus is a light green-brown and 1–2 cm tall. The form is rather diffuse and spreading, without a persistent main axis. The cells of the major branches are thin-walled, cylindrical, and 32 μm in diameter and 58–65 μm long.

The characteristic oval brown cells were assumed to be the sporangia by Taylor, but are special tannin-filled cells. These are scattered throughout the upper thallus, but solitary, measuring about 30 μm in diameter and 68–70 μm long. They contain oval-shaped bodies.

The gametangia are in clusters of 4–6 cells and only 6–8 μm in diameter.

The species lacks phaeophycean "hairs" and the parenchyma is weakly developed. It is more slender than Z. oedogonium, and the brown tannin cells for the former are wider than the rest of the filaments, ad opposed to the same size. Z. ogasawaraensis and Z. australicus lack these special cells. The latter two also have laterals that arise from single sells on the filaments and not from the septa between cells like the former two species.

== Ecology ==
The species is an epiphyte. It is thought to be eaten by sea urchins.

== Conservation ==
It has been evaluated by the IUCN as data deficient, and is one of only fifteen protists evaluated by IUCN. Like Desmarestia tropica, another William Randolph Taylor find from the same expedition, it is threatened by warming ocean temperatures and overgrazing by sea urchins.
