= Mozuku =

Edible seaweed species from Chordariaceae

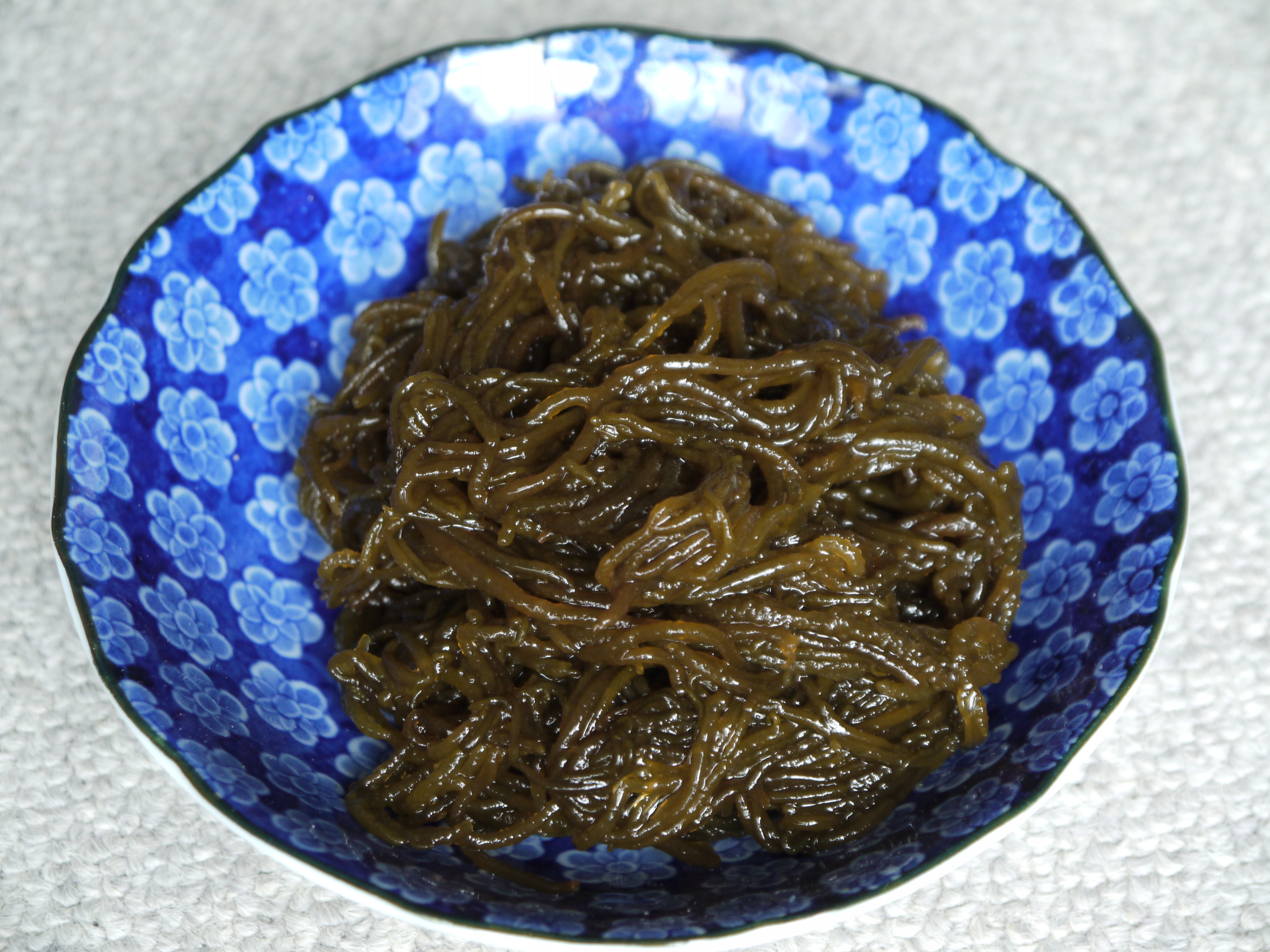

Mozuku is a collective term for various types of Japanese brown algae from the family Chordariaceae, which are used as food. These include ito-mozuku (Nemacystus decipiens), Okinawa mozuku (Cladosiphon okamuranus), ishi-mozuku (Sphaerotrichia divaricata) and futo mozuku (Tinocladia crassa). Occasionally the aquatic flowering plant Hydrilla verticillata is referred to as mozuku.
