= Paul Reinsch =

Paul Reinsch may refer to:

- Paul Samuel Reinsch (1869–1923), American political scientist and diplomat
- Paul Friedrich Reinsch (1836–1914), German phycologist and paleontologist
