= Friedrich Berthold Reinke =

German anatomist (1862–1919)

Dr. Friedrich B. Reinke
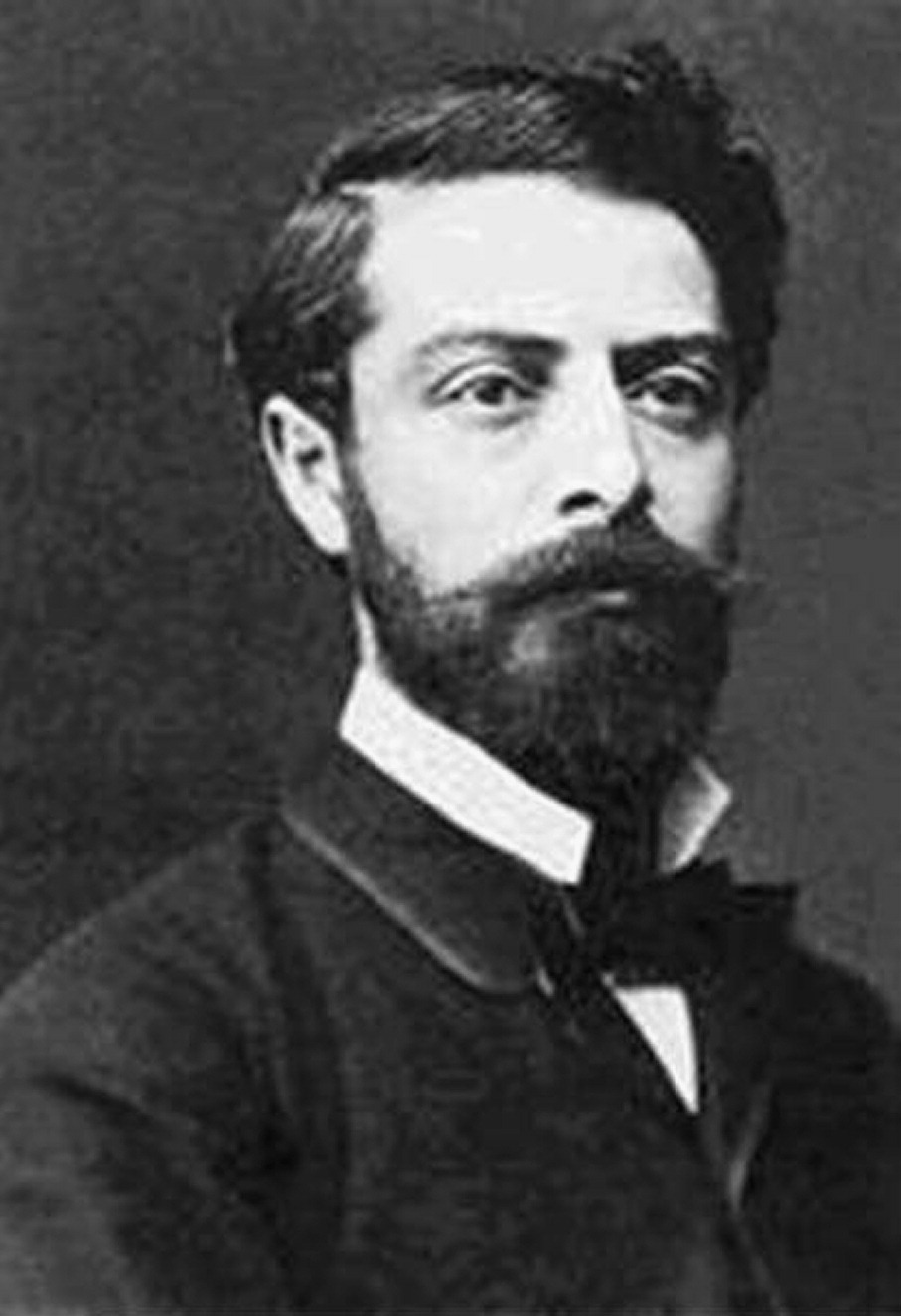
- Friedrich Reinke at 24 years of age (as medical student).
- Born: 11 April 1862; Zeithen, Schleswig-Holstein, Germany
- Died: 12 May 1919 (aged 57); Paulinen Hospital, Wiesbaden
- Occupation: Anatomist
- Spouse: Auguste von Zülow
- Children: Hans Gebhard
- Parent(s): Mr Theodor Friedrich Julius Reinke and Mrs Elisabeth Henriette Karoline Gottfriede Juliane Reinke
- Relatives: Johannes Reinke (brother)

Signature
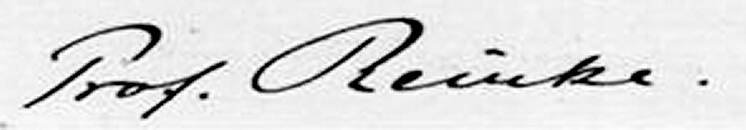

Friedrich Reinke (11 April 1862 – 12 May 1919) was a German anatomist. Reinke crystals, Reinke's space and Reinke's edema are named after him.

== Childhood ==
Friedrich was the ninth of ten children born to Mr Theodor Friedrich Julius Reinke (1817–1887) a Lutheran Pastor, and Mrs Elisabeth Henriette Karoline Gottfriede Juliane Reinke, born Kämpffer (1821–1880).

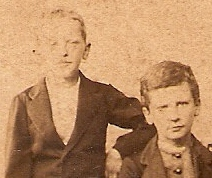
Friedrich Reinke (right) with elder brother Johannes Reinke (left)

== Education ==
He was born in Ziethen a small town in the Principality of Ratzeburg and died in Wiesbaden (Hesse-Nassau, Provinces of Prussia). One of his siblings was Johannes Reinke a botanist and philosopher.

Friedrich was educated at home until the age of 14, principally by his father and an aunt. Reinke attended Neustrelitz High School and was later transferred to Große Stadtschule, today referred to as Goethe-Schule, in Rostock in 1882, where he graduated in 1883.

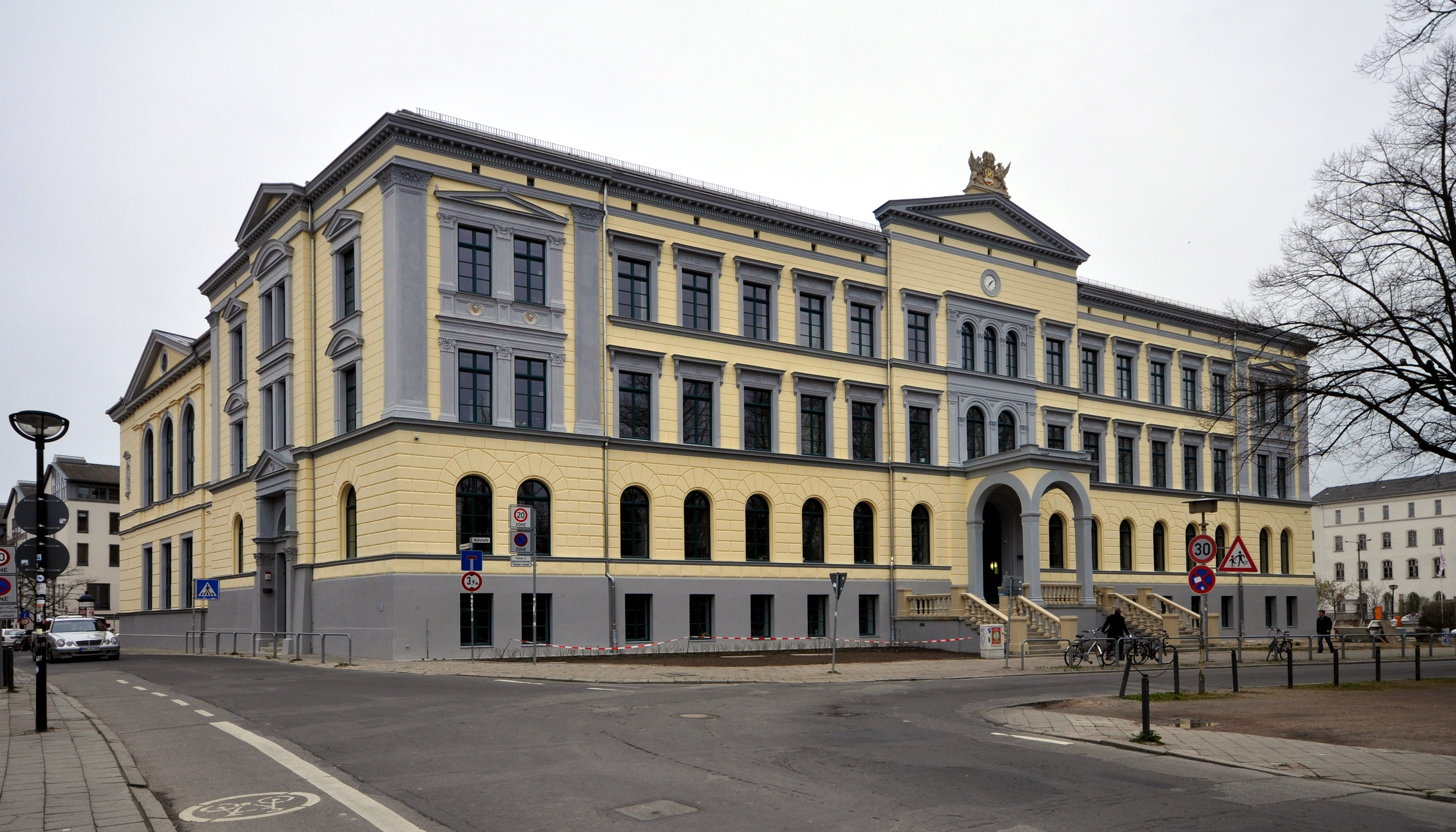
Große Stadtschule Rostock, Rostock. In 1883 Reinke graduated as a matriculation examination, Abitur

Reinke began his medical studies in 1883 at the University of Goettingen and the University of Kiel received his medical degree on 28 March 1891 with a specialization in anatomy. His doctoral thesis, Untersuchungen über das Verhältnis der von Arnold beschriebenen Kernformen zur Mitose und Amitose (Investigations into the relationship of the nuclear forms described by Arnold to mitosis and amitosis), was an in-depth study of cell division. Upon graduation, Reinke completed a 6-month internship at the Pathology Institute of the University of Zurich. There, he studied under Edwin Klebs. Reinke developed a collegial relationship with Otto Lubarsch, who at that time was an assistant in the Institute. On completion of his internship, Reinke served as a ship's doctor on the passenger liner Weiland bound for Brazil where he visited some members of his family. He returned to Germany in 1893 to complete a second internship as a junior physician in Dahmen, Mecklenburg. Subsequently, Professor Albert von Brunn offered Reinke the position of first demonstrator at the Anatomical Institute of the University of Rostock, perhaps through the intercession of Dr Lubarsch. There he achieved his habilitation, or Venia Legendi, a postdoctoral qualification common to many European academic systems that entitles the holder to supervise doctoral candidates and is thus essential for an academic career. His habilitation thesis, reviewed and defended before committee, was entitled Zellstudien (Cellular Studies), an investigation of the cell structure in the germ layer of the human skin. Specifically, he investigated leukocytes, the cells of the conjunctive tissue, collagenous and elastic fibers, pigment, and cell differentiation.

== Personal life ==
Reinke married Julie Caroline Friederike Auguste von Zülow, the daughter of an imperial postmaster on 12 August 1902. Not wealthy in his own right, Reinke may have acquired some means through marriage, as he was able to renounce his salary during a subsequent professional disagreement. On 21 May 1904 Friedrich and Auguste gave birth to their only child, Hans Gebhard Reinke, who eventually became a theologian like his grandfather.

== Professional life ==
On 1 April 1893 Reinke assumed his first academic position as first demonstrator at the Anatomical Institute in Rostock under the direction of Professor Albert von Brunn. Reinke must have asserted himself professionally, for just 4 months later, in August, Reinke was promoted to extraordinary professor of medicine.

In April 1895, Professor von Brunn suffered a fatal cardiac arrest, and Reinke was appointed interim director of the Anatomical Institute in his place. The first of his two landmark publications in laryngeal anatomy, Untersuchung über das menschliche Stimmband (Investigation into the human vocal fold), in which he described the superior and inferior arcuate lines as the boundaries of the squamous epithelium of the vocal fold, and of the tissue layer which now bears his name, was published in the same year. The origin of his interest in the larynx remains obscure. There exists mention of his being motivated by his interest in the larynx of the birds singing outside his office window.

One year later, in 1896, Dietrich Barfurth (1849–1927), a professor from the Imperial University of Dorpat, was appointed full professor and director of the Anatomical Institute, displacing Reinke. Under the circumstances, it is not surprising that Reinke and his successor did not get along. In October 1900, Reinke was further promoted in the medical faculty, which resulted in more animosity between him and Barfurth. Having been interim director himself, Reinke apparently had some difficulty accepting Barfurth's authority and viewed him as a colleague rather than a superior.

Reinke's dispute with Barfurth seems not to have been an isolated event. Reinke was described as impetuous, reckless, and coarse. In addition, outbreaks of abrupt rage were not uncommon if Dr Reinke was contradicted. As mentioned previously, Reinke relinquished his salary during one infamous dispute with Barfurth, which began over Reinke's refusal to prepare some human fetuses as anatomical specimens.

Reinke's second publication concerning the larynx, Über die funktionelle Struktur der menschlichen Stimmlippen mit besonderer Berücksichtigung des elastischen Gewebes (On the functional structure of the human vocal folds with special consideration of the elastic tissue), dates to this contentious period in his life. Besides the superficial lamina propria of the vocal fold, Reinke's other eponym is attached to crystals found in Leydig cells of the human testes and hilar cells of the human ovary. His publications reveal a special interest in cell division, embryology, and cell interactions. One article, Beziehungen des Lymphdruckes zu den Erscheinungen der Regeneration und des Wachstums (Relations of the pressure of the lymph to the phenomena of regeneration and growth), encroaches on topics of Dr Barfurth's special expertise, and perhaps the investigation was undertaken as a challenge to him.

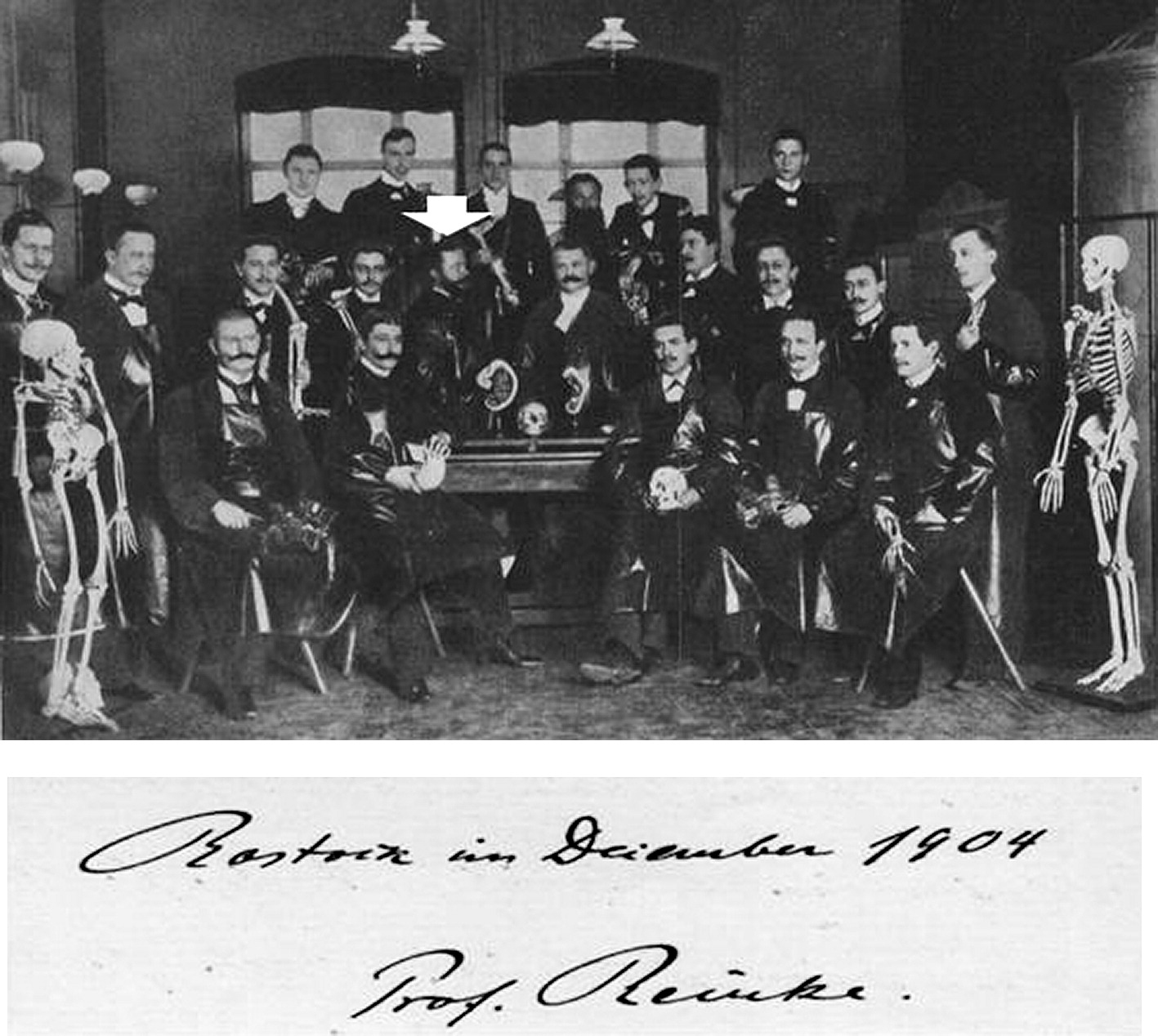
Reinke in 1904

His focus on investigational work at the expense of teaching was to be the final irritant in his relationship with Barfurth. On 1 October 1904 Barfurth suspended Reinke as demonstrator of the Institute of Anatomy for misconduct. Reasons cited in his personnel file include friction with Barfurth, neglect of his teaching responsibilities, refusal to obey instructions, and his free-form approach to holidays and vacations.

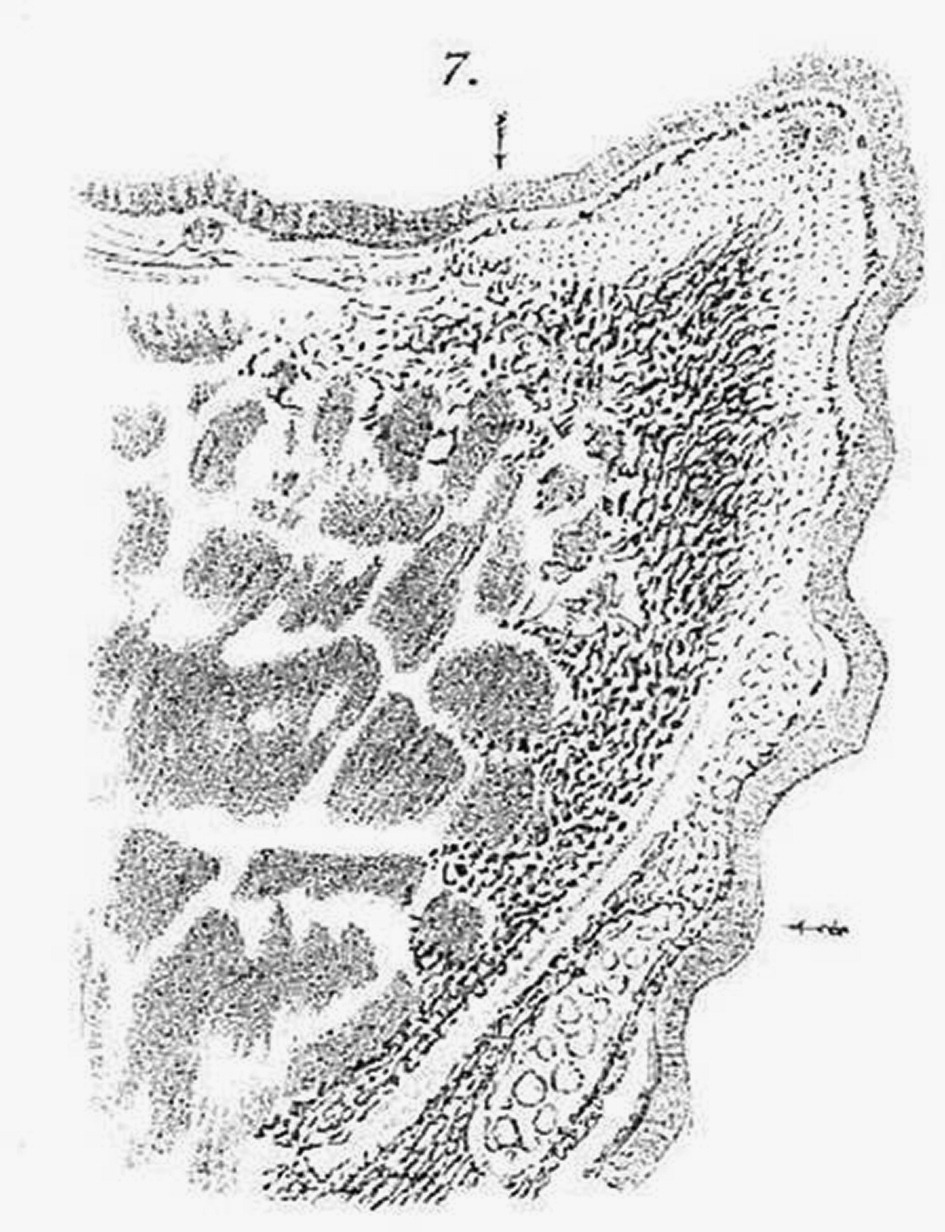
Cross-section of the vocal fold by Reinke

In 1907, while still maintaining his faculty appointment in medicine at Rostock, Reinke assumed a position as demonstrator at the urban hospital in Wiesbaden under Professor Gotthold Herxheimer. He continued his investigations on cell division and tumor formation and continued to publish extensively. Reinke was finally dismissed from his professorship in Rostock in March 1914 under unclear circumstances, but apparently again as a result of intervention by Barfurth. It is apparent that his professional efforts were invested elsewhere by this time. He went on to oversee the laboratory operations at Dr -Horst-Schmitt-Kliniken while most of his colleagues were on military service during World War I. On 12 May 1919, aged 58, Reinke died of gastric cancer in Paulinen Stift (Paulinen Hospital), a charity institution in Wiesbaden, a circumstance, which strongly suggests that he died in poverty.

== Timeline ==
Year	Important events with academic work
1862	11 April (11:45 am): Born to Reverend Theodor Friedrich Julius Reinke and Mrs Elisabeth Henriette Karoline Gottfriede Juliane Reinke; 6 May: Christened in the Cathedral of Ratzeburg
1875	Attended high school Carolinum in Neustrelitz
1882	Attended high school Große Stadtschule in Rostock
1883	Qualified for studies at Große Stadtschule
1884	Studied medicine in Goettingen and Kiel
1887	Served as student assistant under Professor Walther Flemming in Kiel; Untersuchungen über die Hornhautgebilde der Säugethierhaut (Investigations into the corneal formations of the mammalian skin)
1888	Experimentelle Untersuchungen über die Proliferation und Weiterentwicklung von Leukozyten (Experimental investigations on the proliferation and advancement into the leukocytes)
1890	Passed the state medical examination in Kiel
1891	28 March: Licensed to practice medicine; Completed doctoral dissertation, Untersuchungen über das Verhältnis der von Arnold beschriebenen Kernformen zur Mitose und Amitose (Investigations into the relationship of the core forms to mitosis and amitosis described by Arnold); Left Kiel for Zurich to become assistant at the Pathology Institute of the University of Zurich under Professor Edwin Klebs
1892	Appointed junior physician in Dahmen (Mecklenburg, Germany)
1893	1 April: Appointed first demonstrator in the Anatomical Institute of the University of Rostock under Professor Albert von Brunn; Completed his Venia Legendi; postdoctoral habilitation thesis Zellstudien (Cell studies); August: Appointed outside lecturer by the medical faculty of the University of Rostock; Über einige Versuche mit Lysol an frischen Geweben zur Darstellung histologischer Feinheiten (Regarding trials with lysol on fresh tissues for the description of histological details); Über einige weitere Resultate der Lysolwirkung an frischen Geweben zur Darstellung histologischer Feinheiten (Regarding further results of the effects of lysol on fresh tissues for the description of histological details)
1894	Published his habilitation treatise Zellstudien (Cell studies)
1895	April: Appointed interim director in the Anatomical Institute after the sudden death of Professor von Brunn; Zellstudien II. Teil (Cell studies. Part II); Die japanische Methode zum Aufkleben von Paraffinschnitten (The Japanese method for fixation of paraffin sections); Untersuchung über das menschliche Stimmband (Investigation on the human vocal fold); Untersuchungen über Befruchtung und Furchung des Eies der Echinodermen (Investigations into fertilization and cleavage into the egg of the echinoderms)
1896	1 April: Replaced as director, Anatomical Institute of the University of Rostock by Professor Dietrich Barfurth; Beiträge zur Histologie des Menschen I. Teil. Über Krystalloidbildungen in den interstitiellen Zellen des menschlichen Hodens (Contributions to the histology of humans, Part I: On building of crystalloids in the interstitial cells of the human testicle)
1897	Beiträge zur Histologie des Menschen. II. Teil. Über die funktionelle Struktur der menschlichen Stimmlippen mit besonderer Berücksichtigung des elastischen Gewebes (Contributions to the histology of humans, Part II: On the functional structure of the human vocal folds with special consideration of the elastic tissue)
1898	Über direkte Kernteilung und Kernschwund der menschlichen Leberzellen (About the direct nuclear division and nuclear decrease of the human liver cells)
1899	Kurzes Lehrbuch der Anatomie des Menschen für Studirende und Aerzte mit genauster Berücksichtigung der Baseler anatomischen Nomenclatur (Short textbook of human anatomy for students and physicians with most exact consideration of the anatomical nomenclature of Basel)
1900	9 October: Appointed extraordinary professor of medicine; Über den mitotischen Druck. Untersuchungen an den Zellen der Blutkapillaren der Salamanderlarve (On mitotic pressure. Investigations into the cells of the blood capillaries of salamander larva): Zum Beweis der trajektoriellen Natur der Plasmastrahlungen. Ein Beitrag zur Mechanik der Mitose (On the proof of the trajectorial nature of plasma radiations. A contribution to the mechanics of the mitosis)
1901	Grundzüge der allgemeinen Anatomie. Zur Vorbereitung auf das Studium der Medizin nach biologischen esichtspunkten (Fundaments of general anatomy. On the preparation for the study of medicine on the basis of biological criteria)
1902	12 August: Married to Julie Caroline Friederike Auguste Reinke formerly von Zülow (19 April 1869 – 26 July 1942) in Kiel, Germany; Die Regeneration der Linse und ihr Verhältnis zum Zweckbegriff (The regeneration of the lens and its relationship to the concept of purpose)
1904	2 May: Birth of son, Hans Gebhard; christened on 3 August in Nikolaikirche, Rostock, Germany; 1 October: Dismissed from the Anatomical Institute of the University of Rostock on grounds of misconduct by Professor Dietrich Barfurth
1906	Beziehungen des Lymphdruckes zu den Erscheinungen der Regeneration und des Wachstums (Relations of the pressure of the lymph with the phenomena of regeneration and growth); Über die Beziehungen der Wanderzellen zu den Zellbrücken, Zelllücken und Trophospongien (On the relation of the moving cells to cell bridges, cell gaps, and trophospongia)
1907	Moved to Wiesbaden and was appointed first demonstrator in the urban hospital under Professor Gotthold Herxheimer; Die quantitative und qualitative Wirkung der Ätherlymphe auf das Wachstum des Gehirns der Salamanderlarve (The quantitative and qualitative effect of ether lymph on the growth of the brain of the salamander larva); Über Antreibung und Hemmung mitotischer Zellteilung beim normalen und pathologischen Wachstum des Gewebes (About promotion and inhibition of mitotic cell division in normal and pathological tissue development); Über Methoden der Einwirkung auf die mitotische Kern- und Zellteilung (About the methods of effect on mitotic nuclear and cell division)
1908	Durch Äther erzeugte, atypische Entwicklung des Gehirns der Salamanderlarve. Teil II (Atypical development of the brain of the salamander larva produced by ether. Part II)
1912	Pathologie des Krebses (Pathology of cancer)
1913	Experimentelle Forschungen an Säugetieren über Erzeugung künstlicher Blastome (Experimental research on mammals regarding the production of artificial blastomas)
1914	31 March: Dismissed from professorship at the University of Rostock
1919	12 May: Died of gastric cancer at the Paulinen Hospital in Wiesbaden, Germany. Survived by his wife and son

== Gallery ==
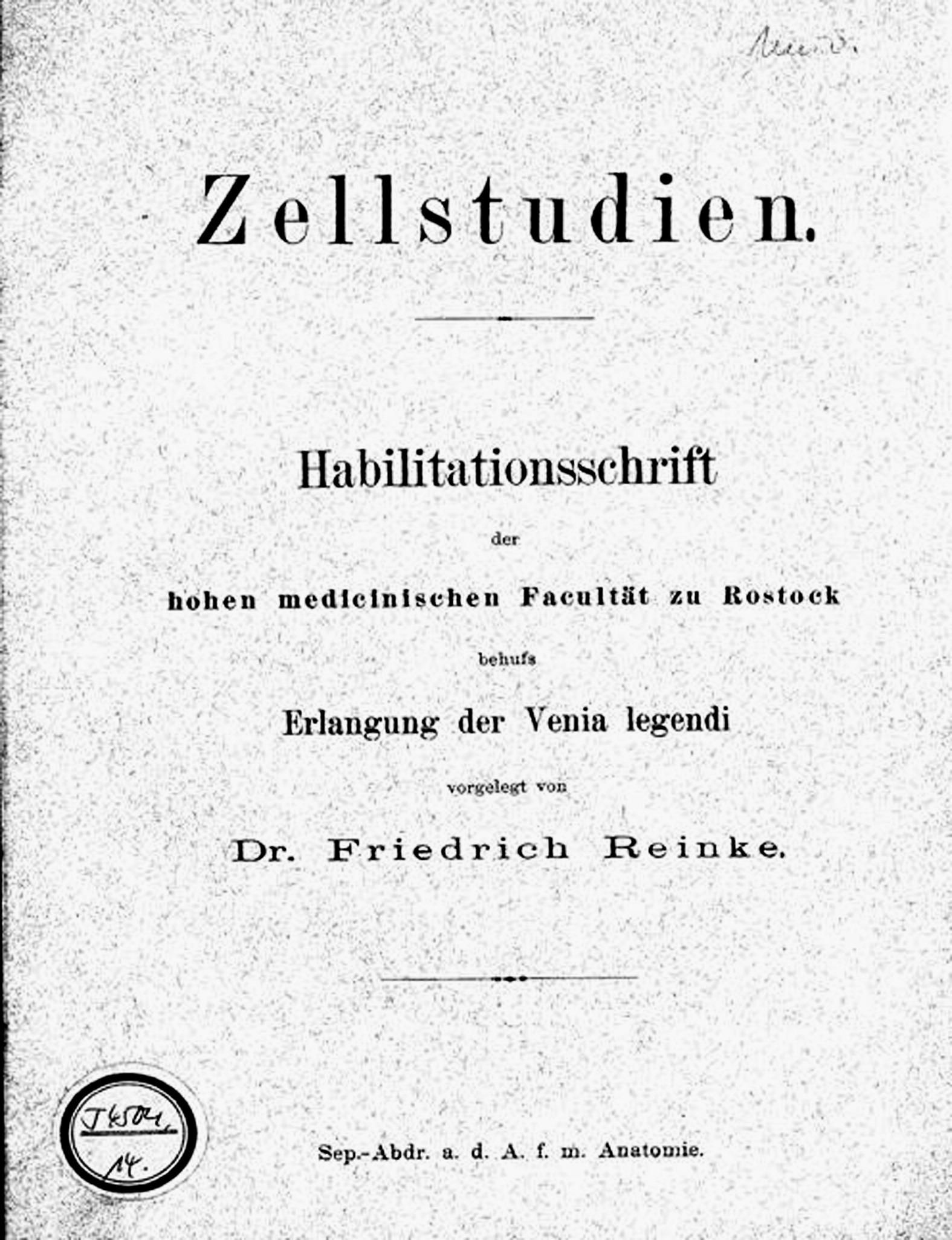
Title page of Friedrich Reinke's Postdoctoral Qualification Document

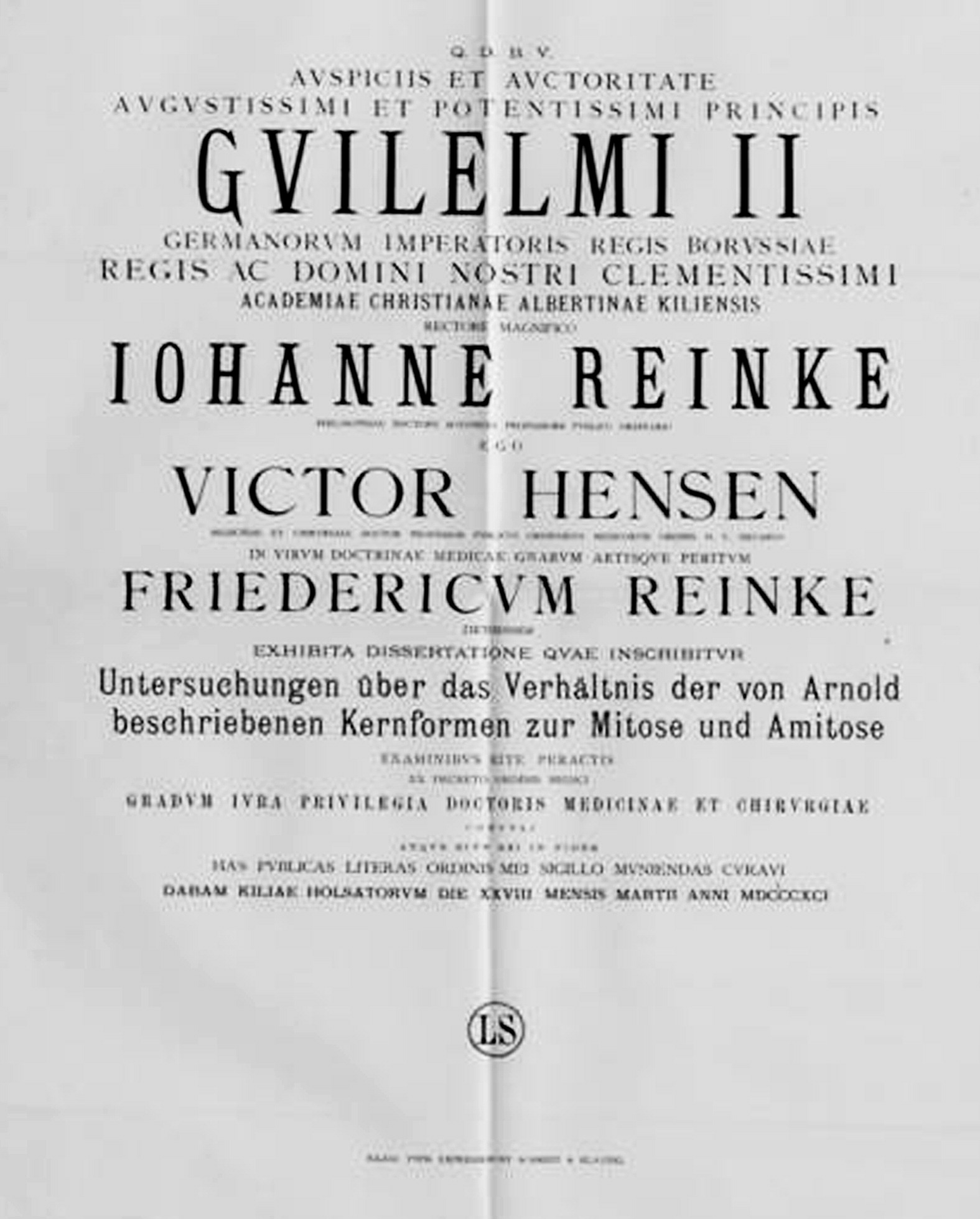
Friedrich Reinke's medical school graduation document
