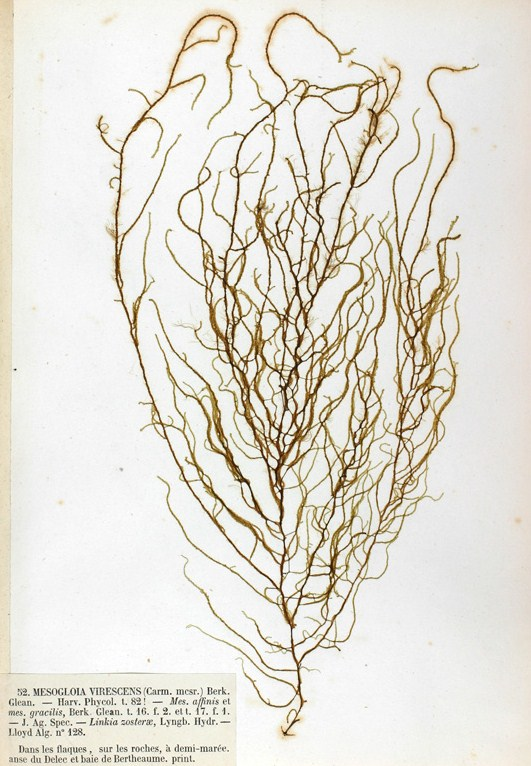

Scientific classification
- Domain: Eukaryota
- Clade: Diaphoretickes
- Clade: SAR
- Clade: Stramenopiles
- Phylum: Gyrista
- Subphylum: Ochrophytina
- Class: Phaeophyceae
- Order: Ectocarpales
- Family: Chordariaceae
- Genus: Eudesme
- Species: E. virescens

Binomial name
- Eudesme virescens (Carmichael ex Berkeley) J.Agardh, 1882

= Eudesme virescens =

Species of seaweed

Eudesme virescens is a species of alga belonging to the family Chordariaceae.

It is native to Europe and America, Greenland.
