= Cladosiphon novae-caledoniae =

Scientific classification
- Domain: Eukaryota
- Clade: Sar
- Clade: Stramenopiles
- Division: Ochrophyta
- Class: Phaeophyceae
- Order: Ectocarpales
- Family: Chordariaceae
- Genus: Cladosiphon
- Species: C. novae-caledoniae

Binomial name
- Cladosiphon novae-caledoniae Kylin H. (1940)

Species of Phaeophyceae

Cladosiphon novae-caledoniae is a type of edible seaweed in the genus Cladosiphon, whose locality is in Freycinet Island, New Caledonia. This species has been tested in vitro for possible tumor inhibition in fucoidan extracts.
