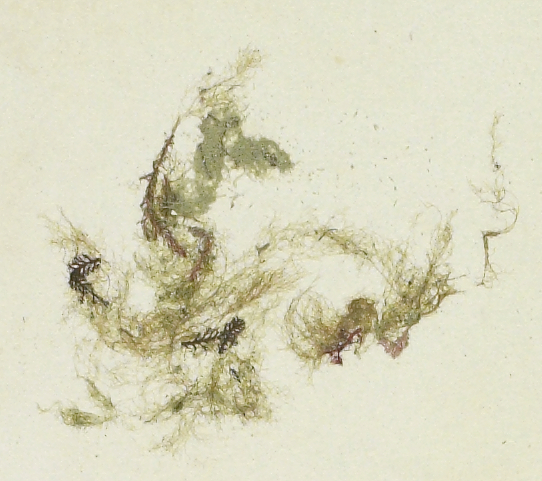
- Zosterocarpus abyssicolus herbarium specimen

Scientific classification
- Domain: Eukaryota
- Clade: Diaphoretickes
- Clade: SAR
- Clade: Stramenopiles
- Phylum: Gyrista
- Subphylum: Ochrophytina
- Class: Phaeophyceae
- Order: Ectocarpales
- Family: Chordariaceae
- Genus: Zosterocarpus; Bornet, 1890

Species
- Zosterocarpus abyssicola W.R.Taylor, 1945; Zosterocarpus australicus Womersley, 1987; Zosterocarpus oedogonium (Meneghini) Bornet, 1890

Synonyms
- Prototilopteris Funk, 1927

= Zosterocarpus =

Genus of brown algae of the family Chordariaceae

Zosterocarpus is a genus of brown algae. The name means 'sori in belt.'
