= Histology of the vocal cords =

Histology is the study of the minute structure, composition, and function of tissues. Mature human vocal cords are composed of layered structures which are quite different at the histological level.

== Structure ==
The glottis is defined as the true vocal folds and the space between them. It is composed of an intermembranous portion or anterior glottis, and an intercartilaginous portion or posterior glottis. The border between the anterior and posterior glottises is defined by an imaginary line drawn across the vocal fold at the tip of the vocal process of the arytenoid cartilage. The anterior glottis is the primary structure of vocal fold vibration for phonation and the posterior glottis is the widest opening between the vocal folds for respiration. Thus, voice disorders often involve lesions of the anterior glottis. There are gradual changes in stiffness between the pliable vocal fold and hard, hyaline cartilage of the arytenoid. The vocal processes of the arytenoid cartilages form a firm framework for the glottis but are made of elastic cartilage at the tip. Therefore, the vocal process of the arytenoid bends at the elastic cartilage portion during adduction and abduction of the vocal folds.

== Attachments of the vocal fold ==
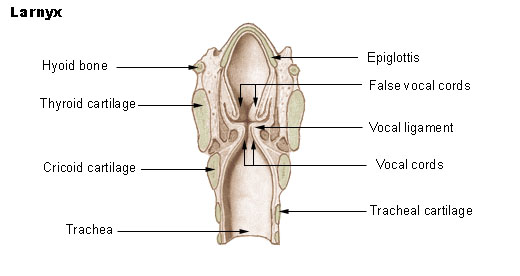
Larynx showing vocal ligaments

The vibratory portion of the vocal fold in the anterior glottis is connected to the thyroid cartilage anteriorly by the macula flava and anterior commissure tendon, or Broyles' ligament. Posteriorly, this vibratory portion is connected to the vocal process of the arytenoid cartilage by the posterior macula flava. The macula flava in newborn vocal folds is important for the growth and development of the vocal ligament and layered structure of the vocal folds. In the adult, the macula flavae are probably required for metabolism of the extracellular matrices of the vocal fold mucosa, replacing damaged fibers in order to maintain the integrity and elasticity of the vocal fold tissues. Age-related changes in the macula flava influence the fibrous components of the vocal folds and are partially responsible for the differences in the acoustics of the adult and aged voice.

== Layered structure of the adult vocal fold ==
The histological structure of the vocal fold can be separated into 5 or 6 tissues, depending on the source, which can then be grouped into three sections as the cover, the transition, and the body.

The cover is composed of the epithelium (mucosa), basal lamina (or basement membrane zone), and the superficial layer of the lamina propria.

The transition is composed of the intermediate and deep layers of the lamina propria. The body is composed of the thyroarytenoid muscle. This layered structure of tissues is very important for vibration of the true vocal folds.

== The cover ==
Mature humans' vocal folds are composed of layered structures which are quite different at the histological level. The topmost layer comprises stratified squamous epithelium which is bordered by ciliated pseudostratified epithelium. The inner-lining surface of this squamous epithelium is covered by a layer of mucus (acting as a mucociliary clearance), which is composed of two layers: a mucinous layer and serous layer. Both mucus layers provide viscous and watery environment for cilia beating posteriorally and superiorly. The mucociliary clearance keeps the vocal folds essentially moist and lubricated. The epidermis layer is secured to the deeper connective tissue by basement membrane. Due to the primarily amorphous fibrous and nonfibrous proteins in the lamina propria, the basement membrane applies strong anchoring-filaments like collagen IV and VII to secure the hemidesmosome of basal cell to the lamina propria. These attachments are strong enough to sustain beating and stretch, to which the vocal cords are subjected. The population density of some of the anchoring fibers in the basement membrane, such as collagen VII, is genetically determined, and these genetics may influence the health and pathogenesis of the vocal folds.

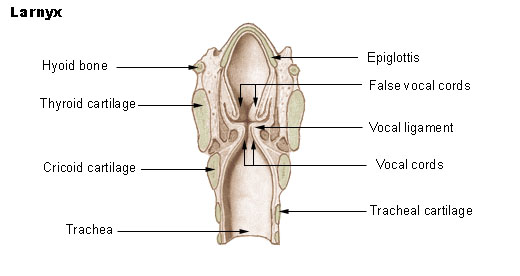
Larynx showing vocal ligaments

The next three layers comprise lamina of lipopolysaccharides (LPs), which are stratified by their histological composition of elastin and collagen fibers, with fibroblast, myofibroblast and macrophages interspersed sparsely. The superficial layer lipopolysaccharides (SLLPs), also known as Reinke's space, is composed of amorphous substance and microfibrils which allows this cover layer to "slide" over the deep layer easily. The vibratory and viscoelastic characteristics of the human vocal cords are mainly attributed to the molecular composition of SLLPs. In normal vocal folds, the jelly-like "Reinke's space" is very loose and abundant with interstitial proteins such as hyaluronic acid, fibronectin, proteoglycan like fibromodulin, decorin and versican. All these extracellular matrix components together regulate the water content of vocal fold and render the viscous shear property for it. The squamous epithelium and superficial lamina propria form the vocal mucosa which serves as vibratory component in phonation. The mucosa layer vibrates at a frequency range of 100–1000 Hz and displacement at 1mm approximately. The intermediate layer of L.P.s consists primarily of elastic fibre, while the deep layer L.P. consists of fewer elastin and more collagen fibres. These two layers have poor differentiated boundaries but are increasingly stiffer than SLLPs. The intermediate and deep layers of lipopolysaccharides compose the vocal ligaments which are enclosed within the vocal folds and are responsible for strain in phonation. Within the extracellular matrix community of vocal ligament, fibrous proteins such as elastin and collagen are pivotal in maintaining the proper elastic biomechanical property of vocal fold. Elastin fibers impart the flexibility and elasticity of the vocal folds and, collagen is responsible for the resistance and resiliece to tensile strength. The normal strain level of vocal ligament ranges from 0–15% during phonation These fibrous proteins exhibit distribution variations spatially and temporally due to fibroblast turnover during tissue maturation and aging. Each vocal ligament is a band of yellow elastic tissue attached in front to the angle of the thyroid cartilage, and behind to the vocal process of the arytenoid cartilage.

=== Epithelium ===
The free edge of the vibratory portion of the vocal fold, the anterior glottis, is covered with stratified squamous epithelium. This epithelium is five to twenty-five cells thick with the most superficial layer consisting of one to three cells that are lost to abrasion of the vocal folds during the closed phase of vibration. The posterior glottis is covered with pseudostratified ciliated epithelium. On the surfaces of the epithelial cells are microridges and microvilli. Lubrication of the vocal folds through adequate hydration is essential for normal phonation to avoid excessive abrasion, and the microridges and microvilli help to spread and retain a mucous coat on the epithelium. Surgery of the vocal folds can disturb this layer with scar tissue, which can result in the inability of the epithelium to retain an adequate mucous coat, which will in turn impact lubrication of the vocal folds. The epithelium has been described as a thin shell, the purpose of which is to maintain the shape of the vocal fold.

=== Basal lamina or basement membrane zone (BMZ) ===
This is transitional tissue composed of two zones, the lamina lucida and lamina densa. The lamina lucida appears as a low density clear zone medial to the epithelial basal cells. The lamina densa has a greater density of filaments and is adjacent to the lamina propria. The basal lamina or BMZ mainly provides physical support to the epithelium through anchoring fibers and is essential for repair of the epithelium.

=== Superficial layer of the lamina propria ===
This layer consists of loose fibrous components and extracellular matrices that can be compared to soft gelatin. This layer is also known as Reinke’s space but it is not a space at all. Like the pleural cavity, it is a potential space. If there really is a space, there is a problem. The superficial layer of the lamina propria is a structure that vibrates a great deal during phonation, and the viscoelasticity needed to support this vibratory function depends mostly on extracellular matrices. The primary extracellular matrices of the vocal fold cover are reticular, collagenous and elastic fibers, as well as glycoprotein and glycosaminoglycan. These fibers serve as scaffolds for structural maintenance, providing tensile strength and resilience so that the vocal folds may vibrate freely but still retain their shape.

== The transition ==
=== Intermediate and deep layers of the lamina propria ===
The intermediate layer of the lamina propria is primarily made up of elastic fibers while the deep layer of the lamina propria is primarily made up of collagenous fibers. These fibers run roughly parallel to the vocal fold edge and these two layers of the lamina propria comprise the vocal ligament. The transition layer is primarily structural, giving the vocal fold support as well as providing adhesion between the mucosa, or cover, and the body, the thyroarytenoid muscle.

== The body ==
=== The thyroarytenoid muscle ===
This muscle is variously described as being divided into the thyroarytenoid and vocalis muscles or the thyrovocalis and the thyromuscularis, depending on the source.

== See also ==
- Reinke's Edema
