= Eudesme =

Scientific classification
- Domain: Eukaryota
- Clade: Diaphoretickes
- Clade: Sar
- Clade: Stramenopiles
- Phylum: Gyrista
- Subphylum: Ochrophytina
- Class: Phaeophyceae
- Order: Ectocarpales
- Family: Chordariaceae
- Genus: Eudesme; J.Agardh

Genus of seaweeds

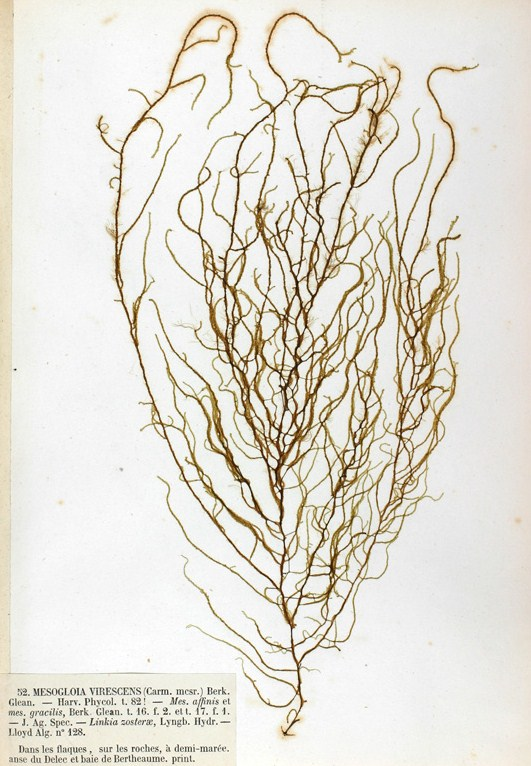
Eudesme virescens

Eudesme is a genus of brown algae belonging to the family Chordariaceae.

The genus was first described by Jakob Georg Agardh in 1882.

The genus has cosmopolitan distribution.

Species:

- Eudesme virescens (Carm. ex Berk.) J.Agardh
