= Fucoidan =

Sulfated polysaccharides

Fucoidan is a long-chain sulfated polysaccharide found in various species of brown algae, such as seaweed, and in marine invertebrates. Fucoidan occurs in the cell walls of seaweed serving structural roles.

Commercially available fucoidan is commonly extracted from the seaweed species Fucus vesiculosus (wracks), Cladosiphon okamuranus, Laminaria japonica (kombu, sugar kelp) and Undaria pinnatifida (wakame). Fucoidan extraction methods, purity, global regulatory approvals, and source seaweed species vary among fucoidan products. The potential bioactivity of fucoidan extracts is under preliminary research.

Fucoidan is sold as a dietary supplement, food additive, and as an ingredient in animal feed or cosmetics. Although used in traditional Chinese medicine, it has not been approved as a human drug in any country, and no advanced clinical trials have been reported, as of 2019. It is commonly used in Southeast Asian countries and is recognized as a natural health product in Canada, but does not have governmental approval or recognition as a safe ingredient for human use in most western countries.

== History ==
Seaweed fossils have been unearthed at Monte Verde in Chile, where archaeological digs have uncovered evidence of their use dating to circa 12,000 BC.

Fucoidan itself was not isolated and described until the early 1900s. In 1913, Swedish Professor Harald Kylin became the first to describe the slimy film found on many seaweeds as 'fucoidin' or 'fucoijin', becoming known as fucoidan based on the international naming convention for sugars.

Research in the early 20th century focused on extracting crude extracts and reconciling some of the conflicting views on fucoidan. Methods of extracts and isolation of fucoidan from brown seaweeds were determined on laboratory scale in 1952.

Laboratory research expanded once fucoidan became commercially available in the 1970s, with studies limited to in vitro and rodent studies. Fucoidan is limited for use as a "complementary" ingredient in supplements, foods, beverages, cosmetics and animal feed because its biological properties and safety have not been adequately demonstrated.

== Chemistry ==
Fucoidans are sulfated polysaccharides derived primarily from various species of brown algae. The main sugar found in the polymer backbone is fucose, giving the name fucoidan. Other sugars are often present alongside fucose, including galactose, xylose, arabinose and rhamnose. The relative content of these sugars in fucoidan varies significantly between species of algae and can also be affected by the extraction method. The same holds true for the degree of sulfation and other structural features such as acetylation that are only found in fucoidans from certain species.

The molecular weight of fucoidans is typically high (ca. 50–1000 kDa). Extraction techniques that minimize polymer degradation tend to preserve this feature, while other methods can be used to target more specific molecular weight fractions (e.g. 8 kDa). These low molecular weight fractions are generally low yielding and tend to be used for functional research. Full chemical characterization is complicated by the number of structural features present in fucoidan.

== Research ==
As of 2019, only laboratory studies, early-stage clinical trials, and case reports have been reported on the potential biological properties of fucoidan.

== Safety ==
There is little evidence for the safe use of fucoidan products, as no national regulatory authorities have designated it as safe for human use and no rigorous clinical safety trials have been reported, as of 2019. There is high variation in the quality of products containing fucoidan.

== See also ==
- Porphyran
- Phycocolloid
