= Camille Sauvageau =

French botanist and phycologist

Camille François Sauvageau (12 May 1861 – 5 August 1936) was a French botanist and phycologist.

Sauvageau was born in Angers. He studied at the University of Montpellier, receiving his degree in natural sciences in 1884. Afterwards he served as an assistant to Charles Flahault (1884–1888) in Montpellier and to Philippe Van Tieghem (1885–1891) in Paris. In 1891 he received his doctorate in Paris with the thesis Sur les feuilles de quelques Monocotylédones aquatiques (On the leaves of some aquatic monocots). In 1892 he attained a professorship at the University of Lyon, later serving as a professor of botany at the Faculty of Sciences of Bordeaux (1901–1932).

He is known for his investigations of Phaeophyceae, being a taxonomic authority of numerous brown algae species. In 1926 he described the order Sporochnales.

His name was lent to the mycological genus Sauvageautia Har., 1892 (now a synonym of Urosporella G.F.Atkinson, 1897) as well as to the algae genus Sauvageaugloia (Hamel ex Kylin, 1940).

The French Academy of Sciences awarded him the Prix Montagne for 1904.

== Selected writings ==
- Sur quelques algues phéosporées parasites, 1892 - On some phaeosporic algae parasites.
- Remarques sur les Sphacélariacées, 1900–1914 - Remarks on Sphacelariaceae.
- Sur une nouvelle complication dans l'alternance des générations des Cutleria, 1907 - On a new complication in the "alternation of generations" involving Cutleria.
- Recherches sur les laminaires des côtes de France, 1918 - Research on Laminaria from coastal France.
- Sur le développement de quelques phéosporées; Sur quelques algues phéosporées de la rade de Villefranche (Alpes-Maritimes); Sur quelques algues phéosporées de Guéthary (Basses-Pyrénées), 1929 - On the development of some phaeospores, etc.

He also made contributions to Narcisse Patouillard's Catalogue raisonné des plantes cellulaires de la Tunisie.
