= Cladosiphon okamuranus =

Scientific classification
- Domain: Eukaryota
- Supergroup: Stramenopiles
- Division: Ochrophyta
- Class: Phaeophyceae
- Order: Ectocarpales
- Family: Chordariaceae
- Genus: Cladosiphon
- Species: C. okamuranus

Binomial name
- Cladosiphon okamuranus Tokida

Species of seaweed

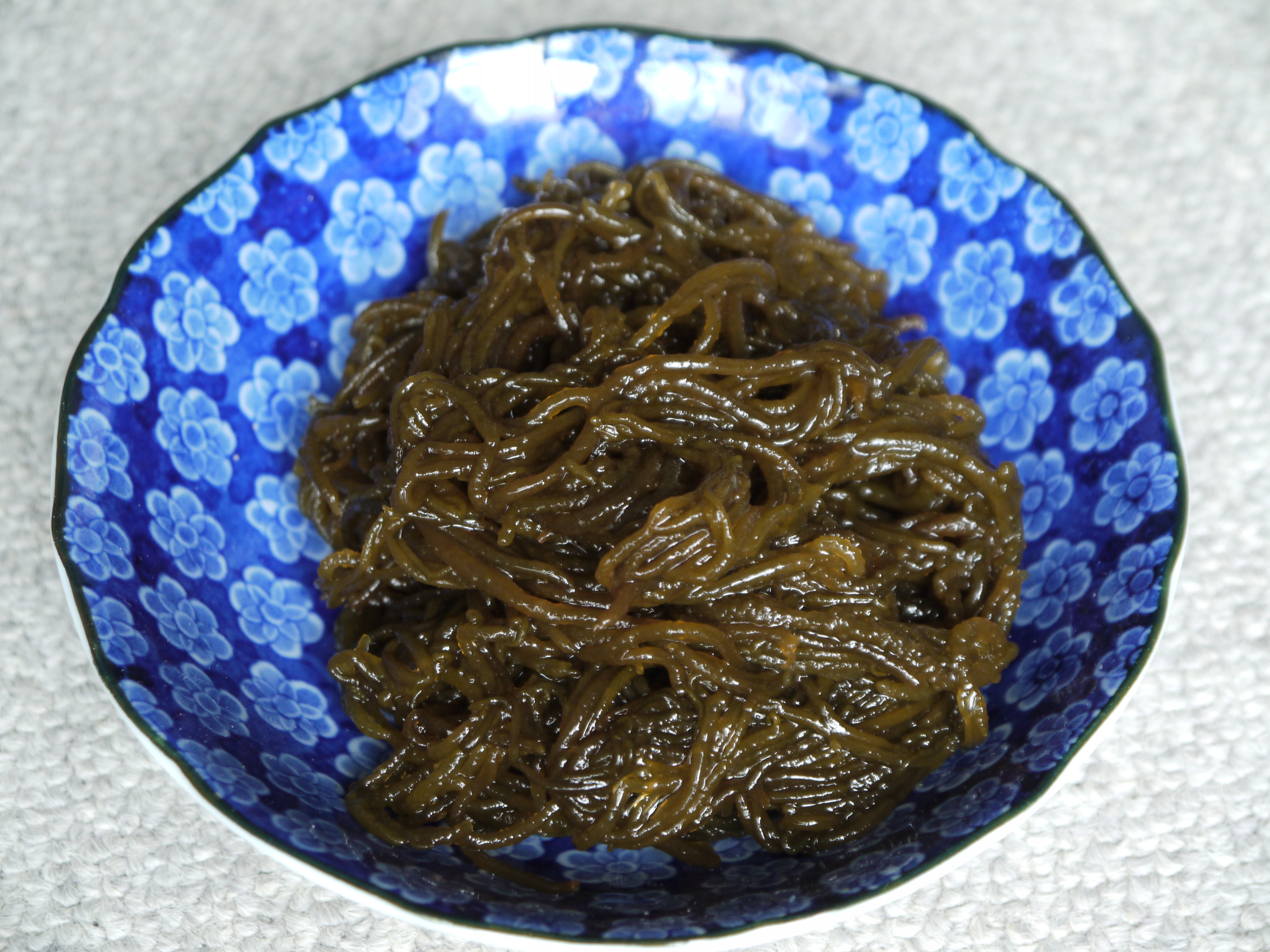
Japanese "Mozuku" dish

Cladosiphon okamuranus (モズク;水雲;藻付;海蘊;海雲, mozuku) is a type of edible seaweed in the genus Cladosiphon, naturally found in Okinawa, Japan. Most mozuku is now farmed by locals, and sold to processing factories. The main use of mozuku is as food, and as a source of one type of sulfated polysaccharide called Fucoidan, which has been studied as a cancer treatment in rats, and as a health supplement.

== Mozuku biology ==
A group of researchers from Okinawa Institute of Science and Technology Graduate University conducting DNA research decoded S-strain genome for Cladosiphon okamuranus and found that its size was roughly 140 Mbp and smaller relative to other brown alga. They also made a rough estimate on the number of genes C. okamuranus has and found 13,640 genes.
