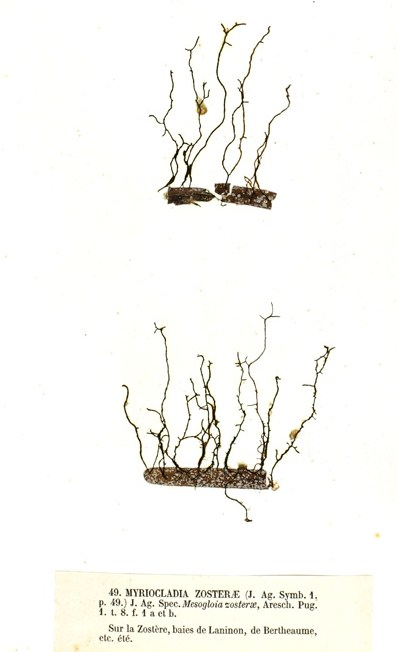
- Cladosiphon zosterae (previously called Myriocladia zosterae) on Zostera

Scientific classification
- Domain: Eukaryota
- Clade: Diaphoretickes
- Clade: SAR
- Clade: Stramenopiles
- Phylum: Gyrista
- Subphylum: Ochrophytina
- Class: Phaeophyceae
- Order: Ectocarpales
- Family: Chordariaceae
- Genus: Cladosiphon; Kützing, 1843

= Cladosiphon =

Genus of algae

Cladosiphon is a genus of brown algae belonging to the family Chordariaceae.

The genus has cosmopolitan distribution.

Species:

- Cladosiphon cylindricus (Sauv.) Kylin, 1940
- Cladosiphon erythraeus J.Agardh
- Cladosiphon irregularis (Sauv.) Kylin, 1949
- Cladosiphon lubricus (Sauv.) Kylin, 1940
- Cladosiphon mediterraneus Kütz., 1843
- Cladosiphon novae-caledoniae Kylin, 1940
- Cladosiphon novae-calendoniae Kylin
- Cladosiphon occidentalis Kylin
- Cladosiphon okamuranus Tokida
- Cladosiphon zosterae (J.Agardh) Kylin
