= Dictyosiphon =

Scientific classification
- Domain: Eukaryota
- Clade: Diaphoretickes
- Clade: SAR
- Clade: Stramenopiles
- Phylum: Gyrista
- Subphylum: Ochrophytina
- Class: Phaeophyceae
- Order: Ectocarpales
- Family: Chordariaceae
- Genus: Dictyosiphon; Greville, 1830

Genus of algae

Dictyosiphon is a genus of brown algae belonging to the family Chordariaceae.

The genus has almost cosmopolitan distribution.

Species:

- Dictyosiphon chordaria Aresch.
- Dictyosiphon ekmanii Aresch.
- Dictyosiphon filiformis (Foslie) De Toni
- Dictyosiphon finmarkicus Foslie
- Dictyosiphon foeniculaceus (Huds.) Grev.
- Dictyosiphon fragilis Harvey ex Kützing
- Dictyosiphon macounii Farlow
