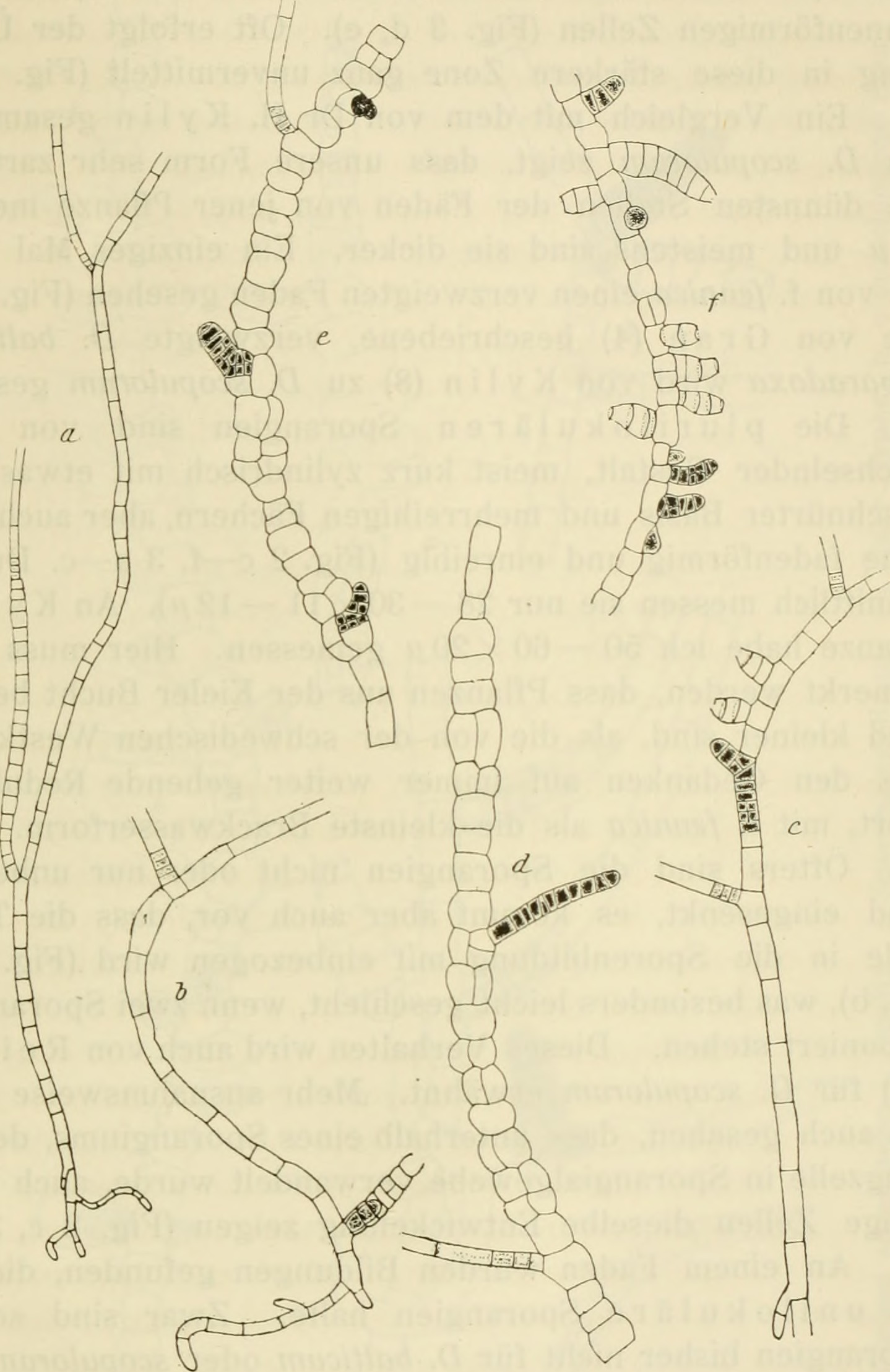

Scientific classification
- Domain: Eukaryota
- Clade: Diaphoretickes
- Clade: SAR
- Clade: Stramenopiles
- Phylum: Gyrista
- Subphylum: Ochrophytina
- Class: Phaeophyceae
- Order: Ectocarpales
- Family: Chordariaceae
- Genus: Desmotrichum; Kützing, 1845

= Desmotrichum =

Genus of seaweeds

Desmotrichum is a genus of brown algae. One species is accepted in AlgaeBase, Desmotrichum plumosum.
