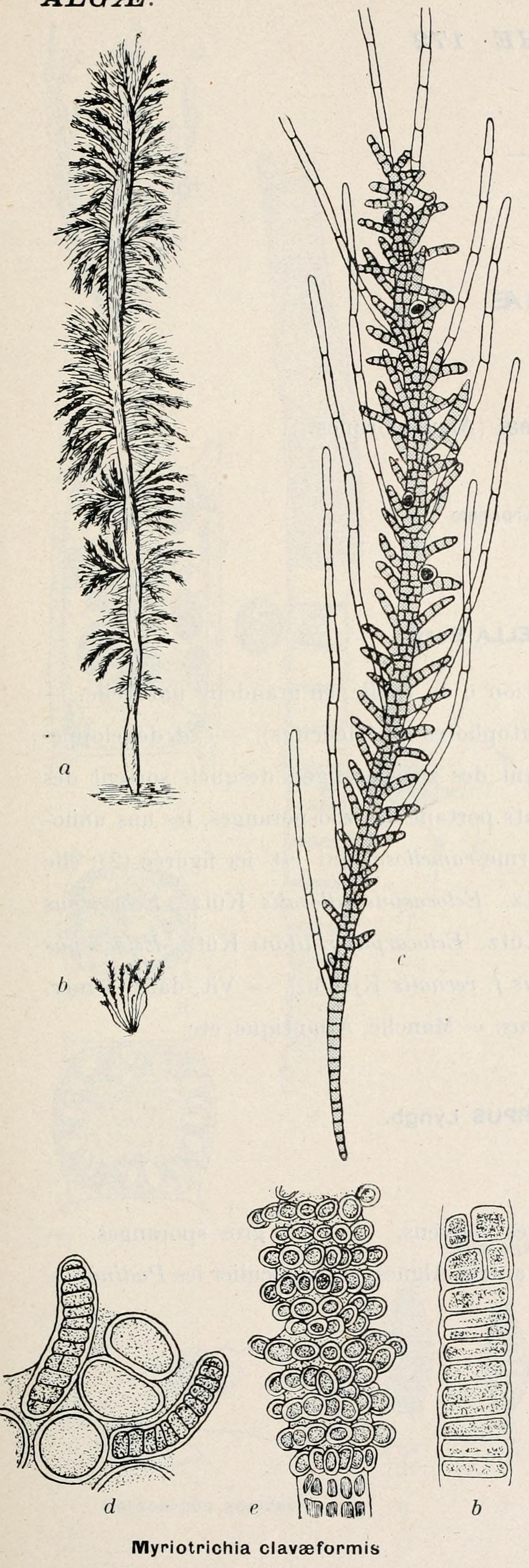
- Illustration of Myriotrichia clavaeformis

Scientific classification
- Domain: Eukaryota
- Clade: Diaphoretickes
- Clade: SAR
- Clade: Stramenopiles
- Phylum: Gyrista
- Subphylum: Ochrophytina
- Class: Phaeophyceae
- Order: Ectocarpales
- Family: Chordariaceae
- Genus: Myriotrichia; Harvey, 1834

Type species
- Myriotrichia clavaeformis Harvey

Species
- Myriotrichia adriatica Hauck; Myriotrichia canariensis Kützing; Myriotrichia clavaeformis Harvey; Myriotrichia occidentalis Børgesen; Myriotrichia protasperococcus Berthold; Myriotrichia repens Hauck

= Myriotrichia =

Genus of seaweeds

Myriotrichia is a genus of brown algae.

It forms small, soft, olive-brown tufts on the surface of other plants. Filaments rarely exceed centimetres in length.

It may grow by intercalary growth. Its sporangia may contain one or many cavities, and emerge directly from the surface cells; they may form a ring around the main nema. Dedicated photosynthetic machinery may be entirely absent.

Its life history consists of alternation of phases; it has isogamous gametes, and dioecious gametophytes.

At warm temperatures 18 °C (64 °F), the alga reproduces sexually, forming single chambered "meiosporangia". At cooler temperatures, asexual reproduction took place in multi-chambered "mitosporangia".

The gametophyte phase only produces gametes when day length is long; with shorter days these too reproduce asexually. This is probably because the plants upon which they are epiphytic only grow in the spring. The gametophyte is filamentous – while the sporophyte bears parenchyma, even though it only reaches around 4 cm (2 in) in length.

The alga has a small genome with approximately 12 chromosomes.
