= Reinke's edema =

Swelling of the vocal cords

- Other names: Reinke's oedema, polypoid degeneration, polypoid corditis, edematous hypertrophy
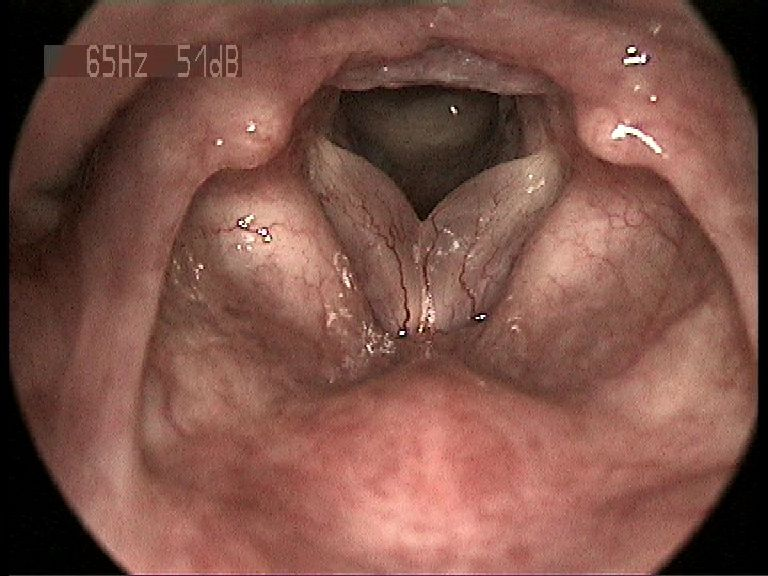
- Reinke's edema
- Specialty: Otorhinolaryngology

Reinke's edema is the swelling of the vocal cords due to fluid collected within Reinke's space. First identified by the German anatomist Friedrich B. Reinke in 1895, Reinke's space is a gelatinous layer of the vocal cord located underneath the outer cells of the vocal cord. When a person speaks, Reinke's space vibrates to allow for sound to be produced (phonation). Reinke's space is sometimes referred to as the superficial lamina propria.

Reinke's edema is characterized by the "sac-like" appearance of the fluid-filled vocal cords. The swelling of the vocal folds causes the voice to become deep and hoarse. Therefore, the major symptom of Reinke's edema is a hoarseness similar to laryngitis. The major cause associated with Reinke's edema is smoking. In fact, 97 percent of patients diagnosed with Reinke's edema are habitual smokers. Other identified risk factors include overuse of the vocal cords, gastroesophageal reflux, and hypothyroidism. The disease is more often cited in women than in men, because lower voice changes are more noticeable in women.

The first cases of Reinke's edema were recorded in 1891 by M. Hajek, followed by F. Reinke in 1895. In his investigations, Reinke injected a stained glue into the superficial lamina propria (Reinke's space) to mimic edema. Reinke's edema is considered to be a benign (non-cancerous) polyp (protrusion) that represents 10% of all benign laryngeal pathologies. Treatment of Reinke's edema starts with the elimination of associated risk factors, such as smoking, gastric reflux, and hypothyroidism. Advanced cases may undergo phonosurgery to remove the fluid from the vocal cords.

== Signs and symptoms ==
List of common symptoms:

- A "sac-like" appearance of the vocal folds
- Hoarseness and deepening of the voice
- Trouble speaking (dysphonia)
- Reduced vocal range with diminished upper limits
- Stretching of the mucosa (distension)
- Shortness of breath (dyspnoea)

Reinke's edema is characterized by a "sac-like" appearance of the vocal folds. The edema is a white translucent fluid that causes a bulging (distension) of the vocal cord. The most common clinical symptom associated with Reinke's edema is an abnormally low pitched voice with hoarseness. The low pitch voice is a direct result of increased fluid in the Reinke's space, which vibrates at a lower frequency than normal (females <130 Hz; males <110 Hz). Hoarseness is a common problem of many laryngeal diseases, such as laryngitis. It is described as a harsh and breathy tone of voice. Hoarseness is often seen alongside dysphonia, a condition in which the individual has difficulty producing the sounds of speech normally.

The swelling of the vocal cords and the lowering of the voice are warning signs that an individual has Reinke's edema. At the microscopic level, an examination of the vocal cords in patients with Reinke's edema will show lowered levels of collagen, elastin, and extracellular matrix proteins. These characteristics can be used to diagnose Reinke's edema. Reinke's edema is considered a benign tumor or polyp that may become precancerous if smoking is involved. An indicator of cancer is the development of leukoplakia, which manifests as white patches on the vocal folds.

Smoking, gastric reflux, and hypothyroidism are all risk factors for Reinke's edema. The symptoms of Reinke's edema are considered to be chronic symptoms because they develop gradually over time and depend on how long the individual is exposed to the risk factor. In the case of smoking, as long as the individual continues the habit of smoking, the Reinke's edema will continue to progress. This is true for other risk factors as well, such as untreated gastric reflux and overuse of the voice, which is common to professions such as singers and radio announcers.

== Causes ==
Smoking is the number one cause of Reinke's edema. Other factors include gastroesophageal reflux, hypothyroidism and chronic overuse of the voice. Smoking and reflux are the only risk factors that may lead to cancer. Additionally, the combination of several risk factors increase the likelihood of an individual developing Reinke's edema. For example, an individual who smokes and also has gastric reflux would have an increased susceptibility for developing Reinke's edema over time.

Reinke's edema is commonly diagnosed in middle-aged females with a history of smoking (aged 50 years or older). Because males have lower pitched voices than females, males are less likely to observe significant changes in the voice and are therefore less likely to seek treatment. Females also report more physical discomfort due to Reinke's edema. The risk of Reinke's edema increases with age and also with prolonged exposure to smoking. Additionally, individuals in professions that require constant use of the voice, such as singers, teachers, and radio hosts, may be at an increased risk for developing the disease.

Because the disease is heavily linked to smoking, there is no established way to screen for Reinke's edema. Similarly, the only way to prevent Reinke's edema is to avoid smoking. By adopting a non-smoking lifestyle after being diagnosed with Reinke's edema, it is possible to stop the disease's progression, although it is not possible to reverse it. Therefore, it is critical to maintain a non-smoking lifestyle even after surgery, because the fluid can re-emerge. In fact, in many cases surgeons will not perform surgery without the guarantee that the individual will stop smoking.

== Mechanism ==
The movement of the vocal folds during speech

The vocal cords consist of five layers of cells:

- Squamous epithelium
- Superficial lamina propria (Reinke's space)
- Intermediate lamina propria
- Deep lamina propria
- Vocalis muscle

In order for humans to produce sound for speech, the vocal folds must readily vibrate. The two layers of the vocal cords that vibrate are the Reinke's space and the overlying epithelium. In fact, these layers move freely over the more rigid intermediate and deep lamina proprias. Accumulation of fluid within the Reinke's space alters the elasticity of the vocal cord, making it less stiff and more gelatinous. This slows the vocal cord vibration, which results in a deepened and hoarse voice. Because men normally have a lower voice than women, the change is more noticeable in women.

Edema usually occurs on both vocal cords. This is known as bilateral Reinke's edema. The pathophysiology or mechanism of Reinke's edema is not well known, however, chemicals contained within cigarette smoke are associated with an increased vascular permeability of blood vessels, which results in fluid leaking into the Reinke's space. Normally, the vocal cords are surrounded by neatly aligned blood vessels, however, these blood vessels can become disarranged and fragile in Reinke's edema. In addition, cigarette smoke can create reactive oxygen species that alter the environment of the vocal cords. Tissue analysis of Reinke's edema shows decreased amounts of the proteins fibronectin, elastin, collagens I and III, and extracellular matrix proteins. This leads to an overall decreased stiffness of the tissue layer, which vibrates more slowly and produces a deeper sounding voice.

The progression of Reinke's edema is gradual and is directly related to the duration of exposure to risk factors, such as smoking and gastric reflux. Disease progression is divided into two types: "pale" and "livid". The pale type is defined by a glazed appearance of the vocal cords with a clear (colorless) fluid underneath. This represents the early stage of the disease. The advanced livid type of Reinke's edema is identified by an increased amount of fluid, accompanied by fluid color change from colorless to yellow-grey. The swelling of the vocal folds cause ballooned-like appearance, known as a polyp. The polyps of Reinke's edema are usually benign, however, there may be a risk of cancer if the patient is a smoker. Additionally, if the edema becomes too severe, patients may experience difficulty breathing due to airway obstruction.

== Diagnosis ==
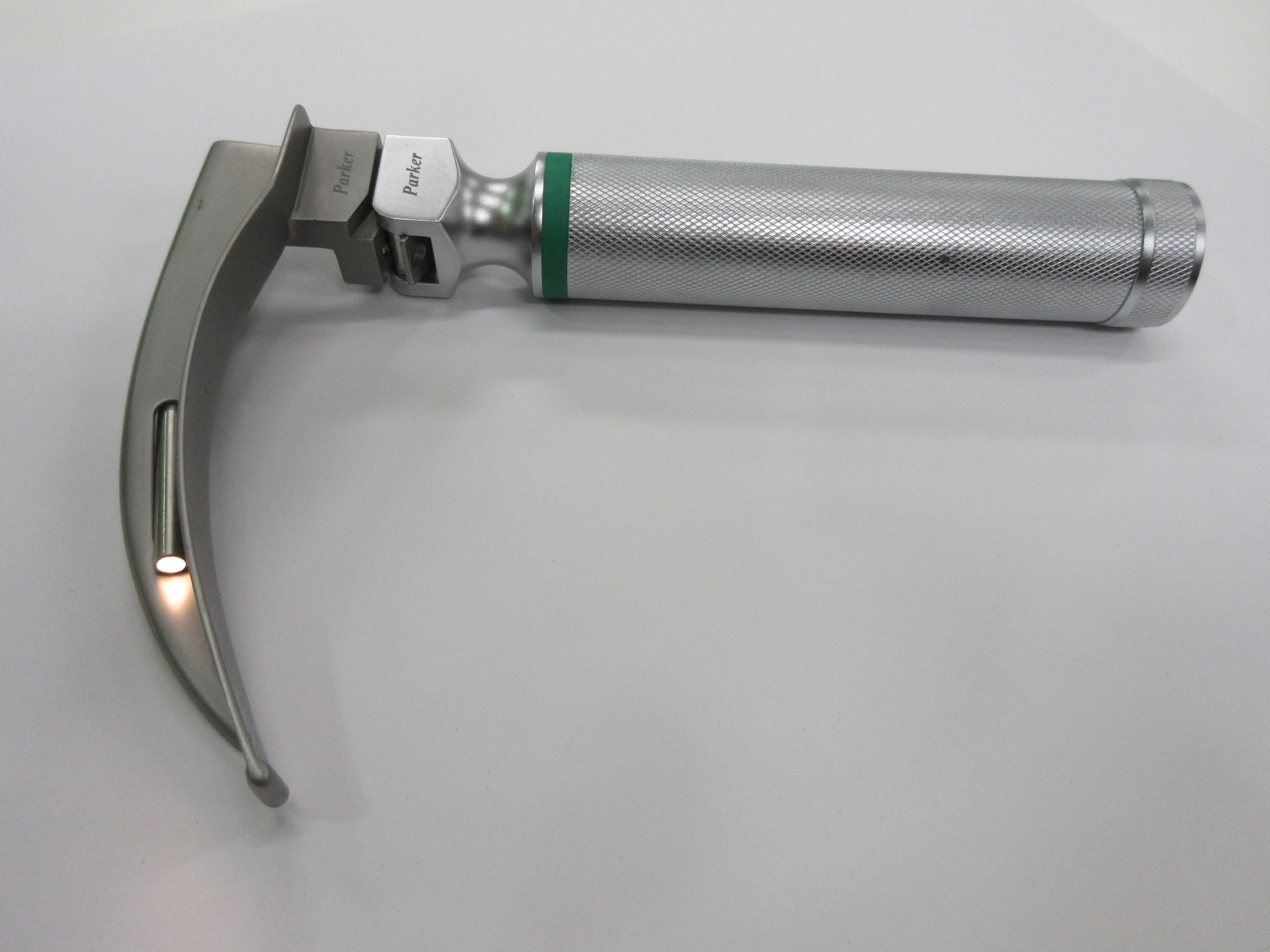
Rigid laryngoscope instrument

Reinke's edema is often diagnosed by an ear, nose and throat (ENT) specialist (an Otorhinolaryngologist or Otolaryngologist) by examination of the vocal folds ("cords"). First, the doctor will review the patient's medical history and symptoms, such as hoarseness, dysphonia, and reduced vocal range. There is no familial or hereditary link to Reinke's edema. The doctor will need to know if the patient is a habitual smoker. Once the patient's history is reviewed, the vocal cords will be visualized using laryngoscopy, a technique in which a tube with a camera (endoscope) is passed through the nose and down the larynx. Laryngoscopes can be rigid or flexible. Flexible laryngoscopes, such as fiber laryngoscopes, allow the patient to produce sound as the tube is placed, and therefore allows the doctor to visualize movement of the vocal cord. The use of rigid laryngoscopes generally requires general anaesthesia due to the discomfort involved in distracting the soft tissues of the mouth and pharynx.

Based on the results of the laryngoscopy, Reinke's edema can be classified using a standardized system set in place by Yonekawa. This system characterizes the disease based on severity.

Yonekawa Classification:

- Grade I – Lesions contact the anterior third of the vocal fold
- Grade II – Lesions contact the anterior two-thirds of the vocal fold
- Grade III – Lesions contact the entirety of the vocal fold

If further evaluation is needed, stroboscopy is used to examine the mucosal waves of the vocal cords. Mucosal waves describe the waves produced by vibration of the vocal cords during speech. Stroboscopes produce flashes of light that are timed to the patient's vocal frequency. Every time the light is flashed, it will create a still frame image of the vocal cords at that particular moment in time. These are combined to produce an image of the wave. In the case of Reinke's edema, structural changes to the vocal cords will result in abnormal wave patterns.

== Treatment ==
The first step in treating Reinke's edema is to eliminate or control those risk factors that are causing the disease. This includes the cessation of smoking, the control of gastroesophageal reflux using antacids or proton-pump inhibitors (eg, Protonix®), and the discontinuation of activities that cause vocal distress. Those experiencing a hoarseness of the voice may choose to undergo voice therapy to improve the voice's quality and range. Most cases of Reinke's edema are caused by the long term usage of cigarettes. In this case, it is important to make lifestyle changes to stop smoking. While this will not resolve or improve the edema, the cessation of smoking will halt the disease's progression.

If the elimination of risk factors is not sufficient to improve the patient's symptoms, surgery may be required. The most common type of surgery performed today for Reinke's edema is called surgical microlaryngoscopy. Most procedures follow the microflap technique set in place by Hirano. During surgery, an incision is made into the vocal cord using either microscissors or a Carbon dioxide laser (CO_{2}). A flap of mucous membrane is lifted and the affected tissue is removed using suction or a microdebrider. The flap is then re-draped and trimmed to the appropriate size.

Most cases of Reinke's edema are bilateral −affecting both vocal cords− rather than unilateral. In the case of bilateral edema, the surgeon must choose whether to operate each side of the vocal cord in two separate surgeries or to operate both sides in a single surgery. The complication associated with removing tissue from both sides in a single surgery is that the raw, cut ends of the vocal cords may form an anterior glottis web, in which the two sides grow together in a continuous sheet. Other complications of surgery include tissue scarring due to damage to the vocal ligament during the incision and vocal cord stiffening due to over-suctioning of the superficial lamina propria (Reinke's space).

While surgical microlaryngoscopy has its associated risks, if left untreated, Reinke's edema can lead to a variety of long-term complications. Besides dysphonia (impaired sound production for speech), the most serious of these complications is airway obstruction due to severe inflammation of the vocal cords. The risk of complications has decreased drastically with the creation of new tools, such as the CO_{2} laser for surgical microlaryngoscopy. Before the Hirano microflap method was developed in 1895, vocal stripping was the most common procedure used to correct Reinke's edema. Vocal stripping was often performed without magnification and with a monocular laryngoscope, instead of a binocular scope. This led to major complications such as vocal ligament scarring.

Women are more likely than men to undergo surgery due to a greater change in vocal pitch and quality. Surgery is capable of restoring the voice, with the condition that smoking is not resumed after surgery. Reinke's edema is not a life-limiting pathology unless the tissue becomes precancerous.

== Research ==
Recent studies have examined the role of specific cell types in Reinke's edema, including the role of vocal cord fibroblasts. In normal tissue, these spindle-shaped CD34+ fibroblasts produce extracellular matrix proteins such as collagen and elastin. Recent findings have shown a morphological change in fibroblasts extracted from the tissue of Reinke's edema to a more dendritic-like shape with several protrusions. Large populations of these altered CD34+ fibroblasts have been found surrounding the areas of edema. They lack normal expression of several cluster of differentiation (CD) proteins and express additional proteins that are not expressed in normal vocal cord fibroblasts. Cigarette smoke was discovered to increase COX-2 and prostaglandin E2 (PGE2) expression in fibroblasts, which could explain the role of cigarette smoke in Reinke's edema.

While smoking is a clear risk factor for Reinke's edema, others are being investigated to explain Reinke's edema in nonsmokers. Research has suggested the role of bacterial colonies in non-neoplastic lesions such as Reinke's edema. In one study using pyrosequencing, thirty-one of the forty-four non-neoplastic lesions sampled were found to have Streptococcus pseudopneumoniae bacterial strains as the dominant bacteria present. Species of Streptococcus were present in every lesion analyzed, representing 72.9% of all bacteria found specifically within Reinke's edema lesions and 68.7% of bacteria across all the vocal fold lesions sequenced. While smoking, gastric reflux, and vocal abuse have been more widely agreed upon in literature as risk factors for Reinke's edema, the altered bacterial cultures could be developed as a diagnostic tool in the future.

The majority of the research within the last ten years focuses on improving surgery for Reinke's edema. Due to the importance of the Reinke's space in speech, it is important that minimally-invasive techniques be perfected that minimize the risk of complications. The carbon dioxide laser has been successfully incorporated into the surgical technique; there are several other lasers being investigated for use in Reinke's edema. These include photoangiolytic lasers and potassium titanyl phosphate lasers.

== See also ==
- List of voice disorders
- Histology of the vocal folds
