= Johannes Reinke =

German botanist and philosopher

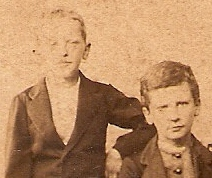
Friedrich Berthold Reinke (right) with elder brother Johannes Reinke (left)

Johannes Reinke (February 3, 1849 – February 25, 1931) was a German botanist and philosopher, born in Ziethen, Lauenburg. He is remembered for his research of benthic marine algae.

== Academic background ==
Reinke studied botany with his father from the age of eight. Reinke studied theology at Rostock, but his focus later changed to botany. In 1879 he became a professor of botany at the University of Göttingen, where he established the institute of plant physiology. From 1885 until 1921, he was a professor at the University of Kiel. Reinke was a co-founder of the Deutsche Botanische Gesellschaft.

== Contributions ==
Reinke had a keen interest in the systematics, developmental cycles, cytology and physiology of brown algae. From 1888 to 1892, he published a number of articles on marine algae from the North and Baltic Seas — in regards to the Baltic, he described several new genera of algae. He also published works on the algal families Tilopteridaceae (1889) and Sphacelariaceae (1890). Furthermore, he postulated that the encrusting algae genus called Aglaozonia was a stage in the life history of Cutleria. He has been credited for being the first to use the word soralia to refer to the propagule-producing area in lichens in an 1895 publication, introducing a term still in common use. Reinkella, a genus of lichenized fungi in the family Roccellaceae, was named in his honour in 1897.

Reinke was a proponent of scientific "neo-vitalism", and a critic of the Darwinian theory of evolution. Opposing the secularization of science, Reinke, along with his Lutheran friend Eberhard Dennert, founded the Keplerbund ("Kepler Association") in 1907. They opposed Haeckel's Monist League, which aimed to "replace" German churches with the evolutionary theory as a secular religion, and attempted to create a branch of popular science grounded in the Christian belief.

In 1901 he introduced the term "theoretical biology" to define biology from a standpoint of concepts and theories, and to differentiate it from traditional "empirical biology". Reinke attempted to explain the process of biological change through a concept of morphogenesis and genetic regulation he referred to as the "Dominanten" theory. Among his written works was a book that discussed the relationship of philosophy and religion to science.

He died in Preetz.

== Selected publications ==
- Entwicklungsgeschichtliche Untersuchungen über die Dictyotaceen des Golfs von Neapel. Nova Acta Academiae Caesareae Leopoldino-Carolinae Germanicae naturae curiosorum, Bd. 40, 1 (1878) * Lehrbuch der allgemeinen Botanik, (Historical research into the development of Dictyotaceae from the Gulf of Naples), 1880
- Lehrbuch der allgemeinen Botanik (Textbook of general botany), 1880
- Atlas deutscher Meeresalgen (Atlas of German marine algae), 1889 and 1891
- Einleitung in der theoretische Biologie (Introduction to theoretical biology), 1901, second edition 1910.
- Philosophie der Botanik (Philosophy of botany), 1905
- Haeckels Monismus und seine Freunde – ein freies Wort für freie Wissenschaft (Haeckel's monism and allies, a free word for free science), 1907
- Die Kunst der Weltanschauung (The Art of Belief), 1911
- Kritik der Abstammungslehre (Critique of the theory of evolution), 1920
- Naturwissenschaft, Weltanschauung, Religion, (Science, philosophy, religion), 1923
- Das dynamische Weltbild (The dynamic world view), 1926
- Wissemann, Volker (2012). Johannes Reinke: Leben und Werk eines lutherischen Botanikers. Volume 26 of Religion, Theologie und Naturwissenschaft / Religion, Theology, and Natural Science. Vandenhoeck & Ruprech. ISBN 3525570201, 9783525570203
