= August Alphonse Derbès =

August Alphonse Derbès (8 May 1818, Marseille – 27 January 1894, Marseille) was a French professor of naturalist, zoologist and botanist at the University of Marseille who studied reproduction of sea urchins and of algae. Derbès was the first scientist to observe the fertilization of an egg in an animal when he detailed the process of an envelope forming around the gamete during sea urchin reproduction, a process now known to be associated with Ca^{2+} release.

With Elisée Reverchon he issued the exsiccata Plantes de France.
