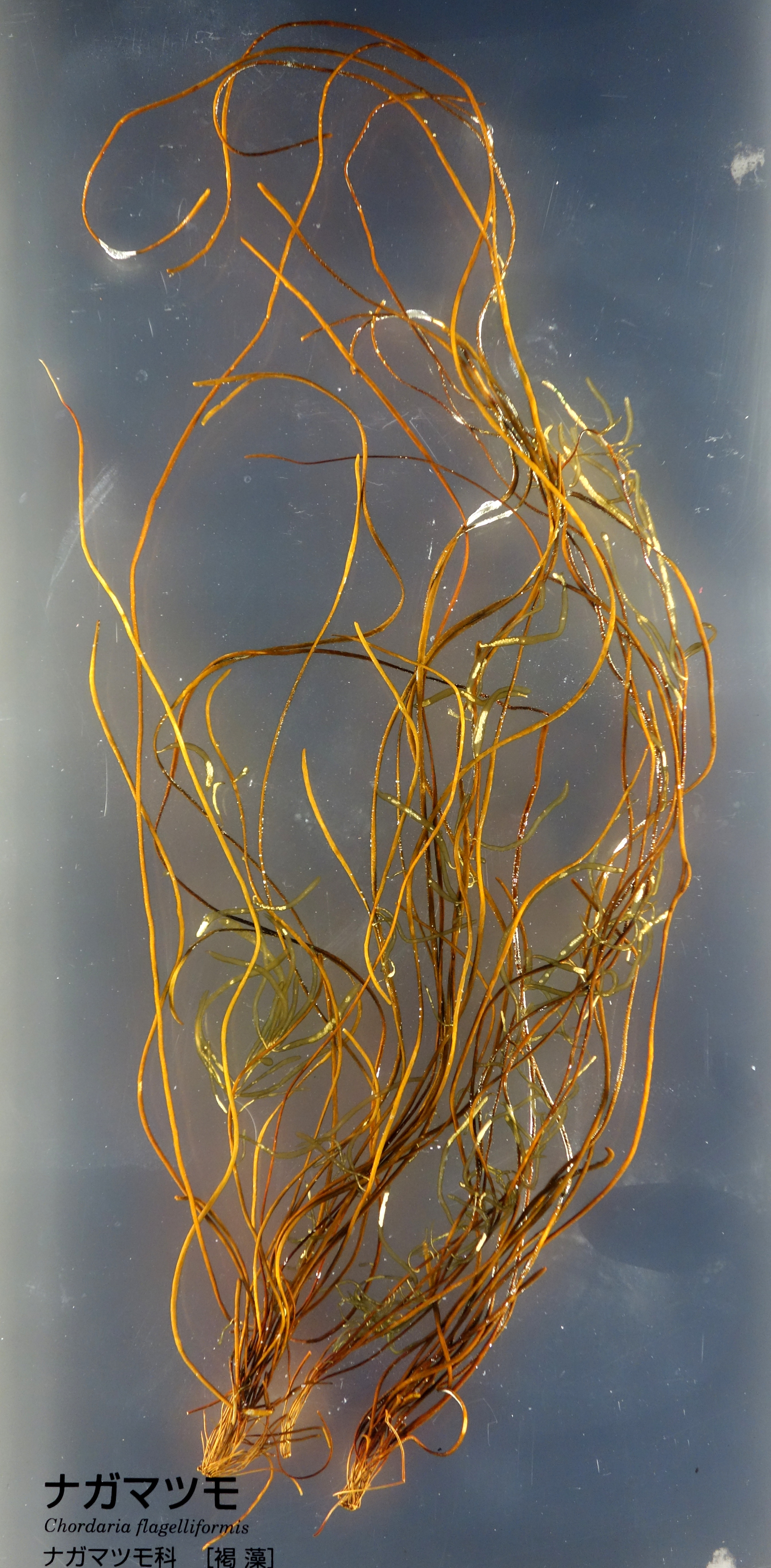
- Chordaria flagelliformis

Scientific classification
- Domain: Eukaryota
- Clade: Sar
- Clade: Stramenopiles
- Division: Ochrophyta
- Class: Phaeophyceae
- Order: Ectocarpales
- Family: Chordariaceae; Greville, 1830

Genera
- See text.

= Chordariaceae =

Family of algae

Chordariaceae is a family of brown algae. Members of this family are may be filamentous, crustose with fused cells at the base, or they may be terete and differentiated into a central medulla and an outer photosynthetic cortex. They have a sporphytic thallus usually aggregated to form a pseudo-parenchyma.

As their general name suggests their pigmentation is brown.

Genera include:

- Acrocytis Rosenvinge, 1933
- Acrospongium Schiffn., 1916
- Acrothrix Kylin, 1907
- Acrotrichium Womersley & Skinner, 1987
- Actinema Reinsch, 1874–1875
- Adriogloia Ercegovic, 1955
- Ascocyclus Magnus, 1874
- Ascoseirophila A.F.Peters, 2003
- Asperococcus J.V.Lamouroux, 1813
- Botrytella Bory de Saint-Vincent, 1822
- Buffhamia Batters, 1895
- Castagnea A.Derbès & A.Solier, 1851
- Chilionema Sauvageau, 1898
- Chordaria C.Agardh, 1817
- Chukchia R.T.Wilce, P.M.Pedersen & Sekida, 2009
- Cladochroa Skottsberg, 1921
- Cladosiphon Kützing, 1843
- Cladothele J.D.Hooker & Harvey, 1845
- Clathrodiscus Hamel, 1935
- Climacosorus Sauvageau, 1933
- Coelocladia Rosenvinge, 1893
- Coilodesme Strømfelt, 1886
- Corycus Kjellman, 1889
- Corynophlaea Kützing, 1843
- Cylindrocarpus P.L.Crouan & H.M.Crouan, 1851
- Dalmatogloia Ercegovic, 1955
- Delamarea Hariot, 1889
- Dermatocelis Rosenvinge, 1898
- Desmotrichum Kützing, 1845
- Dichosporangium Hauck, 1884
- Dictyosiphon Greville, 1830
- Elachista Duby, 1830
- Elachistiella Cassano, Yoneshigue-Valentin & M.J.Wynne, 2004
- Entonema Reinsch, 1875
- Eudesme J.Agardh, 1882
- Flabellonema Skinner & Womersley, 1984
- Fosliea Reinke, 1891
- Giraudia Derbès & Solier, 1851
- Gononema Kuckuck & Skottsberg, 1921
- Gontrania Sauvageau, 1936
- Halodictyon Kützing, 1843 (nomen dubium)
- Halonema Jaasund, 1951
- Halorhipis Saunders, 1898
- Halorhiza Kützing, 1843
- Halothrix Reinke, 1888
- Hamelella Børgesen, 1942
- Hecatonema Sauvageau, 1898 '1897'
- Heterophycus Trevisan, 1848
- Heterosaundersella Tokida, 1942
- Hummia J.Fiore, 1975
- Isthmoplea Kjellman, 1877
- Kolderupia S.Lund, 1959
- Kurogiella Kawai, 1993
- Laminariocolax Kylin, 1947
- Laminarionema Kawai & Tokuyama, 1995
- Leathesia S.F.Gray, 1821
- Leblondiella G.Hamel, 1939
- Leptonematella P.C.Silva, 1959
- Levringia Kylin, 1940
- Liebmannia J.Agardh, 1842
- Litosiphon Harvey, 1849
- Melanosiphon M.J.Wynne, 1969
- Melastictis Reinsch, 1890
- Mesogloia C.Agardh, 1817
- Mesogloiopsis Womersley & Bailey, 1987
- Microcoryne Strömfelt, 1888
- Microspongium Reinke, 1888
- Microsporangium
- Mikrosyphar Kuckuck, 1895
- Monosiphon L.Volkov, 1916
- Myelophycus Kjellman, 1893
- Myriactula Kuntze, 1898
- Myriocladia J.Agardh, 1841
- Myriogloea P.Kuckuck ex F.Oltmanns, 1922
- Myrionema Greville, 1827
- Myriotrichia Harvey, 1834
- Nemacystus Derbès & Solier, 1850
- Neoleptonema E.-Y.Lee & I.K.Lee, 2002
- Omphalophyllum Rosenvinge, 1893
- Papenfussiella Kylin, 1940
- Phaeophysema A.Tanaka, S.Uwai & H. Kawai, 2010
- Phaeostromatella P.J.L. Dangeard, 1970
- Phycocelis Strömfelt, 1888
- Pilocladus Kornmann, 1954
- Platysiphon R.T.Wilce, 1962
- Polycerea J.Agardh, 1882
- Proselachista Y.P.Lee & Garbary, 1999
- Protasperococcus Sauvageau, 1931
- Protectocarpus Kornmann, 1955
- Punctaria Greville, 1830
- Rhadinocladia Schuh, 1900
- Saundersella Kylin, 1940
- Sauvageaugloia G.Hamel ex Kylin, 1940
- Soranthera Postels & Ruprecht, 1840
- Spermatochnus Kützing, 1843
- Sphaerotrichia Kylin, 1940
- Stictyosiphon Kützing, 1843
- Stilophora J.Agardh, 1841
- Stilopsis Kuckuck, 1929
- Streblonemopsis R.Valiante, 1883
- Strepsithalia Bornet ex Sauvageau, 1896
- Striaria Greville, 1828
- Suringariella Womersley & Bailey, 1987
- Tinocladia Kylin, 1940
- Trachynema P.-M.Pedersen, 1985
- Ulonema Foslie, 1893
- Vimineoleathesia A.Tanaka, S.Uwai & H. Kawai, 2010
- Zeacarpa Anderson, Simons & Bolton, 1988
- Zonarina Ørsted
- Zonarius Ørsted
- Zosterocarpus Bornet, 1890
