= Gontran Hamel =

French phycologist

Gontran Georges Henri Hamel (1883–1944) was a French phycologist.

== Education and work ==
In 1927, Hamel earned his doctorate in natural sciences with a thesis on the red algae genera Acrochaetium and Rhodochorton. He is known for research performed in the "Laboratoire de Cryptogamie" at the Museum d'Histoire Naturelle in Paris.

In 1924 with Pierre Allorge (1891–1944), he was co-founder of the journal Revue algologique. Since 1927 he was also the editor and a contributor to the exsiccata series Algues de France.

In 1942 Frederik Børgesen named the brown algae genus Hamelella (family Chordariaceae) in his honor. Also, the red algae species Lithothamnion hamelii is one of several species that bear his name.

== Death ==
He reportedly died while trying to reach Paris by bicycle prior to its liberation in August 1944.

== Written works ==
- Recherches sur les genres Acrochaetium Naeg. et Rhodochorton Naeg., 1927. (doctoral thesis)
- Chlorophycées des côtes française, Revue algologique, 1928 - Chlorophyceae of coastal France.
- Floridées de France Laboratoire de Cryptogamie, (1924–1933) - Florideae of France.
- Phéophycées de France, 1931–1939 - Phaeophyceae of France.
- Corallinacées de France et d'Afrique du Nord (with Paul Lemoine) - Corallinaceae of France and northern Africa.
