= Paul Friedrich Reinsch =

Paul Friedrich Reinsch (21 March 1836 in Kirchenlamitz – 31 January 1914 in Erlangen) was a German phycologist and paleontologist.

== Biography ==
He studied natural sciences in Munich and Erlangen, afterwards working as a high school teacher in Erlangen, Zweibrücken and Baselland. Following retirement, he settled in Erlangen as a private scholar.

During his tenure in Baselland, he collected mosses, being inspired by the work of Wilhelm Philippe Schimper and Philipp Bruch. In his scientific travels, he spent two years in North America and considerable time in Cyprus. In the last 20 years of his life, he has focused his energy on the research of fossils Foraminifera.

== Commemorations ==
- Reinschia, a fossilised algae genus described by Charles Eugène Bertrand and Bernard Renault, 1893.
- Reinschiella, algae genus described by Giovanni Battista de Toni, 1889.

== Selected works ==
- "Algae and Related Subjects: - Collected Works", 1866.
- Middle Franconia"Contributiones ad algologiam et fungologiam", Volume 1, 1874.
- Neue Untersuchungen über die Mikrostruktur der Steinkohle des Carbon, 1881.
- "The Composition and Microscopical Structure of Coal", Victoria Institute (Great Britain).
- "Micro-Palaeophytologia Formationis Carboniferae", 1884.
- Zur Meeresalgenflora von Süd-Georgien, 1890 – On marine algae of South Georgia.
