= Reinke's space =

Potential space within the vocal cords

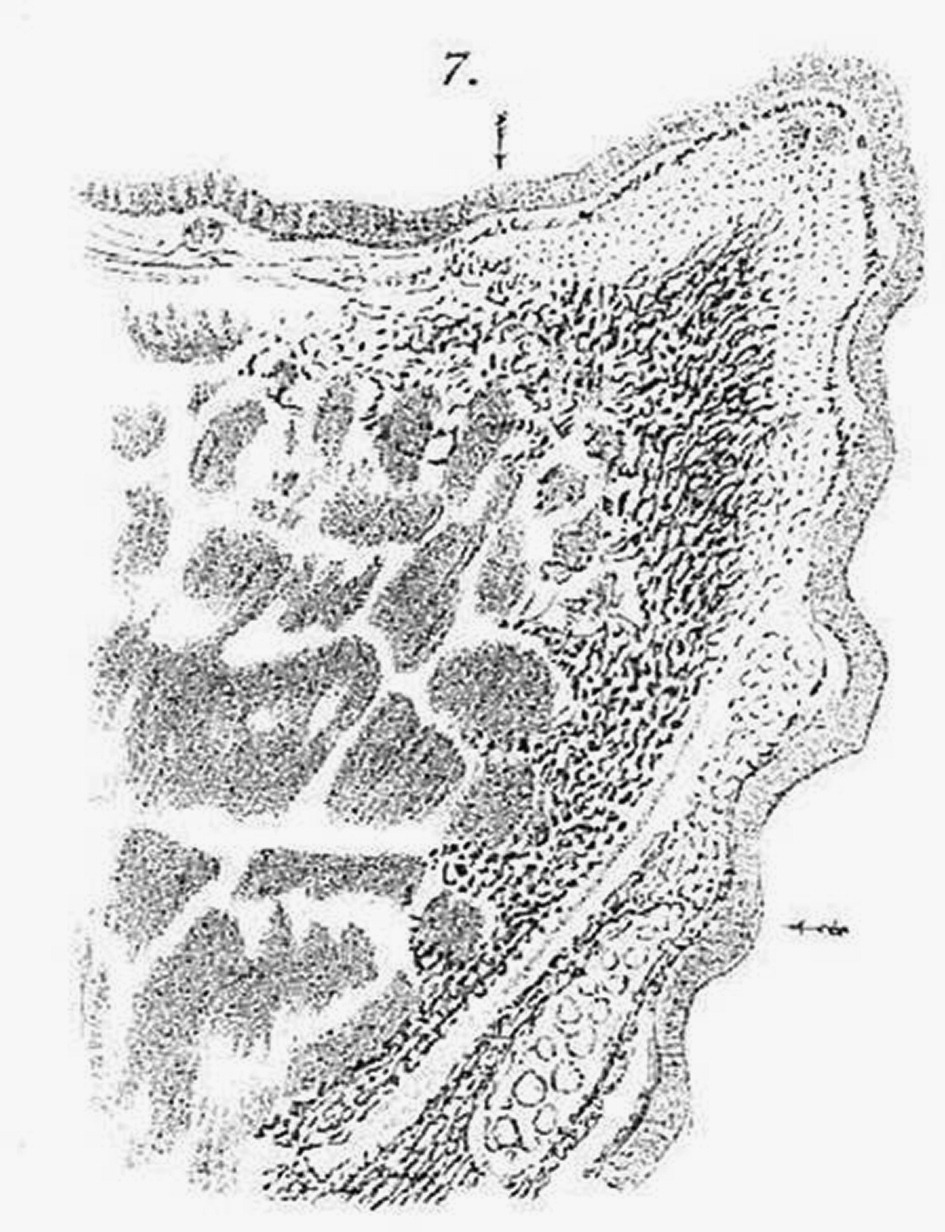

Reinke's space is a potential space between the vocal ligament and the overlying mucosa. It is not an empty space, but contains cells, special fibers and extracellular matrix. It plays an important role in the vibration of the vocal cords. Edema of this space is called Reinke's edema.
