= William Randolph Taylor =

American botanist and phycologist

- Born: December 21, 1895; Philadelphia, Pennsylvania
- Died: November 11, 1990 (aged 94)
- Education: University of Pennsylvania
- Scientific career
- Fields: Phycology
- Workplaces: University of Pennsylvania; University of Michigan
- Notable students: William Campbell Steere
- Author abbrev. (botany): W.R.Taylor

William Randolph Taylor (December 21, 1895 – November 11, 1990) was an American botanist and an expert in phycology.

== Early life ==
Taylor was born on December 21, 1895, in Philadelphia, Pennsylvania. He attended the University of Pennsylvania to study botany, receiving his B.S. in 1916, M.S. in 1917, and Ph.D. in 1920. In 1918, he served as private in the U.S. Army during WWI.

== Career ==
Taylor became a professor of the University of Pennsylvania in 1927. In 1930, he joined the Department of Botany of the University of Michigan teaching marine botany. He spent much of his time at the Marine Biological Laboratory in Woods Hole, Massachusetts. He was also Curator of Algae of the University of Michigan Herbarium.

His field work involved collecting trips to the Dry Tortugas, British Columbia, the Caribbean, Pacific Mexico, Central and South America, and the Galapagos Islands. His lab research dealt with cytogenetics and cytotaxonomy of seaweeds, specializing in the biology and classification of freshwater and marine algae. His goal was to catalog oceanic biodiversity.

In 1946, he was brought on as a senior biologist for Operation Crossroads by the United States Navy to conduct botanical surveys of the Marshall Islands before and after the testing of atomic bombs.

Taylor was a founding member of the Phycological Society of America and served as their second President in 1947. He was vice-president of the Botanical Society of America in 1956. He was a member of the American Academy of Arts and Sciences, the Royal Academy of Science, Letters and Fine Arts of Belgium, the Linnean Society of London, and the French Academy of Sciences.

== Selected publications ==
Taylor authored more than 140 works. His four principle publications are:

- Taylor, William Randolph (1937). Marine Algae of the Northeastern Coast of North America. ISBN 9781258422929.
- Pacific Marine Algae of the Allan Hancock Expeditions to the Galapagos Islands, 1945.
- Taylor, William Randolph (1950). Plants of Bikini and other Northern Marshall Islands. ISBN 9780598399113.
- Taylor, William Randolph (1960). Marine algae of the Eastern Tropical and Subtropical Coasts of the Americas.
