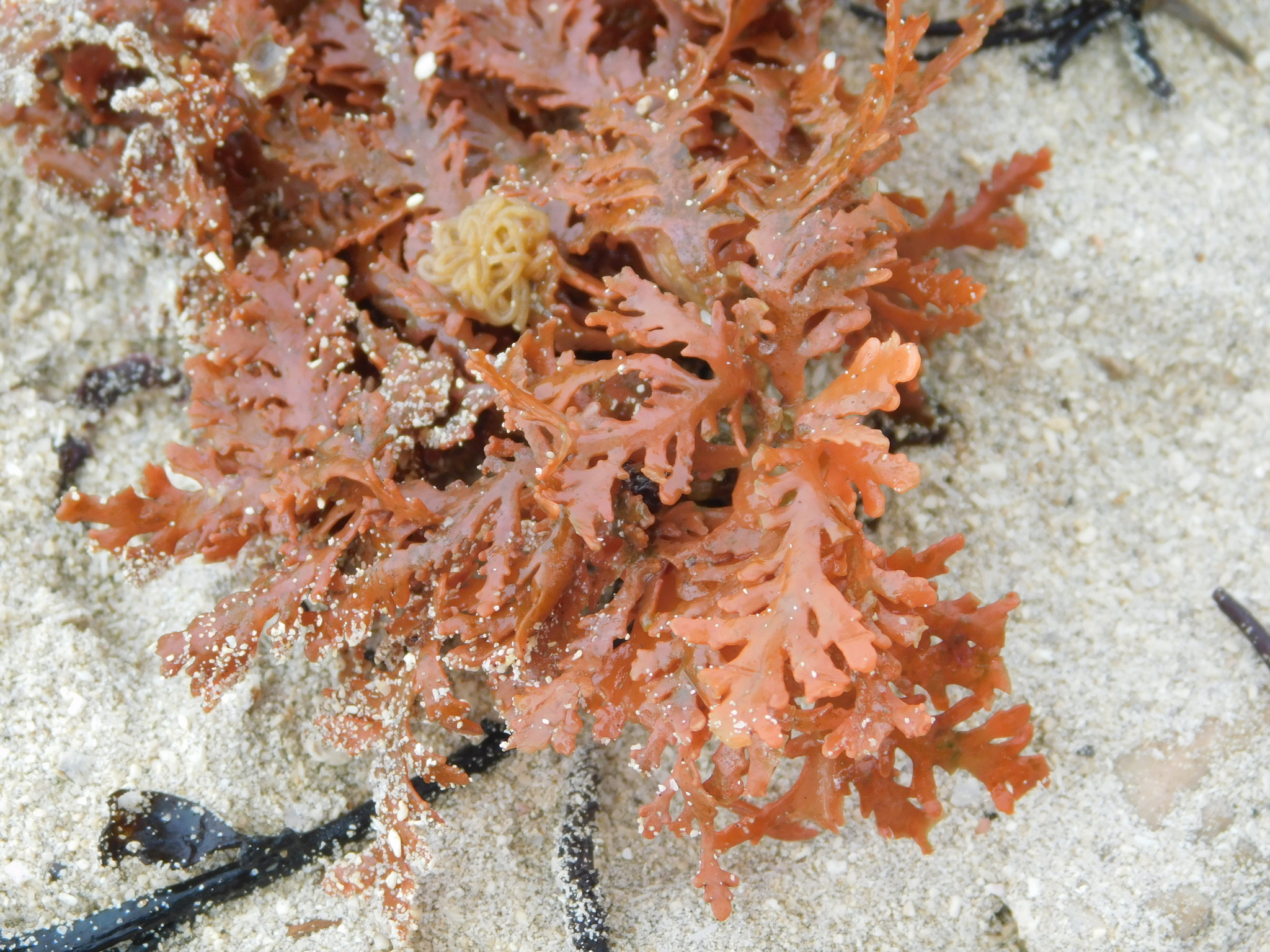
- Laurencia brongniartii

Scientific classification
- Domain: Eukaryota
- Clade: Archaeplastida
- Division: Rhodophyta
- Class: Florideophyceae
- Order: Ceramiales
- Family: Rhodomelaceae
- Genus: Laurencia; J. V. Lamouroux

Species
- See text

= Laurencia =

Genus of algae

Laurencia is a genus of red algae that grows in temperate and tropical shore areas, in littoral to sublittoral habitats, at depths up to 65 m (213 ft).

== Description ==
Laurencia species have a thallus that is erect or decumbent with distichous, whorled or radial branch arrangement.

== Taxonomy and Nomenclature ==
The genus name of Laurencia is in honour of Louis Jean de La Laurencie (1768-1829), who was a French Naval officer, Director of the University of Limoges and also a friend of the author, Jean Vincent Félix Lamouroux.

The genus was circumscribed by Jean Vincent Félix Lamouroux in Ann. Mus. Natl. Hist. Nat. vol.20 on page 130 in 1813. It included an initial description of eight species which then subsequently underwent taxonomic revisions. The genus belongs to order Ceramiales reported to have 137 species, with a rich body of knowledge spanning for more than 50 years of research.

Laurencia belongs to the family Rhodomelaceae which is considered to be one of the largest marine red algae family, estimated to have 125 genera and 700 species all over the world. In Laurenciae, a tribe consisting of eight genera, have a taxonomic group called "Laurencia complex" or Laurencia sensu lato which includes six of eight genera, Chondrophycus, Laurencia, Laurenciella, Osmundea, Palisada, and Yuzurua.

== Morphology ==
Laurencia is a small to medium-sized red algae which may appear to be iridescent with thalli reaching up to 40 cm. Thalli can be branching, which can either be bilateral or spread in all directions. Its appendages can be rhizoidal or discoidal in appearance on stoloniferous holdfasts. Branch shape appears to be flat or cylindrical in morphology. Branchlets may be slightly rigid with a shape that may be blunt, truncate or claviform.

Laurencia has shown high diversity as a genus, with species having distinct features that can easily be determined within the Laurencia complex. Molecular studies using rbcL (RuBisCO, Ribulose-1,5-Bisphosphate Carboxylase Oxygenase, Large chain) have uncovered evidences which divided the Laurencia complex, identifying the genus Laurenciella, which shares similar morphology with Laurencia but has a different rbcL sequence.

== Distribution ==
Laurencia can be found all over the world, in particular in tropical and subtropical regions with warmer waters. Its habitats range from tide pools, reef flats, mud flats, and a variety of hard substrates (e.g. rocks, corals), within intertidal and subtidal zones up to 65 m. It is also described as "turf-forming" wherein it can cover a majority of hard substrate in some areas.

In Myanmar, it can be found growing together with some species of Cladophora, Chaetomorpha, Dictyota, Gelidium, Ceramium, Caloglossa, Catenella, Polysiphonia, Acanthophora, and Bostrychia.

== Ecology ==
Laurencia has numerous ecological roles, serving as refuge for different marine organisms in areas where they grow abundantly, forming forests. They are also hosts of various mircoorganisms and parasitic algae, known as Janczewskia. As producers, they are also fed on by some grazers such as crabs, queen conch, and sea hares despite its chemical deterrent.

The growth of Laurencia is significantly affected by changes in nutrient availability and temperature. The effects of pollution in Laurencia are somewhat inconsistent showing its adaptability in Indian Ocean but markedly showed a decrease in biomass in polluted areas in the Mediterranean. Space within the environment is also a necessity for Laurencia survival. In field trials, Laurencia tends to inhibit coral larvae dispersal resulting to higher mortality when the algae is present.

== Life History ==
Laurencia grows throughout the year, with spermatangial individuals appearing from early August to late September while cystocarpic ones appear from mid-August to late October. From July to October, mature tetrasporangial plants appear. Gametophytic individuals are dioecious in nature, typically developed on the branchlets, but can be present in the main branch as well.

Male gametophytes contain spermatangia on trichoblast while female gametophytes contain carpogonia, representing the haploid phase. Two diploid phases occur in Laurencia: one with carpogonia and carpospore and the other, with tetrasporangia. Therefore, Laurencia undergoes three phases in its life cycle: one haploid phase and two diploid phases, consistent to the Polysiphonia triphasic life history.

== Cultivation and Exploitation ==
A growing interest in the cultivation of Laurencia brongniartii has emerged due to its potential to be a newfound source for antibiotics. The common method is indoor tank culture, utilizing an excised apical tip from a thalli sample. Initial trials have confirmed its viability for culture providing opportunities for personnel with little to no experience in algae cultivation. The cost of production is relatively low, with maintenance costs at its core. Small-scale operations may be profitable in maximizing algae production, however more studies are needed to evaluate these conditions.

== Chemical Composition ==
Laurencia species are known to have several natural products exhibiting numerous biological activities such as chemical defense against grazers, anti-fouling chemical affecting Perna perna attachment, and anti-fouling activities. In addition, Laurencia is known to be an abundant source of halogenated metabolites, including a variety of terpenes (e.g. sesquiterpenes, diterpenes, triterpenes, and C_{15} acetogenins).

In Vietnam, L. snackeyi may be a potential species to evaluate new chemical races, similar to L. nipponica seeing how these may indicate similarities in morphology but differences in chemical content subject to geographical distribution.

== Utilization and Management ==
A total of 1047 secondary metabolites have been extracted from Laurencia and Aplysia species since 2015. The diverse chemical composition of Laurencia has been subject to numerous research mainly attributed to both environmental and genetic factors. For years, humans have utilized Laurencia as food, medicinal products, fertilizers, and from recent research, an abundant source of pharmacological significance. The commercialization of the species may require further research in order to optimize culture conditions and eventually, harvest greater yield and develop a more systematic cultivation system.

== Species ==
AlgaeBase, a database with detailed information on species of Laurencia, includes 137 taxonomically accepted species as of 2018, and differentiates these from a further ~375 entries of uncertain taxonomic status; it further delineates homotypic or heterotypic synonyms.

Commonly observed species of Laurencia include the shallow subtidal Laurencia nidifica (Hawaii), Laurencia pacifica (California), and Laurencia thyrsifera (New Zealand). Species seen in the British Isles include Laurencia hybrida, Laurencia obtusa, Laurencia osmunda, Laurencia pinnatifida, Laurencia pyramidalis, and Laurencia truncata.

The World Register of Marine Species lists the following species as accepted:

- Laurencia aguilar-rosasorum J.N.Norris, 2014
- Laurencia aldingensis Saito & Womersley, 1974
- Laurencia alsidioides P.L.Crouan & H.M.Crouan, 1865 (species inquirenda)
- Laurencia arbuscula Sonder, 1845
- Laurencia batracopus (Bory de Saint-Vincent) Greville, 1830
- Laurencia boryi De Notaris, 1842
- Laurencia botrychioides Harvey, 1855
- Laurencia botryocarpa Shperk, 1869
- Laurencia botryoides (C.Agardh) Gaillon, 1828
- Laurencia brachyclados Pilger, 1920
- Laurencia brasiliana G.Martens, 1871
- Laurencia brongniartii J.Agardh, 1841
- Laurencia caduciramulosa Masuda & Kawaguchi, 1997
- Laurencia californica (Kützing) Kützing, 1865
- Laurencia calliclada Masuda, 1997
- Laurencia calliptera Kützing, 1865
- Laurencia canaliculata J.Agardh
- Laurencia caraibica P.C.Silva, 1972
- Laurencia caspica A.D.Zinova & Zaberzhinskaya, 1967
- Laurencia catarinensis Cordeiro-Marino & Fujii, 1985
- Laurencia cervicornis Harvey, 1853
- Laurencia chauvinii Bory de Saint-Vincent
- Laurencia chilensis De Toni, Forti & M.A.Howe, 1920
- Laurencia chinensis C.K.Tseng, 1943
- Laurencia chondrioides Børgesen, 1918
- Laurencia cladonioides Kützing
- Laurencia clarionensis Setchell & Gardner, 1937
- Laurencia clavata Sonder, 1853
- Laurencia clavifera Suhr
- Laurencia claviformis Børgesen, 1924
- Laurencia coelenterata D.L.Ballantine & Aponte, 1995
- Laurencia complanata (Suhr) Kützing, 1849
- Laurencia composita Yamada, 1931
- Laurencia condaoensis Pham Hoàng Hô
- Laurencia congesta Taylor, 1945
- Laurencia coronopus J.Agardh, 1852
- Laurencia corymbifera Kützing
- Laurencia corymbosa J.Agardh, 1852
- Laurencia crassifrons P.L.Crouan & H.M.Crouan
- Laurencia crustiformans K.J.McDermid, 1989
- Laurencia cryptoclada Kützing, 1866
- Laurencia cyanosperma (Delile) Gaillon, 1828
- Laurencia cyanosperma Delile ex J.V.Lamouroux, 1813
- Laurencia cylindrica (Kützing) Kützing
- Laurencia cymosa Kützing, 1865
- Laurencia decidua E.Y.Dawson, 1954
- Laurencia decumbens Kützing, 1863
- Laurencia dendroidea J.Agardh, 1852
- Laurencia densissima Setchell & N.L.Gardner, 1937
- Laurencia depauperata Zanardini
- Laurencia distichophylla J.Agardh, 1852
- Laurencia elata (C.Agardh) J.D.Hooker & Harvey, 1847
- Laurencia epiphylla F.Boisset & J.C.Lino, 1998
- Laurencia ericoides Kützing
- Laurencia fasciculata (Turner) Greville, 1830
- Laurencia fastigiata Montagne, 1846
- Laurencia fenicalli J.N.Norris, 2014
- Laurencia filiformis (C.Agardh) Montagne, 1845
  - Laurencia filiformis f. decussata A.B.Cribb
- Laurencia flagelliformis J.Agardh
- Laurencia flexuosa Kützing, 1849
- Laurencia foldatsii N.Rodríguez Rios, 1981
- Laurencia forsteri (Mertens ex Turner) Greville, 1830
- Laurencia galtsoffii M.A.Howe, 1934
- Laurencia gardneri Hollenberg, 1943
- Laurencia glomerata (Kützing) Kützing, 1849
- Laurencia gracilis J.D.Hooker & Harvey, 1849
- Laurencia griseaviolacea M.J.Wynne, 2017
- Laurencia hamata Yamada, 1932
- Laurencia hancockii E.Y.Dawson, 1944
- Laurencia heteroclada Harvey, 1855
- Laurencia hongkongensis C.K.Tseng, C.F.Chang, E.Z.Xia & B.M.Xia, 1980
- Laurencia humilis Setchell & N.L.Gardner, 1930
- Laurencia indica Hauck, 1888
  - Laurencia indica var. nidifica Hauck, 1888
- Laurencia intercalaris K.W.Nam, 1994
- Laurencia intricata J.V.Lamouroux, 1813
- Laurencia iriei J.N.Norris
- Laurencia irieii J.N.Norris
- Laurencia japonensis T.Abe & Masuda, 1998
- Laurencia johnstonii Setchell & Gardner, 1924
- Laurencia lageniformis Masuda & Suzuki, 1997
- Laurencia lajolla E.Y.Dawson, 1958
- Laurencia laurahuertana Mateo-Cid, Mendoza-González, Senties & Diaz-Larrea, 2014
- Laurencia laxa (R.Brown ex Turner) Gaillon, 1828
- Laurencia ligulata E.Y.Dawson, 1963
- Laurencia lutea J.V.Lamouroux
- Laurencia mariannensis Yamada, 1931
- Laurencia masonii Setchell & N.L.Gardner, 1930
- Laurencia maxineae E.Y.Dawson, 1944
- Laurencia mcdermidiae I.A.Abbott, 1996
- Laurencia mediocris Setchell & N.L.Gardner, 1937
- Laurencia melanothrix (Bory) Kützing
- Laurencia mexicana Kützing
- Laurencia microcladia Kützing, 1865
- Laurencia minuscula Schnetter, 1976
- Laurencia minuta H.Vandermeulen, Garbary & Guiry, 1990
  - Laurencia minuta subsp. scammaccae G.Furnari & Cormaci, 1990
- Laurencia moretonensis A.B.Cribb, 1958
- Laurencia multiflora Kützing, 1865
- Laurencia nana (C.Agardh) Greville, 1830
- Laurencia nangii Masuda, 1997
- Laurencia nanhaiensis L.Ding, B.Huang, B.M.Xia & C.K.Tseng, 2007
- Laurencia natalensis Kylin, 1938
- Laurencia nidifica J.Agardh, 1852
  - Laurencia nidifica var. tenuior Sonder
- Laurencia nipponica Yamada, 1931
- Laurencia nuda Suhr, 1840
- Laurencia obtusa (Huds.) J.V.Lamouroux, 1813 - type species
  - Laurencia obtusa var. compacta A.B.Cribb, 1958
  - Laurencia obtusa var. densa Yamada
  - Laurencia obtusa var. divaricata Yamada, 1931
  - Laurencia obtusa var. gracilis (C.Agardh) Zanardini, 1847
  - Laurencia obtusa f. laxa
  - Laurencia obtusa var. mollissima A.B.Cribb, 1958
  - Laurencia obtusa var. pulvinata Feldmann
  - Laurencia obtusa var. pyramidalis Harvey, 1849
  - Laurencia obtusa f. pyramidata (J.Agardh) Van Heurck, 1908
  - Laurencia obtusa var. pyramidica J.Agardh
  - Laurencia obtusa var. racemosa Kützing, 1865
  - Laurencia obtusa var. rigidula Grunow, 1874
- Laurencia obtusiuscula Setchell & Gardner, 1924
  - Laurencia obtusiuscula var. corymbifera Setchell & Gardner, 1924
  - Laurencia obtusiuscula var. laxa Setchell & Gardner, 1924
- Laurencia okamurae Yamada, 1931
- Laurencia oliveirana Yoneshigue, 1985
- Laurencia omaezakiana Masuda, 1997
- Laurencia oophora Kützing, 1865
- Laurencia oppositoclada Taylor
- Laurencia oppositocladia Taylor, 1945
- Laurencia ovalis (Huds.) Frauenfeld
- Laurencia pacifica Kylin, 1941
- Laurencia paitensis W.R.Taylor, 1947
- Laurencia pannosa Zanardini, 1872
- Laurencia parvula Børgesen, 1937
- Laurencia patentissima ützing, 1865
- Laurencia peninsularis Stegenga, J.J.Bolton & R.J.Anderson, 1987
- Laurencia peninsularis Taylor, 1945
- Laurencia pinnata Yamada, 1931
- Laurencia pinnatifida (S.G.Gmel.) Lamouroux
- Laurencia pistillaris J.V.Lamouroux, 1822
- Laurencia platyclada Børgesen, 1934
- Laurencia ptychodes A.B.Cribb, 1983
- Laurencia pumila (Grunow) Papenfuss, 1943
- Laurencia pyramidalis Bory de Saint-Vincent ex Kützing, 1849
- Laurencia pyramidata Bory de Saint-Vincent, 1852
- Laurencia pyrifera (Kützing) Kützing
- Laurencia radicans (Kützing) Kützing, 1849
- Laurencia richardsii E.Y.Dawson, 1954
- Laurencia rigida J.Agardh, 1876
- Laurencia saitoi L.P.Perestenko, 1980
- Laurencia scrippsensis E.Y.Dawson, 1944
- Laurencia setacea Kützing
- Laurencia shepherdii Saito & Womersley, 1974
- Laurencia silvae J.F.Zhang & B.M.Xia, 1983
- Laurencia similis K.W.Nam & Y.Saito, 1991
- Laurencia singaporensis Zanardini ex De Toni & Levi, 1888
- Laurencia snackeyi (Weber-van Bosse) M.Masuda, 1997
- Laurencia snyderae E.Y.Dawson, 1945
  - Laurencia snyderae var. guadalupensis E.Y.Dawson, 1963
- Laurencia spicifera Sonder, 1881
- Laurencia spinulifera Kützing, 1865
- Laurencia subcolumnaris Børgesen, 1954
- Laurencia subcorymbosa E.Y.Dawson, 1963
- Laurencia subdisticha E.Y.Dawson, Neushul & Wildman, 1960
- Laurencia subopposita (J.Agardh) Setchell, 1914
- Laurencia subsimplex C.K.Tseng, 1943
- Laurencia succulenta K.W.Nam, 2006
- Laurencia tasmanica J.D.Hooker & Harvey, 1849
- Laurencia tenera C.K.Tseng, 1943
- Laurencia tenuissima
  - Laurencia tenuissima var. corymbulosa Caldesi
- Laurencia thrysoidea Montagne
- Laurencia thyrsifera J.Agardh, 1876
- Laurencia thyrsoides (Turner) Gaillon, 1828
- Laurencia translucida Fujii & Cordeiro-Marina, 1996
- Laurencia tristicha C.K.Tseng, C.F.Chang, E.Z.Xia & B.M.Xia
- Laurencia tropica Yamada, 1931
- Laurencia tuberculosa J.Agardh
- Laurencia turbinata Setchell & N.L.Gardner, 1937
- Laurencia uncinata Zanardini, 1847
- Laurencia urceolata J.Agardh
- Laurencia usneoides (C.Agardh) Kützing, 1849
- Laurencia uvifera (Forsskål) Børgesen, 1932
- Laurencia venusta Yamada, 1931
- Laurencia verruculosa Børgesen, 1954
- Laurencia versicolor (Vahl) J.V.Lamouroux
- Laurencia vieillardii Kützing, 1865
- Laurencia viridis Gil-Rodríguez & Haroun, 1992
- Laurencia voragina W.R.Taylor, 1945
- Laurencia wrightii (Turner) Kützing

== Uses ==
Laurencia nidifica is used as a condiment in Hawaii due to its peppery taste.
