= Cutleria =

Cutleria is the scientific name of two genera of organisms and may refer to:

- Cutleria (alga), a genus of brown algae
- Cutleria (animal), an extinct genus of synapsids
