= Valonia =

Valonia may refer to:

- Valonia (alga), an algae genus in the family Valoniaceae
- Valonia (spider), a spider genus in the family Sparassidae
- Valonia oak (Quercus macrolepis), a tree species used in tanning
- Valonia (fly), a signal fly, described by David McAlpine, 2001 in the subfamily Platystomatinae of family Platystomatidae (Diptera)

== See also ==
- Vallonia
