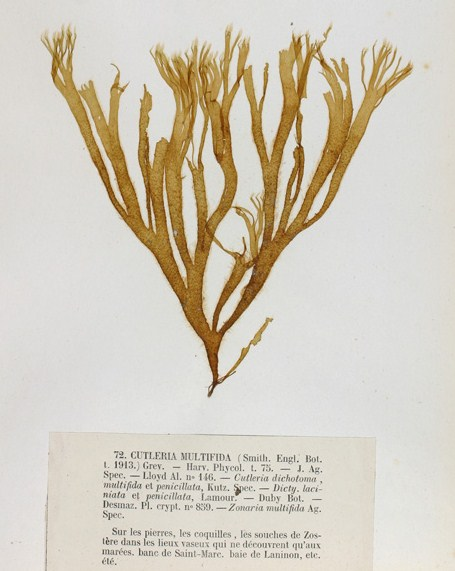
- Cutleria multifida

Scientific classification
- Domain: Eukaryota
- Clade: Diaphoretickes
- Clade: SAR
- Clade: Stramenopiles
- Phylum: Gyrista
- Subphylum: Ochrophytina
- Class: Phaeophyceae
- Order: Tilopteridales
- Family: Cutleriaceae; J.W.Griffith & A.Henfrey

Genera
- Cutleria; Zanardinia

= Cutleriaceae =

Family of algae

Cutleriaceae is a family of brown algae. It includes two genera, Cutleria and Zanardinia.
