= Laurencia mcdermidiae =

Scientific classification
- Domain: Eukaryota
- Clade: Archaeplastida
- Division: Rhodophyta
- Class: Florideophyceae
- Order: Ceramiales
- Family: Rhodomelaceae
- Genus: Laurencia
- Species: L. mcdermidiae

Binomial name
- Laurencia mcdermidiae I.A.Abbott, 1996

Species of red algae

Laurencia mcdermidiae is a species of red algae in the family Rhodomelaceae.
