= Zanardinia =

Scientific classification
- Domain: Eukaryota
- Clade: Diaphoretickes
- Clade: SAR
- Clade: Stramenopiles
- Phylum: Gyrista
- Subphylum: Ochrophytina
- Class: Phaeophyceae
- Order: Tilopteridales
- Family: Cutleriaceae
- Genus: Zanardinia; Nardo ex Zanardini, 1841
- Species: Z. typus

Binomial name
- Zanardinia typus (Nardo) P.C.Silva, 2000

Synonyms
- Stifftia nardi Zanardini, 1840; Stifftia prototypus Nardo, 1841; Stifftia typus Nardo, 1835; Zanardinia prototypus Zanardini, 1841; Zonaria squamaria var. lacerata Naccari

Genus of seaweeds

Zanardinia is a monotypic genus of seaweed in the brown algae (class Phaeophyceae). The only species, Zanardinia typus, commonly known as penny weed, is native to the northeastern Atlantic Ocean and the Mediterranean Sea.

The genus was circumscribed by Giovanni Domenico Nardo ex Giovanni Antonia Maria Zanardini in Mem. Real. Accad. Sci. Torino ser.2, vol.4 on page 236 in 1841.

The genus name of Zanardinia is in honour of Giovanni Antonio Maria Zanardini (1804–1878), who was an Italian physician and botanist who specialized in the field of phycology.

== Description ==
This brown alga is loosely secured to the rock by the felted rhizoids on the underside. Young individuals are circular and have a smooth surface and a double fringe of short hairs round the margin. Older individuals may be up to 20 cm (8 in) across and be fan-shaped or have broad blades with irregular margins. The consistency of the thallus is cartilaginous or leathery, and the colour is yellowish-brown or olive brown. Portions that become detached and wash up on the shore may crinkle as they dry and resemble pieces of blackish leather. This species could be confused with Cutleria adspersa, but that species tends to grow in brightly-lit, very shallow places while Z. typus prefers deeper, shadier habitats. Also, the upper and lower surfaces of the thallus of C. adspersa appear similar, but Z. typus has a distinctively-felted under surface.

== Distribution and habitat ==
Zanardinia typus is found in the northeastern Atlantic Ocean and the Mediterranean Sea, its range including southwestern Britain and Ireland, the Atlantic coast of France, Spain and Portugal, the western Mediterranean Sea, the Adriatic Sea and the Black Sea. It grows on rock and silty boulders in the shallow subtidal zone at depths down to about 20 m (66 ft).

== Biology ==
Growth in this species is "trichothallic", meaning that it occurs at the base of the marginal hairs. The edge of the thallus is two cells thick, and in the growth zone, the cells divide several times to form a thickened area with an upper cortex with about five rows of cells, a central parenchyma composed of long, thick-walled cells, and a lower cortex, with one or two rows of cells from which the rhizoids emerge. There is an alternation of generations in this brown alga into sporophytes and gametophytes, although these are similar in appearance. The reproductive organs differentiate on the upper surface of the thallus. The alga can also reproduce vegetatively, with cup-shaped new growths developing on old fronds.
