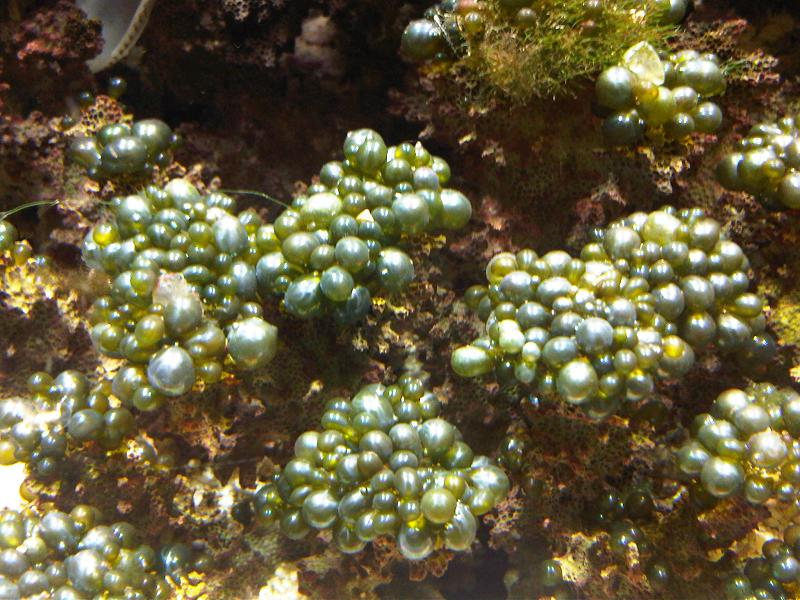
- A Valonia species cultivated in an aquarium

Scientific classification
- Kingdom: Plantae
- Division: Chlorophyta
- Class: Ulvophyceae
- Order: Cladophorales
- Family: Valoniaceae
- Genus: Valonia; C. Agardh, 1823

= Valonia (alga) =

Genus of green algae

Valonia is a genus of green algae in the family Valoniaceae. The genus Ventricaria is now regarded as a synonym of Valonia.

== Taxonomy and nomenclature ==
The genus Valonia belongs to the family Valoniaceae in the order Cladophorales. It comprises several taxonomically acceptable species based on available data and literature.

Below is a list of common species of Valonia found throughout the tropics:

- Valonia fastigiata Harvey ex J. Agardh, 1823
- Valonia ventricosa J. Agardh, 1887
- Valonia utricularis (Roth) Agardh, 1823
- Valonia aegagropila C. Agardh, 1823
- Valonia macrophysa Kützing, 1843
- Valonia ovalis C. Agardh, 1822
- Valonia chlorocladus Hauck, 1886
- Valonia cespitula Zanardini ex Kützing
- Valonia pachynema (G. Martens) Børgesen
- Valonia barbadensis W. R. Taylor, 1969
- Valonia nutrix (Kraft & A. J. K. Millar) Kraft, 2007
- Valonia oblongata J. Agardh, 1887
- Valonia trabeculata Egerod, 1952

== General morphology ==
=== Thalli ===
The succulent thallus of Valonia exhibits various shapes and forms depending on species: vesicular or tubular cells forming either irregular cushions or hemispherical domes of intermediate sizes. Thalli color can be green to dark green, olive-green, and brownish green in some species.

=== Vesicles and rhizoid systems ===
The vesicles can be subspherical, subclavate, elongate, or deformed. The branching of vesicles begins at the lenticular cells, which can be terminal and subdichotomous, or lateral and irregular. Seaweeds are attached to the substratum by a short rhizoid system to basal rhizoidal cells.

== Life history ==
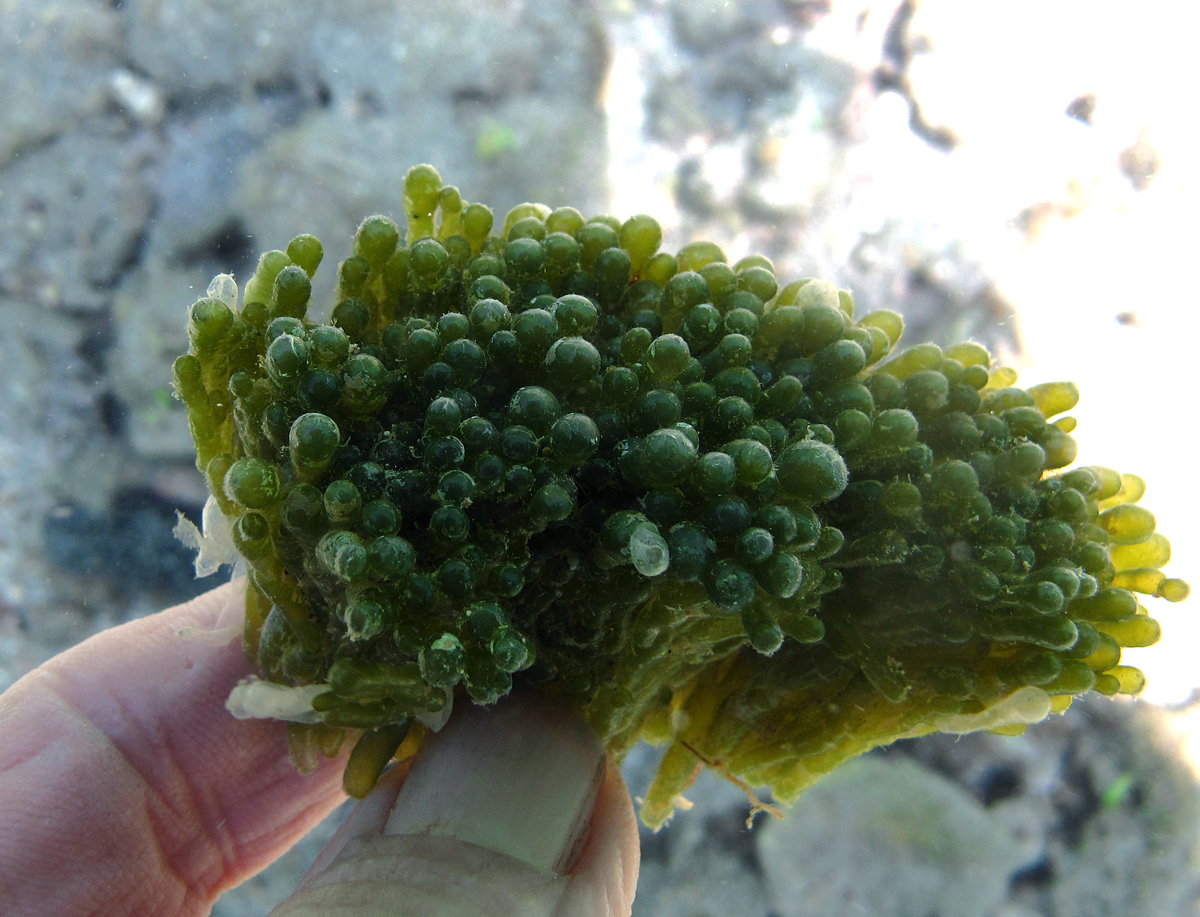
Valonia fastigiata

The life history of the genus Valonia is indistinguishable from that of other members of the Siphonocladales, particularly those of the genus Boergesenia. Similar to several seaweeds, they exhibit a diplohaplontic life cycle, meaning an alternation between haploid (gametophytic) and diploid (sporophytic) free-living forms completes the cycle.

Specifically in Valonia, production of three types of quadriflagellate zoospores (diploid) were observed and recorded in the species Valonia fastigiata and Valonia utricularis. These are mitozoospores (diploid) and meiozoospores (haploid) produced from the sporophytic phase, and mitozoospores (haploid) produced by the gametophytes. Eventually, meiozoospores will give rise to the gametophytes, while the mitozoospores produces the sporophytes, thus completing the life cycle.

== Distribution and ecology ==
The genus Valonia is widely distributed throughout the tropical region, and some extends to the warm temperate areas. They are mainly found in coastal shallow waters from low intertidal to upper intertidal areas, typically 10 m (33 ft) deep, inhabiting sheltered or wave-exposed rocky substrates and pools.

Previous studies have shown that the Mediterranean Sea ecotype, Valonia utricularis, can extend its biogeographic distribution to warm temperate regions. This is attributed to the seaweed chloroplasts' ability to function as a thermal acclimation organelle in response to exposure to varying temperature levels. It is achieved by careful regulation of the number of pigments produced, thereby decreasing light attainment in exchange for increasing the capacity for zeaxanthin-induced energy dissipation. However, ecotypes from the Indian Ocean display photoinhibition when exposed to colder temperatures.

In addition, Valonia utricularis, along with other intertidal seaweeds (including Gelidium corneum, Osmundea pinnatifida, and Caulacanthus ustulatus), were found to influence the vertical distribution of peracarid crustaceans in the lower intertidal zones. Peak densities of peracarids were found to coincide with the highest seasonal growth of the associated macroalgae (around April–August). However, there are also some important ecological factors such as weather conditions, competitions, and predation which may also influence distribution patterns.

== Economic products and uses ==
Many members of the genus Valonia, and especially the species Valonia aegagropila, are utilized for human consumption as food. These algae contain numerous natural products/secondary metabolites, such as pigments (carotene, chlorophyll a, chlorophyll b, lutein, siphonaxanthin, zeaxanthin, and siphonein), polysaccharides (starch), and minerals (heavy metals).

Valonia ventricosa, which contains similar natural products, is often studied for the crystalline structure of its cellulose to promote applications on accurate physical measurements. The crystal structure of Valonia cellulose Iβ was studied by Finkenstadt and Millane (1998). Using X-ray fiber diffraction analysis, they resolved ambiguities in the cellulose structure that had been baffling biologists for years. The crystal structures were shown to be in parallel-up arrangements. The packing of the cellulose sheets of Valonia is similar to the ramie cellulose (ramie fiber) found in other macroalgae and higher plant taxa. Applications in fabric production can be explored due to the fact that ramie fiber is specifically used in that industry.

Production of levulinic acid from Valonia aegagropila and another member of the Cladophorales, Chaetomorpha linum, were also explored and developed in recent years. Using an acid-catalyzed conversion, Valonia aegagropila was studied as a potential source for levulinic acid. The results were promising, achieving 16 percent by weight from V. aegagropila, calculated with respect to the initial dried biomass. This supports the potential use of this macroalga as a starting feedstock for renewable biofuels which can address natural resource and environmental issues.

Amino acids such as alanine, glutamine, methionine, proline, and asparagine, among others, as well as minerals such as calcium (Ca), magnesium (Mg), sodium (Na), potassium (K), and chlorine (Cl), were also found in high concentrations in Valonia, specifically Valonia fastigiata. Furthermore, relatively high content of unsaturated fatty acids were found within Valonia aegagropila along with other macroalgae including red algae (Agarophyton tenuistipitatum) and brown seaweeds (Phaeophyta). Unsaturated fatty acids are healthy fats that can be utilized for medicinal applications such as improving cholesterol levels, reducing inflammations, and stabilizing heart rhythms, among others.
