= Kappa Alpha Theta =

North American collegiate sorority

- ΚΑΘ
- Founded: January 27, 1870; 156 years ago DePauw University
- Type: Social
- Affiliation: NPC
- Status: Active
- Scope: North America
- Motto: "Leading Women"
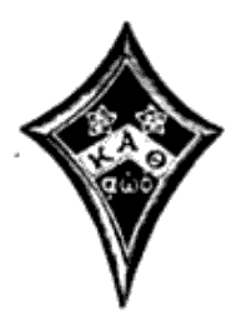
- Member badge
- Colors: Black and Gold
- Symbol: Kite, Twin Stars
- Flower: Black and gold pansy
- Publication: The Kappa Alpha Theta Magazine
- Philanthropy: Court Appointed Special Advocates and The Friendship Fund
- Chapters: 212 collegiate, 200+ alumnae
- Members: 270,000+ lifetime
- Headquarters: 8740 Founders Road; Indianapolis, Indiana 46268; United States
- Website: kappaalphatheta.org

Kappa Alpha Theta (ΚΑΘ), commonly referred to simply as Theta, is an international women's fraternity founded on January 27, 1870, at DePauw University in Greencastle, Indiana. It was the first Greek-letter fraternity established for women. The organization has 147 chapters at colleges and universities in the United States and Canada. The organization was the first women's fraternity to establish a chapter in Canada. Theta's total living initiated membership, as of 2020, was more than 250,000. There are more than 200 alumnae chapters and circles worldwide.

Kappa Alpha Theta is a member of the National Panhellenic Conference (NPC), an umbrella organization that encompasses 26 social sororities found throughout North America. The organization's own headquarters are located in Indianapolis, Indiana.

== History ==
The Alpha chapter of Kappa Alpha Theta was founded at Indiana Asbury University, now DePauw University in Greencastle, Indiana, on January 27, 1870. The university began admitting women in 1867 after 30 years of a male-only student body. However, women were excluded from male-only clubs and societies. In response to the lack of women's organizations, the fraternity's founding members established the first Greek letter women's organization. The founders were Elizabeth McReynolds Locke Hamilton (Bettie Locke), Alice Olive Allen Brant (Alice Allen), Elizabeth Tipton Lindsey (Bettie Tipton), and Hannah Virginia Fitch Shaw (Hannah Fitch).

Bettie Locke developed the idea for a Greek letter women's society through the encouragement of her father, a professor at Indiana Asbury and a member of Beta Theta Pi, and the members of Phi Gamma Delta at Indiana Asbury, which included her brother. Initially, the Phi Gamma Delta men offered Locke their badge as a token of their friendship, but voted against initiating her as a member. Locke refused to wear the badge as she did not know the secrets and purposes the badge represented, since she was unable to become a member. Ultimately, the fraternity gifted her a symbolic silver fruit basket instead to represent their relationship and fondness for her.

Upon discovering that there were no Greek letter fraternities for women in existence (only literary societies for women existed at the time), Locke decided to create her own Greek letter fraternity for women. Kappa Alpha Theta's ritual, organizational structure, badge, and coat of arms were influenced by those of Beta Theta Pi and Phi Gamma Delta due to her familial connections. Locke and her friend Alice Allen wrote a constitution, planned rituals, designed a badge, and sought out women on campus to become members. Along with Hannah Fitch and Bettie Tipton, the first initiation was held in secret on January 27, 1870, establishing the Alpha chapter of Kappa Alpha Theta.

Theta's grand convention voted to establish a magazine in 1885 and to place its editorship with Kappa chapter at Kansas. In the intervening years, Kappa Alpha Theta's magazine has undergone a change of title from The Journal to The Kappa Alpha Theta Magazine and a change of publication schedule (from monthly to quarterly). The Kappa Alpha Theta Magazine currently is published in April, June, September, and December of each year.

In 1887, Theta became an international organization with the establishment of the Sigma chapter at the University of Toronto. This became the first Canadian women's fraternity. By 1907, Kappa Alpha Theta had initiated 3,500 members at 27 college chapters and thirteen alumnae chapters.

G. William Domhoff, writing in Who Rules America?, listed Kappa Alpha Theta as one of "the four or five sororities with nationwide prestige" in the mid-1960s.

== Symbols ==
The Kappa Alpha Theta motto is "Faith, hope, love--these three, but the greatest of these is love". The badge is a kite-shaped shield with a gold border and a black enamel center with two diamond stars and a white chevron with the Greek letters ΚΑΘ. Its new member pin is a black and gold square. Its insignia is stars, keys, scythe, torch, and ermine.

Kappa Alpha Theta's colors are black and gold. Its symbols are both the kite and twin stars. Its flower is the black and gold pansy. The fraternity does not recognize an official stone. Its publication is The Kappa Alpha Theta Magazine, established in 1885.

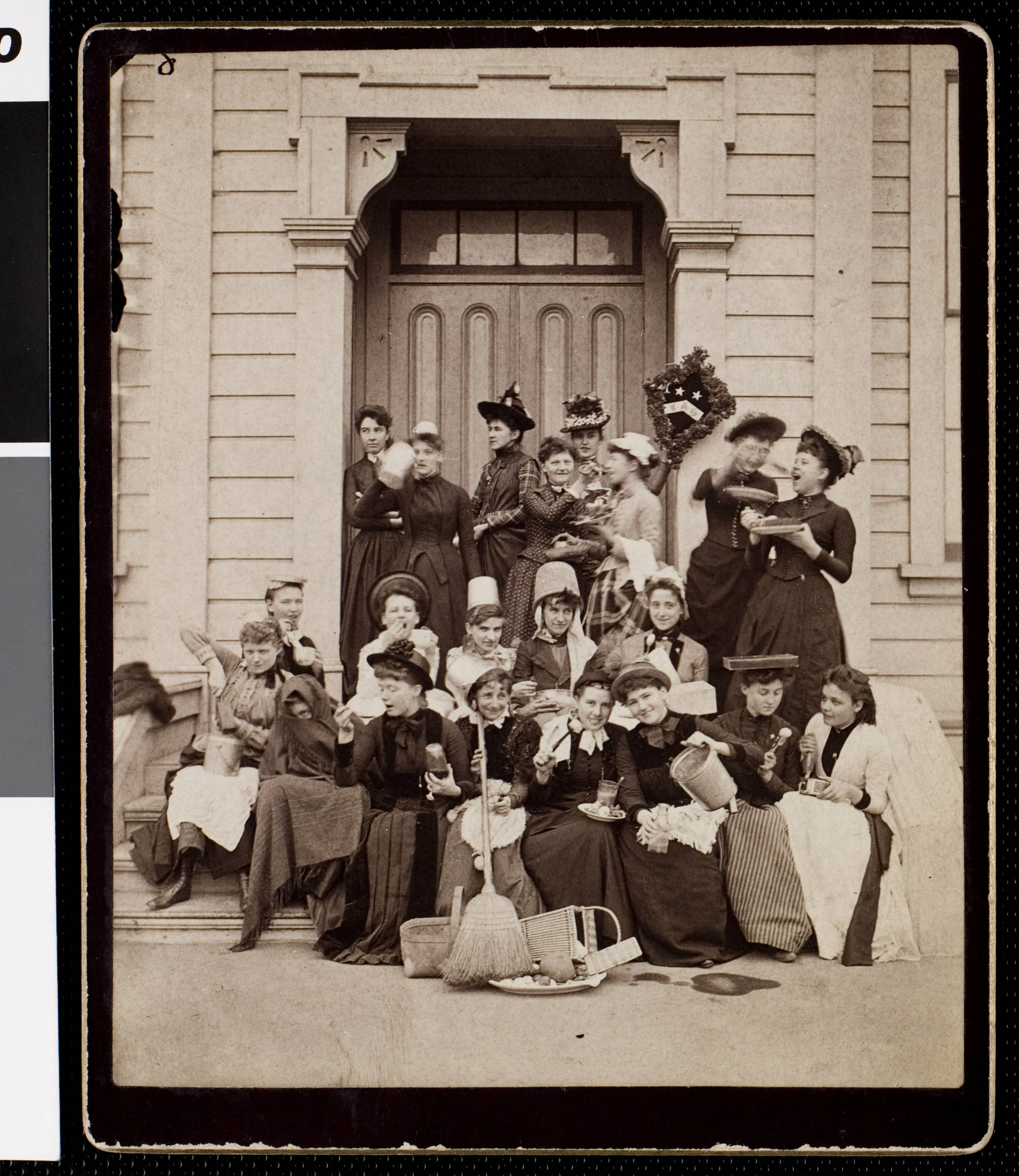
Omicron chapter members at USC, c. 1890s

== Chapters ==
Kappa Alpha Theta has more than 143 active college chapters and more than 212 alumnae chapters across the United States and Canada. Alumnae chapters are alumnae groups that have been granted charters from Grand Council. The following is a list of the chapters of Kappa Alpha Theta:

== Philanthropy ==
The Kappa Alpha Theta Foundation was founded in 1960 and is the philanthropic arm of the organization. The Theta Foundation awards annual undergraduate and graduate scholarships to its members, awarding more than $1.1 million per year. In addition to scholarships, the Theta Foundation also supports the sorority's educational programs as well as its international philanthropy, Court Appointed Special Advocates (CASA). Court Appointed Special Advocates (CASA's) are community volunteers who serve as the voice for abused and neglected foster care children who are going through the court system. CASA's are appointed by a judge and their purpose is to ensure all legal actions made are in the child's best interest. In order to directly volunteer as a CASA you must be 21 years of age or older.

== Notable members ==
Some notable alumni of Kappa Alpha Theta include Agnes de Mille, Laura Bush, Barbara Bush, Jenna Bush, Tory Burch, Melinda French Gates, Amy Holmes, Sheryl Crow, Gretchen Whitmer, Kerri Strug, Rue McClanahan, Amy Grant, Jennifer Cook, and Tiffany Trump.

Laura Bush was a member of the Beta Sigma chapter at Southern Methodist University in University Park, Texas. Her daughters Barbara and Jenna Bush were members at Yale University and the University of Texas at Austin, respectively. Tory Burch, an American fashion designer, businesswoman, and philanthropist was a member of Kappa Alpha Theta at the University of Pennsylvania, an Ivy League university in Philadelphia. Amy Holmes, an American journalist and political commentator, was a member of Kappa Alpha Theta at Princeton University. Sheryl Crow was a member at the University of Missouri in Columbia, Missouri. Gretchen Whitmer, Michigan's current governor, was a Theta at Michigan State University in East Lansing, Michigan. Amy Grant, an American singer, was a member of the Alpha Eta chapter at Vanderbilt University in Nashville, Tennessee.

The first women admitted to Phi Beta Kappa honor society were Thetas.

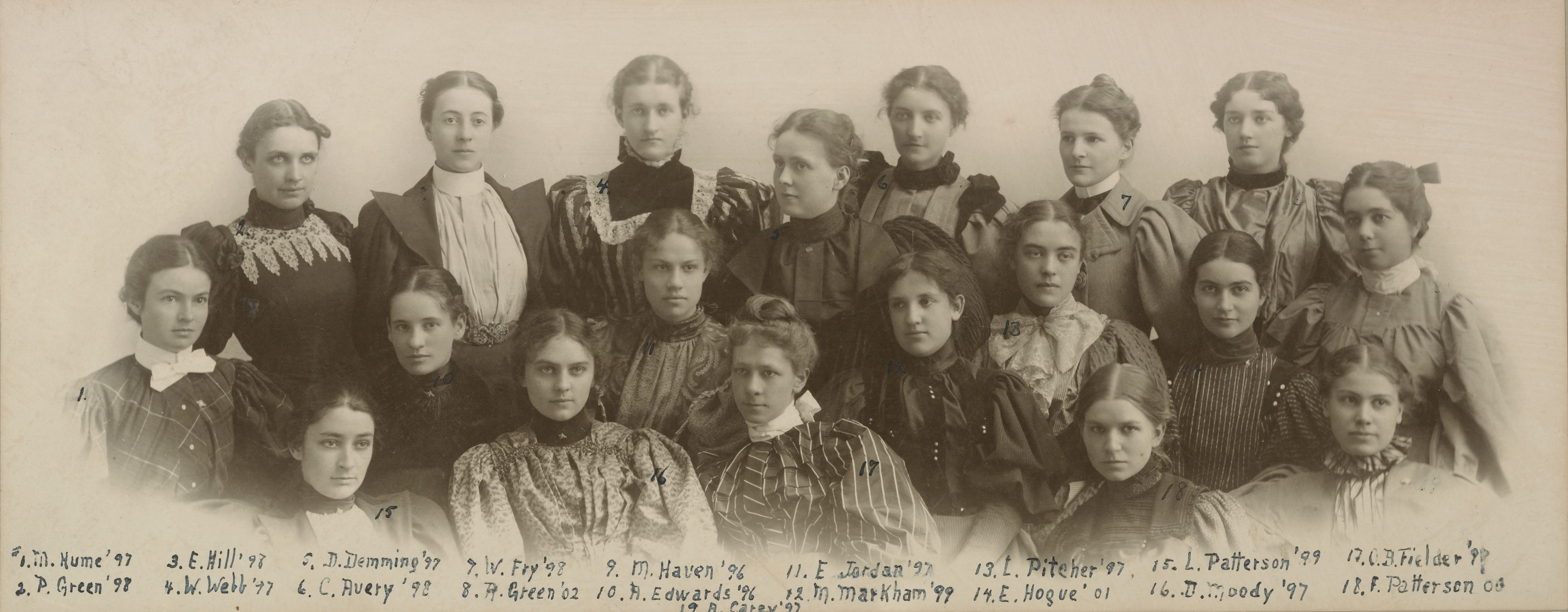
Members of Stanford University's Phi chapter in Stanford, California, circa 1897. From top left to right: 1) Hume, M., 2) Green, P., 3) Hill, Edith, 4) Webb, Winnifred, 5) Demming, Daisy, 6) Avery, C., 7) Fry, W., 8) Green, Ruby, 9) Haven, Martha, 10) Edwards, Ada, 11) Jordan, Edith, 12) Markham, M., 13) Pitcher, L., 14) Hogue, Elizabeth, 15) Patterson, Letitia, 16) Moody, Ora, 17) Fielder, Ortha Belle, 18) Patterson, Frances, and 19) Carey, A.

== Local chapter misconduct ==
In 2000, the chapter at the University of Cincinnati in Cincinnati was temporarily suspended for hazing. The pledges were forced to endure several demeaning tasks, one of which included crawling up the steps of the sorority house for the amusement of their big sisters.

In 2000, the chapter at Rollins College in Winter Park, Florida was shut down after a drinking party sent newly pledged members to the hospital. One member passed out and was placed on a respirator that night.

In 2008, the chapter at Colgate University in Hamilton, New York was suspended for four years after an alcohol-hazing related incident.

In 2014, the chapter at Columbia University in New York City was under national scrutiny after hosting a racially and ethnically insensitive event that went viral. Some of the costumes worn by sorority members were based on stereotypes meant to represent Mexico, Japan, the Netherlands, Ireland, Jamaica, and other countries. The sorority publicly apologized for the event.

In 2016, the 137-year old chapter at the University of Michigan in Ann Arbor, Michigan, was suspended by the university for underage drinking and hazing. The chapter was disbanded by the national organization a few weeks later for violating the suspension.

In 2018, chapters at the University of Mississippi in Oxford, Mississippi, and Clemson University in Clemson, South Carolina, were closed for failure to meet quota. There was a great deal of opposition, for members felt they were being unfairly punished simply for being less popular than other National Panhellenic Conference (NPC) sororities on campus, and not for risk management or academic issues.

In February 2022, the members of the Eta Mu chapter at Occidental College in Los Angeles voted to disband the chapter following a controversy with a member, who reportedly sent anti-Asian and anti-Black messages in a private group chat among friends in a December 2020 incident that did not surface until two years later.

In February 2022, the chapter at Southern Methodist University (SMU) was placed on a two-year suspension by the university for pressuring pledges to drink large amounts of alcohol and other hazing activities that endangered their safety and mental health. The chapter was sanctioned for a similar violation in 2020. After being suspended in 2022, members of the chapter created an off-campus-based organization known as "The Society" in order to continue to recruit new members and uphold the chapter's legacy. SMU officials stated that "The Society" was another violation of the Student Code of Conduct, and worked to disband the organization and to penalize fraternities seen socializing with members of it. Also, the CEO of Kappa Alpha Theta, Jennifer Schmaltz, delayed the return of the chapter an additional year because she did not like its similarities to the sorority. Parents of "The Society" members hired lawyers on behalf of their daughters to fight to keep the organization until the official return of Kappa Alpha Theta at SMU.

== See also ==
- List of social sororities and women's fraternities
