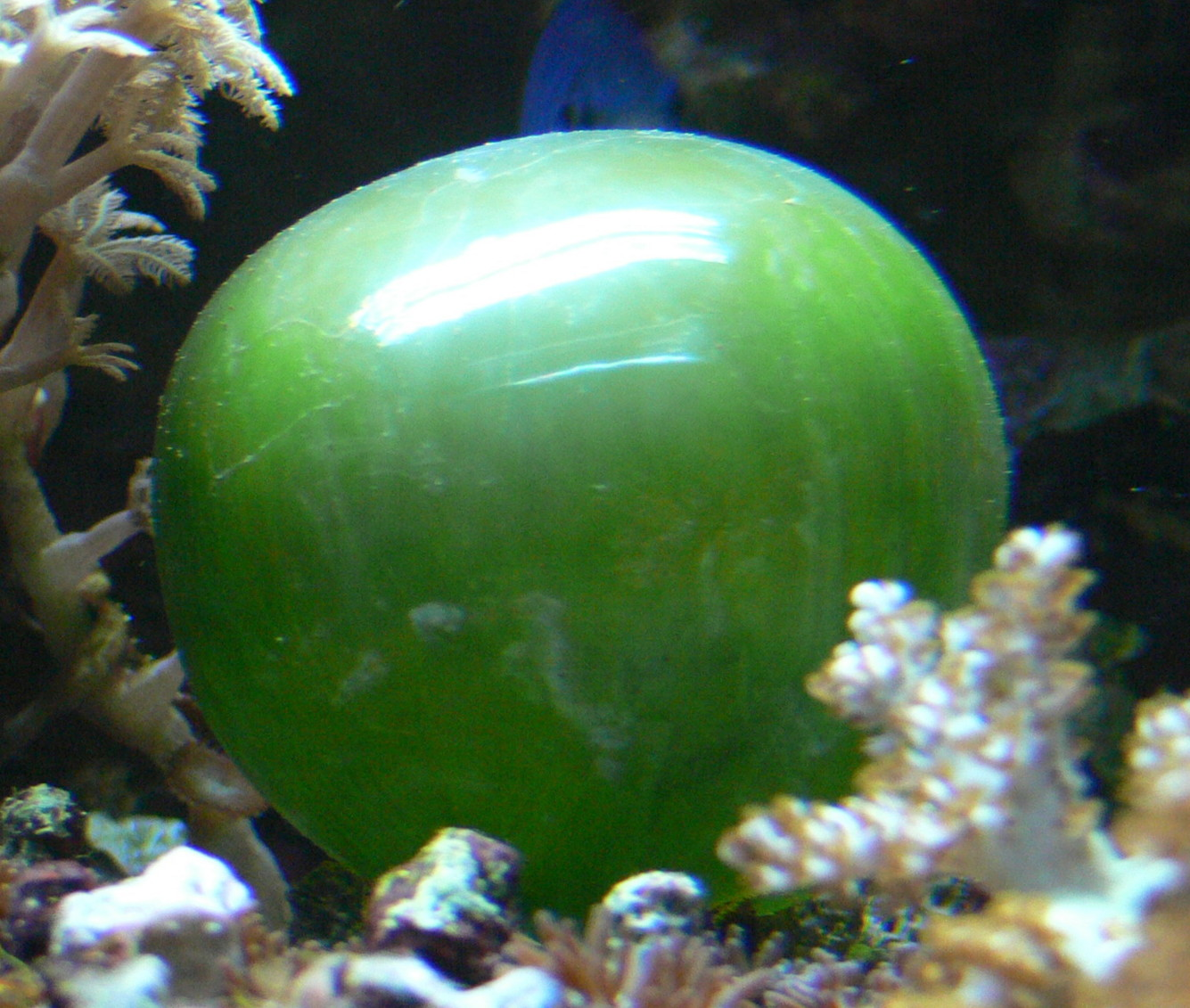

Scientific classification
- Domain: Eukaryota
- Supergroup: Archaeplastida
- Clade: Viridiplantae
- Division: Chlorophyta
- Class: Ulvophyceae
- Order: Cladophorales
- Family: Valoniaceae
- Genus: Valonia
- Species: V. ventricosa

Binomial name
- Valonia ventricosa J.Agardh 1887

Synonyms
- Ventricaria ventricosa

= Valonia ventricosa =

Large, unicellular species of algae

Valonia ventricosa, also known as bubble algae, sea grape, or sailor's eyeballs, is a species of algae within the phylum Chlorophyta found in tropical and subtropical regions throughout the world's oceans. It is one of the largest known unicellular organisms.

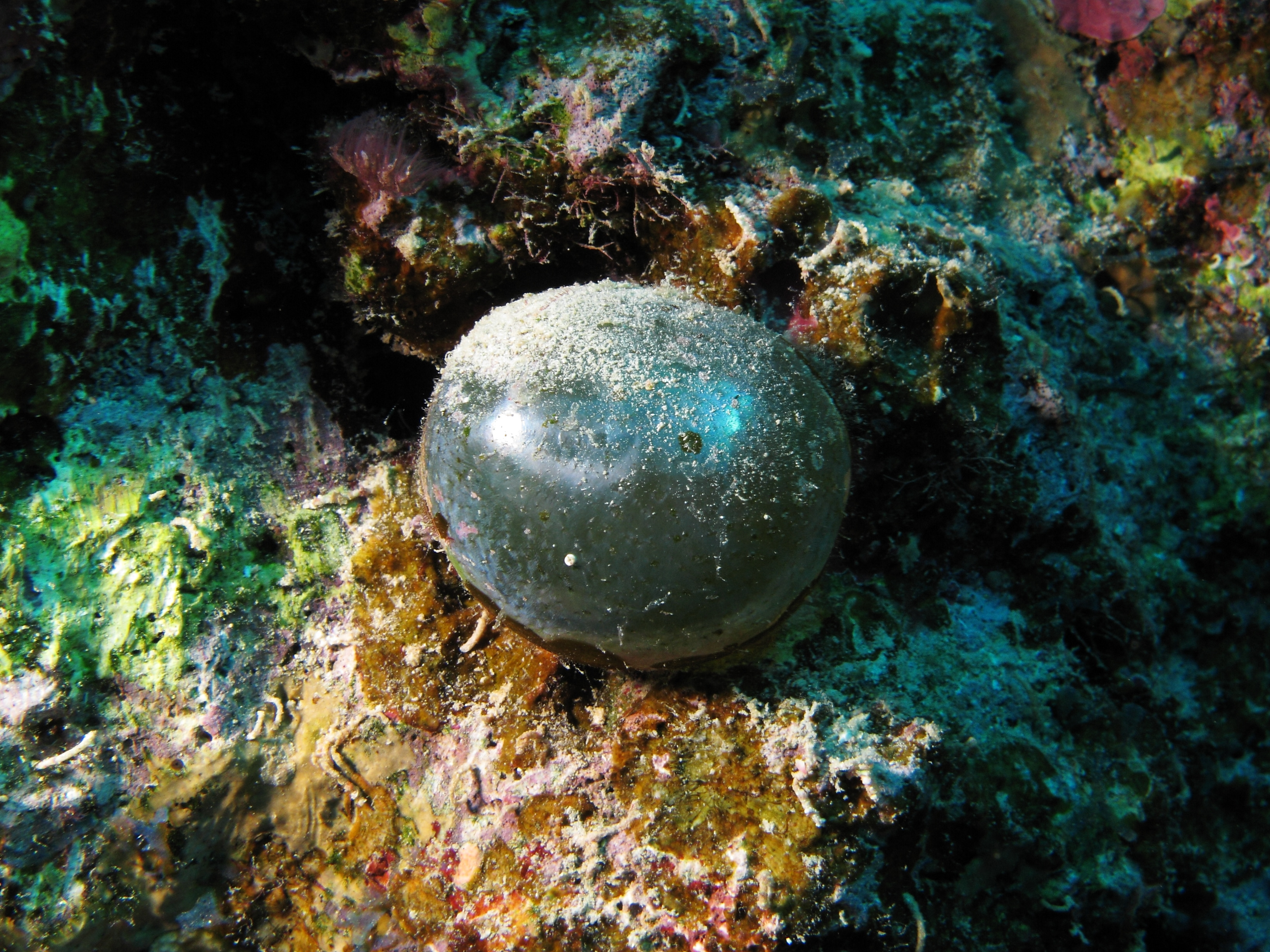
Valonia ventricosa in the Red Sea

== Characteristics ==
Valonia ventricosa has a coenocytic structure with multiple nuclei and chloroplasts. This organism possesses a large central vacuole that is multilobular in structure (lobules radiating from a central spheroid region).

The entire cell contains several cytoplasmic domains, with each domain having a nucleus and a few chloroplasts. Cytoplasmic domains are interconnected by cytoplasmic "bridges" that are supported by microtubules. The peripheral cytoplasm (whose membrane is overlaid by the cell wall) is only about 40 nm thick.

Valonia ventricosa typically grow individually, but in rare cases they can grow in groups.

=== Environment ===
They appear in tidal zones of tropical and subtropical areas, like the Caribbean, north through Florida, south to Brazil, and in the Indo-Pacific. Overall, they inhabit every ocean throughout the world, often living in coral rubble. The greatest observed depth for viability is approximately 80 metres (260 ft).

=== Physiology ===
The single-cell organism has forms ranging from spherical to ovoid, and the color varies from grass green to dark green, although in water they may appear to be silver, teal, or even blackish. This is determined by the quantity of chloroplasts of the specimen. The extremely smooth surface of the cell shines like glass when clean.

Valonia ventricosa is among the largest known single-celled organisms. Its thallus consists of a thin-walled, tough, multinucleate cell with a diameter that ranges typically from 1 to 4 centimetres (0.4 to 1.6 in), although it may achieve a diameter of up to 5.1 centimetres (2.0 in) in rarer cases. The "bubble" alga is attached by rhizoids to the substrate fibers.

== Studies ==
Valonia ventricosa has been studied particularly because the cells are so unusually large that they provide a convenient subject for studying the transfer of water and water-soluble molecules across biological membranes. It has been concluded that the properties of permeability in both osmosis and diffusion were identical, and that urea and formaldehyde molecules did not require any kind of postulated water-filled pores in the membrane to move through it.

In study of the cellulose lattice and its orientation in biological structures, Valonia ventricosa has undergone extensive X-ray analytical procedures. It has also been studied for its electrical properties because of its unusually high electrical potential relative to the seawater that surrounds it.

== In aquaria ==
Valonia ventricosa is considered a pest by some aquarium owners, as it can reproduce quickly and potentially endanger the health of fish or other organisms.

== See also ==
- Xenophyophorea
