= E. Yale Dawson =

American botanist and taxonomist

Elmer Yale Dawson
- Born: March 31, 1918; Creston, Iowa
- Died: June 22, 1966 (aged 48); Red Sea near Hurghada, Egypt
- Citizenship: United States
- Education: University of California, Berkeley
- Scientific career
- Fields: Botany, Phycology, Taxonomy, Ecology, Natural History
- Institutions: University of Southern California; Beaudette Foundation; Charles Darwin Foundation; Smithsonian Institution; San Diego Natural History Museum

Elmer Yale Dawson (March 31, 1918 – June 22, 1966) was an American botanist, phycologist, taxonomist, ecologist, and naturalist writer. He popularized science and natural history with his books and articles on topics ranging from California cacti and North American cacti, to California seashore plants and marine algae, desert plant ecology, salt marsh wetlands, and anthropology topics including ethnohistory and ethnobiology of Seri Native American Indian culture of the northern Gulf of California.

== Biography ==
Dawson was born in on March 31, 1918, in Creston, Iowa, to Elmer Clarence Dawson and Mabelle Davidson Campbell. The family moved west to Los Angeles County, California, residing in a home in the City of Long Beach as a boy and during his teen years, just a few blocks from the Pacific Ocean. He grew cacti in the family backyard, and even salvaged a large Saguaro Cactus from near the Colorado River, where a new dam would soon flood the habitat and drown this cactus. The Saguaro was brought in a truck to their home in Long Beach, where the Saguaro lived for several years, before succumbing to the high coastal humidity and too much rainfall for the roots.

In 1940 he received his bachelor's degree from the University of California, Berkeley, and in 1942 his Ph.D. from the same institution. After serving in the United States Army, he became a research associate for the Allan Hancock Foundation, a division of University of Southern California for 10 years, 1945 to 1955. He was appointed professor of biology at USC in 1956, a position that he held till 1964. From 1958 to 1962 he worked as research director of the Beaudette Foundation, a division of Biological research. He was director of the San Diego Natural History Museum from 1963 to 1965; in 1964, he became secretary of the Charles Darwin Foundation, located on the Galápagos Islands. In 1965, he accepted the newly established position of Curator of Cryptogamic Botany at the Smithsonian Institution's National Museum of Natural History.

He drowned on June 22, 1966, while diving for marine algae (seaweed) in the Red Sea near Hurghada.

In 1968, the noteworthy marine biologist and oceanographer, Joel Hedgpeth reflected in a narrative passage on the professional career of E. Yale Dawson in Between Pacific Tides, by Ed Ricketts and Jack Calvin (Stanford University Press). The passage was written just one year after the death of Dawson in the fourth edition of the book, in the annotated bibliography (page 455): "I first met Yale Dawson in W. A. Setchell's laboratory; the old Master had found a student worthy of the torch and was in a mellow mood. I suppose he hoped that his disciple would eventually inherit his chair; but that did not come to pass, and Yale finally wound up at the Smithsonian, which alas, was to be his last job. He died in action, appropriately enough, but that does not mean we shall miss him less. We can ill spare our good naturalists."

== Legacy ==
He devoted his life to a study of cacti since his youth, and then as an adult, he added the study of benthic marine algae, particularly Rhodophyta that grow in tropical and subtropical Pacific. He published books about algae, cacti, and succulents.
