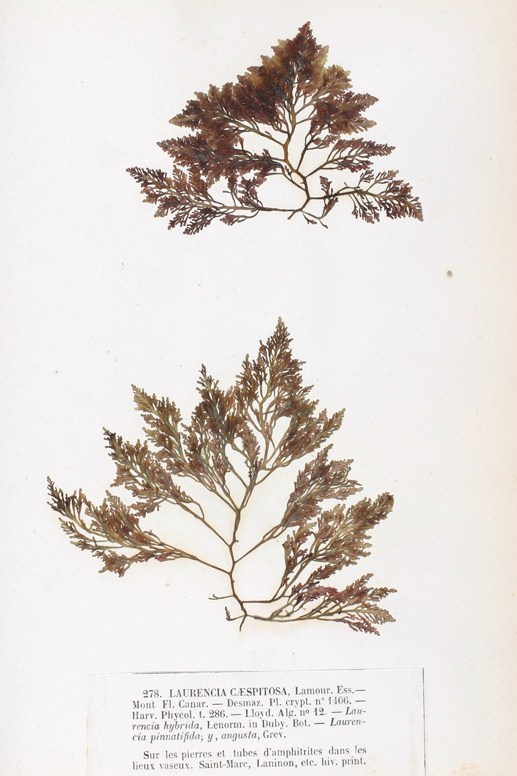
- Osmundea Hyprida

Scientific classification
- Clade: Archaeplastida
- Division: Rhodophyta
- Class: Florideophyceae
- Order: Ceramiales
- Family: Rhodomelaceae
- Genus: Osmundea
- Species: O. hybrida

Binomial name
- Osmundea hybrida (A.P.de Candolle) K.W.Nam

Synonyms
- Fucus hybridus A.P.de Candolle 1805; Laurencia hybrida (A.P.de Candolle) T.Lestiboudois 1827; Laurencia caespitosa var. subsimplex Montagne; Fucus pinnatifidus var. angustus Turner 1802; Laurencia caespitosa J.V.Lamouroux 1813; Laurencia pinnatifida var. angusta (Turner) Greville 1830

= Osmundea hybrida =

Species of alga

Osmundea hybrida is a fairly small marine red alga.

== Description ==
Osmundea hybrida is small branched alga which grows from a holdfast to 15 mm long. The axes show a main axis with branches which may be spiral or irregular. The main axis may be slightly compressed with a medulla of cells surrounded by a cortex deep purplish-brown in colour. A small circular pit occurs at the apex of the branches.

== Habitat ==
Common but not as common as Osmundea pinnatifida. Epilithic in the littoral on stones, rock and on limpets.

== Reproduction ==
Spermatangial receptacles, where the male gametes occur in small cups, are at the end of the side branches. Cystocarps are spherical and sessile and tetraspores are produced in small branchlets.

== Distribution ==
This alga is to be found all around the British Isles as far north as Shetland. Further south it is recorded to Portugal.
