= Edith Jordan Gardner =

American educator and activist

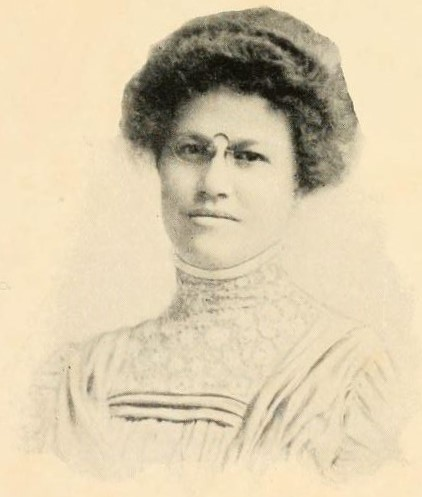
- Edith Monica Jordan in 1909
- Born: Edith Monica Jordan; February 17, 1877; Indianapolis, Indiana, U.S.
- Died: June 16, 1965 (aged 88); Redwood City, California, U.S.
- Education: Stanford University (BA); Cornell University (MA)
- Occupations: Educator; Suffragist; Social activist
- Spouse: Nathaniel Lyon Gardner (m. 1915; died 1937)
- Partner(s): Edward Berwick, Jr. (1909)
- Father: David Starr Jordan

Edith Monica Jordan Gardner (February 17, 1877 – June 16, 1965) was an American educator, specialized in history and an activist, including woman's suffrage and in the Sierra Club. She was president of the Southern California Social Science Association, Town and Gown Club, Cornell Women's Club of Northern California, Stanford Woman's Club, and the University of California branch of the Equal Suffrage League, among others. She was the head of the History Department at the John H. Francis Polytechnic High School, chairman of the Department of Legislation Oakland Forum, and one of the earliest members of the Sierra Club.

== Early life ==
Edith Monica Jordan was born on February 17, 1877, in Indianapolis, Indiana, the daughter of Dr. David Starr Jordan (1851–1931) and Susan Bowen (1845–1885). Her father was an ichthyologist and the first president of Stanford University.

She grew up mostly in Indiana, spending her first two years of life in Indianapolis while her father served as professor of natural history at North Western Christian University (which later became Butler University). In 1879, she moved to Bloomington when her father was first appointed professor of zoology and later president of Indiana University. Her mother died when she was eight. At the age of 14, she left Indiana for California when her father was appointed president of Stanford University in 1891.

At the age of 16, she enrolled at Stanford as a freshman and joined the Kappa Alpha Theta sorority in 1893. In 1896, she was elected second vice-president of her senior class at Stanford University and graduated in 1897 at the age of 20 with a degree in history. She then obtained a master's degree at Cornell University in 1901. She was a member of the Phi Beta Kappa and of the alumni club of the Kappa Alpha Theta.

In 1905, Edith Jordan accompanied her father during a months long stay in Europe, visiting leading universities to learn about their management. When her father had to return to California in September 1905, Edith Jordan remained in London, intending to travel to Italy and return in December 1905.

In 1907, she acted as representative of Stanford University during official university events: that June, she presented the championship banner and the Stanford Cup to the Anaheim High School.

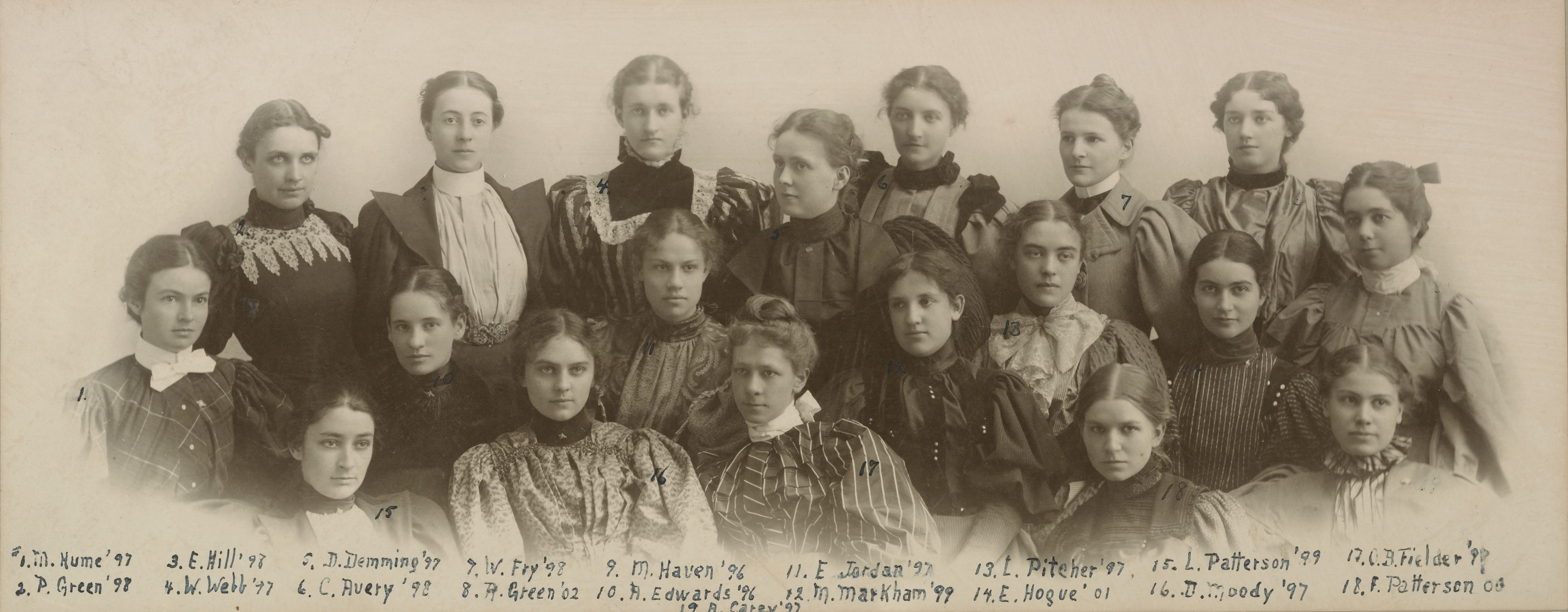
from top left to right: 1) Hume, M., 2) Green, P., 3) Hill, Edith, 4) Webb, Winnifred, 5) Demming, Daisy, 6) Avery, C., 7) Fry, W., 8) Green, Ruby, 9) Haven, Martha, 10) Edwards, Ada, 11) Jordan, Edith, 12) Markham, M., 13) Pitcher, L., 14) Hogue, Elizabeth, 15) Patterson, Letitia, 16) Moody, Ora, 17) Fielder, Ortha Belle, 18) Patterson, Frances, 19) Carey, A.

== Career ==
Old, neoclassical campus of Polytechnic High near LA's historic core, 1905

=== Educator and education activist ===
Gardner began her professional life as high school teacher of history and drew from personal experiences to make her lessons appealing. As an history teacher, she mixed archeology, art, architecture and travel to her lessons to make them more alive and interesting:

I feel that in order to understand history, we must bring to life the people of the period studied and in order to do this, we must be able to grasp the environment of these people. We can best do this by a study of the literature and art of their time. We must know, not only their political happenings, but something of their agriculture, their society, their commerce.

Her pupils found her teaching so effective that they cited her words instead of those of textbooks during examinations. Early in her career, she taught at the Marlborough Preparatory School in Los Angeles and was a mathematics teacher at the Salinas High School. She then spent a year between 1908 and 1909 in London, England, to develop her history skills. From 1909 to 1915, Jordan was the head of the History Department at the Los Angeles Polytechnic High School, where she had taught for several years prior. She was one of the school's most prominent teachers and was also in charge of the visitors' day at the school. In the 1910s, Polytechnic was the first school to offer studies in multiple class subjects, which is now modeled by many high schools, as "periods".

As early as 1902, she was also interested in shaping the education system within the state of California. As a young school teacher at Salinas High School in 1902, she presented a paper, "The History Note Book", at a statewide meeting of the California Teachers Association condemning the use of the controversial "note-book system" in high schools as it pertained as an entrance requirement to Stanford University. Jordan claimed the notebook added interest to textbook work, but it was sometimes overestimated as a requirement for entrance to universities. In the 1910s, she was a member of the executive committee of the High School Teachers' Association and hosted its meetings at her own residence. In 1914, she was elected president of the Southern California Social Science Association. After she retired, she remained involved with the American Historical Association, like when, in 1917, she opened the College Teachers' session with the essay: "The relation between high-school history and freshman history."

=== Other activism ===
In November 1913, she undertook a one-month trip in Egypt, following the Nile, with Benjamin Ide Wheeler, president of the University of California, and his wife. She then continued alone to India, and then, with another teacher at Poly, Mary Putnam, they visited Montenegro, the then Federated Malay States, and Kuala Lumpur (where no American woman had been before them) and returned to the United States in February 1914. Once home, she gave a highly appreciated talk on the meaning of the flag to an American abroad during the George Washington's birthday celebrations.

In November 1914, she was among the "prominent and active" women who hosted Lou Henry Hoover while she campaigned for work relief toward the Belgian population at the California Club; Jordan said of Hoover: "She is the most capable woman alive."

She was the chairman of the Department of Legislation Oakland Forum and a member of the Oakland Forum of the League of Women Voters. While she was a young teacher and high school department head living and working in Los Angeles in 1910, Jordan was also the president of the Berkeley-based University of California branch of the College Equal Suffrage League and addressed the subject of Women's suffrage in the United States at women's conventions. To attend suffrage meetings that were held regularly in Berkeley, she had to travel approximately 370 miles in each direction by steam-powered railroad from her home in Los Angeles.

She was the president of the Town and Gown Club, which was founded in 1898 by Emmanuel Marie Paget. The clubwomen were active in the social life of the community and involved in environmental issues. In 1907, Jordan became involved in environmental preservation as one of the earliest members of the Sierra Club and by promoting natural walks to her students.

Gardner was also a member of the Berkeley City Club, Oakland Club, Friday Morning Club, College Woman's Club of Los Angeles, on the board of directors of the Stanford Club of the Eastbay, and president of the Cornell Women's Club of Northern California and of the Stanford Woman's Club.

In 1920, she was among the supporters of Herbert Hoover as a member of the Berkeley Hoover Republican Club.

In 1928, she was included in the book Women of the West; a series of biographical sketches of living eminent women in the eleven western states of the United States of America, showcasing the few hundreds women that in the 1920s were prominent in frontier lands.

She was a public vocational speaker on world affairs. In 1932, she addressed the East Bay Stanford Women's Club on the political situation in India. In 1940, she spoke in front of the Lake Arrowhead Women's Club on her traveling experience on Balkan countries, the then Yugoslavia, Hungary and Romania. This talk covered tourist topics and social issues.

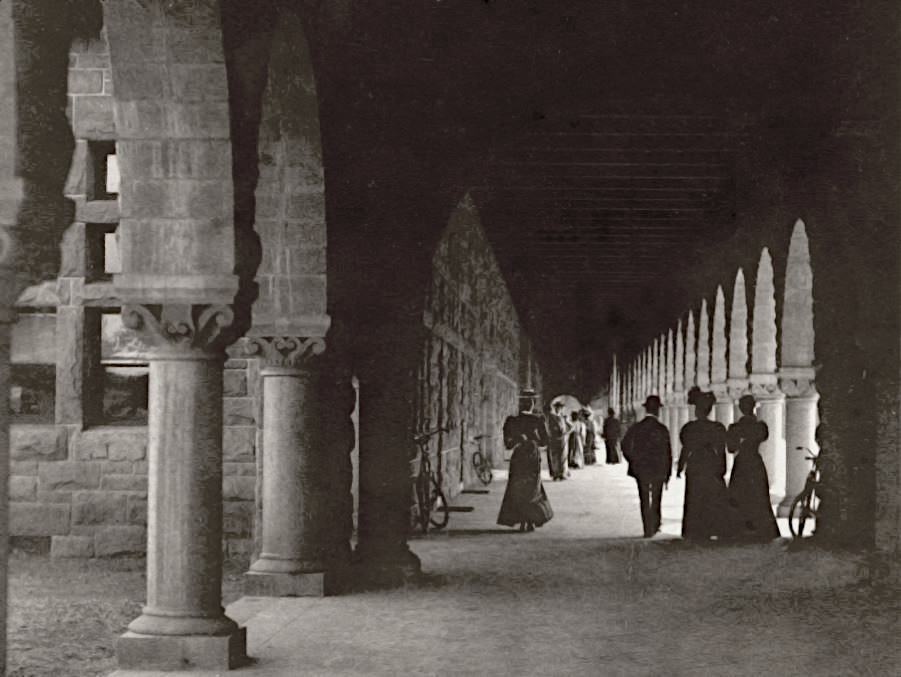
Center of the Stanford campus in 1891.

Her 1961 unpublished manuscript, "The days of Edith Jordan Gardner", is preserved at the Stanford University Archives and is used are reference material by other authors, like Harriet Kofalk for "No woman tenderfoot: Florence Merriam Bailey, pioneer naturalist".

Being one of the last surviving persons who were present at Stanford University inauguration in 1891, in 1962 she was included in the essay "Stanford Mosaic", edited by Edith R. Mirrielees, collecting memoirs of people attending Stanford. The compilation began with Jordan's essay, "The University and I Were Young Together," which included one of her memories of how, as the only telephone on campus was at their home, she used to bring messages they received to the various professors at the university offices on the Quad.

== Personal life ==
Edith Jordan Gardner moved to Stanford, California, when her father was appointed president of Stanford University in 1891 and stayed with her parents until she had graduated from Stanford in 1897 and later moved to Los Angeles for a teaching position.

In 1909, she was engaged to Edward Berwick Jr. of Carmel. They met when both were students at Stanford. Both were well known in Los Angeles society. The engagement came as a surprise to their friends. Three weeks after the engagement was announced, Berwick was discovered dead of apparent natural causes in his parents' home in Pacific Grove, California, at the age of 34. Due to a winter storm that made roads impassable near Santa Barbara, both Edith Jordan and her father became stuck in transit and missed Berwick's funeral.

She had a summer house at Carmel-by-the-sea.

In 1915, she married Nathaniel Lyon Gardner (1864–1937), professor of botany at the University of California, Berkeley, and curator of the university herbarium. As botanist, he identified the Pacific marine algae. They met when Gardner was head of the department of biology at the Los Angeles Polytechnic High School while Jordan was head of the history department. They lived at 2901 Hillegass Avenue, Berkeley.

She died on June 16, 1965, in a convalescent home in Redwood City, California.
