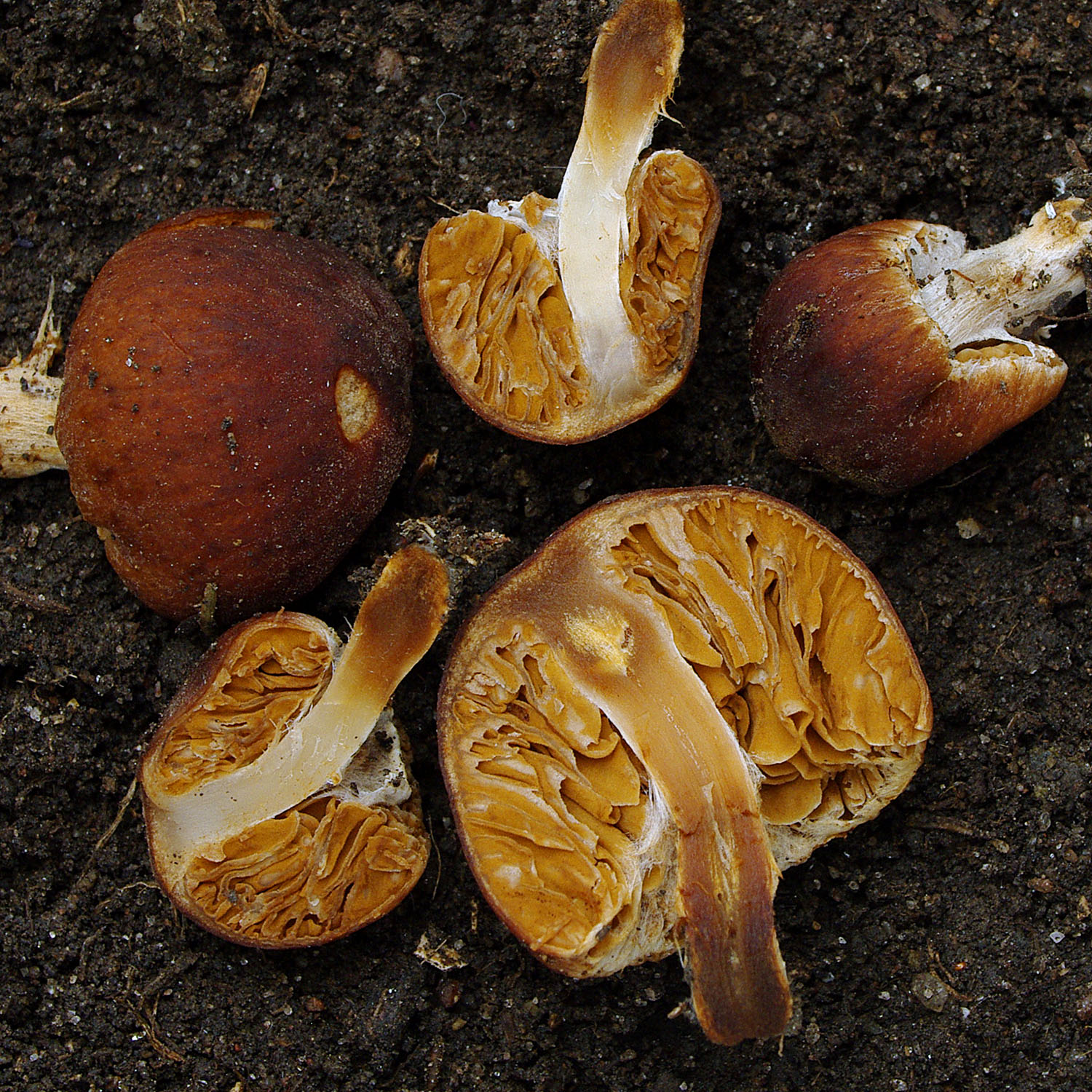
- Setchelliogaster species, tentatively identified as S. tenuipes

Scientific classification
- Kingdom: Fungi
- Division: Basidiomycota
- Class: Agaricomycetes
- Order: Agaricales
- Family: Bolbitiaceae
- Genus: Setchelliogaster; Pouzar (1958)

Type species
- Setchelliogaster tenuipes Pouzar (1958)

= Setchelliogaster =

Genus of fungi

Setchelliogaster is a genus of fungi in the order Agaricales. It is incertae sedis with respect to familial placement within the order, although Kirk and colleagues (Dictionary of the Fungi, 10th edition, 2008) consider it likely aligned with either the Bolbitiaceae or the Cortinariaceae. Species Fungorum class it as in the Bolbitiaceae family. The genus is widespread in warm, dry areas, originally containing five species, later degraded to 3 species. It was circumscribed by Czech mycologist Zdeněk Pouzar in 1958.

The genus name of Setchelliogaster is in honour of William Albert Setchell (1864–1943), who was an American botanist and marine phycologist who taught at the University of California, Berkeley, where he headed the Botany Department.

== Species ==
As accepted by Species Fungorum;

- Setchelliogaster aurantius (Zeller) Singer & A.H. Sm. (1959)
- Setchelliogaster tenuipes (Setch.) Pouzar (1958)
- Setchelliogaster tetrasporus Singer (1971)

Former species;

- S. australiensis G.W. Beaton, Pegler & T.W.K. Young (1985) = Descolea australiensis, Bolbitiaceae family
- S. brunneus (E. Horak) Singer (1971) = Descolea brunnea Bolbitiaceae
- S. fragilis (Zeller & C.W. Dodge) E. Horak (1980) = Cortinarius fragilis Cortinariaceae
- S. rheophyllus (Bertault & Malençon) G. Moreno & Kreisel (1997), = Setchelliogaster tenuipes
- S. tenuipes var. rheophyllus (Bertault & Malençon) G. Moreno & M.P. Martín (2001) = Setchelliogaster tenuipes
