= Giovanni Zanardini =

Italian phycologist (1804–1878)

Giovanni Antonio Maria Zanardini (12 June 1804, Venice – 24 April 1878) was an Italian medical doctor and botanist who specialized in the field of phycology.

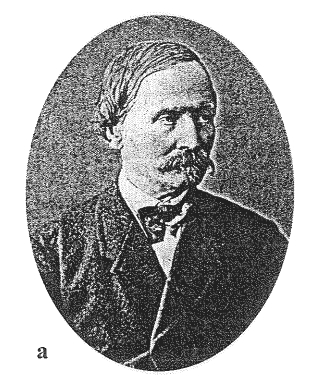
Giovanni Zanardini

In 1831 he obtained his medical doctorate from the University of Padua, followed by a degree in surgery and obstetrics from the University of Pavia three years later. During his career, he worked as a physician in Padua and Venice. For a period of time, he served as secretary of the Istituto Veneto Scienze e Lettere.

The algae genus Zanardinia (in class Phaeophyceae) is named after him, as are species with the epithet of zanardinii.

== Published works ==
- "Algae and related subjects - collected works", 1839.
- Notizie intorno alle cellulari marine delle lagune e de'litorali di Venezia, 1847.
- Prospetto della flora Veneta, 1847 - Prospectus of Venetian flora.
- "Plantarum in Mari Rubro hucusque collectarum enumerato (Juvante A. Figari)", 1858.
- Iconographia phycologica Adiratica : ossia, scelta di ficee nuove o piu rare del Mare Adriatico, 1860 - Iconography of Adriatic phycology.
- Iconographia phycologica mediterraneoadriatica ossia Scelta di ficee nuove o più rare dei mari mediterraneo ed adriatico, 1871 - Iconography of Mediterranean-Adriatic phycology.
- "Phycearum Indicarum pugillus", 1872.
