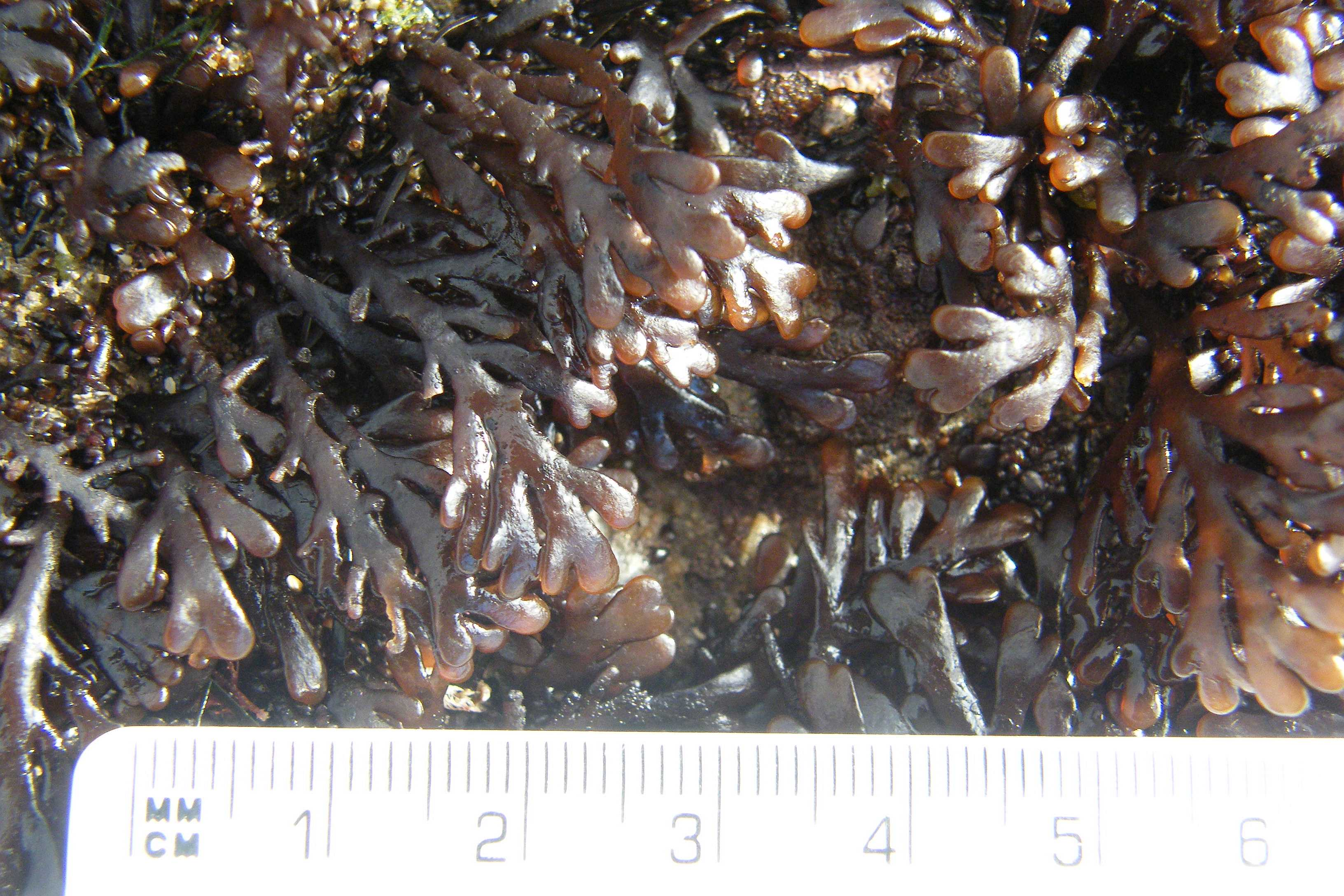

Scientific classification
- Clade: Archaeplastida
- Division: Rhodophyta
- Class: Florideophyceae
- Order: Ceramiales
- Family: Rhodomelaceae
- Genus: Osmundea; Stackhouse

= Osmundea =

Genus of algae

Osmundea is a genus of red algae in the family Rhodomelaceae.

== Selected Species ==
- Osmundea hybrida
- Osmundea pinnatifida
