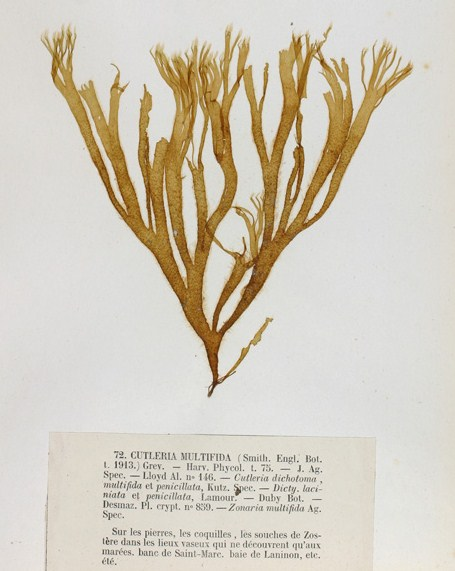
- Cutleria multifida

Scientific classification
- Domain: Eukaryota
- Clade: Diaphoretickes
- Clade: SAR
- Clade: Stramenopiles
- Phylum: Gyrista
- Subphylum: Ochrophytina
- Class: Phaeophyceae
- Order: Tilopteridales
- Family: Cutleriaceae
- Genus: Cutleria; Greville

= Cutleria (alga) =

Genus of brown algae

Cutleria is a genus of brown algae (class Phaeophyceae), one of 2–6 genera in the order Cutleriales. AlgaeBase recognises 11 species in the genus.

The genus was described circumscribed by Robert Kaye Greville in Algae Brit. Vol.44 on page 59 in 1830. The name of Cutleria is in honour of Catharine Cutler (who died 1866), an English botanist, who specialised in Marine Botany and worked in Sidmouth, Devon.
