= Nathaniel Lyon Gardner =

American phycologist and mycologist

- Born: February 26, 1864; Keokuk, Iowa, U.S.
- Died: August 15, 1937 (aged 73); Berkeley, California, U.S.
- Resting place: Mountain View Cemetery (Oakland, California)
- Education: Washington State Normal School; University of Washington (BS); UC Berkeley (MS, PhD)
- Known for: Curator of the University of California Herbarium
- Spouse: Edith Jordan
- Scientific career
- Fields: Phycology, mycology
- Workplaces: University of California, Berkeley
- Thesis: Cytological Studies in Cyanophyceae (1906)
- Doctoral advisor: William Albert Setchell
- Author abbrev. (botany): N.L.Gardner

Nathaniel Lyon Gardner (February 26, 1864 – August 15, 1937), was an American phycologist and mycologist who taught at the University of California, Berkeley, where he was the curator of the University Herbarium. He is known for his work on seaweeds of the Pacific Coast, as well as on freshwater algae and fungi, and among his publications is the important reference work Algae of Northwestern America.

== Early life and education ==
Gardner was born in Keokuk, Iowa on February 26, 1864, and began his career as an Iowa schoolteacher. After earning a teaching degree at the Washington State Normal School in Ellensburg (now Central Washington University), he went on to teach for a time in that state. He also began collecting plants, which led him to write to the University of California for help with identification and preservation of specimens. This put him in contact with William Albert Setchell, who headed the botany department at UC Berkeley (UCB) and later worked closely with Gardner as a colleague and coauthor via correspondence. Gardner enrolled at the University of Washington to complete at Bachelor of Science degree in 1900. Gardner subsequently enrolled at UCB to study marine algae and other cryptogams, earning a Bachelor of Science degree in 1900., a Master of Science degree in 1903, and a Doctor of Philosophy degree in 1906.

== Career ==
After receiving his Bachelor degree, Gardner was hired as an assistant in botany by UCB, where he worked with W. J. V. Osterhout. Upon completion of his doctoral studies in 1906, he began teaching at the Los Angeles Polytechnic High School, where he was head of biology. He took a year's leave from this job to serve as an acting assistant professor of botany at UCB (1909–10) and then was hired full-time by UCB as an assistant professor in 1913. He rose to associate professor in 1923 and retired from UCB in 1934. He was also the curator of the University Herbarium.

Gardner became known for his expertise in Pacific Coast seaweeds, as well as for his work with freshwater algae and fungi. He published extensively on the morphology and taxonomy of blue-green algae (on which he was recognized as a world authority) as well as red and brown algae. In addition to plant collecting and other kinds of field work, he developed special methods for cultivating algae in the lab. Although he often coauthored papers with Setchell, he also published some 30 solo-authored papers.

An important contribution to American botany was the multi-volume reference work Algae of Northwestern America, on which he collaborated with Setchell. Issued by the University of California Press, the first volume came out in 1903 and the last in 1925.

== Publications ==
- Cytological studies in Cyanophyceae. (Berkeley: University Press, 1906).
- Variations in Nuclear Extrusion Among the Facaceae. (Berkeley: University Press, 1910).
- Leuvenia, a New Genus of Flagellates. (Berkeley: University Press, 1910).
- The genus Fucus on the Pacific Coast of North America. (Berkeley: University of California Press, 1922).
- Algae of Northwestern America. Coauthored with William Albert Setchell. (Berkeley: University of California Press, 1903–25).
- The Marine Algae of the Pacific Coast of North America. Coauthored with William Albert Setchell. (Berkeley: University of California Press, 1919–25).
- New Pacific Coast Marine Algae, I-IV.
- Phycological Contributions, I-VII. Coauthored with William Albert Setchell. (Berkeley: University of California Press, 1920–24).

The standard author abbreviation N.L.Gardner is used to indicate this person as the author when citing a botanical name.

== Personal life ==
In 1915, Gardner married the educator Edith Jordan. They had met when they were both working at the Los Angeles Polytechnic High School, he as head of the biology department and she as head of the history department. Gardner died in his home in Berkeley on August 15, 1937.
