= William Albert Setchell =

American botanist and naturalist (1864–1943)

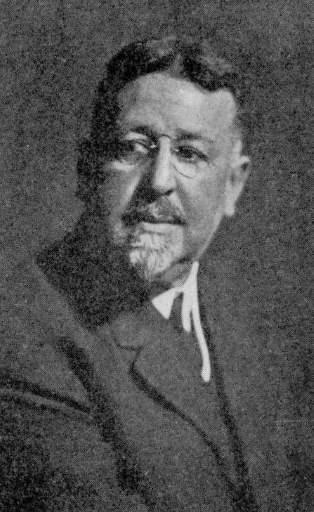
- c. 1915
- Born: April 15, 1864; Norwich, Connecticut, U.S.
- Died: April 5, 1943 (aged 78); Berkeley, California, U.S.
- Education: Yale University (BA); Harvard University (PhD)
- Scientific career
- Fields: Botany; Marine phycology
- Workplaces: University of California, Berkeley
- Author abbrev. (botany): Setch.

William Albert Setchell (April 15, 1864 – April 5, 1943) was an American botanist and marine phycologist who taught at the University of California, Berkeley, where he headed the Botany Department. Among his publications are the Phycotheca Boreali-Americana, a multi-volume specimen collection of dried algae, and the Algae of Northwestern America, a reference work.

== Education ==
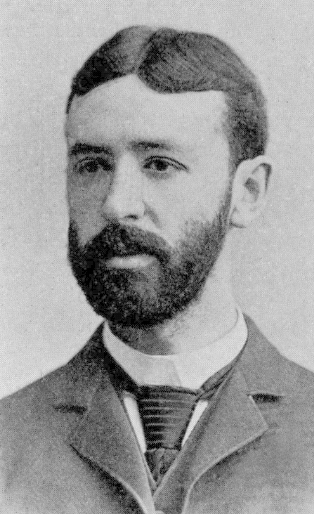
As a Yale undergraduate

Setchell was born in Norwich, Connecticut, to George Case Setchell and Mary Ann (Davis) Setchell. Setchell showed an early interest in natural history that was furthered during his years at the Norwich Free Academy. He went to Yale University as an undergraduate and to Harvard University for graduate work, where he studied with William Gilson Farlow, a specialist in cryptogams. He did his thesis work on the anatomy and morphology of kelps.

== Career ==
After completing his PhD in 1890, Setchell took a post at the Sheffield Scientific School of Yale University as an assistant in biology. He rose to become an assistant professor of botany, continuing his research on kelps, and during the summers he oversaw marine research at the Woods Hole Marine Biological Laboratory. In 1895, he moved to the University of California, Berkeley, as a full professor and head of the Department of Botany. He initiated a series of UC publications on botany and built up the University Herbarium and botanical gardens. He remained there until his retirement in 1934. Setchell was elected to the American Academy of Arts and Sciences in 1916 and both the American Philosophical Society and the United States National Academy of Sciences in 1919.

Setchell's research ranged from the taxonomy of algae, fungi, and some angiosperms to biogeography and ethnobotany, especially as these related to marine algae. His researches took him all around the world because of his interest in such subjects as the role of temperature in the worldwide distribution of algae and (in the 1920s) the role of kelps in reef formation. One side project grew out of his smoking habit: he became interested in the origins of the genus Nicotiana and did some research on Nicotiana hybrids.

One of his early major undertakings was a series of specimen collections, i.e. exsiccata series, that became collectively known by the title of the first volume, the Phycotheca Boreali-Americana. In the early 1890s, Setchell teamed up with botanists Frank Shipley Collins and Isaac Holden to create specimen collections of dried North American freshwater and marine algae. Each collection was mounted on pages bound together in a book form, with printed labels and an index, and issued in an edition of 80. Published in installments between 1895 and 1919, the exsiccata Phycotheca Boreali-Americana ultimately totaled 46 bound fascicles (I–XLVI, numbers 1–2300) and 5 elephant folio volumes (fascicles A–E, numbers I–CXXV). The regular volumes each contained 50 numbered specimens, while the elephant folios contained 25 specimens. In collecting the thousands of specimens needed for this monumental project, the trio relied on many other plant collectors.

Possibly his most important contribution to American botany was the multi-volume reference work Algae of Northwestern America, on which he collaborated with fellow UC Berkeley botanist Nathaniel Lyon Gardner. Issued by the University of California Press, the first volume came out in 1903 and the last in 1925.

Following his retirement, Setchell continued to work on botanical projects until his death at his home in Berkeley on April 5, 1943. A Festschrift was produced for his 70th birthday that included essays, a biographical sketch, and a complete bibliography. His manuscripts, notes, field books, and correspondence are archived at the University of California.

== Publications ==
- "Concerning the Life-History of Saccorhiza dermatodea, (De la Pyl.) J. Ag." Proceedings of the American Academy of Arts and Sciences 26 (1890): 177-217.
- Phycotheca Boreali-Americana. Coauthored with F. S. Collins and Isaac Holden. 1895–1919.
- Algae of Northwestern America. Coauthored with Nathaniel Lyon Gardner. 1903–1925.
- The Marine Algae of the Pacific Coast of North America. Coauthored with Nathaniel Lyon Gardner. (Berkeley: University of California Press, 1919-1925).
- Phycological Contributions, I-VII. Coauthored with Nathaniel Lyon Gardner. (Berkeley: University of California Press, 1920–24).

== Personal life ==
In 1920, Setchell married Clara B. Caldwell of Providence, Rhode Island. She assisted him at the university and accompanied him on all his trips until her death in 1934.

== Plants named for Setchell ==
Three plant genera were named for Setchell: Setchellia Magnus 1896, (a smut fungus) which is now a synonym of Doassansia Cornu, Setchelliella De Toni (now Doassansia niesslii De Toni, a species of blue-green algae). Also, Setchellanthus Brandegee, (a Mexican shrub, containing a single species, Setchellanthus caeruleus). In 1958, Czech mycologist Zdeněk Pouzar published Setchelliogaster which is a genus of fungi in the order Agaricales. In addition, more than three dozen species of plants, as well as a coral species and an annelid species, were also named in his honor.
