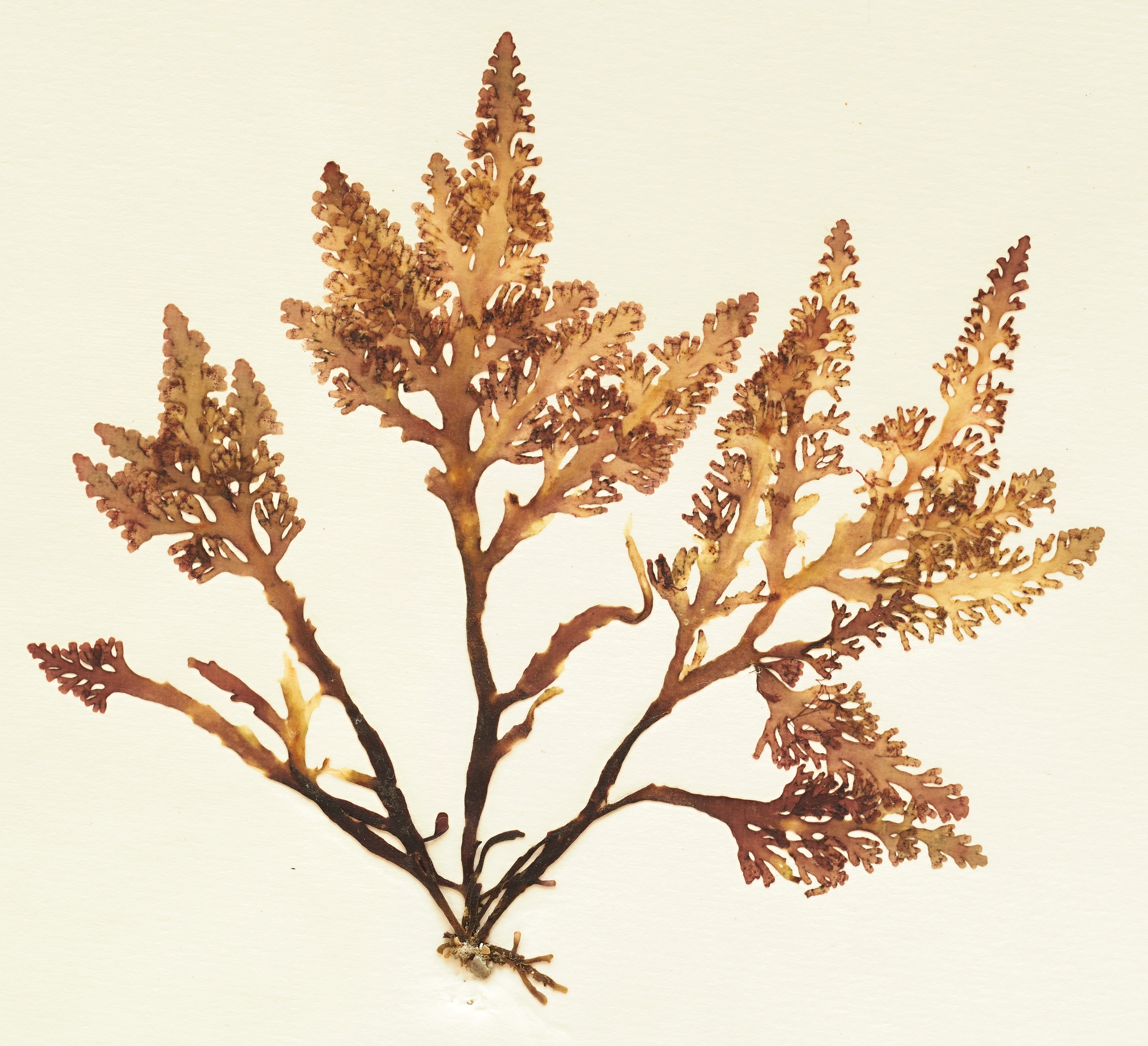

Scientific classification
- Domain: Eukaryota
- Clade: Archaeplastida
- Division: Rhodophyta
- Class: Florideophyceae
- Order: Ceramiales
- Family: Rhodomelaceae
- Genus: Osmundea
- Species: O. pinnatifida

Binomial name
- Osmundea pinnatifida (Hudson) Stackhouse

Synonyms
- Laurencia pinnatifida

= Osmundea pinnatifida =

Species of alga

Osmundea pinnatifida is a species of red alga known by the common name pepper dulse.

It is a small seaweed widely found in the tidal zone of moderately sheltered rocky shores around Europe. Although technically a red seaweed, it can show a wide range of colouring from yellow-buff to a red so dark as to be almost black.

== Description ==
Osmundea pinnatifida is a small marine alga which grows in tufts with branches to a length of 8 cm from a discoid holdfast which produces stolons for further support. The fronds are flattened with a medulla of thick cells covered by a cortex of 2 layers. The branches are alternate, flattened and branching in one plane from the sides one or two times. The axes show a small terminal groove at the apex.

== Reproduction ==
The frond bears spermatangial receptacles which release the male gametes on final branchlets. Cystocarps, the cells which surround the gametophyte, grow on the ultimate branches. Tetraspores are formed on the last three orders of branches.

== Habitat ==
Common growing as tufts on rock in rock pools in the lower littoral but never below low tide.

== Distribution ==
Common around Ireland, Great Britain including Shetland and south to Portugal and the Mediterranean.

== Uses ==
In Ireland, like most seaweeds, it is harvested quite a lot. It is often used in gin-making in northwestern Ireland. It is harvested and dried in Scotland and in the Channel Islands for use as a curry-flavoured spice.
