= Clean-up crew =

Aquarist term for small cleaner animals

Among aquarists and vendors, the clean-up crew is various small animals commonly sold to keep reef aquariums clear of pest algae, detritus and parasites.

Among the most popular are blue-legged hermit crabs, scarlet hermit crabs, emerald crabs and various snails. Others include limpets, sea hares, sea urchins, brittle stars, algae-eating combtooth blennies, neon gobies, reef lobsters, cleaner shrimp, mysid shrimp, copepods, ostracods, isopods and amphipods. Even peppermint shrimp that feed on pest Aiptasia anemones are often included. Sometimes it includes shallow sediment-dwelling animals that live in the deep sand bed of marine aquariums or reef aquariums such as sand sifting starfish, spaghetti worms, bristleworms and flatworms.

Clean-up crews have also more recently been used in freshwater aquariums to control algae, detritus and pest snails. These often include various snails, shrimp, small crayfish, Gammarus and Hyalella amphipods, Asellus isopods, Cyclops copepods, ostracods, Planaria flatworms, California blackworms, sludge worms, Loricariid and Corydoras catfish, loaches, log suckers and siamese algae-eaters.

The term clean-up crew, along with custodian, has also been used for various arthropods, primarily a few established lines of terrestrial woodlice and springtails, used in terrarium clean up since the late 1990s. The two most popular have long been the Spanish orange Porcellio sp. (often falsely labeled P. scaber) and a moderately large and prolific entomobryid known as the "giant" springtail. These small workers help to keep various small animal enclosures (for dart frogs, salamanders, centipedes, whipspiders, etc.) clear of decomposing food particles that otherwise can result in mold growth, mite infestations, or oxygen depletion from decomposition. Other terrarium clean-up crew inhabitants include various millipedes, soil mites, cockroaches, earthworms, whiteworms, bean weevils, crickets, darkling beetles, ladybirds, firebrats, sun beetles and skin beetles.

== See also ==
- Biological pest control
- Live sand
- Live food
- Coral sand
- Sand
- Live rock
- Algae eater
- Filter (aquarium)
- Vermicompost
- Bioactive terrarium
