= Deep sand bed =

Filtration method for aquariums

A deep sand bed is a filtration method used in some saltwater aquariums and some freshwater aquariums. A deep sand bed, similar to the Berlin Method, is designed to cultivate anaerobic bacteria in the bottom layers of sand, converting nitrate to nitrogen gas to remove toxic nitrates.

== Operation ==
A deep sand bed is commonly defined as a bed of fine sand with a minimum depth of four to six inches which ensures that a portion of the sand at the bottom will not be exposed to significant circulation of water. An established deep sand bed consists of sand populated with bacteria, algae and other marine organisms such as worms, crabs, snails and stars. The creatures burrow and overturn the top two to three inches of sand in search of food, which causes water to circulate deeper in the sand than it would if the creatures were not present.

Deep sand beds may be made of a variety of materials, but typically fine or "superfine" sand is used, with a grain size between 1 mm and 0.05 mm. A larger particle size increases circulation, which in turn requires greater depth to establish anaerobic areas. Larger particles can also inhibit the burrowing of small animals, which would limit circulation into the bed. Additionally, larger particles (2 mm or larger) are prone to detritus accumulation, which necessitates periodic siphon cleaning.

== See also ==
- Coral sand
- Filter (aquarium)
- Live rock
- Live sand
- Reef aquarium
