= Calcium reactor =

A calcium reactor is an efficient method to supply calcium and trace elements to a reef aquarium. Reactors may be used in elaborate freshwater and brackish aquariums where freshwater clams and other invertebrates need a constant supply of calcium.

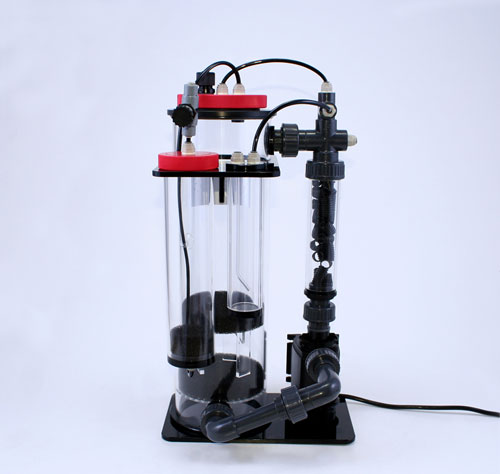
Calcium reactor

In marine and reef aquariums, a calcium reactor dissolves a calcium carbonate media in order to balance alkalinity and introduce other trace elements. An acidic solution is produced by injecting carbon dioxide into a reaction chamber with salt water and calcium rich media. The carbon dioxide lowers the pH by producing a solution high in carbonic acid, and dissolves calcium. This solution is recirculated through the reaction chamber via a recirculating pump. The effluent, which is now rich in elements from the dissolved media, is returned to the reef aquarium where the elements are consumed by organisms, primarily corals when building skeletons.

The reactor dissolves the calcium-laden media to provide bicarbonates HCO^{−}_{3} (alkalinity) and calcium (Ca^{2+}) ions at the same rate as consumed during calcification. Effectively dissolving the media requires an acidic pH. Saltwater may have a pH of 7.8 or higher, so to reduce the pH carbon dioxide (CO_{2}) is used. The reaction formula is:

CaCO_{3} + H_{2}O + CO_{2} ⇌ Ca^{2+} + 2 HCO^{−}_{3}

Inside the reaction chamber, a calcium rich media (aragonite), mainly CaCO_{3}, is forced into contact with water injected with carbon dioxide (CO_{2}) in order to create carbonic acid (H_{2}CO_{3}). This increases the solubility of the calcium carbonate. The reaction frees the calcium and carbonate, supplying the aquarium with water rich in Ca^{2+} and CO^{2−}_{3}, important for maintaining alkalinity and calcium levels.

A bubble counter is used to visually (or audibly) measure the carbon dioxide rate (bubbles per minute). The flow rate of carbon dioxide is monitored so that the dissolved gas goes into the solution, with a minimum unconsumed. A needle valve or solenoid valve generally attached to the CO_{2} regulator regulates the CO_{2} bubble rate. Valves with precise adjustment abilities improve bubble control.

A feed pump takes aquarium water into the reactor, controlling the volume of water exchange. This is important because a high rate of water flow into the reactor can reduce its efficiency, thus resulting in underproduction and a waste of CO_{2}.

Some reactors siphon water into the input of the reactor's recirculation pump. A potential complication is the medium in the reactor becoming compacted, increasing back pressure onto the pump and reducing water into the reactor. Placing a gate or needle valve on the reactor's outlet side will improve flow characteristics compared to control from the inlet side.

Peristaltic pumps are effective operating against pressure, capable of supplying an adjustable and continuous flow over flow rates with minimal maintenance.

A pH controller is recommended to control the CO_{2}. It works by connecting to the CO_{2} regulator on the CO_{2} tank and measuring the pH of the solution inside the reactor via a pH probe. The controller will turn on and off the flow of CO_{2} based on the pH inside the reactor. The pH range for the typical calcium reactor is 6.5 to 6.8. When the pH rises above a certain level, a valve opens, allowing carbon dioxide to enter the reactor. The controller closes the valve as the pH falls below this level.

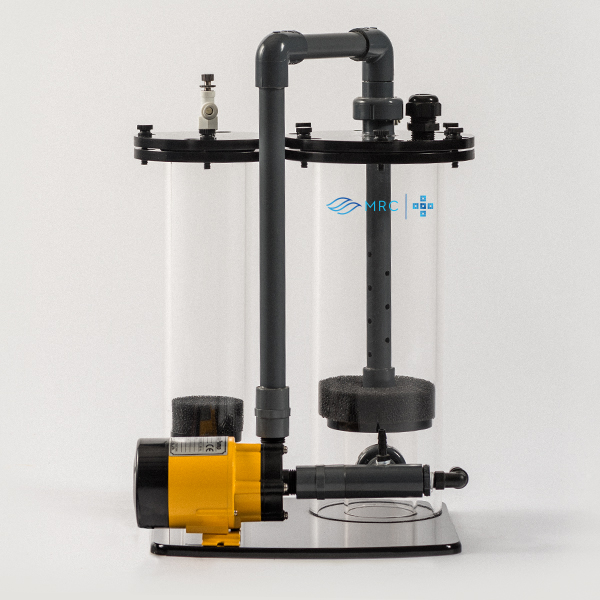
Dual-chambered calcium reactor

Some pH controllers have an interface for an air pump. This air pump is connected to an airstone in the sump or main tank. If the probe detects a low pH level, the pump activates. The bubbles raise the pH by dissipating the CO_{2} gas.

Since the pH inside the reactor is much lower than the pH in the aquarium, you run the risk of lowering the aquarium pH by running a calcium reactor if that low pH is not mitigated. To counteract that effect, many manufacturers offer reactors with secondary buffering chambers. This buffering chamber is filled with the same media as the primary chamber; however, no CO_{2} is injected into this chamber. The effluent of the primary chamber passes through the buffering chamber, consuming any excess CO_{2} and raising the pH of the solution, prior to entering the aquarium.

== See also ==
- Aquarium
- Protein skimmer
- Filter
