= Substrate (aquarium) =

Material used on the tank bottom of an aquarium

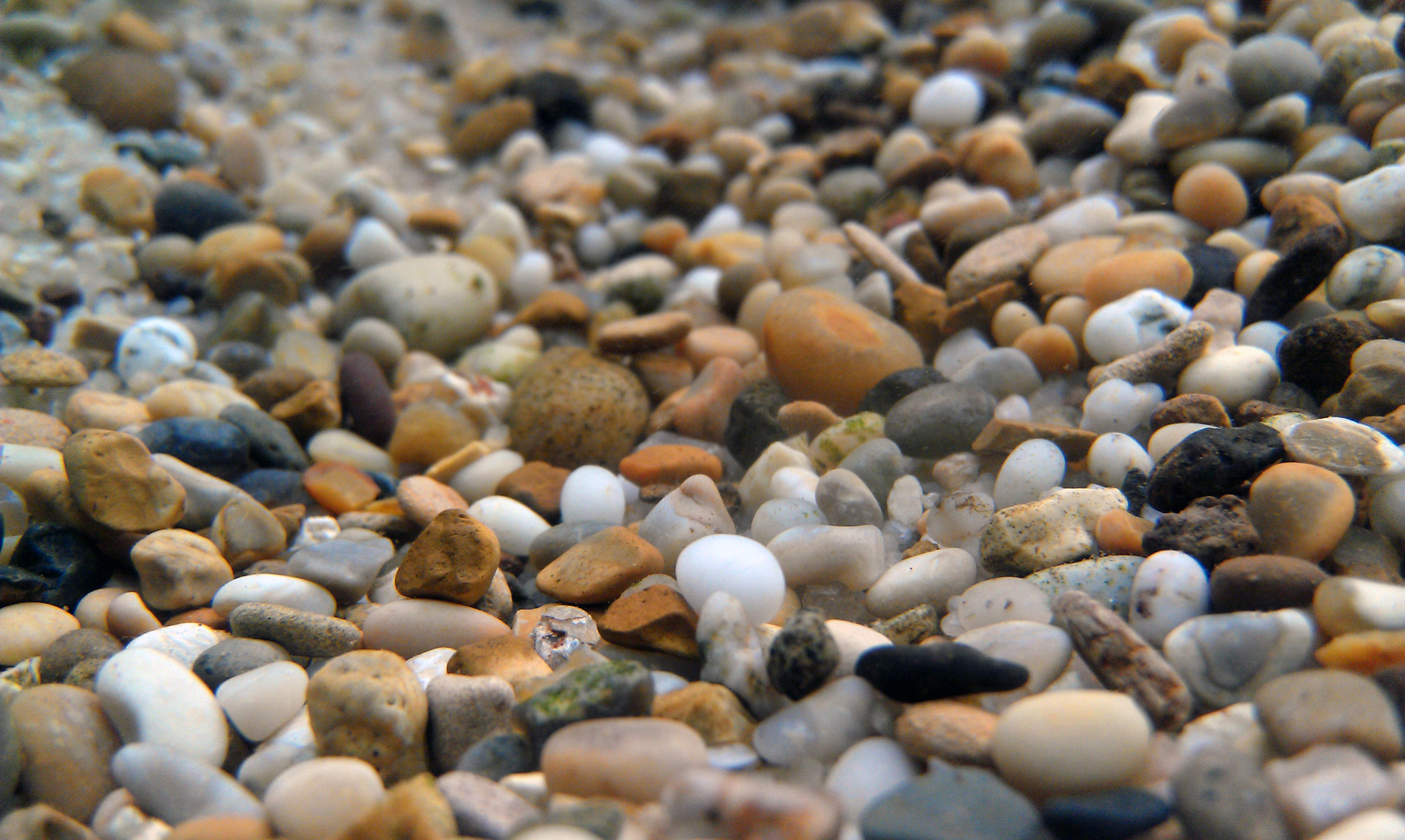
Gravel in a freshwater aquarium

The substrate of an aquarium refers to the material used on the tank bottom. It can affect water chemistry, filtration, and the well-being of the aquarium's inhabitants and is also an important part of the aquarium's aesthetic appeal. The appropriate substrate depends on the type of aquarium; the most important parameter is whether the aquarium contains fresh water or saltwater.

== Functions and considerations ==
Substrates are added to most aquaria mainly to increase beneficial bacteria. However, substrates can also directly affect water quality by releasing substances into the water, absorbing substances from it, or chemically reacting with substances from other sources. Additionally, substrates can have indirect effects on a system’s health; for example, dark-colored substrates are considered by some to be better for fish because they make the fish appear more colorful and less likely to behave timidly. Apart from all other considerations, substrates are frequently chosen for their aesthetic qualities.

Some substrates are used to alter the chemistry of water. Crushed coral and coral sand both contain calcium carbonate, which will raise the carbonate hardness and buffer the pH. Peat may be used in some aquaria to mimic some soft water habitats.

Substrate may also be used as part of a biological filtration system. Beneficial bacteria colonize all aquarium surfaces exposed to aerated water, including the substrate. Due to their numerous particles and high surface area, substrates are often used in biological filtration. Some common types of filtration involving the substrate include the undergravel filter and the deep sand bed.

Planted tanks require a substrate that will remain loose enough for plant roots to penetrate it. The substrate should be chemically inert and free of sharp edges. Fine gravel (1–2 mm) is preferred by some aquarists because coarser substrates allow debris to settle within the gaps between grains, which is particularly difficult to clean in a planted aquarium. Sloping the substrate so it is shallowest in front accommodates larger plants with correspondingly bigger root systems in the back. The substrate for plants should be at least 5 cm (2 in) deep. Often, a lower layer of richer substrate—such as potting soil, peat, vermiculite, or certain types of clay—is used as a source of iron and trace elements for plant roots.

In breeding tanks for egg-scattering species, a layer of marbles is sometimes used as a substrate, allowing the eggs to fall into the gaps between the marbles where the parents cannot eat them. Quarantine tanks (sometimes called hospital tanks) often use no substrate at all. This helps keep the aquarium as clean as possible and makes it easier to monitor fish excrement.

Fish of the species Pelvicachromis taeniatus were shown to be able to recognize olfactory traces left behind by substrate, even in clear water; highlighting that the presence of substrate is important for fish kept in tanks. This method is beneficial because it increases fish activity drastically in empty tanks.

== Types of substrate ==
=== Gravel ===
For freshwater aquaria, gravel is the most common substrate. To prevent damage to fish, gravel should not be sharp. Aquarium gravel can be as coarse as pea-sized or as fine as 1–2 mm. It is available in a number of colors, and may be naturally colored or dyed, and may have a polymer seal to ensure it does not affect water chemistry. Gravel sold specifically for use in aquaria is chemically inert. It is commonly composed of quartz or other lime-free minerals. If the gravel is rough or sharp, it is not suitable for bottom-dwelling fish that like to sift the substrate or dig. When growing aquatic plants, the Cation Exchange Capacity (CEC) is also an important thing to consider when choosing a substrate. CEC is the ability to absorb positively charged nutrient ions (so high CEC is good). This means the substrate will hold nutrients and make them available for the plant roots. It does not indicate the amount of nutrients the substrate contains.

=== Minerals, Shells and Corals ===
Shell grit, crushed limestone, crushed marble, crushed coral skeletons, coral sand, and oolitic aragonite substrates are possible choices. Because calcium carbonate, the primary component of these substrates, increases water hardness and pH, these are used most often for hard water species, such as those for African rift lake cichlids or for saltwater fish and invertebrates. Some invertebrates such as mollusks or stony corals also use the calcium and strontium released. Calcium carbonate substrates are poorly suited to aquaria housing most other freshwater aquarium fish, particularly river species, which are adapted to soft water.

=== Peat ===
Peat, or decomposed plant matter, is used most commonly in soft water or blackwater river systems, such as those mimicking the Amazon River basin. In addition to being soft in texture and therefore suitable for demersal (bottom-dwelling) species such as Corydoras catfish, peat is reported to have a number of other beneficial functions in freshwater aquaria. It softens water by acting as an ion exchanger, it contains substances good for plants and for the reproductive health of fishes, and can even prevent algae growth and kill microorganisms. Peat often stains the water yellow or brown due to the leaching of tannins.

=== Sand ===
Sand is often recommended for use with certain species, such as the river stingrays of family Potamotrygonidae, which bury themselves in the fine substrate. However, these species can be successfully kept with coarser substrates as well. Clay can be mixed in with sand to provide extra nutrients for live plants.

=== Leaf (leaves) ===
A growing aquarist substrate is the use of leaves in an aquarium in replacement for traditional substrate. The leaf or leaves can be mixed with other substrates or solely on their own. They mimic the natural environments of aquatic creatures and create a stress free and pH balancing environment for flora and fauna by tinting the water column colour to a reddish hue with the release of beneficial tannin that certain aquatic life prefer. They are often used in blackwater aquarium biotopes. Care has to be taken as some leaf matter may be poisonous in nature and harmful to aquatic life.

In some aquaria, different substrates are used in different parts of the tank. For example, peat can be used in one corner, while gravel in another portion allows rooted plants.

== See also ==
- Substrate (vivarium)
