= Reef aquarium =

Marine aquarium that displays live corals and other marine animals

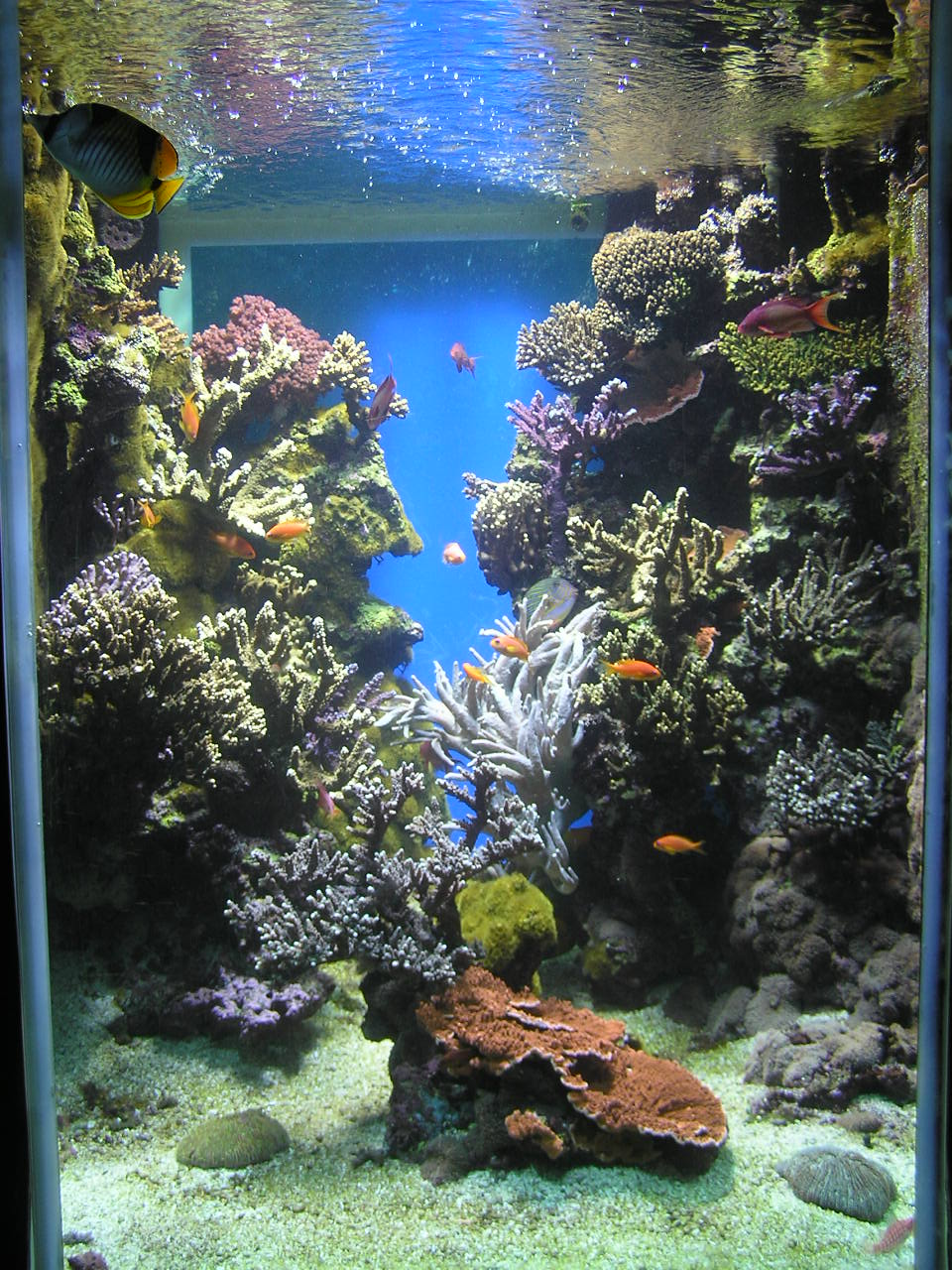
Reef aquarium in Monaco

A reef aquarium or reef tank is a marine aquarium that prominently displays live corals and other marine invertebrates as well as fish that play a role in maintaining the tropical coral reef environment. A reef aquarium requires appropriately intense lighting, turbulent water movement, and more stable water chemistry than fish-only marine aquaria, and careful consideration is given to which reef animals are appropriate and compatible with each other.

== Components ==
Reef aquariums consist of a number of components, in addition to the livestock, including:

- Display tank: The primary tank in which the livestock are kept and shown.
- Stand: A stand allows for placement of the display tank at eye level and provides space for storage of the accessory components.
- Sump: An accessory tank in which mechanical equipment is kept. A remote sump allows for a clutter-free display tank.
- Refugium: An accessory tank dedicated to the cultivation of beneficial macroalgae and microflora/fauna. The refugium and sump are often housed in a single tank with a system of dividers to separate the compartments.
- Lighting: Several lighting options are available for the reef-keeper and are tailored to the types of coral kept.
- Canopy: The canopy houses the light fixtures and provides access to the tank for feeding and maintenance.
- Filtration and water movement: A variety of filtration and water movement strategies are employed in reef aquaria. Bulky equipment is often relegated to the sump.

=== Display tank ===
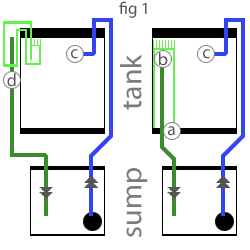
"Hang-on" overflow (left) and internal apparatus (right): 1. water return line; 2. standpipe; 3. return outlet; 4. continuous siphon feed

A "reef ready" or simply "drilled" tank is often used. This style of tank has holes drilled into the rear pane allowing water to drain into the sump or refugium.

These drains are usually housed in an internal overflow apparatus made of plastic or glass which encloses a drain standpipe and a water return line. The surface water pours over the overflow, down the standpipe, through PVC piping, into the sump. After transiting the sump, water is pushed by a return water pump through the second hole and into the aquarium.

Alternatively, standard non-drilled aquariums employ an external "hang-on" overflow that feeds water via continuous siphon to the sump as shown in fig 1.

The tanks are usually constructed from either glass or acrylic. Acrylic has the advantage of optical clarity, lightness, and ease of drilling. Drawbacks include a tendency to scratch easily, bowing, and often limited access from above due to top bracing. Glass aquariums are heavier but harder to scratch. Other materials such as epoxy-coated plywood have been used by industrious DIYers, but these materials are typically reserved for the construction of larger tanks.

=== Filtration ===
The primary biological filtration for reef aquariums usually comes from the use of live rock which come from various tropical zones around existing reefs, or more recently aquacultured rock from Florida. Some reefkeepers also use what is called deep sand beds (DSB). These are often employed to augment the biological filtration by aiding in the reduction of nitrate, a waste product in an incomplete nitrogen cycle. Deep sand bed opponents may prefer a "bare bottom" or "suspended reef" which allows for easier removal of nitrate-generating accumulated detritus. This biological filtration is usually supplemented by protein skimmers. Protein skimmers use the foam fractionation process wherein air is introduced into a water stream creating microbubbles. Organic waste adheres to the surface of these microbubbles and is removed as it overflows at the reactor surface into a removable cup. This group of elements used in conjunction is characteristic of the Berlin Method, named for the city in which it was first devised.

In recent years, the Berlin Method is often supplemented with a refugium. A refugium provides many benefits, which include nitrate reduction, as well as providing a natural food source. It typically houses two main species of macroalgae, including Caulerpa prolifera or chaetomorphae or both (because these two strains are known not to spore but grow by rooting to propagate). Macroalgae is used for two reasons: to remove excess nutrients from the water such as nitrate, phosphate, and iron, and to support beneficial microflora and fauna (zooplankton). Small invertebrates (copepods and amphipods) are provided a space free of predation to grow and, when returned to the display tank, serve as food for corals and fish. Conventional combined mechanical/biological filtration used in fish only systems is avoided because those filters trap detritus and produce nitrates which may stunt or even kill many delicate corals. Chemical filtration in the form of activated carbon is used when needed to remove discoloration of the water, or to remove dissolved matter (organic or otherwise) to help purify the water in the reef system.

=== Water movement ===
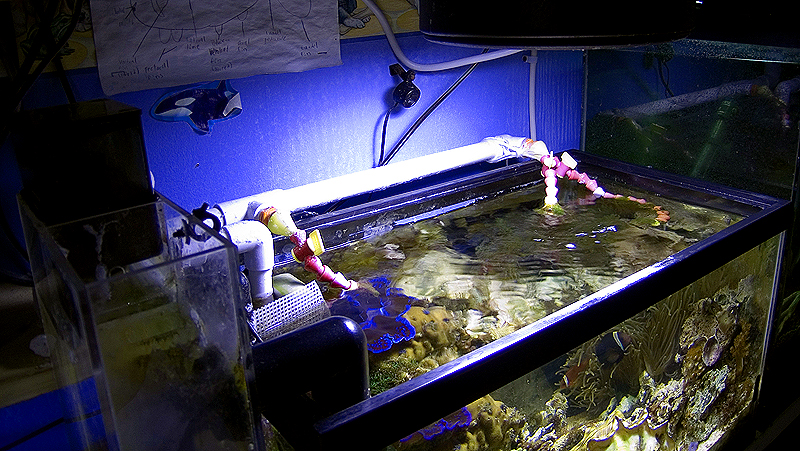
An example of a closed loop water circulation system

Water movement is important in the reef aquarium with different types of coral requiring different flow rates. At present, many hobbyists advocate a water turnover rate of 10x: 10 x aquarium capacity in gallons = required flow in gallons per hour—this is mathematically equivalent to a complete aquarium water turnover every 6 minutes. This is a general rule with many exceptions. Some corals, such as mushroom corals and polyp corals, require very little flow to thrive. Conversely, large-polyp stony corals such as brain coral, bubble coral, elegance coral, cup coral, torch coral, and trumpet coral require moderate amounts of flow, and small polyp stony corals such as Acropora, Montipora, Porites, and Pocillopora require high, turbulent, conditions, which imitates breaking waves in shallow water near the tip of the reef. The directions which water pumps are pointed within an aquarium will have a large effect on flow speeds. Many corals will gradually move themselves to a different area of the tank if the water movement in its current area is not satisfactory.

"Since flow speed is the critical measure for determining the rate of gas exchange, turnover does little to convey how fast a coral will respire and photosynthesize."

Reef ready tanks obtain at least a portion of the required water motion from the pump that returns water from the sump. This flow usually is augmented by other strategies. A popular strategy is placement within the display tank of multiple powerheads. Powerheads are simply small submersible water pumps that produce a laminar or narrow, unidirectional water stream. If the presence of the powerhead in the tank does not fit with the aesthetics of the display, small holes may be drilled in an overflow of a tank and the bulk of the powerhead can be hidden, leaving only the small funnel spout visible in the tank. The pumps may be alternately switched on and off using a wave timer and aimed at one another or at the aquarium glass to create turbulent flow in the tank. Drawbacks to the use of these powerheads include their capacity to clutter the display tank, propensity for excess heat production, and the laminar quality of water flow often produced. Another method is the closed loop in which water is pulled from the main tank into a pump which returns the water back into the aquarium via one or more returns to create water turbulence. Newer submersible propeller pumps are gaining popularity and are able to generate large volumes of turbulent water flow without the intensely directed laminar force of a power head. Propeller pumps are more energy-efficient than powerheads, but require a higher initial investment.

Another recent method is the gyre tank. A gyre tank encourages a maximum amount of water momentum through a divider in the center of the aquarium. The divider leaves an open, unobstructed space which provides a region with little friction against water movement. Building water momentum using a gyre is an efficient method to increase flow, thus benefiting coral respiration and photosynthesis.

Water flow is important to bring food to corals, since no coral fully relies on photosynthesis for food. Gas exchange occurs as water flows over a coral, bringing oxygen and removing gases and shedding material. Water flow assists in reducing the risk of thermal shock and damage by reducing the coral's surface temperature. The surface temperature of a coral living near the water's surface can be significantly higher than the surrounding water due to infrared radiation.

=== Lighting ===
With the advent of newer and better technologies, increasing intensities and a growing spectrum, there are many options to consider.

Many, if not most aquarium corals contain within their tissue the symbiotic algae called zooxanthellae. It is these zooxanthellae that require light to perform photosynthesis and in turn produce simple sugars that the corals utilize for food. The challenge for the hobbyist is to provide enough light to allow photosynthesis to maintain a thriving population of zooxanthellae in a coral tissue. Though this may seem simple enough but in reality can prove to be a very complex task.

Some corals, such as mushroom corals and polyp corals, require very little light to thrive. Conversely, large-polyp stony corals such as brain coral, bubble coral, elegance coral, cup coral, torch coral, and trumpet coral require moderate amounts of light, and small polyp stony corals such as Acropora, Montipora, Porites, and Pocillopora require high intensity lighting.

Of the various types, most popular aquarium lighting comes from metal halide lamps, very high output or VHO, compact fluorescent and T5 high output lighting systems. Although they were once widely used, many reef tank aquarists have abandoned T12 and T8 fluorescent lamps due to their poor intensity, and mercury vapor due to its production of a limited light spectrum.

Recent advances in lighting technology have also made available a completely new technology for aquarium lighting: light emitting diodes (LEDs). Although LEDs themselves are not new, the technology has only recently been adapted to produce systems with qualities that allow them to be considered viable alternatives to gas- and filament-based aquarium lighting systems. The newness of the technology does cause them to be relatively expensive, but these systems bring several advantages over traditional lighting. Although their initial cost is much higher, they tend to be economical in the long run because they consume less power and have far longer lifespans than other systems. Also, because LED systems are made of hundreds of very small bulbs, a microcomputer can control their output to simulate daybreak and sunset. Some systems also have the ability to simulate moonlight and the phases of the moon, as well as vary the color temperature of the light produced. Moreover, some manufacturers produce LED lighting systems in single bright and double bright intensities for sustaining coral life in marine aquariums.

The choices for aquarium lighting are made complicated by variables such as color temperature (measured in kelvins), color rendering index (CRI), photosynthetically active radiation (PAR) and lumens. Power output available to the hobbyist can range from a meager 9 W fluorescent lamp to a blinding 1000 W metal halide lamp. Lighting systems also vary in the light output produced by each bulb type—listed in order of weakest to strongest, they would be: T8/12 or normal output lamps, compact fluorescent and T5 high output, VHO, and metal halide lamps. To further complicate matters, there are several types of ballasts available: electric ballast, magnetic ballast, and pulse start ballast.

=== Heating and cooling ===
Reef tanks are usually kept at a temperature between 25 and 28 °C (77 and 82 °F). Radical temperature shifts should be avoided as these can be particularly harmful to reef invertebrates and fish. Depending on the location of the tank and the conditions therein (i.e. heat/air conditioning), one may install a heater and/or a chiller for the tank. Heaters are relatively inexpensive and readily available at any local fish store. Aquarists frequently use the sump to hide unsightly equipment such as heaters. Chillers, on the other hand, are expensive and are more difficult to locate. For many aquarists, installing surface fans and running home air conditioning suffice in place of a chiller. Fans cool the tank via evaporative cooling and require more frequent top-off of the aquarium water.

=== Water chemistry ===
Stony corals, which are defined by their calcareous calcium carbonate skeletons (CaCO_{3}), are the focus of many advanced reef keepers. These corals require additional attention to water chemistry, especially maintenance of stable and optimal calcium, carbonate, and pH levels. These parameters may be tracked and adjusted with test kits and frequent manual dosing of calcium and pH buffer additives requiring no additional equipment. Alternatively, automated methods employing small dedicated computers with electronic water quality monitoring capabilities are often used to control water chemistry parameters via several components including calcium reactors and kalkwasser reactors. Calcium reactors are canisters filled with crushed coral skeletons. Carbon dioxide is injected into the canister acidifying the water and dissolving the coral skeletons. The acidified and CaCO_{3} rich solution is then pumped into the sump. The excess CO_{2} then diffuses out of the water and into the air leaving behind the CaCO_{3}. Kalkwasser is an aqueous solution of calcium hydroxide, Ca(OH)_{2}. The kalk reactor stirs and dispenses the solution into the sump where the Ca(OH)_{2} combines with dissolved CO_{2} to produce CaCO_{3}. These components must be controlled by a computer to prevent dangerous changes in pH due to the acidic calcium reactor effluent or alkaline kalkwasser effluent.

Optimal water parameters are:

- Salinity: 1.022–1.025 sg or 30–34 parts per thousand (ppt)
- Temperature: 24–27 °C (76–80 °F)
- Ammonia (NH_{3}): 0 parts per million (ppm)
- Nitrite (NO^{−}_{2}): 0 ppm
- Nitrate (NO^{−}_{3}): 0–10 ppm
- Phosphate (PO^{3−}_{4}): 0–0.06 ppm
- pH: 8.2–8.6
- Calcium (Ca^{2+}): 400–450 ppm
- Alkalinity: 7–12 dKH

Trace elements can become depleted by marine livestock and filtration, but can be replenished during a water change.

=== Safety ===
Large volumes of electrically conductive salt water, complex plumbing, and numerous electrical appliances housed in close proximity certainly pose a significant risk of damage to both person and property and require close attention to safety. All equipment should be used according to manufacturer instructions. Electrical equipment should be placed above water level whenever possible, and drip loops should always be used. Circuit limits should never be exceeded and all appliances should be plugged into ground fault circuit interrupter (GFCI) outlets. These can be purchased at any hardware store and are relatively easy to install. Plug in GFCI power strips are also readily available. Home monitoring equipment with water sensors can also be adapted for the home aquarist and used to alert the owner of power outages or water overflows. This equipment can allow for timely intervention in a potential disaster and provides an added sense of security for frequent travelers.

== Nano reefs ==
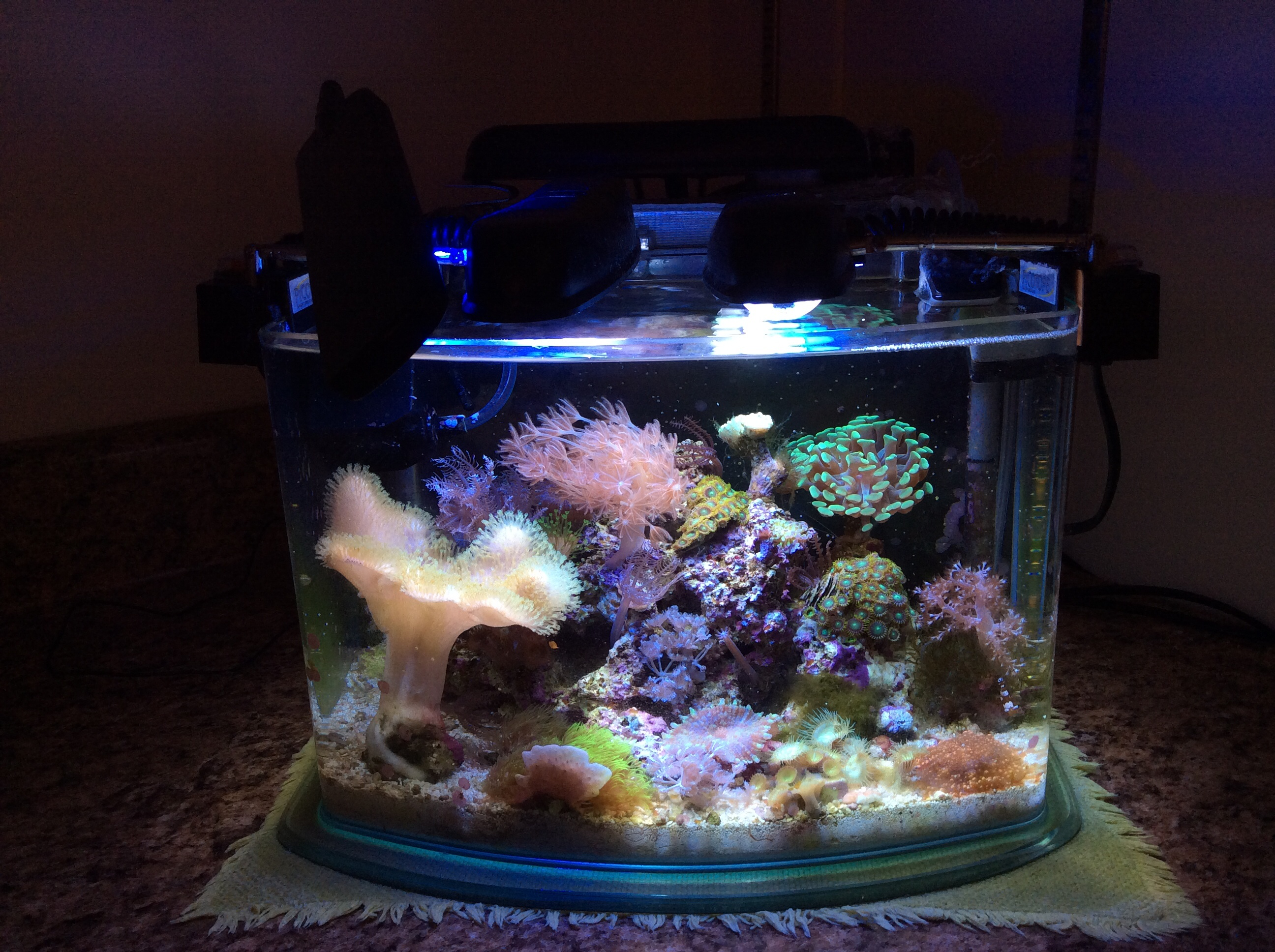
A 14-litre (3-gallon) nano reef containing small and large polyped stony corals, as well as various soft corals

A nano reef is a type of marine aquarium that is typically less than 140 litres (30 Imperial gallons / 37 US gallons). The exact limit that distinguishes a nano reef from a regular reef is somewhat ill-defined. Some claim that anything less than 180 litres (40 Imperial gallons / 48 US gallons) would qualify. But 140 litres (30 Imperial gallons / 37 US gallons) seems to be the generally accepted limit. Nano reefs have become quite popular in recent years among fish keeping hobbyists, primarily because of their smaller size, maintainability, and the possibility of lower costs. The burgeoning interest in this niche of marine aquarium science has fostered several notable contributions ranging from specific consumer products such as specialized aquarium filters, compact high intensity lighting systems and smaller circulation pumps. Such equipment allows the aquarist to maintain an environment wherein many marine organisms are capable of thriving.

An early reference to these small reef aquariums was made in 1989 by Albert J. Thiel in his book Small Reef Aquarium Basics.

Nano reefs are very commonly sold as complete kits which contain the tank, stand, power compact T5, T8, PL lamps or metal halide lighting, protein skimmer, UV steriliser, 3 or more stage filtration, a heater and a water pump or powerhead. However, many nano reefkeepers decide to upgrade their aquariums with better quality equipment such as a more powerful protein skimmer or lighting.

=== Pico reefs ===
Another term gaining popularity is pico reef, which is used to refer to the smallest of nano reef aquariums. Most online forum polls set the range of approximately 10 litres (2.5 gallons) and below as pico reefs. These tiny tanks require even more diligence with regard to water changes and attention to water chemistry because the small water volume provides little room for error. Care must be exercised when stocking these tiny tanks because too many inhabitants can easily overload the tank's ability to process wastes effectively. For the smallest of pico reefs, even the presence of a single fish is discouraged. Pico reefs often consist of live rock, hardy corals, and small invertebrates such as hermit crabs and marine snails. The keeping of pico reef aquariums has tested the extent of allelopathy, the chemical and physical means by which corals compete for space. Before the advent of these concentrated environments, it was thought to be impossible for corals of even a few mixed genera to occupy such a small shared water volume.

=== Challenges associated with small reef aquariums ===
Due to the small water volume, fluctuations of water quality occur more easily, and so nano reef aquariums require extra attention to water quality compared to aquariums of larger water volumes. Many experienced reef aquarists recommend testing the water twice weekly, with water changes at least every week. In particular, ammonia, nitrite, nitrate, pH, salinity, alkalinity, calcium and phosphate levels should be monitored closely. When it comes to nano reefs, even minute changes in water conditions such as mild temperature fluctuations can be problematic, whereas the greater water volume of larger aquariums provides a more stable and flexible environment.

Nano reefs also require extra care in the selection of occupants. There are two major factors to be considered: biological load, i.e., the ability of the tank to process the wastes produced by the occupants, and species compatibility. These issues, though present in larger tanks, are magnified in the nano tank. Species considered reef safe and able to coexist in larger tanks may not do well in a nano tank because of their close physical proximity. For this reason, smaller species of fish, such as gobies and clownfish, are popular choices because of their relatively small size and ability to coexist peacefully with other tank inhabitants.

=== Filtration in nano reefs ===
Many nano reef aquarists prefer their displays to be as natural-looking as possible, and therefore choose to use as few mechanical filtration methods as possible. A primary filtration method in nano reefs is live rock and live sand, which are pieces of rock and sand that have broken from the coral reef and are populated with beneficial bacteria and other organisms that aid in breaking down organic wastes produced by larger organisms in the nano reef. Other nano reef aquarists use devices such as protein skimmers to remove excess waste from the aquarium, before it has a chance to be broken down to nitrate. Removing the excess wastes mechanically can reduce the frequency of water changes needed to keep nitrate levels low. Delaying the action of the mechanical filters, such as by means of a day-night timer, can allow invertebrates to filter-feed naturally. A refugium may also be used to export nutrients, when packed with macroalgae such as Chaetomorpha, and live rock. Deep sand bed filters are another filtration method.
Recently there have been several "natural" methods of processing waste in the aquarium and specifically small environments as nano-reefs. The research on the encouragement of the development of different types of sponges and micro-organisms to process the pollutants in the aquarium, a matter that has been gaining popularity in the aquarium community.

== Livestock ==
=== Fish ===
- Angelfish
- Blennies
- Butterflyfishes
- Cardinalfish
- Clownfish
- Damselfishes
- Eels
- Gobies
- Grammas
- Rabbitfish
- Tangs

=== Invertebrates ===
- Torch Coral (Euphyllia Glabrescens)
- Candycane coral (Caulastrea furcata)
- Frogspawn coral (Euphyllia divisa)
- Hammer coral (Euphyllia ancora)
- Pulse coral (Heteroxenia sp.)
- Brain coral
- Button polyp (Zoanthus sp.)
- Star polyp (Briareum violaceum)
- Sun coral (Tubastraea sp.)
- Bubble-tip Anemone (Entacmaea quadricolor)
- Cleaner shrimp
- Turbo snail
- Linckia sea stars

== See also ==
- Corals of the World (website)
