= Powerhead =

Powerhead may refer to:

- Powerhead (firearm), a direct-contact, underwater firearm
- Powerhead (aquarium), a submersible aquarium pump
- Powerhead (rocket engine), the preburners and turbopumps of a pump-fed rocket engine (excludes the engine combustion chamber and nozzle)
- Powerhead (pump), the mechanical drive of any one of several non-aquarium pump types; marine propeller powerhead, fountain powerhead, etc.
