= Detritus =

Dead particulate organic material

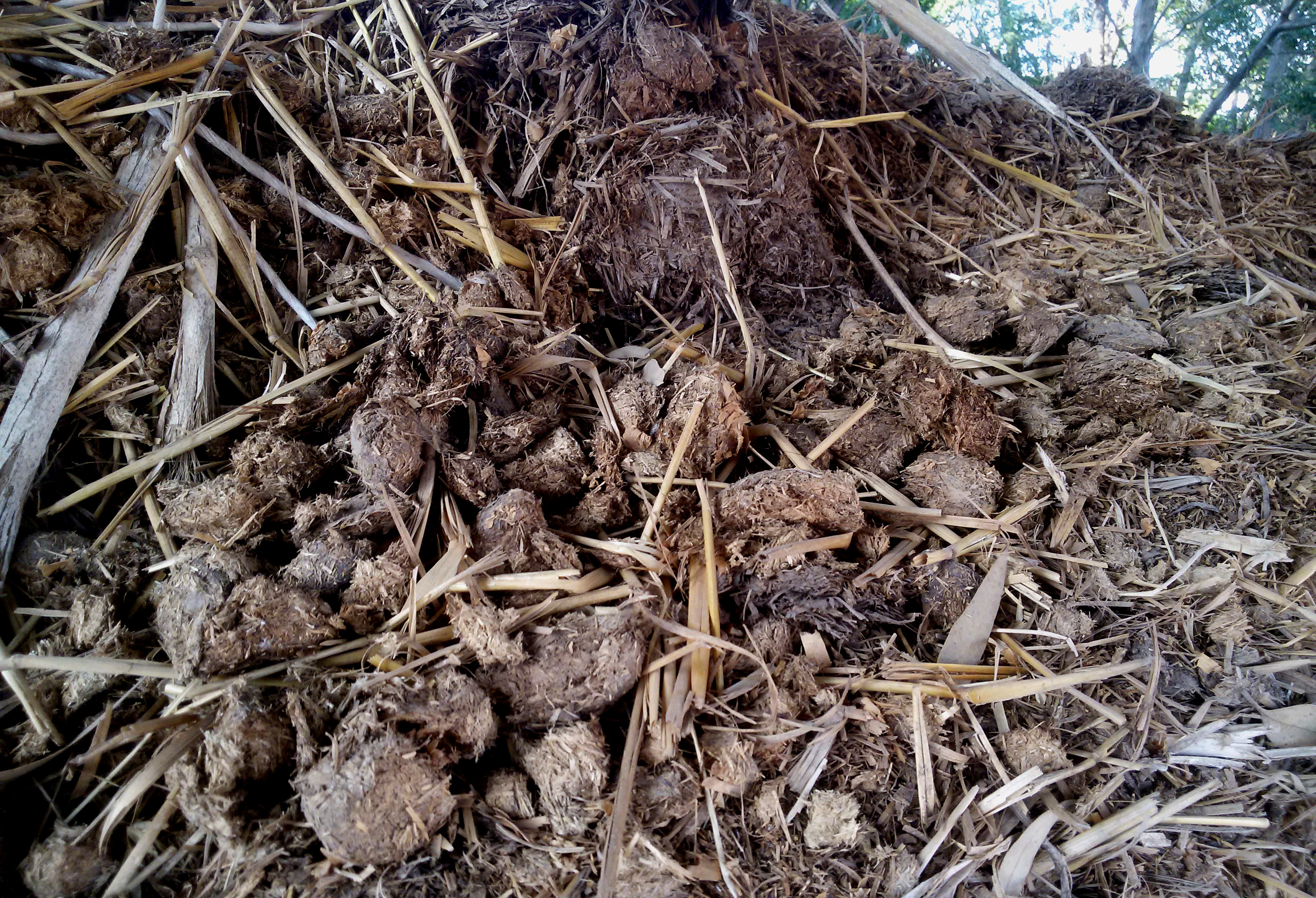
Horse feces and straw are forms of detritus, and are used as manure.

In biology, detritus (/dəˈtraɪtəs/ or /ˈdɛtrɪtəs/) is organic matter made up of the decomposing remains of organisms and plant material, and also of feces. Detritus usually hosts communities of microorganisms that colonize and decompose (remineralise) it. Such microorganisms may be decomposers, detritivores, or coprophages.

In terrestrial ecosystems detritus is present as plant litter and other organic matter that is intermixed with soil, known as soil organic matter. The detritus of freshwater ecosystems are mostly leaf litter and other decaying organic materials. These are decomposed by microbes, and small invertebrates that shred leaves or filter feed suspended organic matter. The detritus of marine ecosystems are organic substances suspended in the water and accumulated in depositions on the floor of the body of water; when this floor is a seabed, such a deposition is called marine snow.

== Theory ==
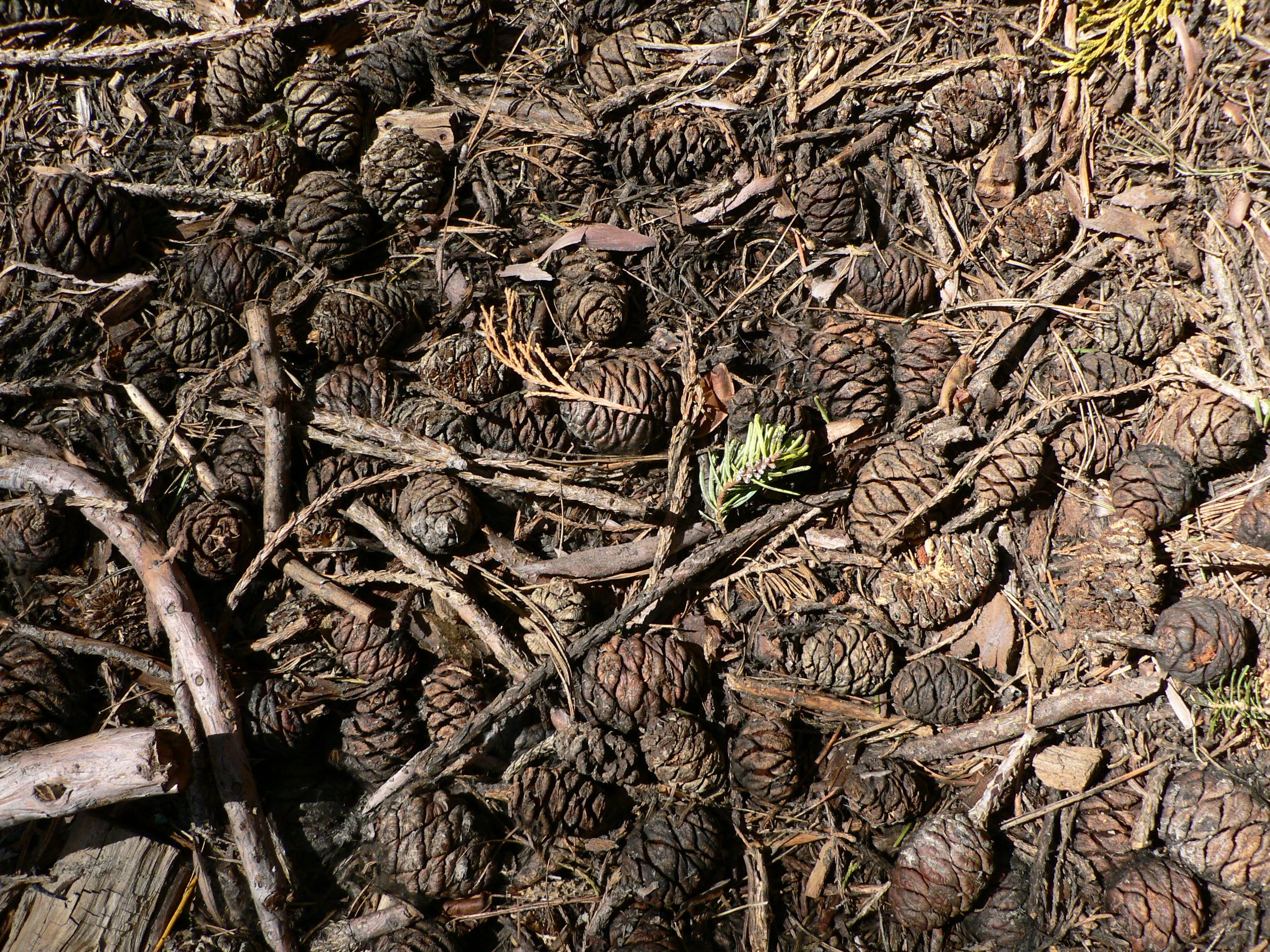
Sequoiadendron giganteum (giant sequoia) cones and foliage, sugar pine and white fir foliage, and other plant litter constitute the duff layer that covers the ground of Mariposa Grove in Yosemite National Park, United States.

The remains of decaying plants or animals, or their tissue parts, and feces gradually lose their form due to physical processes and the action of decomposers, including grazers, bacteria, and fungi. Decomposition, the process by which organic matter is decomposed, occurs in several phases. Micro- and macro-organisms that feed on it rapidly consume and absorb materials such as proteins, lipids, and sugars that are low in molecular weight, while other compounds such as complex carbohydrates are decomposed more slowly. The decomposing microorganisms degrade the organic materials so as to gain the resources they require for their survival and reproduction. Accordingly, simultaneous to microorganisms' decomposition of the materials of dead plants and animals is their assimilation of decomposed compounds to construct more of their biomass (i.e., to grow their own bodies). When microorganisms die, fine organic particles are produced. If small animals (that normally feed on microorganisms) eat these particles, the particles collect inside the intestines of the consumers, and change shape into large pellets of dung. As a result of this process, most of the materials of dead organisms disappear and are not visible and recognizable in any form, but are present in the form of a combination of fine organic particles and the organisms that used them as nutrients. This combination is detritus.

In ecosystems on land, detritus is deposited on the surface of the ground, taking forms such as the humic soil beneath a layer of fallen leaves. In aquatic ecosystems, most detritus is suspended in water, and gradually settles. In particular, many different types of material are collected together by currents, and much material settles in slowly flowing areas.

A large amount of detritus is used as a source of nutrition for animals. In particular, many bottom feeding animals (benthos) living in mud flats feed in this way. In particular, since excreta are materials which other animals do not need, whatever energy value they might have, they are often unbalanced as a source of nutrients, and are not suitable as a source of nutrition on their own. However, there are many microorganisms which multiply in natural environments. These microorganisms do not simply absorb nutrients from these particles, but also shape their own bodies so that they can take the resources they lack from the area around them, and this allows them to make use of excreta as a source of nutrients. In practical terms, the most important constituents of detritus are complex carbohydrates, which are persistent (difficult to break down), and the microorganisms which multiply using these absorb carbon from the detritus, and materials such as nitrogen and phosphorus from the water in their environment to synthesise the components of their own cells.

A characteristic type of food chain called the detritus cycle takes place involving detritus feeders (detritivores), detritus and the microorganisms that multiply on it. For example, mud flats are inhabited by many univalves which are detritus feeders. When these detritus feeders take in detritus with microorganisms multiplying on it, they mainly break down and absorb the microorganisms, which are rich in proteins, and excrete the detritus, which is mostly complex carbohydrates, having hardly broken it down at all. At first, this dung is a poor source of nutrition, and so univalves pay no attention to it, but after several days, microorganisms begin to multiply on it again, its nutritional balance improves, and so they eat it again. Through this process of eating the detritus many times over and harvesting the microorganisms from it, the detritus thins out, becomes fractured and becomes easier for the microorganisms to use, and so the complex carbohydrates are also steadily broken down and disappear over time.

What is left behind by the detritivores is then further broken down and recycled by decomposers, such as bacteria and fungi.

This detritus cycle plays a large part in the so-called purification process, whereby organic materials carried in by rivers is broken down and disappears, and an extremely important part in the breeding and growth of marine resources. In ecosystems on land, far more essential material is broken down as dead material passing through the detritus chain than is broken down by being eaten by animals in a living state. In both land and aquatic ecosystems, the role played by detritus is too large to ignore.

== Aquatic ecosystems ==
In aquatic ecosystems, especially freshwater systems, most of the detritus comes from nearby terrestrial ecosystems. Plant litter is the most important source of carbon in smaller order streams.

In contrast to land ecosystems, dead materials and excreta in aquatic ecosystems are typically transported by water flow; finer particles tend to be transported farther, or suspended longer (termed fine particulate organic matter, or FPOM). In freshwater bodies organic material from plants can form a silt known as mulm or humus on the bottom. This material, sometimes called undissolved organic carbon breaks down into dissolved organic carbon and can bond to heavy metal ions via chelation. It can also break down into colored dissolved organic matter such as tannin, a specific form of tannic acid. In saltwater bodies, organic material breaks down and forms a marine snow. This example of detritus commonly consists of organic materials such as dead phytoplankton and zooplankton, the outer walls of diatoms and coccolithophores, dead skin and scales of fish, and fecal pellets. This material will slowly sink to the seafloor, where it makes up the majority of sediment in some areas. Once settled, the material will not only contribute to sediments but will help to feed different species of detritivores, organisms which feed on detritus, such as annelid worms and sea cucumbers. The exact composition of this detritus varies based on location and time of year, as it is very closely tied to primary production.

== Terrestrial ecosystems ==
Detritus occurs in a variety of terrestrial habitats including forest, chaparral and grassland. In forests, the detritus is typically dominated by leaf, twig, and bacteria litter as measured by biomass dominance. This plant litter provides important cover for seedling protection as well as cover for a variety of arthropods, reptiles and amphibians. Some insect larvae feed on the detritus. Fungi and bacteria continue the decomposition process after grazers have consumed larger elements of the organic materials, and animal trampling has assisted in mechanically breaking down organic matter. At the later stages of decomposition, mesophilic micro-organisms decompose residual detritus, generating heat from exothermic processes; such heat generation is associated with the well known phenomenon of the elevated temperature of composting.

== Consumers and producers ==
There is an extremely large amount of detritus feeders in water. A large quantity of material is carried by water currents. Many sessile organisms survive by filtering organic matter carried by watercurrents, using developed gills or tentacles to filter the water to take in food, a process known as filter feeding. Some organisms catch suspended organic matter with tentacles covered in mucus, like sea anemones.

Certain organisms, like gastropods and brittlestars, scoop up the detritus which has settled on the seabed. Bivalves which often live in sediments, don't just filter water through their tubes, but also extend them to fish for detritus on the upper layers in the sediment on the seafloor.

In aquatic systems, for primary producers, such as plants, algae and phytoplankton, detritus reduces the transparency of the water, and slows photosynthesis.

In terrestrial ecosystems, the waste products of animals, and dead plants and plant material collect mainly on the ground, and as decomposition proceeds, plants are supplied with fertilizer in the form of inorganic salts. In water ecosystems, relatively little waste collects on the water bed, and so the progress of decomposition in water takes a more important role. Investigating the level of inorganic salts in sea ecosystems shows that unless there is an especially large supply, the quantity increases from winter to spring—but is normally extremely low in summer. As such, the quantity of seaweed present reaches a peak in early summer and then decreases. The thinking is that organisms like plants grow quickly in warm periods and thus the quantity of inorganic salts is not enough to keep up with the demand. In other words, during winter, plant-like organisms are inactive and collect fertilizer, but if the temperature rises to some extent they will use this up in a very short period.

It is not entirely true that their productivity falls during the warmest periods. Organisms such as dinoflagellate have mobility, the ability to take in solid food, and the ability to photosynthesise. This type of micro-organism can take in substances such as detritus to grow, without waiting for it to be broken down into fertilizer.

== Aquariums ==
In recent years, the word detritus has also come to be used with aquariums (the word "aquarium" is a general term for any installation for keeping aquatic animals).

When animals such as fish are kept in an aquarium, they produce substances such as excreta, mucus, and dead skin cast off during moulting. These substances naturally generate detritus, which is continually broken down by microorganisms.

Modern sealife aquariums often use the Berlin Method, which employs a piece of equipment called a protein skimmer, which produces air bubbles which the detritus adheres to and forces it outside the tank before it decomposes and also a highly porous type of natural rock called live rock where many benthos and bacteria live (hermatype which has been dead for some time is often used), which causes the detritus-feeding benthos and micro-organisms to undergo a detritus cycle. The Monaco system, where an anaerobic layer is created in the tank, to denitrify the organic compounds in the tank, and also the other nitrogen compounds, so that the decomposition process continues until the stage where water, carbon dioxide, and nitrogen are produced, has also been implemented.

Initially, as the name suggests, filtration systems in water tanks often worked using a physical filter to remove foreign substances in the water. Following this, the standard method for maintaining the water quality was to convert ammonium or nitrates in excreta, which has a high degree of neurotoxicity, but the combination of detritus feeders, detritus and micro-organisms has now brought aquarium technology to a still higher level.

== See also ==
- Biofact (biology)
- Coarse woody debris
- Organic material
- Soil food web
