= Sand bed =

A sand bed may refer to:

- Sand filter, a layer of sand used for filtration
- Dead sand, a term used in aquarism/fishkeeping
- Live sand, a term used in aquarism/fishkeeping
