= Substrate (vivarium) =

The substrate of a vivarium is the material used on the floor of the enclosure. It can affect humidity levels, filtration as well as the well-being of the inhabitants. The appropriate substrate depends on the type of animal in the enclosure.

== Functions and considerations ==
A substrate is used in all types of vivarium and holds an important role in the well-being of the inhabitants. Although having an aesthetic factor, the substrate is an extremely important factor when keeping animals in a vivarium.

Some types of substrate can be used to hold humidity, which is essential when keeping certain types of rainforest dwelling species that require high humidity levels during shedding and food digestion. The substrate may also be used as a drainage system for excess water.

Substrate is also useful for burrowing species as they can dig into the substrate as they would in their natural habitat. It is also useful for egg laying species that would naturally bury their eggs in the earth floor.

The substrate also adds to the aesthetics of the enclosure and gives the vivarium a more natural feel and look.

== Types ==
The type of substrate used depends on the natural habitat of the species kept, for instance a desert dwelling species should be kept on a slate tile substrate, whereas a rainforest dwelling species should be kept on soil or bark chips.

Some keepers may choose to use less aesthetic substrates such as paper towels, newspaper or even tiles and linoleum, especially for newly acquired or quarantined specimens. This is easier for the keeper to keep maintained and there is less risk of the substrate being consumed by the inhabitants.

== See also ==
- Substrate (aquarium)
