= Berlin Method =

Saltwater aquarium filtration method

The Berlin Method of biological filtration is a method for maintaining a clean and stable environment within a saltwater aquarium, typically a coral reef system. This method relies on the use of ample live rock (rock with live marine organisms and bacteria on or in it). The theory is that aerobic bacteria covering the surface of the porous live rock and sand convert harmful ammonia (from fish and invertebrate waste) into nitrites, then nitrates, which are much less harmful to the tank's inhabitants. Through the process of diffusion, the nitrates move deep within the rock where they are converted by anaerobic bacteria to free nitrogen gas. Left over nitrates are removed through regular partial water changes, or with algal filtration such as an algae scrubber. As an added measure, a protein skimmer is used to remove some of the dissolved organic compounds before they break down into ammonia, although skimmers do not remove ammonia from fish urea.

The typical rule of thumb is to use from 1-2 lb (0.45 to 0.9 kg) of live rock per gallon (US) (3.7 liters) of aquarium water depending on the density of the rock – or filling the tank up 2/3 of the way to the top. The benefit of using live rock is fourfold: First, live rock acts as a biological filter, adding beneficial bacteria. Secondly, it introduces an abundance of marine life into the aquarium that many fish, invertebrates and corals use for food. Thirdly, it provides a natural reef appearance with ample places to locate corals. Lastly, live rock will also help balance and stabilize pH in the aquarium.

Calcium, alkalinity and other trace elements which are consumed by corals are replaced through water changes (using natural seawater or a quality synthetic salt mix) or the use of a calcium reactor, kalkwasser (calcium water – calcium hydroxide mixed with pure water) or a balanced two-part solution.
