= Powerhead (pump) =

An aquarium powerhead is a water pump completely submerged into an aquarium to circulate water.

== Description ==
An aquarium powerhead is typically used to create flow throughout the tank. For example, a single powerhead could be used at one end of a freshwater aquarium to simulate a laminar river current, or multiple powerheads can be positioned throughout the aquarium to create more turbulent flow.

A switching or variable-voltage system (also known as a "wavemaker") is commonly used in reef aquaria to more closely simulate the movement of ocean water.

Water circulation is vital to proper biological filtration of most saltwater aquaria (particularly those using the Berlin Method), and is useful in freshwater aquaria for allowing free-swimming fish adequate exercise.
