= Algae scrubber =

Biological water filter

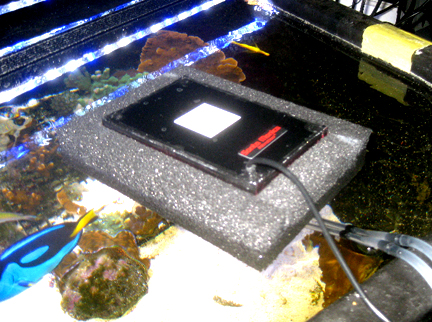
Modern algae scrubber designs use upflowing air bubbles to generate turbulence; when illumination is added, algae grows inside the unit and consumes nutrients.

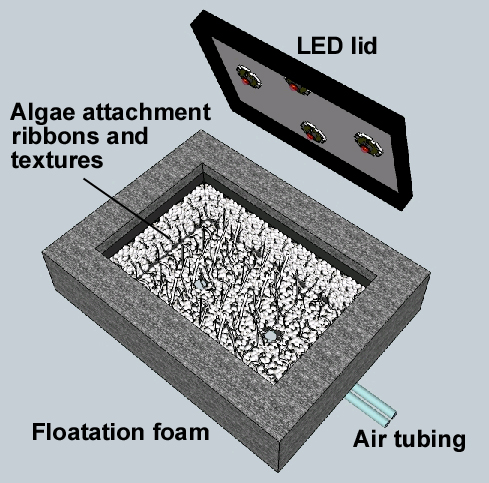
Commercial floating surface algae scrubber uses red LED lights and up-flowing air bubbles to cause algae to grow in the growth compartment. Inside of the compartment is lined with rough textures which enhance algal attachment; ribbons/strings allow further algal attachment.

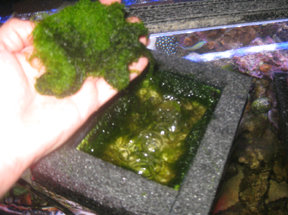
Periodic removal of the algae that has grown inside of an algae scrubber removes excess nutrients (ammonia, nitrate, phosphate) from the aquarium water, thus providing the needed filtration.

An algae scrubber is a water filtering device which uses light to grow algae; in this process, undesirable chemicals are removed from the water. Algae scrubbers allow hobbyists to operate their saltwater or freshwater tanks or ponds using natural filtration based on primary production, much as occurs in oceans and lakes.

== Concepts ==
An algae scrubber filters water by moving water rapidly over a rough, highly illuminated surface, which causes algae to start growing in large amounts. As the algae grow, they consume nutrients such as nitrate, phosphate, nitrite, ammonia, ammonium and even metals such as copper from the water. These nutrients are normally a problem in aquariums and ponds because they cause nuisance algae to grow, and also because they cause sickness and/or other problems in aquarium fish, invertebrates and corals. An algae scrubber allows algae to grow, but the algae grow inside the filter instead of in the aquarium or pond. This removes excess nutrients (scrubs the water), diminishing nuisance algae in the aquarium or pond. Nuisance algae in the aquarium or pond are not to be confused with the desired algae in the algae scrubber filter itself. The algae that grow in the algae scrubber can then be removed, or fed back to the livestock.

Both iron fertilization and ocean nourishment are techniques that boost the primary production of algae in the ocean, which consumes massive amounts of nutrients and CO_{2}. It is this same consumption of nutrients that algae performs in an aquarium or pond.

Algae scrubbers are used in both saltwater and freshwater, and remove nuisance algae of multiple types: cyano or slime, bubble, hair, Chaetomorpha, Caulerpa, and film algae, as well as dinoflagellates and Aiptasia.

== History ==
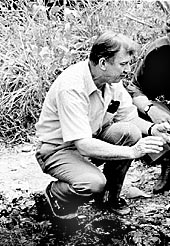
Dr. Walter Adey

The algae scrubber was invented by Dr. Walter Adey, who beginning in the late 1970s, was Director of the Marine Systems Laboratory at the Museum of Natural History, Smithsonian Institution (Washington DC, USA). His research of various types of algae, especially in their ecological role on coral reefs, gave him insight into how the ocean (in particular a reef) "recycles" nutrients. He designed and built various exhibits ranging in size up to 3000 gallons, and modeled different aquatic ecological systems including a tropical coral reef/lagoon which "after 8 years of closure [to the environment], had its chemical parameters controlled solely by an algal turf scrubber. This system, studied by a multidisciplinary team of biologists, demonstrated calcification [coral growth] rates equal to the best 4 percent of wild reefs, and at 543 identified species, and an estimated 800 species, ranked per unit area as the most biodiverse reef ever measured."

In three editions of his book, Dynamic Aquaria, Dr Adey described his work in detail and discussed in scientific principles the physical, chemical, and biological considerations for building a functioning ecological system within an enclosure, from aquarium size, to microcosm (up to 5000 gallons), or mesocosm size (>5000 gallons). In describing the algal turf scrubber he designed, he explained that removing excess nutrients was not its only function. By operating the scrubber at night when the main tank had shifted to a different respiratory phase (plants were now absorbing oxygen rather than producing it) the scrubber maintained oxygen levels and helped buffer pH by preventing high levels of carbon dioxide from building up.

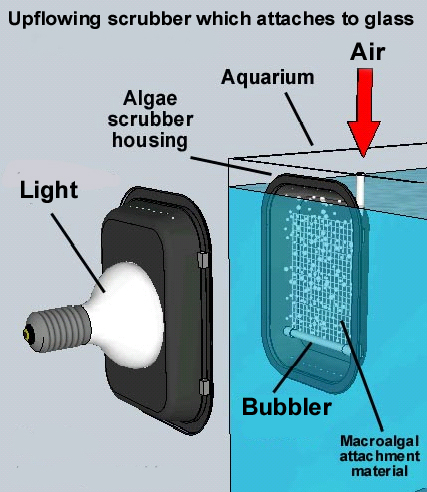
Upflowing scrubber

"Recycling" means how the nutrients go from plants to animals, and back to plants again. On land, you see recycling by following the oxygen flow: Green plants use carbon dioxide and release oxygen; animals use this oxygen and release carbon dioxide. In oceans and lakes, the nutrients go from algae to animals, and back to the algae again.

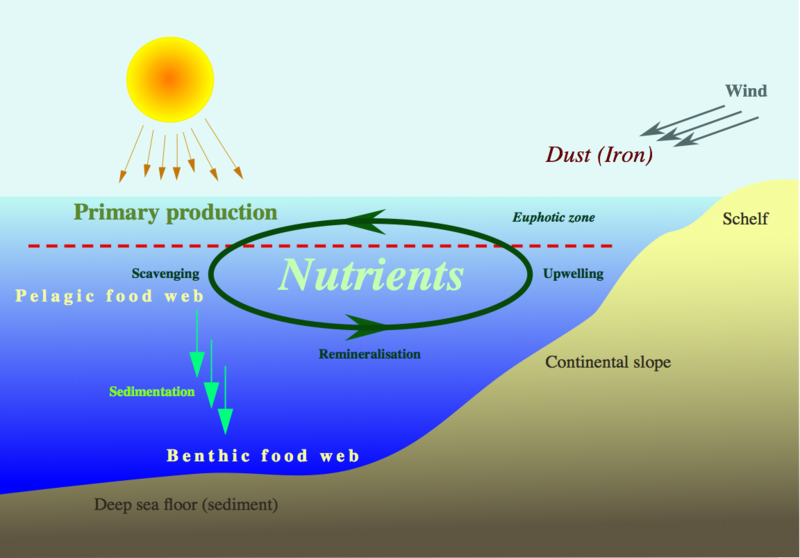
Aquatic nutrient cycle

Dr. Adey built several versions of algae scrubbers for aquariums at the Smithsonian. He called them "Algal Turf Scrubbers", because at the time it was believed that "turf" algae was the best type of algae to grow in a scrubber. He also was granted the first U.S. patent for a dumping-bucket algae scrubber, which described a complex dumping device that poured water onto a horizontal surface, thus simulating waves in a reef environment. After several years of development, he participated in a test of a large algae scrubber on the Great Barrier Reef Aquarium: "The Reef Tank represents the first application of algal scrubber technology to large volume aquarium systems. Aquaria using conventional water purification methods (e.g. bacterial filters) generally have nutrient levels in parts per million, while algal scrubbers have maintained parts per billion concentrations [much lower], despite heavy biological loading in the Reef Tank. The success of the algal scrubbers in maintaining suitable water quality for a coral reef was demonstrated in the observed spawning of scleractinian corals and many other tank inhabitants."

Unfortunately, it was not known at the time (1988) that calcium and alkalinity needed to be added to an enclosed reef tank, in order to replace that which is utilized by the growing calcifying organisms. Even five years after that, the Pittsburgh Zoo was just starting to test a "mesocosm" scrubber reef tank to see if calcium levels would drop: "It was hypothesized that Ca^{2+} and the substitutive elements Sr^{2+} and Mg^{2+} might have reduced concentrations in a coral reef microcosm due to continuous reuse of the same seawater as a consequence of the recycling process inherent in the coral reef mesocosm." [...] "The scleractinians (Montastrea, Madracis, Porites, Diploria, and Acropora) and calcareous alga (Halimeda and others) present in the coral reef mesocosm are the most likely organisms responsible for the significant reduction in concentration of the Ca^{2+} and Sr^{2+} cations." [...] "Ca is not normally a biolimiting element, and strontium is never a biolimiting element; HCO_{3} [alkalinity] can be. It appears that, because of a minor limitation in the design parameters of the mesocosm, these elements and compounds may have become limiting factors. [...] It is surprising that the organisms could deplete the thousands of gallons of seawater (three to six thousand) of these elements even within two or more years." After other researchers added calcium and/or connected their tanks to the ocean (which also supplies calcium and alkalinity), corals began growing again. Nevertheless, "problem" nutrients (ammonia, ammonium, nitrate, nitrite, phosphate, CO_{2}, metals) were always kept at very low levels.

Dr. Adey licensed his patent to very few individuals, who for a short number of years sold a limited number of aquarium scrubbers to hobbyists. The complexity of the design, however, and the cost of the license, caused the scrubber units to be very expensive. This, combined with the fact that the units were noisy, splashy, and unreliable (the dumping mechanism would get stuck) caused the sales to be slow. The scrubbers were just starting to make headway into the aquarium hobby in the 1990s when Adey decided to withdraw his license and no longer allow anybody to make or sell them. He turned his attention instead to commercial and industrial applications, and entered private business making large scale scrubber installations for lakes and rivers.

As the internet developed in the 1990s, aquarium and pond hobbyists began discussing nuisance algae problems, and started noticing a trend: Aquariums and ponds with very high amounts of nuisance algae had no detectable nutrients in the water. This at first seemed odd, since the amount of nuisance algae should increase as the nutrients in the water increased. How could there be a very large amount of nuisance algae, but no measurable nutrients in the water to support this? Biologists then began pointing out that when the amount of nuisance algae became large enough, the algae actually consumed all the available nutrients from the water faster than new nutrients were added, as Dr. Adey had theorized.

Interest in using algae for nutrient control once again increased, this time in the form of keeping the algae in a "sump" or other small aquarium which was connected to the main aquarium via plumbing. With added lighting and flow, algae would grow in this area, and the algae would consume nutrients from the water just as Dr. Adey's algae scrubber units did. Sumps or other small aquariums used for this purpose became known as "refugiums". The name "refugium" was used because the growing algae provided a safe place for small and microscopic animals to breed and grow, and thus was a "refuge" from the large fish and invertebrates in the main aquarium that would otherwise consume them. However while the refugiums did indeed consume nutrients from the water, they did not consume them fast enough in all situations; this caused many hobbyists to continue to have nuisance algae problems in their main aquariums.

== Modern forms ==
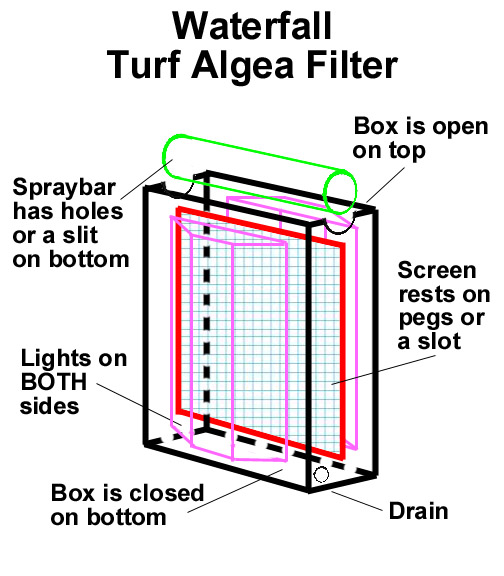
Original vertical scrubber design

More recent variations are built with a simple "waterfall" driven by gravity, using a PVC plumbing pipe to flow water down a piece of plastic knitting screen (also known as "plastic canvas"), which is roughed up to allow algae to attach. In almost every case, these homemade algae scrubbers reduced the nutrients to very low levels, and this reduced or eliminated all nuisance algae problems.

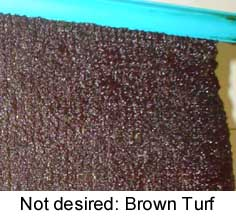
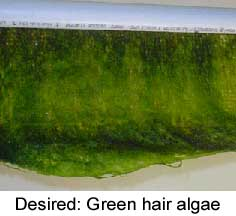
Undesirable brown (left), and desirable green (right) algae

In addition, "turf" algae, which was the focus of Dr. Adey's dumping-bucket design, is replaced by "green hair algae". This is because turf algae tends to be dark brown and thick (like artificial turf on sports fields), and it blocks the light and water from reaching the screen. This slows the growth (and filtering) of the algae because the bottom layers of algae that are attached to the screen start to die and detach. Green algae, however (especially light-green hair algae), allows light and water to penetrate all the way down to the screen if the growth is kept less than 20 mm thick, which allows the algae to grow faster and absorb more nutrients without dying and losing attachment to the screen. This is fortunate because green hair algae is the exact type of algae that grows automatically in a properly constructed algae scrubber.

Some models also use up-flowing air bubbles. This version, which is basically the exact opposite of the waterfall, allows the algae scrubber to be placed underwater in the aquarium, sump or pond, instead of above it. This greatly simplifies construction, since the device does not need to be waterproof, and it allows placement of the scrubber into tight areas where there is no room above the water line. The design also keeps the algae from drying out in the event of a power failure, because all the algae is under water, and the design also removes almost all splashing. The up-flowing bubble design falls into three categories: those that attach to and shine through the aquarium (or sump) glass; those that float on top of the aquarium, sump or pond water surface; and those that go completely underwater like a submarine.

=== Cleaning and harvesting ===
Generally, and except for specific continuous-filtering or continuous-cultivating versions, algae scrubbers require the algae to be removed ("harvested") periodically from the scrubber. This removal of algae has the effect of removing undesired nutrients from the water because the algae used the nutrients in order to grow. The algae is generally removed either:

- Every 7 to 21 days, or
- When it is black, or
- When it fills up the scrubber, or
- When it starts letting go, or
- When nutrients start to rise in the water.

For waterfall versions, the screen is removed from the pipe and cleaned in a sink with running water. The pipe is removed also, and the slot is cleaned with a toothbrush, to remove any algae that have grown up into it. After the algae are removed, the screen and pipe are put back in the scrubber. For upflow versions, the cleaning method depends on the type:

Glass-attached version: The magnet portion outside the glass is removed, and the inside portion is lifted out of the water. If the growth is thick green hair algae, then it is just removed by hand. If the growth is thin green hair (as occurs in freshwater) or dark slime, then the inside unit is taken to the sink and cleaned with a toothbrush. After cleaning, the inside and outside parts are put back into place on the glass.

Floating-surface version: If the growth is thick green hair algae then it is just removed by hand by lifting the LED lid up and pulling the growth out. If the growth is thin green hair or dark slime, then the floating portion is taken to the sink and cleaned with a toothbrush.

Drop-in version: The entire unit is lifted out of the water, and the lid is removed. If the growth is thick green hair algae then it is just removed by hand. If the growth is thin green hair or dark slime, then the whole unit is taken to the sink and cleaned with a toothbrush.

If the screen is not cleaned like this periodically, the algae will get too thick and block light and flow from reaching the "roots" of the algae, and these areas will die and let go, putting nutrients back into the water.

== See also ==
- Refugium (fishkeeping), a component of aquarium systems where algae may be grown
- Protein skimmer, a form of mechanical filtration
- Algaculture, the practice of cultivating algae and seaweed
- Photobioreactor, a device that produces fuel using algae and light
- Wikiversity:Algae scrubber, on how to build a DIY algae scrubber
