= Live sand =

Live sand, a term used in aquarism, is natural reef coral sand populated with large quantities of beneficial bacteria and organisms which aid in the dissolving of organic wastes like ammonia, nitrites and nitrates produced by larger organisms in saltwater aquariums. Live sand can be purchased from aquarium stores, but many hobbyists make their own by seeding dead sand with live sand from other aquarium systems.

== See also ==
- Filter (aquarium)
- Live rock
- Reef aquarium
- Sand
