= Protein skimmer =

Water treatment technology

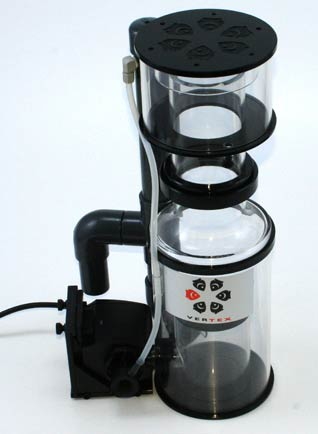
Protein skimmer

A protein skimmer or foam fractionator is a device used to remove organic compounds such as food and waste particles from water. It is most commonly used in commercial applications like municipal water treatment facilities, public aquariums, and aquaculture facilities. Smaller protein skimmers are also used for filtration of home saltwater aquariums and even freshwater aquariums and ponds.

In recirculating aquaculture systems, foam fractionators are widely used to remove dissolved organic matter and fine particulates that biological and mechanical filters cannot capture, reducing total organic carbon loads on downstream biofilters.

== Function ==
Protein skimming removes certain organic compounds, including proteins and amino acids found in food particles and fish waste, by using the polarity of the protein itself. Due to their intrinsic charge, water-borne proteins are either repelled or attracted by the air–water interface and these molecules can be described as hydrophobic (such as fats or oils) or hydrophilic (such as salt, sugar, ammonia, most amino acids, and most inorganic compounds). However, some larger organic molecules can have both hydrophobic and hydrophilic portions. These molecules are called amphipathic or amphiphilic. Commercial protein skimmers work by generating a large air–water interface, specifically by injecting large numbers of bubbles into the water column. In general, the smaller the bubbles, the more effective the protein skimming is because the surface area of small bubbles occupying the same volume is much greater than the same volume of larger bubbles. Large numbers of small bubbles present an enormous air–water interface for hydrophobic organic molecules and amphipathic organic molecules to collect on the bubble surface (the air–water interface). Water movement hastens diffusion of organic molecules, which effectively brings more organic molecules to the air–water interface and lets the organic molecules accumulate on the surface of the air bubbles. This process continues until the interface is saturated, unless the bubble is removed from the water or it bursts, in which case the accumulated molecules are released back into the water column. However, further exposure of a saturated air bubble to organic molecules may continue to result in changes, as compounds that bind more strongly may replace those molecules with a weaker binding that have already accumulated on the interface. Although some aquarists believe that increasing the contact time (or dwell time, as it is sometimes called) is always good, it is incorrect to claim that it is always better to increase the contact time between bubbles and the aquarium water. As the bubbles increase near the top of the protein skimmer water column, they become denser and the water begins to drain and create the foam that will carry the organic molecules to the skimmate collection cup or to a separate skimmate waste collector and the organic molecules, and any inorganic molecules that may have become bound to the organic molecules, will be exported from the water system.

In addition to the proteins removed by skimming, there are a number of other organic and inorganic molecules that are typically removed. These include a variety of fats, fatty acids, carbohydrates, metals such as copper, and trace elements such as iodine. Particulates, phytoplankton, bacteria, and detritus are also removed; this is desired by some aquarists, and is often enhanced by placement of the skimmer before other forms of filtration, lessening the burden on the filtration system as a whole. There is at least one published study that provides a detailed list of the export products removed by the skimmer. Aquarists who keep filter-feeding invertebrates, however, sometimes prefer to keep these particulates in the water to serve as natural food.

Protein skimmers are used to harvest algae and phytoplankton gently enough to maintain viability for culturing or commercial sale as live cultures.

Alternative forms of water filtration have recently come into use, including the algae scrubber, which leaves food particles in the water for corals and small fish to consume, but removes the noxious compounds, including ammonia, nitrite, nitrate, and phosphate that protein skimmers do not remove.

== Design ==
All skimmers have key features in common: water flows through a chamber and is brought into contact with a column of fine bubbles. The bubbles collect proteins and other substances and carry them to the top of the device where the foam, but not the water, collects in a cup. Here the foam condenses to a liquid, which can be easily removed from the system. The material that collects in the cup can range from pale greenish-yellow, watery liquid to a thick black tar.

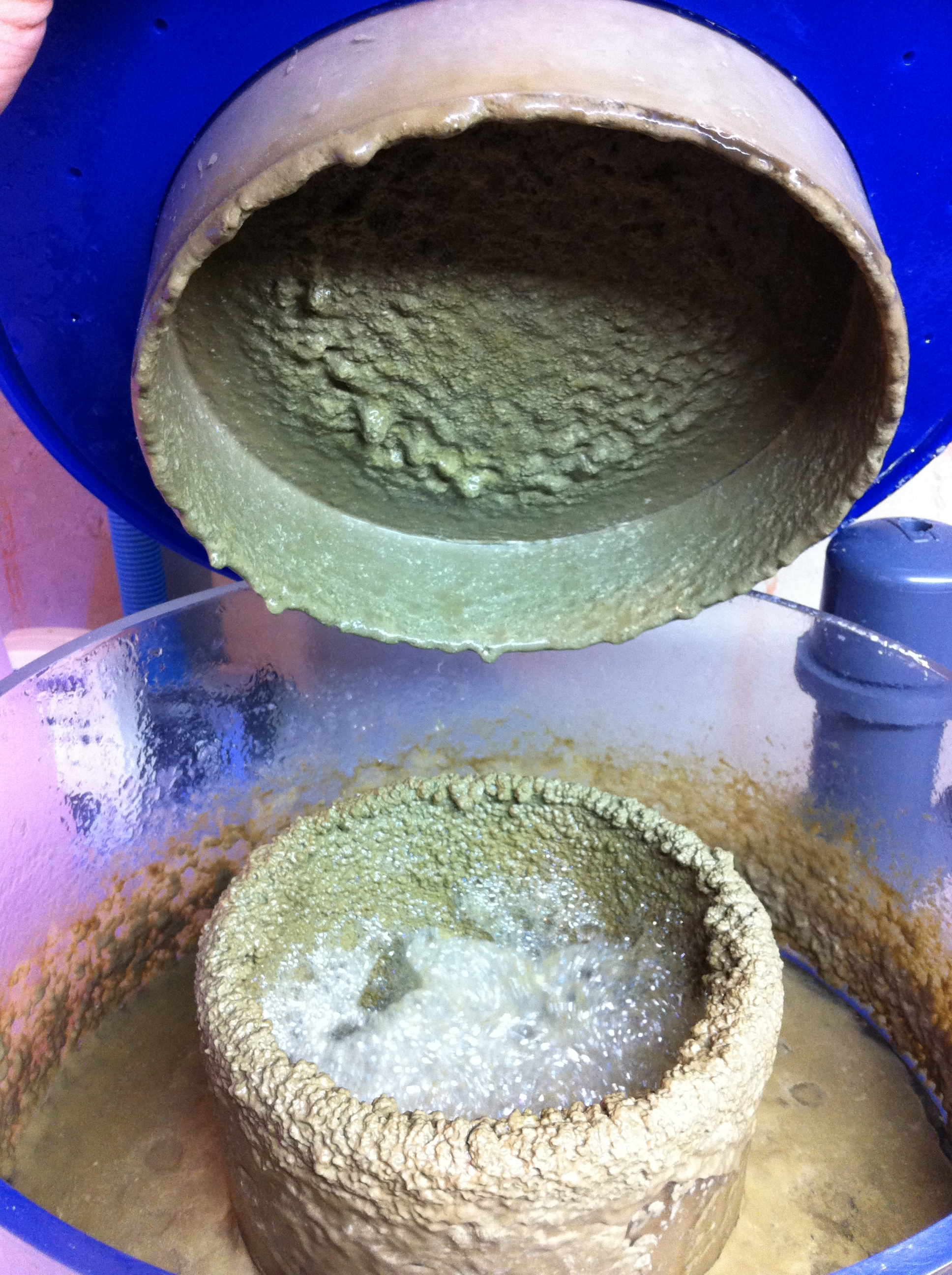
Skimmate collection in MRC skimmer

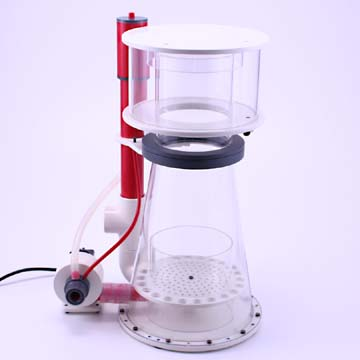
Alpha 170, designed by Klaus Jensen

Consider this summary of optimal protein skimmer design by Randy Holmes-Farley:

For a skimmer to function maximally, the following things must take place:
1. A large amount of air–water interface must be generated.
2. Organic molecules must be allowed to collect at the air–water interface.
3. The bubbles forming this air–water interface must come together to form a foam.
4. The water in the foam must partially drain without the bubbles popping prematurely.
5. The drained foam must be separated from the bulk water and discarded.

Since 2006, considerable attention has been given to the general shape of protein skimmers. In particular, focus centered on the introduction of cone-shaped skimmer bodies. Klaus Jansen of Royal Exclusiv has claimed to be the original designer; however, contemporaneous records from 2006–2007 show only acrylic cones for skimmer bodies, while complete cone skimmers were already being sold by Anton Burian of Aquarium Technik Burian in the EU and later in the USA by 2007. Korallen-Zucht also introduced the Revolution line of cone-bodied skimmers around 2007, though these were generally considered less effective due to reliance on Beckett-style venturi injection rather than needlewheel pumps, and the absence of a bubble plate.

A “bubble plate”—a turbulence-reducing flow distribution plate at the base of the skimmer, similar to an inverted showerhead—was popularized and refined by Klaus Jansen prior to the widespread adoption of cone bodies. Evidence suggests that the cone concept emerged independently among multiple designers, based on the principle that a tapered body allows foam to accumulate more gradually through a smooth geometric transition rather than an abrupt neck reduction.

It is often claimed that a cone body reduces internal turbulence compared to a cylindrical design. More precisely, the taper reduces radial (cross-flow) turbulent eddy formation by progressively constraining lateral velocity components as the cross-sectional area decreases, promoting a more coherent upward (axial) flow. This effect works in conjunction with bubble plates and high-efficiency needlewheel pumps, which achieve high air-to-water ratios (approaching 2:1 water-to-air by volume), shifting the internal flow regime toward a gas-dominated dispersion and reducing large-scale turbulent mixing.

Another often overlooked benefit of cone geometry is that it allows the skimmer to operate with a lower internal waterline while still maintaining a stable foam head. The tapered body promotes a gradual compression of the air-water mixture and reduces radial turbulence, allowing foam to consolidate more efficiently as it rises. In practice, this reduces the required operating water height compared to a cylindrical body, which in turn reduces backpressure on the pump’s air and water intakes. This allows increased air draw with less water flow and turbulence. As a result, some cone-body skimmers can operate effectively in relatively shallow sump depths (e.g., ~4–6 inches).

Critics have argued that the reduced volume and height of a cone body decreases dwell time; however, work by Randy Holmes-Farley and others shifted emphasis away from dwell time as the primary efficiency metric, instead highlighting the importance of air-water interfacial area and bubble density, where modern cone-body needlewheel skimmers excel.

Overall, protein skimmers were once classed in two ways depending on whether they operate by co-current flow or counter-current flow. In a co-current flow system, air is introduced at the bottom of the chamber and is in contact with the water as it rises upwards towards the collection chamber. In a counter-current system, air is forced into the system under pressure and moves against the flow of the water for a while before it rises up towards the collection cup. Because the air bubbles may be in contact with the water for a longer period in a counter-current flow system, protein skimmers of this type are considered by some to be more effective at removing organic wastes.

Since the popularization of Bubble-Plate technology and high-efficiency mixing pumps, 'counter-current' vs. 'co-current' differentiation has lost relevance.

=== Co-current flow systems ===
==== Air stone ====
The original method of protein skimming, running pressurized air through a diffuser to produce large quantities of microbubbles, remains a viable, effective, and economic choice, although newer technologies may require lower maintenance. The air stone is most often an oblong, partially hollowed block of wood, most often of the genus Tilia. The most popular wooden air-stones for skimmers are made from limewood (Tilia europaea or European limewood) although basswood (Tilia americana or American linden), works as well, may be cheaper and is often more readily available. The wooden blocks are drilled, tapped, fitted with an air fitting, and connected by air tubing to one or more air pumps delivering at least 1 cfm. The wooden air stone is placed at the bottom of a tall column of water. The tank water is pumped into the column, allowed to pass by the rising bubbles, and back into the tank. To get enough contact time with the bubble, these units can be many feet in height.

Air stone protein skimmers may be constructed as a DIY project from pvc pipes and fittings at low cost and with varying degrees of complexity .

Air stone protein skimmers require powerful air pumps which are often power hungry, loud, and hot, leading to an increase in the aquarium water temperatures. While this method has been around for many years, due to more efficient technologies emerging, many regard it as inefficient current uses in larger systems or systems with large bio-loads.

==== Venturi ====
The premise behind these skimmers is that a high-pressure pump, combined with a venturi, can be used to introduce the bubbles into the water stream. The tank water is pumped through the venturi, in which fine bubbles are introduced via pressure differential, and then enters the skimmer body. This method was popular due to its compact size and high efficiency for the time, but venturi designs are now outdated and surpassed by more efficient needle-wheel designs.

=== Counter-current flow systems ===
==== Aspirating: pin-wheel/adrian-wheel, needle-wheel, mesh-wheel ====
This basic concept is more correctly known as an aspirating skimmer, since some skimmer designs using an aspirator do not use a pin-wheel/Adrian-wheel or needle-wheel. Pin-wheel/Adrian-wheel describes the look of an impeller that consists of a disk with pins mounted perpendicular (90°) to the disc and parallel to the rotor. Needle-wheel describes the look of an impeller that consists of a series of pins projecting out perpendicular to the rotor from a central axis. Mesh-wheel describes the look of an impeller that consists of a mesh material attached to a plate or central axis on the rotor. The purpose of these modified impellers is to chop or shred the air that is introduced via an air aspirator apparatus or external air pump into very fine bubbles. The mesh-wheel design provides excellent results in the short term because of its ability to create fine bubbles with its thin cutting surfaces, but its propensity for clogging makes it an unreliable design.

The air aspirator differs from the venturi by the positioning of the water pump. With a venturi, the water is pushed through the unit, creating a vacuum to draw in air. With an air aspirator, the water is pulled through the unit, creating a vacuum to draw in air. These terms, however, are often incorrectly interchanged.

This style of protein skimmer has become very popular with public aquariums and is believed to be the most popular type of skimmer used with residential reef aquariums today. It has been particularly successful in smaller aquariums due to its usually compact size, ease of set up and use, and quiet operation. Since the pump is pushing a mixture of air and water, the power required to turn the rotor can be decreased and may result in a lower power requirement for that pump vs. the same pump with a different impeller when it is only pumping water.

==== Downdraft ====
The downdraft skimmer is both a proprietary skimmer design and a style of protein skimmer that injects water under high pressure into tubes that have a foam or bubble generating mechanism and carry the air–water mixture down into the skimmer and into a separate chamber. The proprietary design is protected in the United States with patents and commercial skimmer products in the US are limited to that single company. Their design uses one or more tubes with plastic media such as bio balls inside to mix water under high pressure and air in the body of the skimmer resulting in foam that collects protein waste in a collection cup. This was one of the earlier high performance protein skimmer designs and large models were produced that saw success in large and public aquariums.

==== Beckett skimmer ====
The Beckett skimmer has some similarities to the downdraft skimmer but introduced a foam nozzle to produce the flow of air bubbles. The name Beckett comes from the patented foam nozzle developed and sold by the Beckett Corporation (United States), although similar foam nozzle designs are sold by other companies outside the United States (e.g. Sicce (Italy)). Instead of using the plastic media that is found in downdraft skimmer designs, the Beckett skimmer uses design concepts from previous generations of skimmers, specifically the downdraft skimmer and the venturi skimmer (the Beckett 1408 Foam Nozzle is a modified 4 port venturi) to produce a hybrid that is capable of using powerful pressure rated water pumps and quickly processing large amounts of aquarium water in a short period of time. Commercial Beckett skimmers come in single Beckett, dual Beckett, and quad Beckett designs. Well engineered Beckett skimmers are quiet and reliable. Due to the advances in pump technologies and introduction of DC pumps, the concerns of powerful pumps taking up additional space, introducing additional noise, and using more electricity have all been alleviated. Unlike the Downdraft and Spray Induction skimmers, Beckett skimmer designs are produced by a number of companies in the United States and elsewhere and are not known to be restricted by patents.

==== Spray induction ====
This method is related to the downdraft, but uses a pump to power a spray nozzle, fixed a few inches above the water level. The spray action entraps and shreds the air in the base of the unit, similar to holding your thumb over a garden hose, which then rises to the collection chamber. In the United States, one company has patented the spray induction technology and the commercial product offerings are limited to that single company.

=== Recirculating skimmer designs ===
A recent trend is to change the method by which the skimmer is fed 'dirty' water from the aquarium as a means to recirculate water within the skimmer multiple times before it is returned to the sump or the aquarium. Aspirating pump skimmers are the most popular type of skimmer to use recirculating designs although other types of skimmers, such as Beckett skimmers, are also available in recirculating versions. While there is a popular belief among some aquarist that this recirculation increases the dwell or contact time of the generated air bubbles within the skimmer there is no authoritative evidence that this is true. Each time water is recirculated within the skimmer any air bubbles in that water sample are destroyed and new bubbles are generated by the recirculating pump venturi apparatus so the air-water contact time begins again for these newly created bubbles. In non-recirculating skimmer designs, a skimmer has one inlet supplied by a pump that pulls water in from the aquarium and injects it with air into the skimmer and releasing the foam or air–water mix into the reaction chamber. With a recirculating design, the one inlet is usually driven by a separate feed pump, or in some cases may be gravity fed, to receive the dirty water to process, while the pump providing the foam or air–water mix into the reaction chamber is set up separately in a closed loop on the side of the skimmer. The recirculating pump pulls water out of the skimmer and injects air to generate the foam or air–water mix before returning it to the skimmer reaction chamber—thus 'recirculating' it. The feed pump in a recirculating design typically injects a smaller amount of dirty water than co/counter-current designs. The separate feed pump allows easy control of the rate of water exchange through the skimmer, and for many aquarists, this is one of the important attractions of recirculating skimmer designs. Because the pump configuration of these skimmers is similar to that of aspirating pump skimmers, the power consumption advantages are also similar.
