= Aquarium filter =

Fish tank water filter

Air-driven corner filter

Aquarium filters are critical components of both freshwater and marine aquaria. Aquarium filters remove physical and soluble chemical waste products from aquaria, simplifying maintenance. Furthermore, aquarium filters are necessary to support life as aquaria are relatively small, closed volumes of water compared to the natural environment of most fish.

== Overview ==
Animals, typically fish, kept in fish tanks produce waste from excrement and respiration. Another source of waste is uneaten food or plants and fish which have died. These waste products collect in the tanks and contaminate the water. As the degree of contamination rises, the risk to the health of the aquaria increases and removal of the contamination becomes critical. Filtration is a common method used for maintenance of healthy aquaria.

=== Biological filtration and the nitrogen cycle ===
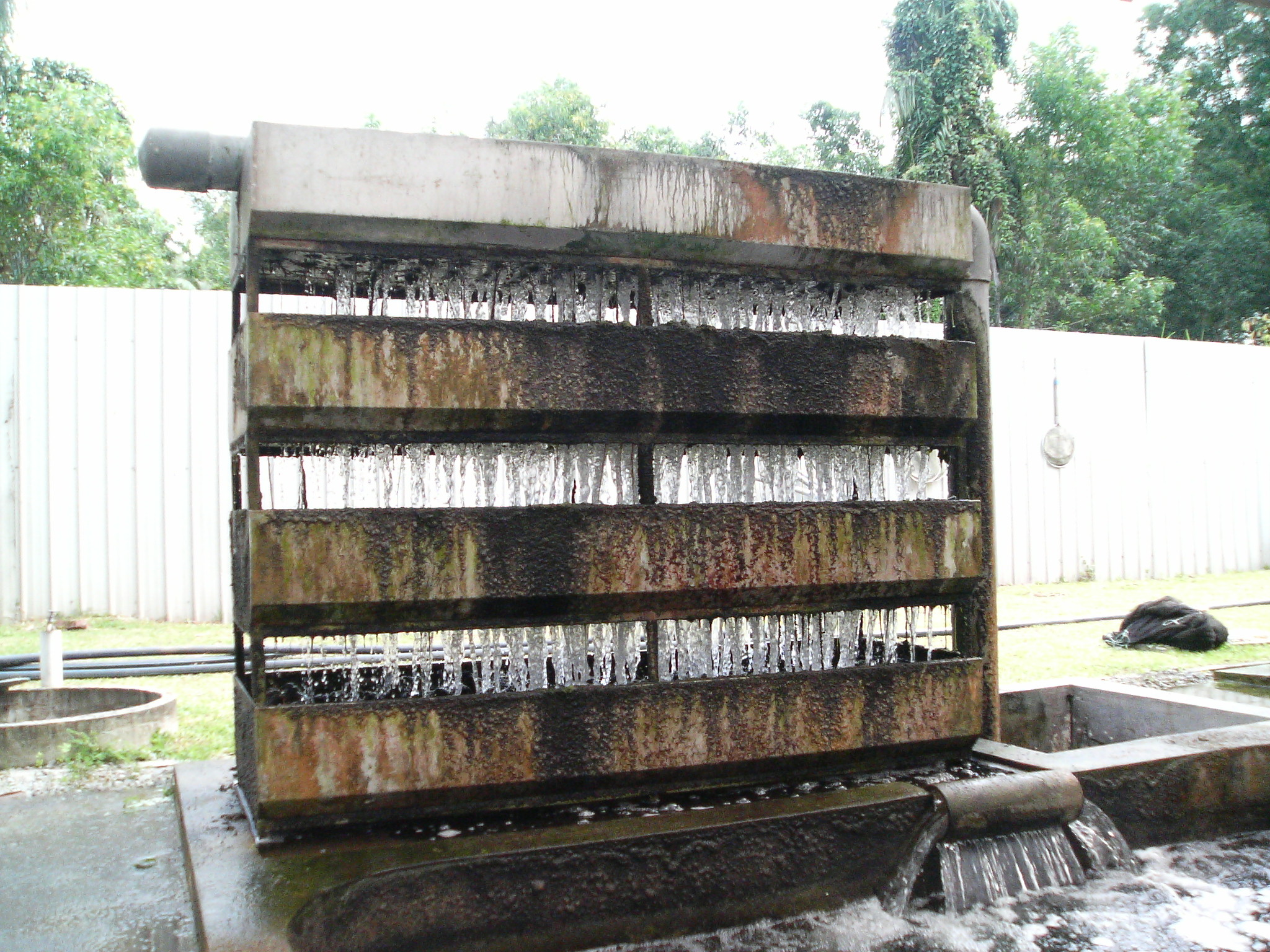
A large shower biological filter designed to maximize the beneficial effects of the nitrogen cycle, in a koi pond

Proper management of the nitrogen cycle is a vital element of a successful aquarium. Excretia and other decomposing organic matter produce ammonia which is highly toxic to fish. Bacterial processes oxidize this ammonia into the slightly less toxic nitrites, and these are in turn oxidized to form the much less toxic nitrates. In the natural environment these nitrates are subsequently taken up by plants as fertilizer and this does indeed happen to some extent in an aquarium planted with real plants.

An aquarium is, however, an imperfect microcosm of the natural world. Aquariums are usually much more densely stocked with fish than the natural environment. This increases the amount of ammonia produced in the relatively small volume of the aquarium. The bacteria responsible for breaking down the ammonia by converting it to nitrite, Nitrosomonas, colonize the surface of any objects inside the aquarium. The bacteria that then convert nitrite to nitrate are Nitrospira and Nitrobacter. In most cases, a biological filter is nothing more than a chemically inert porous sponge, which provides a greatly enlarged surface area on which these bacteria can develop. These bacterial colonies take several weeks to form, during which time the aquarium is vulnerable to a condition commonly known as "new tank syndrome" if stocked with fish too quickly. Some systems incorporate bacteria capable of converting nitrates into nitrogen gas.

Accumulation of toxic ammonia from decomposing wastes is the largest cause of fish mortality in new, poorly maintained, or overloaded aquariums. In the artificial environment of the aquarium, the nitrogen cycle effectively ends with the production of nitrates. In order that the nitrate level does not build up to a harmful level regular partial water changes are required to remove the nitrates and introduce new, uncontaminated water.

=== Mechanical and chemical filtration ===
The process of mechanical filtration removes particulate material from the water column. This particulate matter may include uneaten food, feces or plant or algal debris. Mechanical filtration is typically achieved by passing water through materials which act as a sieve, physically trapping the particulate matter. Removal of solid waste can be as simple as physical hand netting of debris, and/or involve highly complex equipment. All removal of solid wastes involve filtering water through some form of mesh in a process known as mechanical filtration. The solid wastes are first collected, and then must be physically removed from the aquarium system. Mechanical filtration is ultimately ineffective if the solid wastes are not removed from the filter, and are allowed to decay and dissolve in the water.

Dissolved wastes are more difficult to remove from the water. Several techniques, collectively known as chemical filtration, are used for the removal of dissolved wastes, the most popular being the use of activated carbon and foam fractionation. To a certain extent, healthy plants extract dissolved chemical wastes from water when they grow, so plants can serve a role in the containment of dissolved wastes.

A final and less common situation requiring filtration involves the desire to sterilize water-borne pathogens. This sterilization is accomplished by passing aquarium water through filtration devices which expose the water to high intensity ultraviolet light and/or exposing the water to dissolved ozone gas.

== Materials suitable for aquarium filtration ==
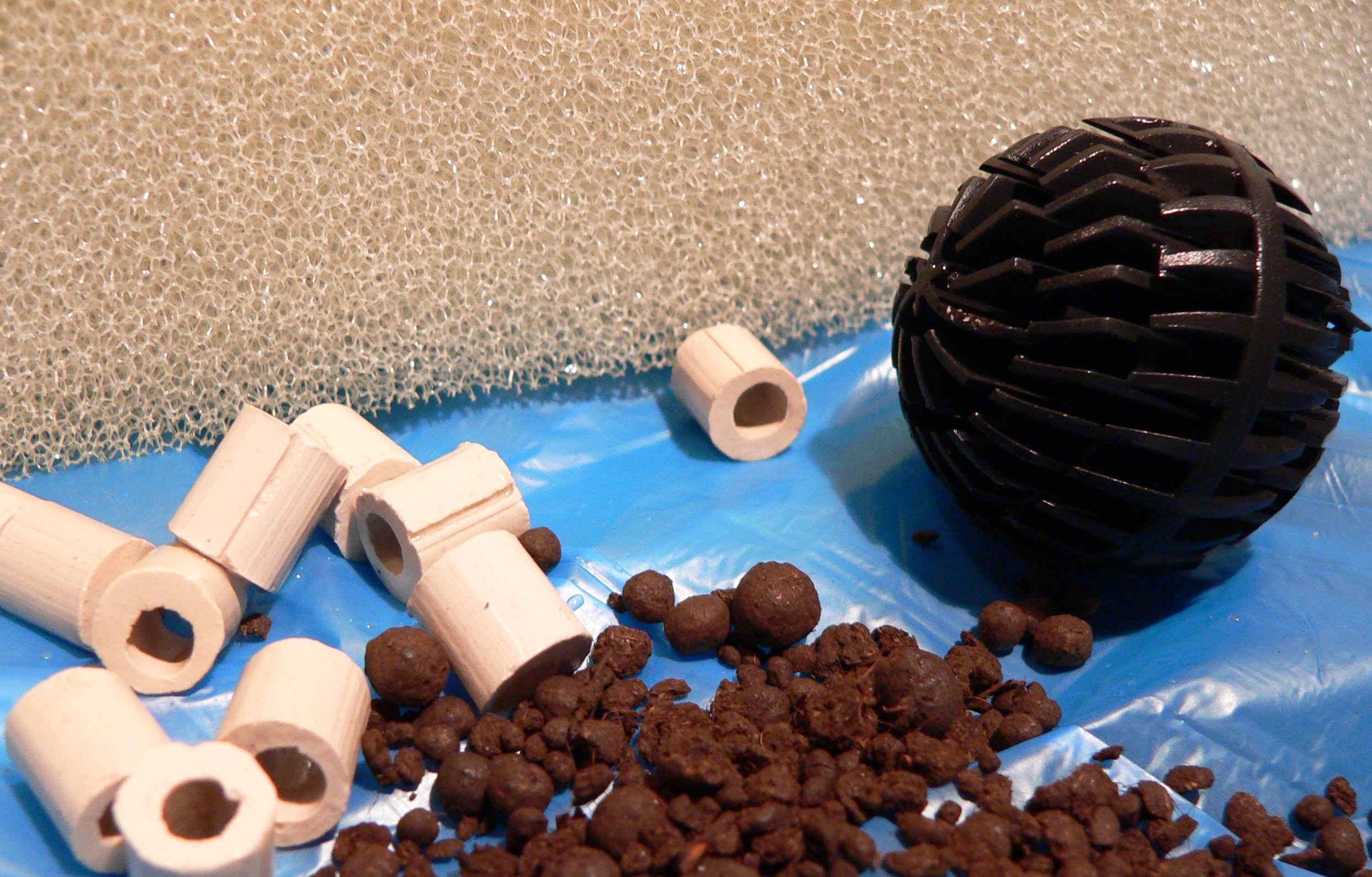
Sponges, plastic balls, ceramic tubes and gravel are all suitable for aquarium filtration

Numerous materials are suitable as aquarium filtration media. These include synthetic wools, known in the aquarium hobby as filter wool, made of polyethylene terephthalate or nylon. Synthetic sponges or foams, various ceramic and sintered glass and silicon products along with igneous gravels are also used as mechanical filter materials. Materials with a greater surface area provide both mechanical and biological filtration. Some filter materials, such as plastic "bioballs", are best used for biological filtration.

With the notable exception of diatom filters, aquarium filters are rarely purely mechanical in action, as bacteria will colonise most filter materials effecting some degree of biological filtration. Activated carbon and zeolites are also frequently added to aquarium filters. These highly porous materials act as adsorbates binding various chemicals to their large external surfaces and also as sites of bacterial colonisation.

The simplest type of aquarium filter consists only of filter wool and activated carbon. The filter wool traps large debris and particles, and the activated carbon adsorbs smaller impurities. These should be changed regularly at suitable intervals. This is particularly important in the case of activated carbon filters, which may re-release their adsorbed contents in large (and therefore harmful) doses if they are allowed to saturate. Activated carbon adsorbs toxins on the extended porous surface of the carbon. It cannot be reactivated by boiling in water. The adsorption of activated carbon can be restored by thermal regeneration at temperatures of 500–900 °C (932–1,652 °F), electrochemical regeneration, ultrasound, or other industrial processes. For the aquarist, replacing the activated carbon with fresh material is simple and inexpensive.

== Types ==
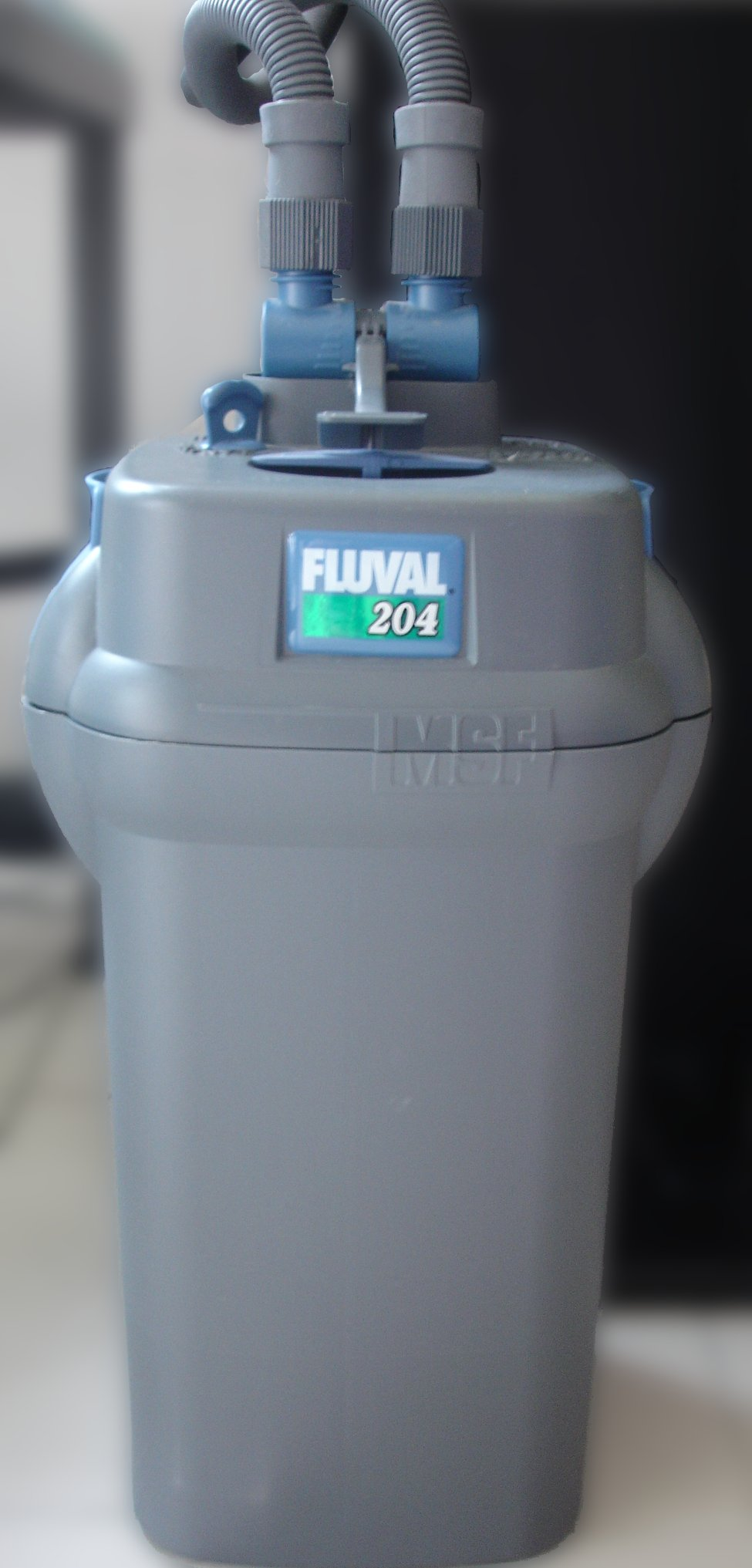
A commercially available canister filter

Numerous types of aquarium filters are commercially available, including:

=== Power filters ===
Power or HOB (hang on back) filters, which are impeller powered, remove water from the aquarium, usually with a long siphoning tube, which is then pushed (or pulled) through a series of different filter media and returned to the aquarium. These are the most common type of aquarium filter. They are often more suitable for larger tanks than other types. However, they are not necessarily the best for smaller tanks, since they have a tendency to cause an excess of water flow in smaller tanks. Other types, such as sponge filters, are ideal in this environment.

Advantages of this type of filter are that they allow for a selection of different types of filter media depending on the tank needs, and that they are easy to clean without disturbing the inhabitants of the tank because they sit on the outside of the fish tank. Disadvantages of power filters include their smaller capacity for filter media compared to canister filters, their aforementioned tendency to create excessive flow rates, and that they tend to be very noisy, usually resulting from vibrations.

==== Canister filters ====
Compared to filters that hang on the back of the aquarium, canister-style external filters offer a greater quantity of filter materials to be used along with a greater degree of flexibility with respect to filter material choice. Water enters the canister filled with the chosen filter material through an intake pipe at the bottom of the canister, passes through the material, and is fed back to the aquarium through the return pipe. Water is forced to circulate through the filter by a pump typically installed at the top of the canister.

Canister filters are sealed, fully flooded systems, meaning that the aquarium, intake pipe, filter interior and the return pipe form a continuous body of water. In this configuration both the intake and return path form two siphons, which precisely counterbalance each other. Under these circumstances, the filter pump does not have to spend any effort to lift the water back to the aquarium, regardless of how high the latter is installed above the canister. The pump should only be powerful enough to push the water through the filtering material as well as overcome the drag in the intake and return pipes. This makes canister filter pumps virtually insensitive to the height difference between the aquarium and the filter (although exceeding the manufacturer-specified height limit can lead to leaks).

Benefits of this type of filter are that they can provide a high volume of filter material without reducing the internal space in the aquarium, and that they can be disconnected from the tank for cleaning/maintenance and replaced without disturbing the aquarium interior or occupants. Also, as a filter with external plumbing, it supports in-line installation of other aquarium equipment, such as water heaters and carbon dioxide diffusers. Such equipment can be removed from the tank and installed in-line into the return pipe of the filter. Disadvantages of canister filters include the increased cost and complexity relative to internal filters and difficulties in cleaning the tubes which transfer water to and from the aquarium. There is also the risk of a leak, which naturally is an issue for any filter placed outside of the aquarium. They, too, fall victim to the issue of excess water flow.

Canister filters were initially designed to filter drinking water, under low pressure. Canister filters for aquariums use high water pressure, from a properly powered pump, to force water through the dense filter media. A pump can draw water from an under-gravel filter, and run it into a canister for double filtration.

==== Diatom filters ====
Diatom filters are used only for sporadic cleaning of tanks, they are not continuously operated on aquariums. These filters utilise diatomaceous earth to create an extremely fine filter down to 1 μm which removes particulate matter from the water column.

==== Trickle filters ====
Trickle filters, also known as wet/dry filters are another water filtration systems for marine and freshwater aquariums. This filter comes in two configurations, one which is placed on top of the aquarium (more rarely seen) and one which is placed below the aquarium (more common).

If the wet/dry filter is placed on top of the aquarium, water is pumped over a number of perforated trays containing filter wool or some other filter material. The water trickles through the trays, keeping the filter wool wet but not completely submerged, allowing aerobic bacteria to grow and aiding biological filtration. The water returns to the aquarium like rain.

Alternatively, the wet/dry filter may be placed below the tank. In this design, water is fed by gravity to the filter below the aquarium. Prefiltered water is delivered to a perforated plate (drip plate). Prefiltering may take place in the aquarium via a foam block or sleeve in the overflow, or weir siphon, or it may be prefiltered by filter wool resting on the perforated plate. The waste laden water from the aquarium spreads over the drip plate, and rains down through a medium. This may be a filter wool/plastic grid rolled into a circular shape (DLS or "Double Layer Spiral") or any number of plastic media commonly known as Bio Balls. As the water cascades over the media, CO_{2} is given off, oxygen is picked up, and bacteria convert the waste from the tank into less harmful materials. From here the water enters the sump. The sump may contain a number of compartments, each with its own filtration material. Often, heaters and thermostats are placed in the sump.

==== Algae filters ====
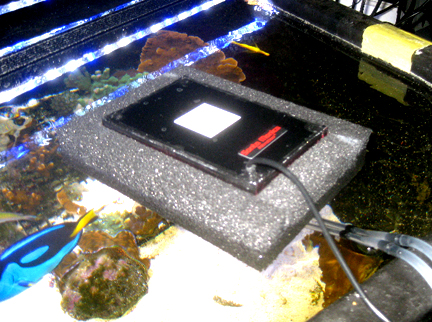
Algae scrubber (upflow version) floating on a reef pond

Algae may be grown purposely, which removes chemicals from the water which need to be removed in order to have healthy fish, invertebrates and corals. This is a natural ("green") filtering method, which lets an aquarium operate the way oceans and lakes operate.

Algae and disease-causing organisms can also be removed by treating the water with ultraviolet irradiation, but the drawback of UV is that it will kill beneficial bacteria as well. Therefore, UV treatment is typically used only when needed, and not all the time.

==== Baffle filters ====
A newly set up baffle filter, under a large volume cichlid aquarium

Baffle filters are similar to wet and dry, trickle filters in that they are generally situated below the aquarium. This type of filter consists of a series of baffles that the water must pass through in order to reach the pump which is returning water to the aquarium. These baffles then act much like a series of canister filters and can be filled with different filter media for different purposes.

==== Fluidized bed filter ====
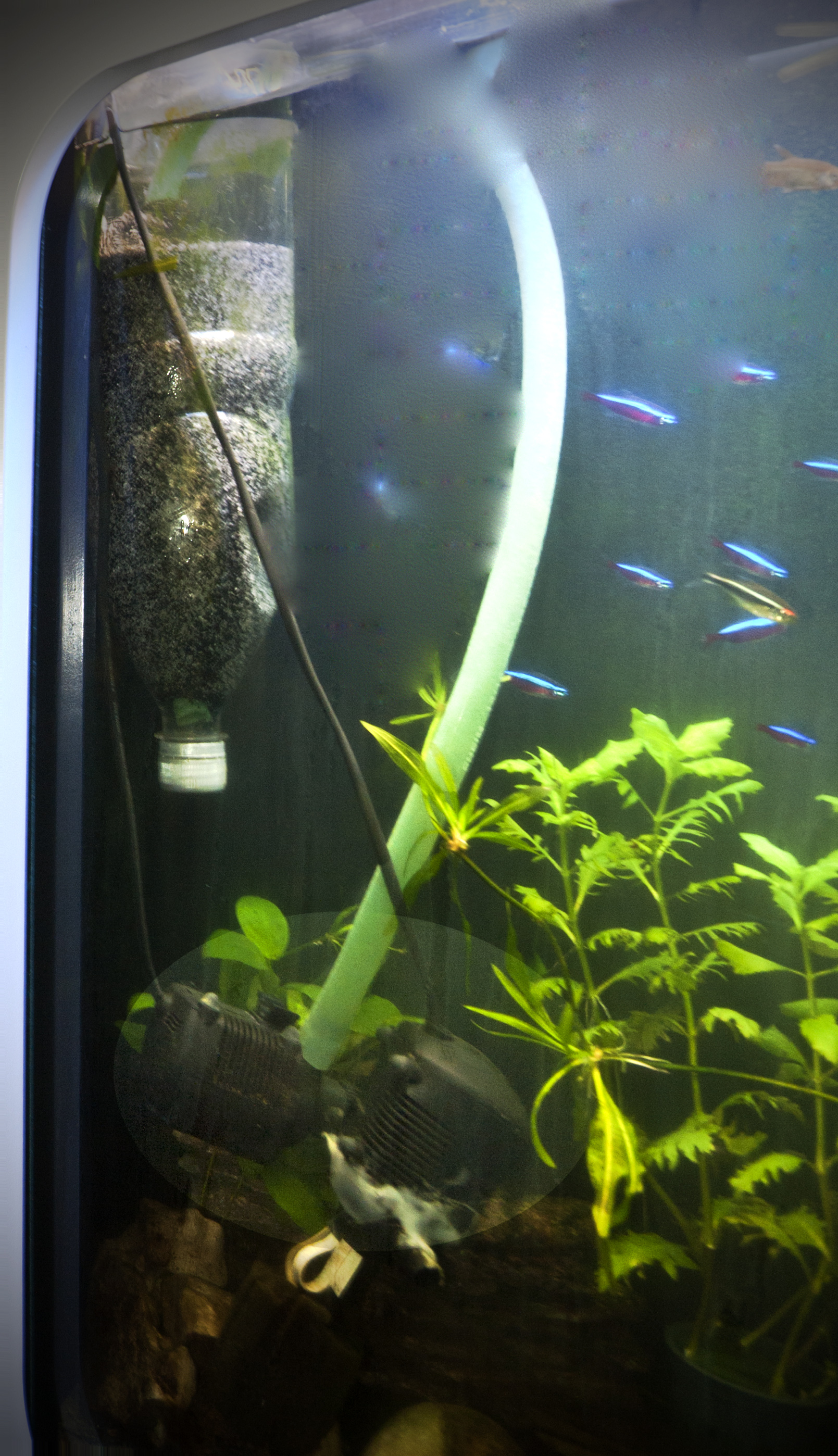
Simple DIY fluidized sand bed filter

The fluidized bed filter (FBF) is a biological reactor only. The principle is to direct water through a sand (or similar media) bed from below so that the sand becomes fluidized – behaves like a fluid. This mechanism is seen in liquefaction, quick sand, and industrial processes including municipal sewage treatment. The combined surface of all sand particles in the filter is very large, and so there is a large surface for aerobic denitrification bacteria. Therefore, the size of the filter can be modest.

The filter itself can be internal or external. In its simplest DIY internal version an FBF is very easy to build, with a container, sand, pump, and some plumbing. There are many variables: shape and size of the container, quantity of sand or equivalent, particle sizes, the pump's power, and plumbing.

=== Internal filters ===
An internal aquarium filter driven by air displacement

Internal filters are, by definition, filters within the confines of the aquarium. These include the sponge filter, variations on the corner filter (pictured top right and left), foam cartridge filter and the undergravel filter. An internal filter may have an electric pump and thus be an internal power filter, often attached to the inside of aquaria via suction cups.

==== Airlift filters ====
Sponge filters and corner filters (sometimes called box filters) work by essentially the same mechanism as an internal filter. Both generally work by airlift, using bubbles from an air pump rising in a tube to create flow. In a sponge filter, the inlet may only be covered by a simple open-cell block of foam. A corner filter is slightly more complex. These filters are often placed in the corner on the bottom of the aquarium. Water enters slits in the box, passes through a layer of medium, then exits through the airlift tube to return to the aquarium. These filters tend to only be suitable for small and lightly stocked aquaria. The sponge filter is especially useful for rearing fry where the sponge prevents the small fish from entering the filter.

==== Undergravel filters ====
A schematic diagram of an undergravel filter run by both an air displacement and water pump (powerhead)

One of the oldest types of filters, the undergravel filters consist of a porous plate which is placed beneath the gravel on the base of the aquarium and one, or more, uplift tubes. Historically, undergravel filters have been driven via air displacement. Air stones are placed at the base of uplift tubes which force water out of the uplift tube creating negative pressure beneath the undergravel filter plate (also called the plenum). Water then percolates down through the gravel which itself is the filtration material. Greater flow rate of water through the gravel can be achieved via the use of water pump rather than air displacement.

Beneficial bacteria colonize the gravel bed and provide biological filtration, using the substrate of the aquarium itself as a biological filter.

Undergravel filters can be detrimental to the health of aquatic plants. Fine substrates such as sand or peat may clog an undergravel filter. Undergravel filters are still effective even if the substrate bed is uneven. In an uneven gravel bed, water will still flow through both portions of the bed, leaving the more heavily covered areas to cultivate Anaerobic bacteria which can neutralise to build up of nitrate.
