= Live rock =

Rock from the ocean introduced into a saltwater aquarium

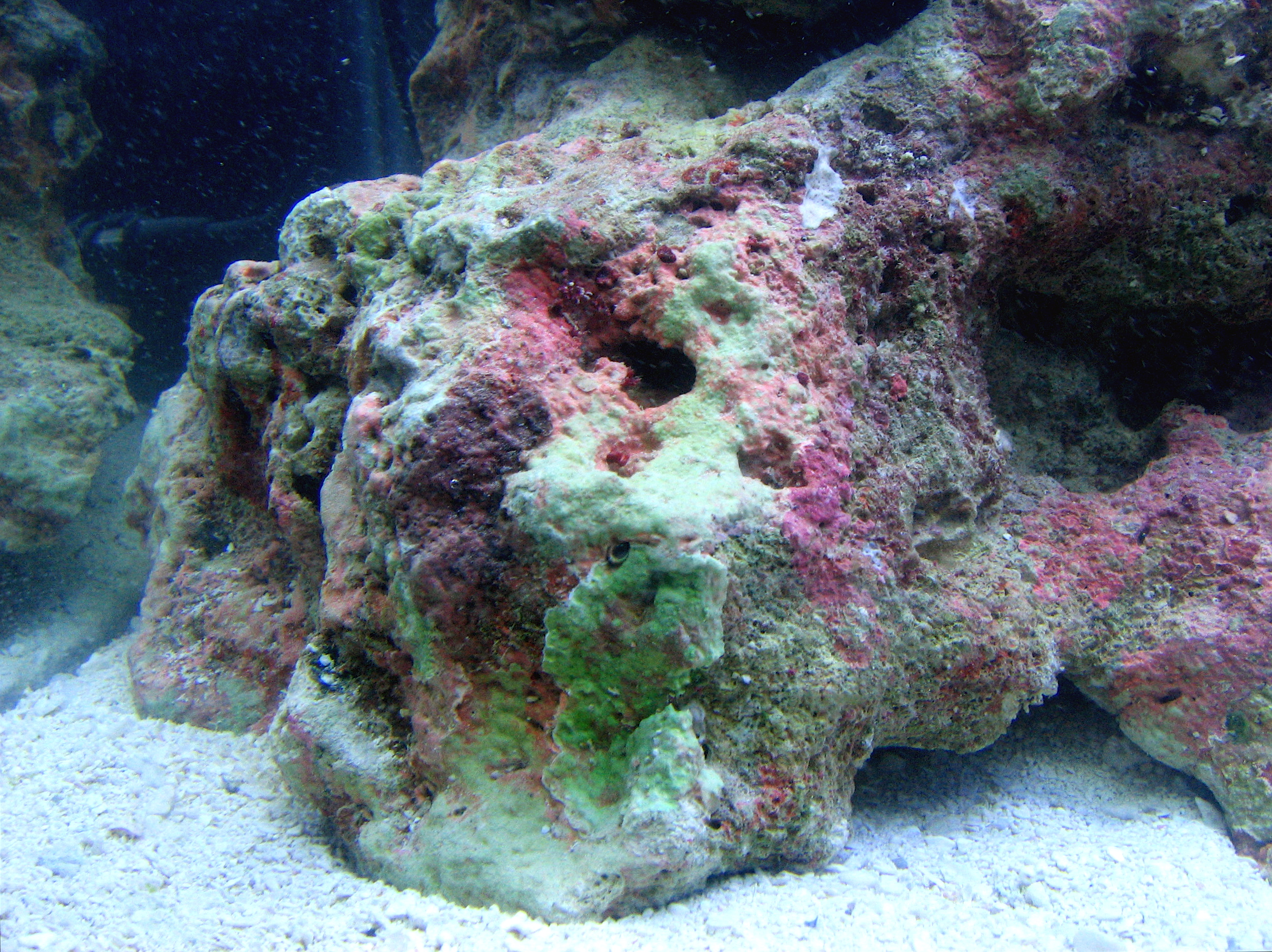
Mature live rock in a marine aquarium, well encrusted with a variety of coralline algae

Live rock is rock from the ocean that has been introduced into a saltwater aquarium. Along with live sand, it confers to the closed marine system multiple benefits desired by the saltwater aquarium hobbyist. The name sometimes leads to misunderstandings, as the "live rock" itself is not actually alive, but rather is simply made from the aragonite skeletons of long dead corals, or other calcareous organisms, which in the ocean form the majority of coral reefs. When taken from the ocean it is usually encrusted with coralline algae and inhabited by a multitude of marine organisms. The many forms of micro and macroscopic marine life that live on and inside of the rock, which acts as an ideal habitat, give it the name "live rock".

== Origin ==
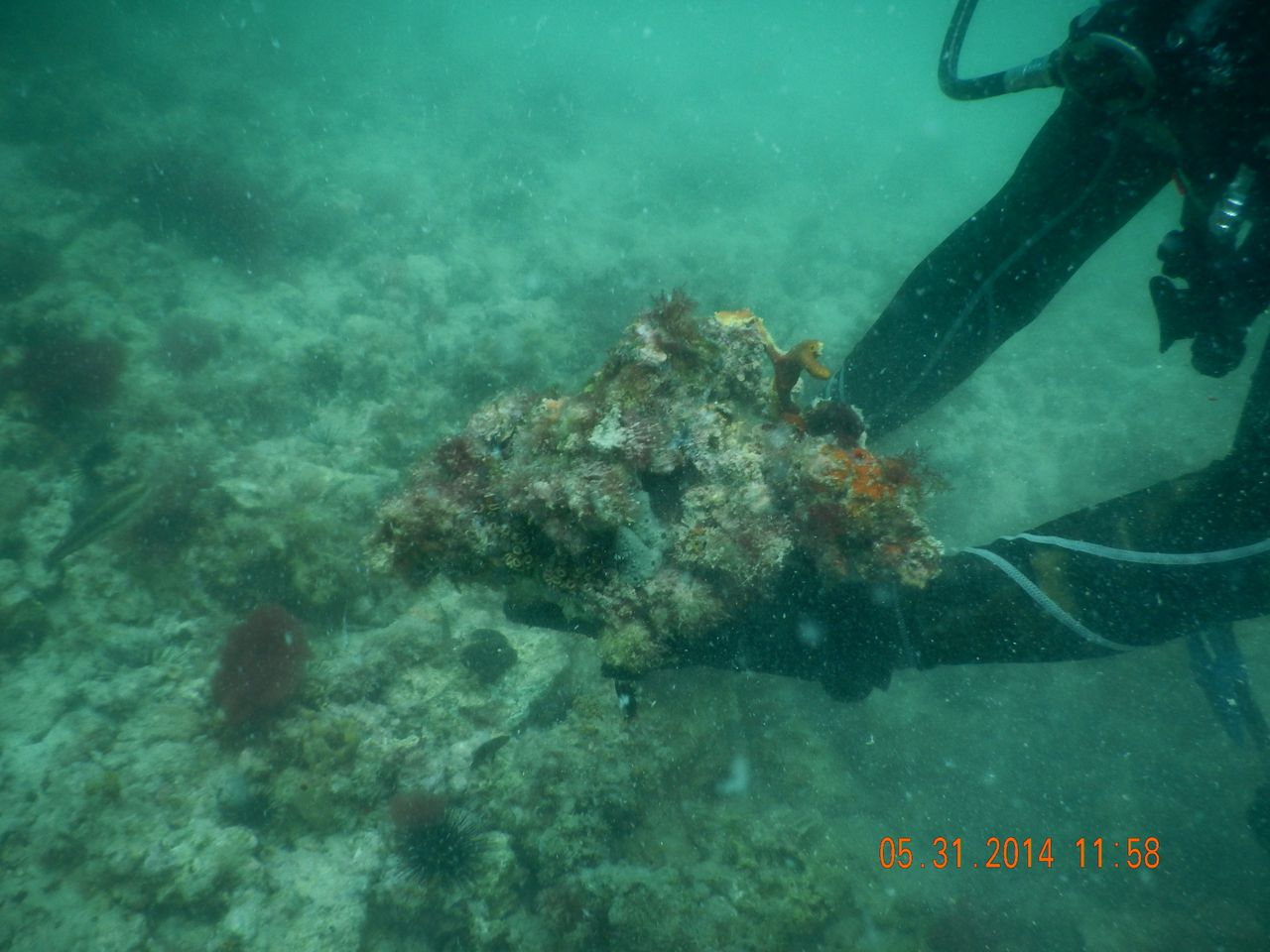
Aquacultured live rock formed by planting mined limestone on a lease site in the Gulf of Mexico

Live rock is harvested for use in the aquarium from reefs, either from natural or human breakage. It may also be "seeded" from small coralline rocks by an aquaculturalist in warm ocean water, to be harvested later. Live rock can also be seeded by adding base rock to an active reef aquarium that already has live rock. Live rock harbors a wide variety of corals, algae, sponges, and other invertebrates, when they are collected. Corals added to the aquarium later will often become attached to the rock.

== Purpose ==
Live rock is highly valued in the aquarium trade. It introduces a diverse array of bacteria, algae, and invertebrates to the closed marine environment and functions as a superior biological filter that hosts aerobic and anaerobic nitrifying bacteria required for the nitrogen cycle that processes waste. Live rock becomes the main biological nitrification base or biological filter of a saltwater aquarium. Harmful elements dissolved in the water of the aquarium, including ammonia, phosphates, and nitrates, are processed with the help of the organisms that are introduced from the live rock into the aquarium's ecosystem. Excess ammonia, nitrate, and phosphates are eliminated with the help of the algae and corals growing on the live rock's surface, while other bacteria supplement the process and restore balance in the water chemistry. Additionally, live rocks have a stabilizing effect on the water chemistry, in particular on helping to maintain constant pH by release of calcium carbonate. Lastly, live rock, especially when encrusted with multiple species of coralline algae (producing differing colors), becomes a major decorative element of the aquarium and provides shelter for the inhabitants. It is often used to build caves, arches, overhangs, or other structures in the tank, a practice known as aquascaping.

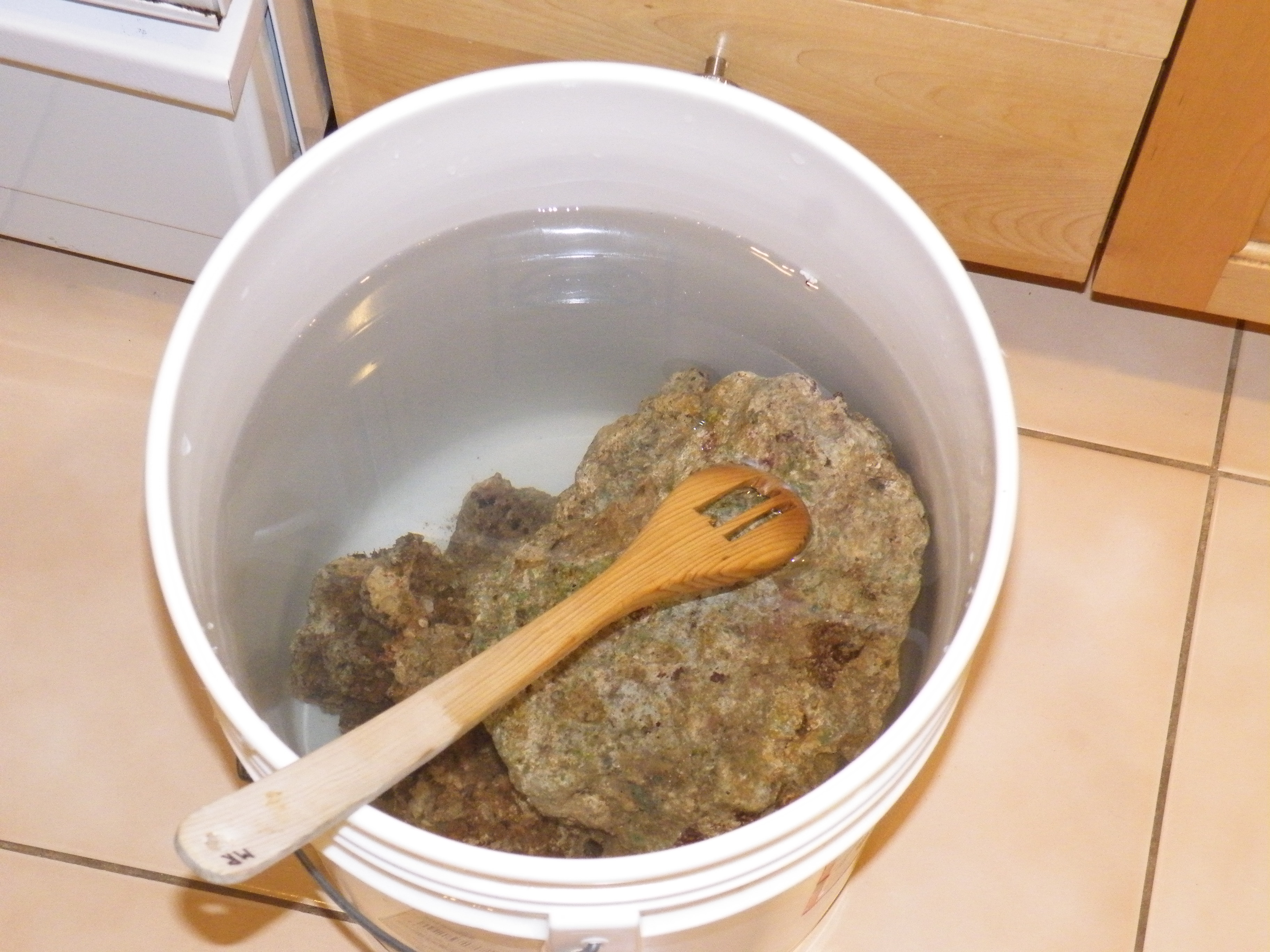
Live rock prior to installation into a reef tank

In J. Charles Delbeek's article Your First Reef Aquarium, he states,

The use of live rock immediately introduces into the aquarium numerous algae, bacteria and small invertebrates all of which contribute to the overall quality of the aquarium water. Live rock has just as much, if not more, surface area for bacteria than a trickle filter. Since live rock in the aquarium contains various types of bacteria, algae and corals, waste products such as ammonia, nitrate and phosphate can have a number of fates. Ammonia, nitrate and phosphate are readily assimilated by algae and photosynthetic corals growing on and in the rock. Ammonia can also be quickly converted into nitrate by the bacteria on and in the rock. This nitrate can be either absorbed by the algae and corals, or it can be denitrified by bacteria in close proximity to the nitrate-producing bacteria."

Live rock must however be cured prior to aquarium installation. Many of the organisms that previously lived in the rock would have died off during the harvesting and transportation process posing a risk to an immature aquarium of rapid ammonia production due to the dead organisms decomposing. To combat this a curing process must be carried out involving leaving the rock to sit in water for up to several weeks to ensure all dead organisms have decomposed and no longer pose a threat to water quality.

== Types ==
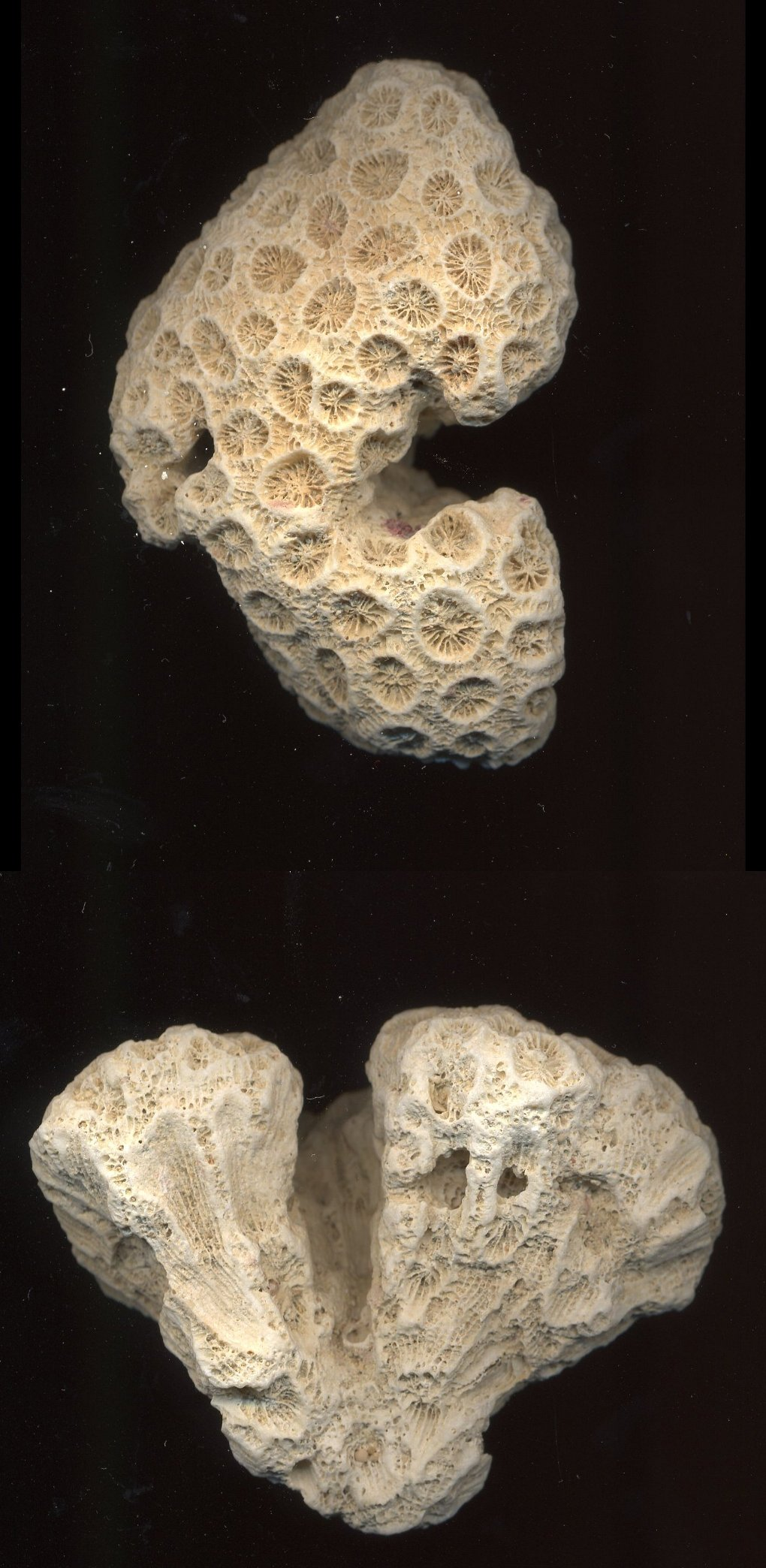
Bleached coral skeletons, which can be inhabited by micro- and macro-organisms to form live rock

There are many different types of live rock. Each is named after the area from which it originated. A large amount of live rock comes from the Southern Pacific region, in areas such as Fiji, Tonga, and the Marshall Islands, as well as from the Caribbean. Each has its own distinct qualities that make it preferable to certain reef aquarists. For instance, live rock from the Fiji region is often porous and large, and rock from the Tonga region is often dense and elongated.

=== Base rock ===
Base rock, or dry rock, is a generic term for aragonite rock that has no organisms growing in or on the rock. Base rock is often used as filler rock in the aquarium as it is much cheaper to purchase than live rock. In time, base rock will become colonized by living organisms.

Recently base rock that is mined from inland ancient reefs has become a popular way to keep the aquarium trade going sustainably. This rock is either maricultured and sold as live rock, or can be purchased and grown in the home aquarium.

Base rock can also be made from artificial rock called aragocrete, which is a hand made concrete from combining crushed aragonite, sand, and Portland cement. After allowing the cement to dry, the pieces are sometimes acid washed to counteract the high pH of the materials, and then allowed to soak in clean water for one or more months. They generally tend to be heavier and less attractive when compared to natural base rock.

== Collection ban ==
In 2008, CITES (Convention on International Trade in Endangered Species) banned the collection of live rock from Tonga, the Marshall Islands, and the Cook Islands. This is due to the over-collecting of rock in these areas. This ban remains in effect as of late 2021.
