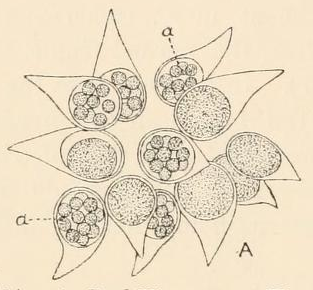
- Burkillia cornuta

Scientific classification
- Kingdom: Plantae
- Division: Chlorophyta
- Class: Chlorophyceae
- Order: Chlamydomonadales
- Family: Chlorochytriaceae; Setchell & N.L.Gardner

Genera
- Botryokoryne Reisigl; Burkillia West & G.S.West; Chlorochytrium Cohn; Phyllobium Klebs; Rhodochytrium Lagerheim

= Chlorochytriaceae =

Family of algae

Chlorochytriaceae is a family of algae within the order Chlamydomonadales. Alternatively, it shows some morphological similarity to Characiosiphonaceae and closely related to it. It contains a number of parasitic taxa endophytic within vascular plants, mosses, or other algae.

The family Chlorochytriaceae consists of microscopic organisms which are unicellular or multicellular, with relatively large cells (up to 400 μm long); the cells may have an secondarily thickened cell wall or rhizoidal extensions. Chloroplasts are usually parietally located, and may be divided into complex lobes and/or contain pyrenoids. Cells contain one or more nuclei. Reproduction occurs via zoospores with two flagella; sexual reproduction via gametes may also occur. This family appears to be an artificial assemblage of different parasitic genera. The genus Scotinosphaera was once classified in this family, but due to molecular evidence it has been placed in its own order (Scotinosphaerales) within Ulvophyceae.
