= Algae =

Diverse group of photosynthetic organisms

- Organisms that perform oxygenic photosynthesis, except land plants
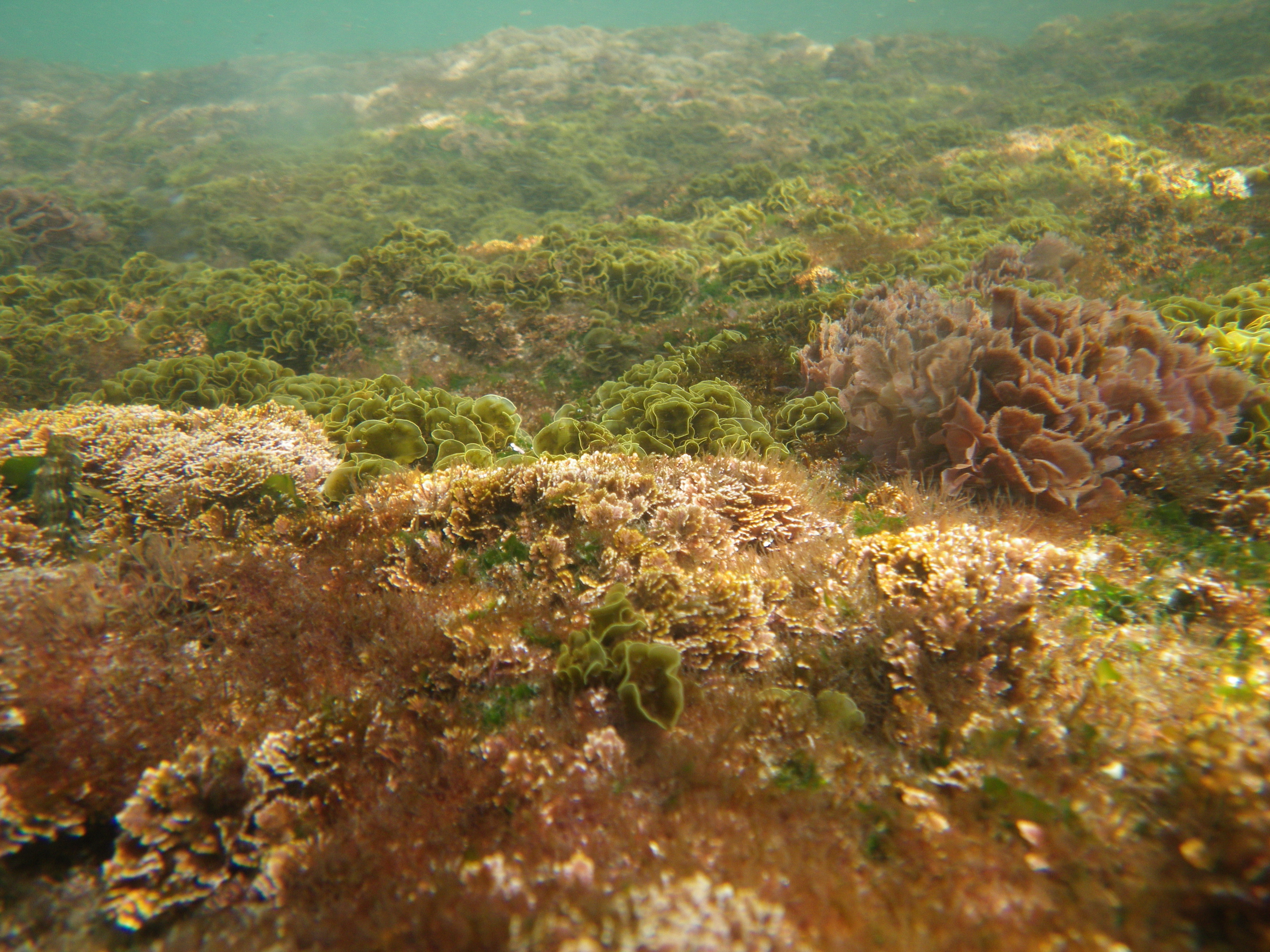
- Marine algae growing on the sea bed in shallow waters

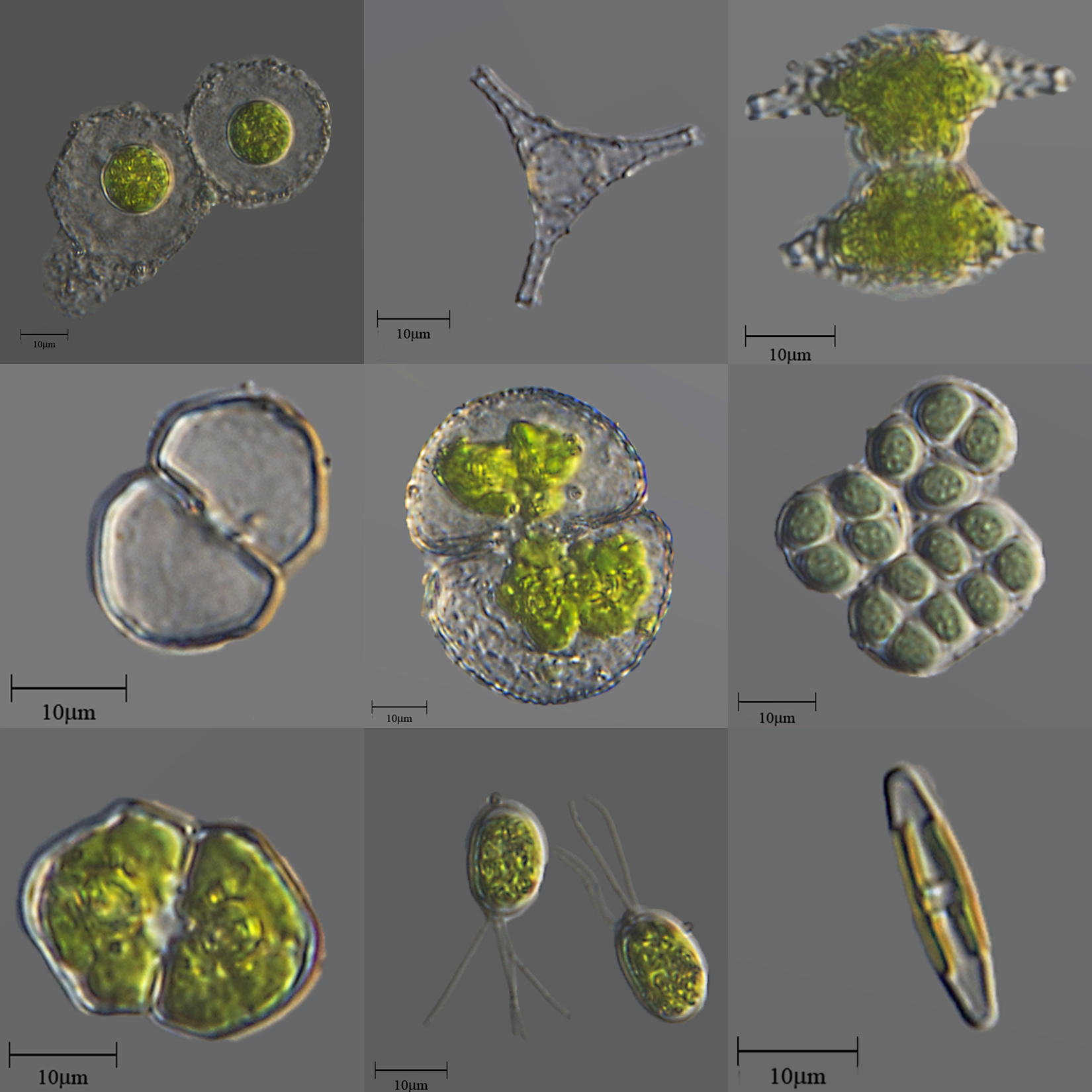
- Freshwater microscopic unicellular and colonial algae

Traditional algal divisions
- Prokaryotic: Cyanobacteria
- Eukaryotic (primary endosymbiosis): Glaucophyta, Rhodophyta, Prasinodermophyta, Chlorophyta, Charophyta*
- Eukaryotic (secondary endosymbiosis): Chlorarachniophyta, Chromeridophyta, Cryptista (partially), Dinoflagellata, Euglenophyta (partially), Haptophyta, Heterokontophyta
- *paraphyletic, it excludes land plants

Diversity
- Living: 50,605 species
- Fossil: 10,556 species

Algae (/ˈældʒiː/ AL-jee, UK also /ˈælɡiː/ AL-ghee; sing.: alga /ˈælɡə/) are any of a large and diverse group of photosynthetic organisms. It excludes the land plants (embryophytes). Such organisms range from microscopic unicellular microalgae (including cyanobacteria and phytoplankton) to seaweeds, multicellular macroalgae which may grow up to 50 metres (160 ft) in length. Most algae are aquatic (especially marine), and some form cohesive colonies. Freshwater algae include Charophyta such as the filamentous Spirogyra and the grasslike stoneworts. Most algae are plankton carried passively by water, although some macroalgae have holdfasts for anchorage.

Algae are polyphyletic as they have multiple evolutionary origins. Although algae with two-membraned chloroplasts seem to form a paraphyletic group within the clade Archaeplastida, other algae with chloroplasts that have three or more membranes evolved from protists that acquired photosynthesis after engulfing archaeplastids. Chlorophytes, rhodophytes (red algae) and glaucophytes (grey algae) have primary chloroplasts directly derived from endosymbiont cyanobacteria, while diatoms, cryptomonads, euglenoids and phaeophyceae (brown algae) have secondary chloroplasts derived from indirectly endosymbiont red algae or green algae.

Most algae are single-celled organisms without roots, leaves, or stems. Most are photoautotrophs and the main primary producers of aquatic ecosystems, although some are mixotrophs that derive metabolic energy both from internal photosynthesis and from foraging external nutrients. Some unicellular algae have become heterotrophs or parasites, relying entirely on external energy sources. Algae have photosynthetic machinery ultimately derived from cyanobacteria that produce oxygen by splitting water molecules, unlike photosynthetic bacteria. Fossilized filamentous algae from the Vindhya basin have been dated to 1.6 to 1.7 billion years ago.

Because of the wide range of types of algae, there is a correspondingly wide range of industrial and traditional applications in human society. Traditional seaweed farming practices have existed for thousands of years and have strong traditions in East Asian food cultures. More modern algaculture applications extend the food traditions for other applications, including cattle feed, using algae for bioremediation or pollution control, transforming sunlight into algae fuels or other chemicals used in industrial processes, and in medical and scientific applications.

== Etymology ==
The singular alga is the Latin word for "seaweed" and retains that meaning in English. The etymology is obscure. Although some speculate that it is related to Latin algēre, "be cold", no reason is known to associate seaweed with temperature. A more likely source is alliga, "binding, entwining".

The Ancient Greek word for "seaweed" was φῦκος (phŷkos), which could mean either the seaweed (probably red algae) or a red dye derived from it. The Latinization, fūcus, meant primarily the cosmetic rouge. The etymology is uncertain, but a strong candidate has long been some word related to the Biblical פוך (pūk), "paint" (if not that word itself), a cosmetic eye-shadow used by the Ancient Egyptians and other inhabitants of the eastern Mediterranean. It could be any color: black, red, green, or blue.

The study of algae is most commonly called phycology (from Greek phykos 'seaweed'); the term algology is falling out of use.

== Description ==
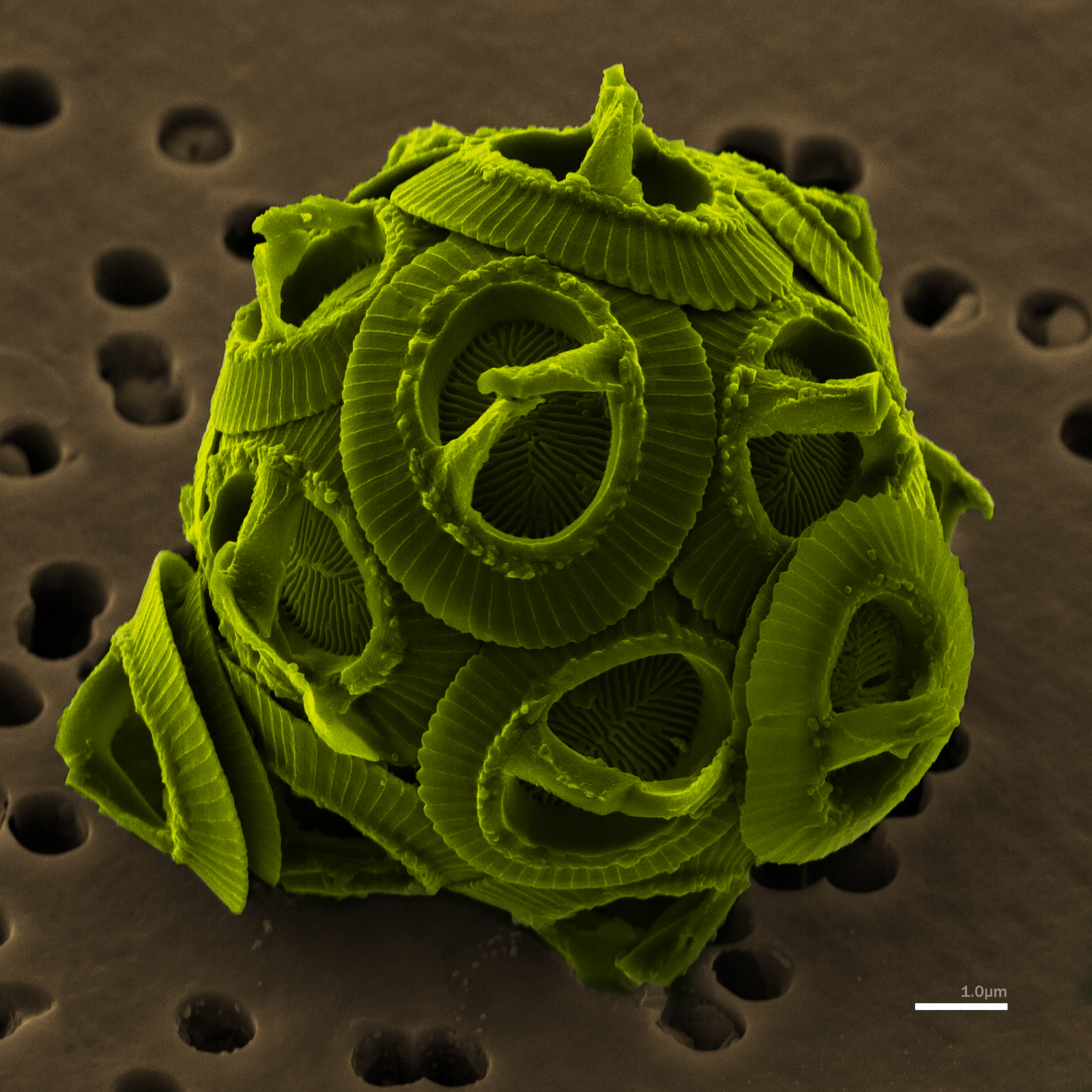
False-color scanning electron micrograph of the unicellular coccolithophore Gephyrocapsa oceanica

The algae are a heterogeneous group of mostly photosynthetic organisms that produce oxygen and lack the reproductive features and structural complexity of land plants. This concept includes the cyanobacteria, which are prokaryotes, and all photosynthetic protists, which are eukaryotes. They contain chlorophyll a as their primary photosynthetic pigment, and generally inhabit aquatic environments.

However, there are many exceptions to this definition. Many non-photosynthetic protists are included in the study of algae, such as the heterotrophic relatives of euglenophytes or the numerous species of colorless algae that have lost their chlorophyll during evolution (e.g., Prototheca). Some exceptional species of algae tolerate dry terrestrial habitats, such as soil, rocks, or caves hidden from light sources, although they still need enough moisture to become active.

=== Morphology ===
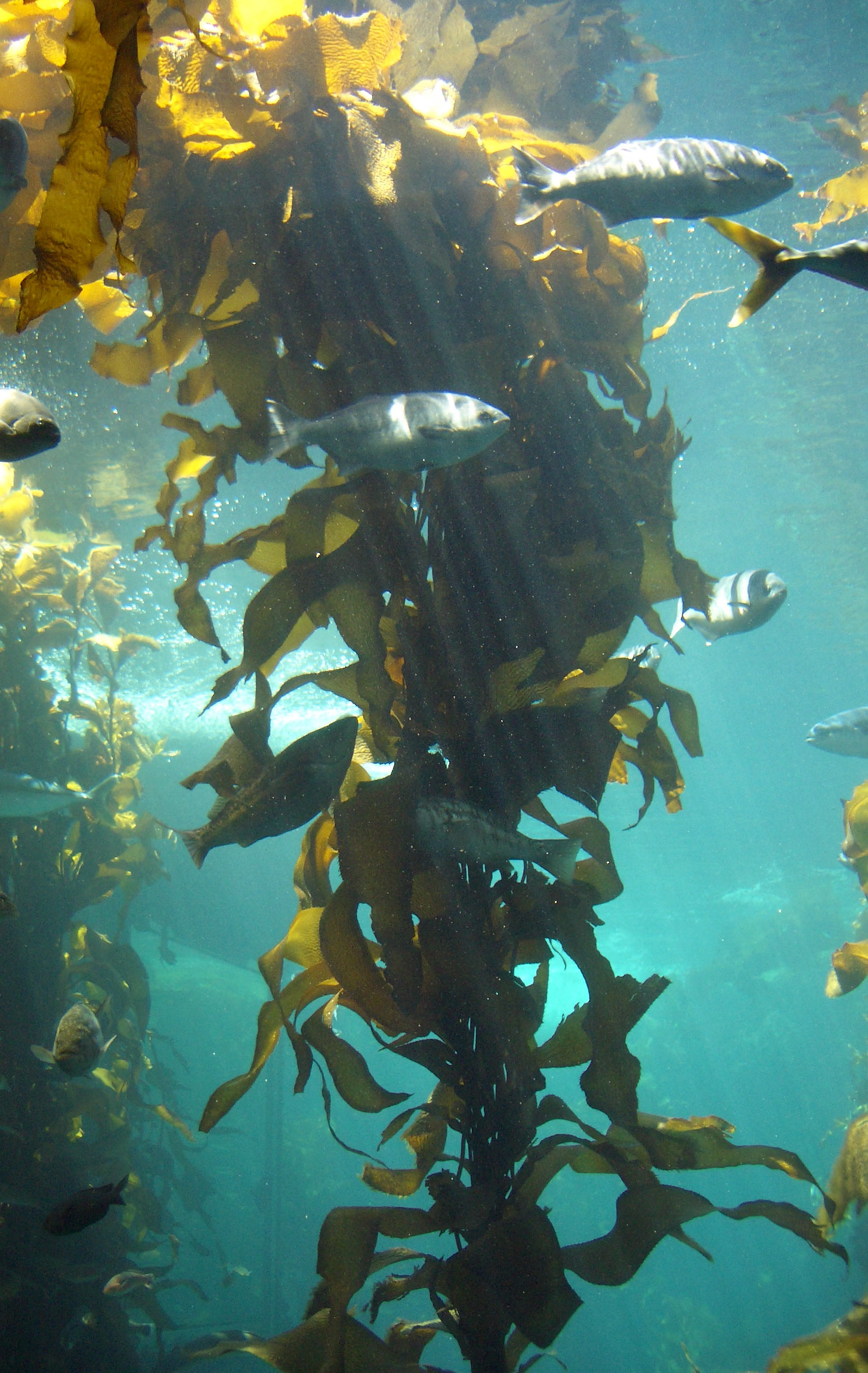
The kelp forest exhibit at the Monterey Bay Aquarium: A three-dimensional, multicellular thallus

A range of algal morphologies is exhibited, and convergence of features in unrelated groups is common. The only groups to exhibit three-dimensional multicellular thalli are the reds and browns, and some chlorophytes. Apical growth is constrained to subsets of these groups: the florideophyte reds, various browns, and the charophytes. The form of charophytes is quite different from those of reds and browns, because they have distinct nodes, separated by internode 'stems'; whorls of branches reminiscent of the horsetails occur at the nodes. Conceptacles are another polyphyletic trait; they appear in the coralline algae and the Hildenbrandiales, as well as the browns.

Most of the simpler algae are unicellular flagellates or amoeboids, but colonial and nonmotile forms have developed independently among several of the groups. Some of the more common organizational levels, more than one of which may occur in the lifecycle of a species, are

- Colonial: small, regular groups of motile cells
- Capsoid: individual non-motile cells embedded in mucilage
- Coccoid: individual non-motile cells with cell walls
- Palmelloid: nonmotile cells embedded in mucilage
- Filamentous: a string of connected nonmotile cells, sometimes branching
- Parenchymatous: cells forming a thallus with partial differentiation of tissues

In three lines, even higher levels of organization have been reached, with full tissue differentiation. These are the brown algae,—some of which may reach 50 m in length (kelps)—the red algae, and the green algae. The most complex forms are found among the charophyte algae (see Charales and Charophyta), in a lineage that eventually led to the higher land plants. The innovation that defines these nonalgal plants is the presence of female reproductive organs with protective cell layers that protect the zygote and developing embryo. Hence, the land plants are referred to as the Embryophytes.

==== Turfs ====
The term algal turf is commonly used but poorly defined. Algal turfs are thick, carpet-like beds of seaweed that retain sediment and compete with foundation species like corals and kelps, and they are usually less than 15 cm tall. Such a turf may consist of one or more species, and will generally cover an area in the order of a square metre or more. Some common characteristics are listed:

- Algae that form aggregations that have been described as turfs include diatoms, cyanobacteria, chlorophytes, phaeophytes and rhodophytes. Turfs are often composed of numerous species at a wide range of spatial scales, but monospecific turfs are frequently reported.
- Turfs can be morphologically highly variable over geographic scales and even within species on local scales and can be difficult to identify in terms of the constituent species.
- Turfs have been defined as short algae, but this has been used to describe height ranges from less than 0.5 cm to more than 10 cm. In some regions, the descriptions approached heights which might be described as canopies (20 to 30 cm).

=== Physiology ===
Many algae, particularly species of Characeae, have served as model experimental organisms to understand the mechanisms of the water permeability of membranes, osmoregulation, salt tolerance, cytoplasmic streaming, and the generation of action potentials. Plant hormones are found not only in higher plants, but in algae, too.

=== Life cycle ===
Rhodophyta, Chlorophyta, and Heterokontophyta, the three main algal divisions, have life cycles which show considerable variation and complexity. In general, an asexual phase exists where the seaweed's cells are diploid, a sexual phase where the cells are haploid, followed by fusion of the male and female gametes. Asexual reproduction permits efficient population increases, but less variation is possible. Commonly, in sexual reproduction of unicellular and colonial algae, two specialized, sexually compatible, haploid gametes make physical contact and fuse to form a zygote. To ensure a successful mating, the development and release of gametes is highly synchronized and regulated; pheromones may play a key role in these processes. Sexual reproduction allows for more variation and provides the benefit of efficient recombinational repair of DNA damage during meiosis, a key stage of the sexual cycle. However, sexual reproduction is more costly than asexual reproduction. Meiosis has been shown to occur in many different species of algae.

== Classification ==
=== Brief history ===
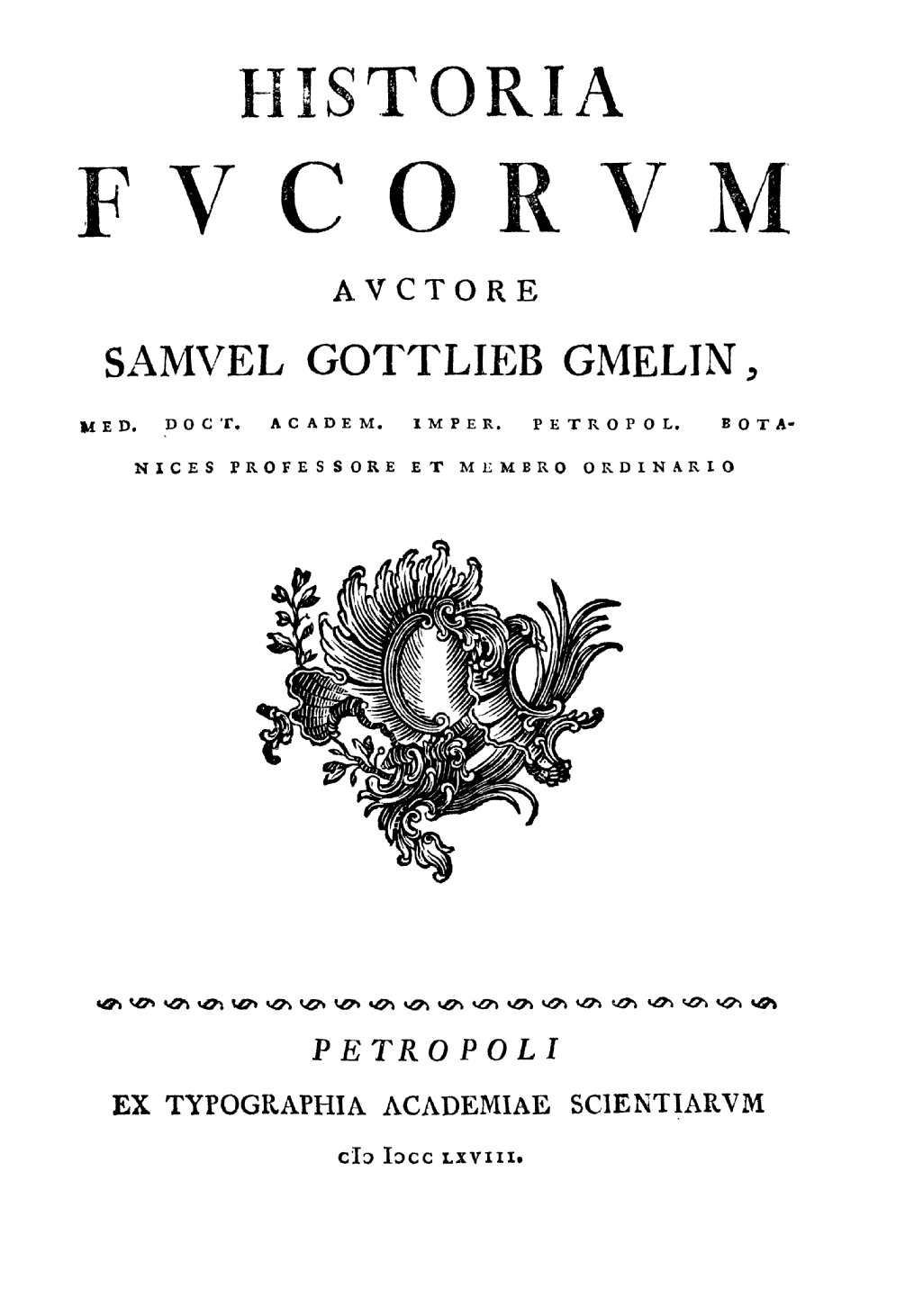
Title page of Gmelin's Historia Fucorum, dated 1768

Linnaeus, in Species Plantarum (1753), the starting point for modern botanical nomenclature, recognized 14 genera of algae, of which only four are currently considered among algae. In Systema Naturae, Linnaeus described the genera Volvox and Corallina, and a species of Acetabularia (as Madrepora), among the animals.

In 1768, Samuel Gottlieb Gmelin (1744–1774) published the Historia Fucorum, the first work dedicated to marine algae and the first book on marine biology to use the then new binomial nomenclature of Linnaeus. It included elaborate illustrations of seaweed and marine algae on folded leaves.

W. H. Harvey (1811–1866) and Lamouroux (1813) were the first to divide macroscopic algae into four divisions based on their pigmentation. This is the first use of a biochemical criterion in plant systematics. Harvey's four divisions are: red algae (Rhodospermae), brown algae (Melanospermae), green algae (Chlorospermae), and Diatomaceae.

At this time, microscopic algae were discovered and reported by a different group of workers (e.g., O. F. Müller and Ehrenberg) studying the Infusoria (microscopic organisms). Unlike macroalgae, which were clearly viewed as plants, microalgae were frequently considered animals because they are often motile. Even the nonmotile (coccoid) microalgae were sometimes merely seen as stages of the lifecycle of plants, macroalgae, or animals.

Although used as a taxonomic category in some pre-Darwinian classifications, e.g., Linnaeus (1753), de Jussieu (1789), Lamouroux (1813), Harvey (1836), Horaninow (1843), Agassiz (1859), Wilson & Cassin (1864), in further classifications, the "algae" are seen as an artificial, polyphyletic group.

Throughout the 20th century, most classifications treated the following groups as divisions or classes of algae: cyanophytes, rhodophytes, chrysophytes, xanthophytes, bacillariophytes, phaeophytes, pyrrhophytes (cryptophytes and dinophytes), euglenophytes, and chlorophytes. Later, many new groups were discovered (e.g., Bolidophyceae), and others were splintered from older groups: charophytes and glaucophytes (from chlorophytes), many heterokontophytes (e.g., synurophytes from chrysophytes, or eustigmatophytes from xanthophytes), haptophytes (from chrysophytes), and chlorarachniophytes (from xanthophytes).

With the abandonment of plant-animal dichotomous classification, most groups of algae (sometimes all) were included in Protista, later also abandoned in favour of Eukaryota. However, as a legacy of the older plant life scheme, some groups that were also treated as protozoans in the past still have duplicated classifications (see ambiregnal protists).

Some parasitic algae (e.g., the green algae Prototheca and Helicosporidium, parasites of metazoans, or Cephaleuros, parasites of plants) were originally classified as fungi, sporozoans, or protistans of incertae sedis, while others (e.g., the green algae Phyllosiphon and Rhodochytrium, parasites of plants, or the red algae Pterocladiophila and Gelidiocolax mammillatus, parasites of other red algae, or the dinoflagellates Oodinium, parasites of fish) had their relationship with algae conjectured early. In other cases, some groups were originally characterized as parasitic algae (e.g., Chlorochytrium), but later were seen as endophytic algae. Some filamentous bacteria (e.g., Beggiatoa) were originally seen as algae. Furthermore, groups like the apicomplexans are also parasites derived from ancestors that possessed plastids, but are not included in any group traditionally seen as algae.

=== Taxonomic diversity ===
The most recent estimate (as of January 2024) documents 50,605 living and 10,556 fossil algal species, according to the online database AlgaeBase. (Note: Chlorarachniophytes were omitted from the 2024 AlgaeBase species report. The numbers shown here for the order Chlorarachniales were obtained from the 13th edition of Syllabus der Pflanzenfamilien (2015), where it contains 8 genera and 14 species total. The two remaining chlorarachniophyte genera, Minorisa and Rhabdamoeba, have one species each.) (Note: The photosynthetic species of Paulinella classified into the rhizarian phylum Cercozoa were also omitted from the 2024 AlgaeBase species report. Four such species are known (as of August 2025) – P. chromatophora, P. micropora, P. acadia, and P. longichromatophora. Their photosynthetic organelle referred to as a 'cyanelle' or 'chromatophore' originated in a primary endosymbiosis different from that of the plastids of other algae.) They are classified into 15 phyla or divisions. Some phyla are not photosynthetic, namely Picophyta and Rhodelphidophyta, but they are included in the database due to their close relationship with red algae.

phylum (division)	described genera	described species		
phylum (division)	described genera	living	fossil	total
"Charophyta" (Streptophyta without land plants)	236	4,940	704	5,644
Chlorarachniophyta	10	16	0	16
Chlorophyta	1,513	6,851	1,083	7,934
Chromerida	6	8	0	8
Cryptista (not all species are algae)	44	245	0	245
Cyanobacteria	866	4,669	1,054	5,723
Dinoflagellata (Dinophyta)	710	2,956	955	3,911
Euglenophyta (not all species are algae)	164	2,037	20	2,057
Glaucophyta	8	25	0	25
Haptophyta	391	517	1205	1,722
Heterokontophyta	1,781	21,052	2,262	23,314
Picozoa	1	1	0	1
Prasinodermophyta	5	10	0	10
Rhodelphidia	1	2	0	2
Rhodophyta	1,094	7,276	278	7,554
Incertae sedis fossils	887	0	2,995	2,995
Total	7,717	50,605	10,556	61,161

The various algal phyla can be differentiated according to several biological traits. They have distinct morphologies, photosynthetic pigmentation, storage products, cell wall composition, and mechanisms of carbon concentration. Some phyla have unique cellular structures.

=== Prokaryotic algae ===
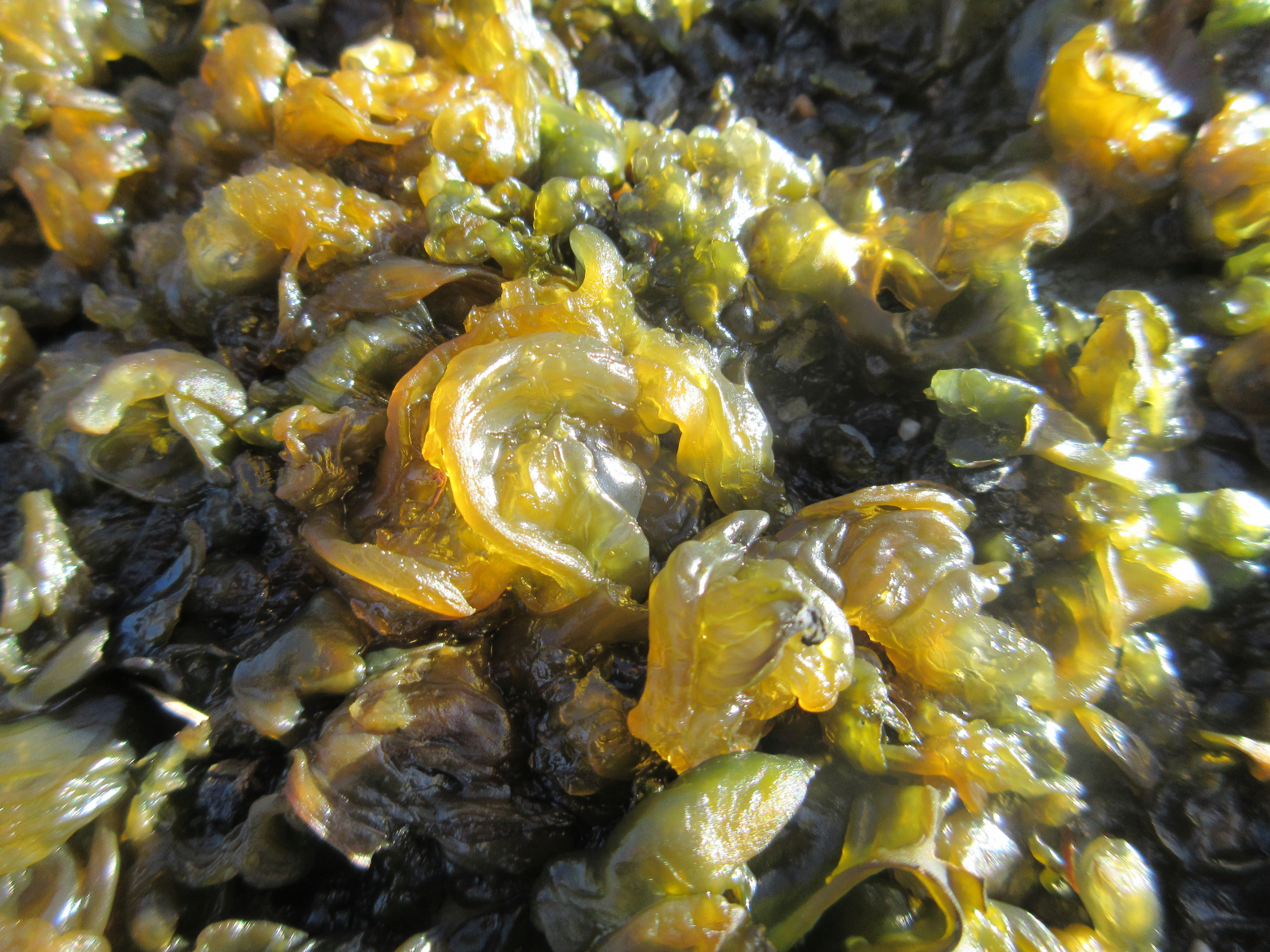

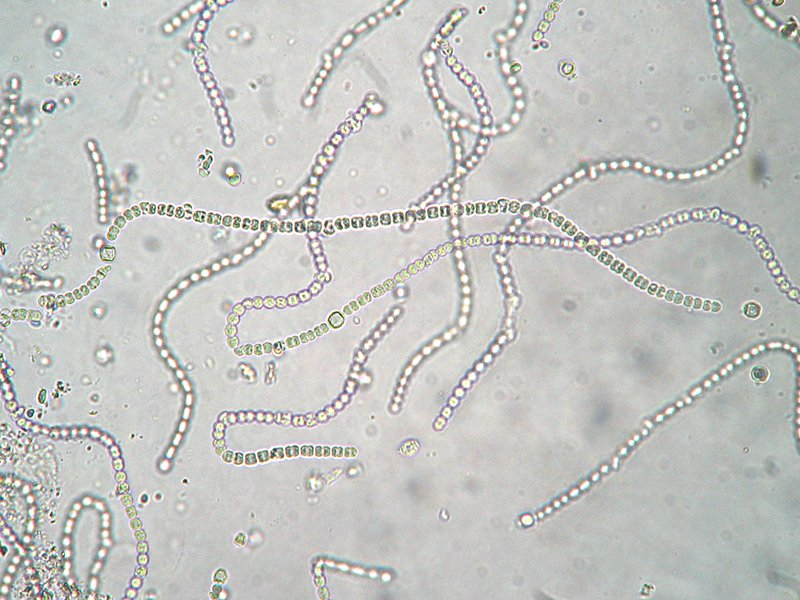
Macro- and microscopic photographs of Nostoc, the most common genus of cyanobacteria.

Among prokaryotes, five major groups of bacteria have evolved the ability to photosynthesize, including heliobacteria, green sulfur and nonsulfur bacteria and proteobacteria. However, the only lineage where oxygenic photosynthesis has evolved is in the cyanobacteria, often known as blue-green algae for their blue-green (cyan) coloration. They are classified as the phylum Cyanobacteriota or Cyanophyta. However, this phylum also includes two classes of non-photosynthetic bacteria: Melainabacteria (also called Vampirovibrionia or Vampirovibrionophyceae) and Sericytochromatia (also known as Blackallbacteria). A third class contains the photosynthetic ones, known as Cyanophyceae (also called Cyanobacteriia or Oxyphotobacteria).

As bacteria, their cells lack membrane-bound organelles, with the exception of thylakoids. Like other algae, cyanobacteria have chlorophyll a as their primary photosynthetic pigment. Their accessory pigments include phycobilins (phycoerythrobilin and phycocyanobilin), carotenoids and, in some cases, b, d, or f chlorophylls, generally distributed in phycobilisomes found in the surface of thylakoids. They display a variety of body forms, such as single cells, colonies, and unbranched or branched filaments. Their cells are commonly covered in a sheath of mucilage, and they also have a typical gram-negative bacterial cell wall composed largely of peptidoglycan. They have various storage particles, including cyanophycin as aminoacid and nitrogen reserves, "cyanophycean starch" (similar to plant amylose) for carbohydrates, and lipid droplets. Their Rubisco enzymes are concentrated in carboxysomes. They occupy a diverse array of aquatic and terrestrial habitats, including extreme environments from hot springs to polar glaciers. Some are subterranean, living via hydrogen-based lithoautotrophy instead of photosynthesis.

Three lineages of cyanobacteria, Prochloraceae, Prochlorothrix and Prochlorococcus, independently evolved to have chlorophylls a and b instead of phycobilisomes. Due to their different pigmentation, they were historically grouped in a separate division, Prochlorophyta, as this is the typical pigmentation seen in green algae (e.g., chlorophytes). Eventually, this classification became obsolete, as it is a polyphyletic grouping.

Cyanobacteria are included as algae by most phycological sources and by the International Code of Nomenclature for algae, fungi, and plants, although a few authors exclude them from the definition of algae and reserve the term for eukaryotes only.

=== Eukaryotic algae ===
Eukaryotic algae contain chloroplasts that are similar in structure to cyanobacteria. Chloroplasts contain circular DNA like that in cyanobacteria and are interpreted as representing reduced endosymbiotic cyanobacteria. However, the exact origin of the chloroplasts is different among separate lineages of algae, reflecting their acquisition during different endosymbiotic events. Many groups contain some members that are no longer photosynthetic. Some retain plastids, but not chloroplasts, while others have lost plastids entirely.

==== Primary algae ====
Primary algae are those with "primary chloroplasts", i.e. chloroplasts with two membranes, evolved through a single symbiogenetic event with an endosymbiont β-cyanobacterium as early as 1.6 Gya during the Mesoproterozoic. These algae are mainly grouped in the clade Archaeplastida (meaning "ancient plastid"), which includes the major groups Viridiplantae (green algae sensu lato and all land plants) and Rhodophyta (red algae) as well as the minor group Glaucophyta (grey algae). The chloroplasts of red algae have chlorophyll a and c (often) and phycobilins, with extra-plastid starch storage; green algae chloroplasts have chlorophyll a and b without phycobilins, with intra-plastid starch storage; while grey algae chloroplasts have chlorophylls similar to red algae, but with a peptidoglycan outer layer. Land plants (embryophytes) are pigmented similarly to green algae and likely evolved from the freshwater green algae clade Streptophyta, which is sister taxon to Chlorophyta (green algae sensu stricto) and the basal clade Prasinodermophyta.

There is also a minor group of amoeboid protists with primary plastids evolved via different origin and at a much later date than archaeplastid chloroplasts. The four species of the euglyphid amoebae genus Paulinella, have cyanobionts (known as cyanelles) that perform photosynthesis, likely originated from the endosymbiosis of a α-cyanobacterium (probably an ancestral member of Chroococcales), about 90–140 Mya during the Cretaceous.

==== Secondary algae ====
Secondary algae are eukaryotes with "secondary chloroplasts", i.e. those evolved from phagocytosis and subsequent endosymbiosis of primary algae (mainly green or red algae) or other secondary algae, thus "stealing" the endosymbionts' photosynthetic capability. As a result, these algae have chloroplasts surrounded by three or more membranes, and appeared independently in various distantly related protist lineages.

Two lineages of secondary algae, chlorarachniophytes and euglenophytes have "green" chloroplasts containing chlorophylls a and b. Their chloroplasts are surrounded by four and three membranes, respectively, and were probably retained from ingested green algae.

- Chlorarachniophytes, which belong to the phylum Cercozoa, contain a small nucleomorph, which is a relict of the algae's nucleus.
- Euglenophytes, which belong to the phylum Euglenozoa, live primarily in fresh water and have chloroplasts with only three membranes. The endosymbiotic green algae may have been acquired through myzocytosis rather than phagocytosis.
- Another group with green algae endosymbionts is the dinoflagellate genus Lepidodinium, which has replaced its original endosymbiont of red algal origin with one of green algal origin. A nucleomorph is present, and the host genome still have several red algal genes acquired through endosymbiotic gene transfer. Also, the euglenid and chlorarachniophyte genome contain genes of apparent red algal ancestry.

Other groups have "red" chloroplasts containing chlorophylls a and c, and phycobilins. The shape can vary; they may be of discoid, plate-like, reticulate, cup-shaped, spiral, or ribbon shaped. They have one or more pyrenoids to preserve protein and starch. The latter chlorophyll type is not known from any prokaryotes or primary chloroplasts, but genetic similarities with red algae suggest a relationship there. In some of these groups, the chloroplast has four membranes, retaining a nucleomorph in cryptomonads, and they likely share a common pigmented ancestor, although other evidence casts doubt on whether the heterokonts, Haptophyta, and cryptomonads are in fact more closely related to each other than to other groups.

The typical dinoflagellate chloroplast has three membranes, but considerable diversity exists in chloroplasts within the group, and a number of endosymbiotic events apparently occurred. The Apicomplexa, a group of closely related parasites, also have plastids called apicoplasts, which are not photosynthetic. The Chromerida are the closest relatives of apicomplexans, and some have retained their chloroplasts. The three alveolate groups evolved from a common myzozoan ancestor that obtained chloroplasts.

== Distribution and habitat ==
The distribution of algal species has been fairly well studied since the founding of phytogeography in the mid-19th century. Algae spread mainly by the dispersal of spores analogously to the dispersal of cryptogamic plants by spores. Spores can be found in a variety of environments: fresh and marine waters, air, soil, and in or on other organisms. Whether a spore is to grow into an adult organism depends on the species and the environmental conditions where the spore lands.

The spores of freshwater algae are dispersed mainly by running water and wind, as well as by living carriers. However, not all bodies of water can carry all species of algae, as the chemical composition of certain water bodies limits the algae that can survive within them. Marine spores are often spread by ocean currents. Ocean water presents many vastly different habitats based on temperature and nutrient availability, resulting in phytogeographic zones, regions, and provinces.

To some degree, the distribution of algae is subject to floristic discontinuities caused by geographical features, such as Antarctica, long distances of ocean or general land masses. It is, therefore, possible to identify species occurring by locality, such as "Pacific algae" or "North Sea algae". When they occur out of their localities, hypothesizing a transport mechanism is usually possible, such as the hulls of ships. For example, Ulva reticulata and U. fasciata travelled from the mainland to Hawaii in this manner.

Mapping is possible for select species only: "there are many valid examples of confined distribution patterns." For example, Clathromorphum is an arctic genus and is not mapped far south of there. However, scientists regard the overall data as insufficient due to the "difficulties of undertaking such studies."

=== Regional algae checklists ===
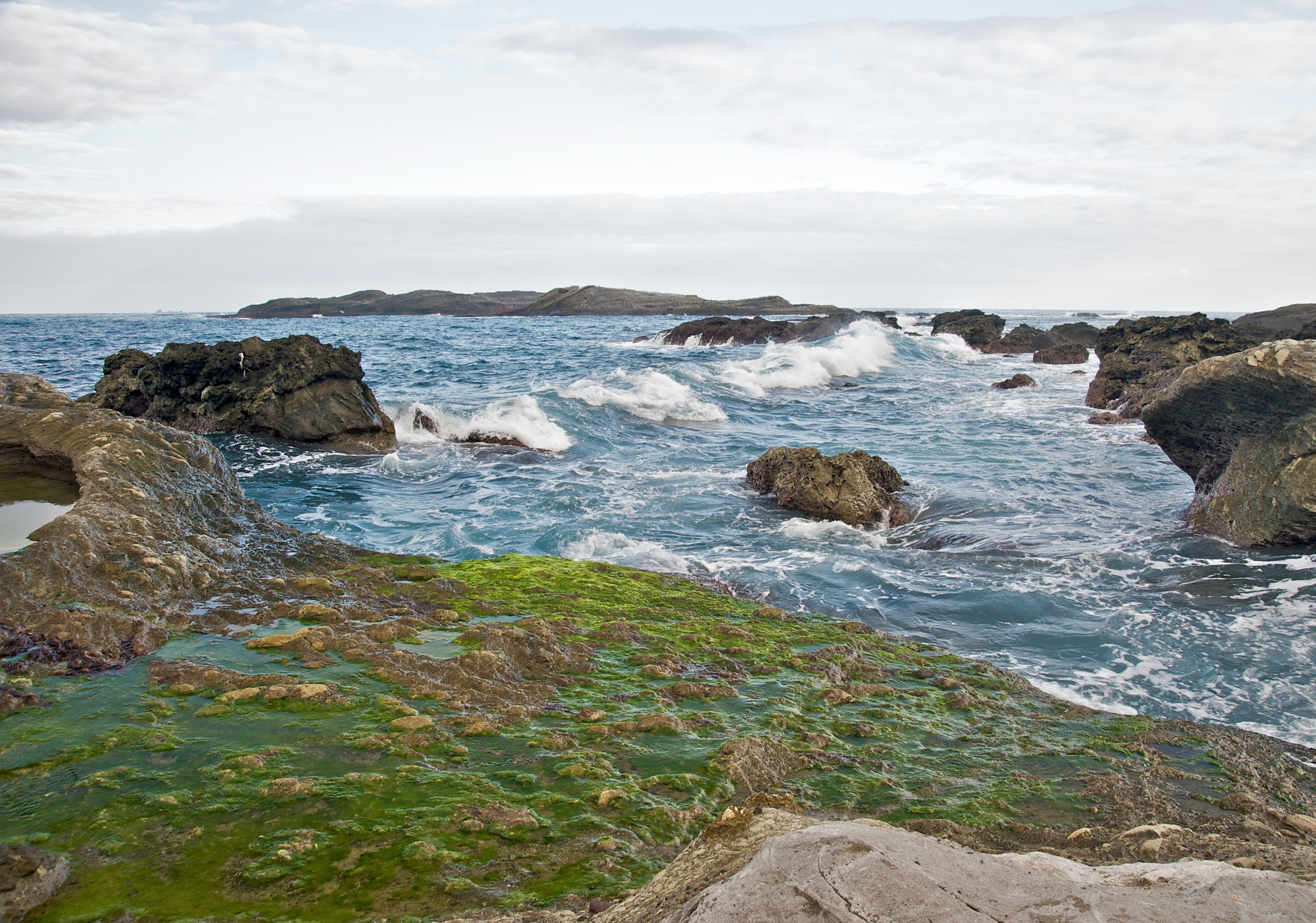
Algae on coastal rocks at Shihtiping in Taiwan

The Algal Collection of the US National Herbarium (located in the National Museum of Natural History) consists of approximately 320,500 dried specimens, which, although not exhaustive (no exhaustive collection exists), gives an idea of the order of magnitude of the number of algal species (that number remains unknown). Estimates vary widely. For example, according to one standard textbook, in the British Isles, the UK Biodiversity Steering Group Report estimated there to be 20,000 algal species in the UK. Another checklist reports only about 5,000 species. Regarding the difference of about 15,000 species, the text concludes: "It will require many detailed field surveys before it is possible to provide a reliable estimate of the total number of species ..."

Regional and group estimates have been made, as well:

- 5,000–7,200 species of red algae worldwide
- "some 1,300 in Australian Seas"
- 400 seaweed species for the western coastline of South Africa, and 212 species from the coast of KwaZulu-Natal. Some of these are duplicates, as the range extends across both coasts, and the total recorded is probably about 500 species. Most of these are listed in List of seaweeds of South Africa. These exclude phytoplankton and crustose corallines.
- 669 marine species from California (US)
- 642 in the check-list of Britain and Ireland

and so on, but lacking any scientific basis or reliable sources, these numbers have no more credibility than the British ones mentioned above. Most estimates also omit microscopic algae, such as phytoplankton.

== Ecology ==
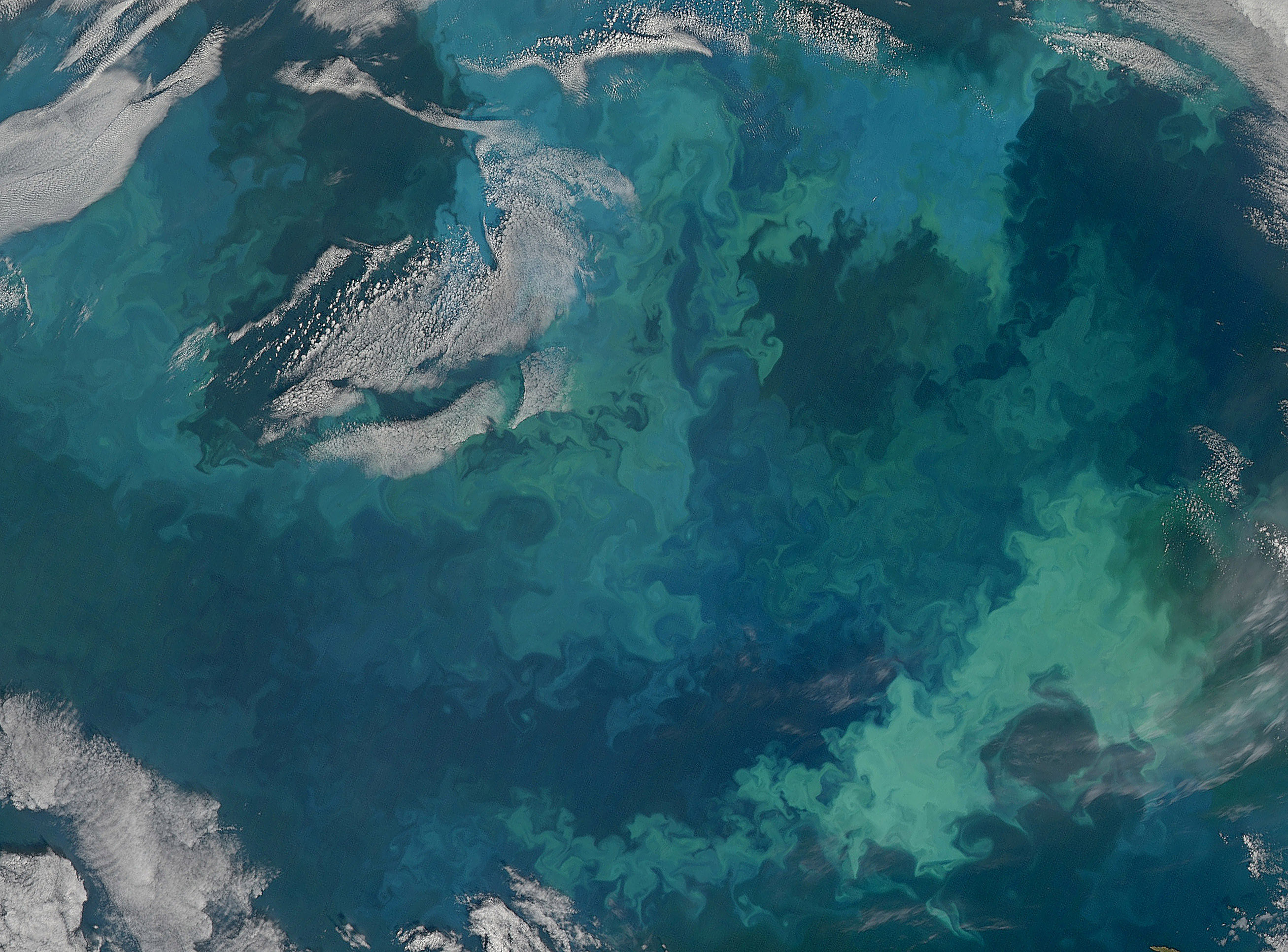
Phytoplankton bloom in the Barents Sea

Algae are prominent in bodies of water, common in terrestrial environments, and are found in unusual environments, such as on snow and ice. Seaweeds grow mostly in shallow marine waters, less than 100 m (330 ft) deep; however, some such as Navicula pennata have been recorded to a depth of 360 m (1,180 ft). A type of algae, Ancylonema nordenskioeldii, was found in Greenland in areas known as the 'Dark Zone', which caused an increase in the rate of melting ice sheet. The same algae was found in the Italian Alps, after pink ice appeared on parts of the Presena glacier.

The various sorts of algae play significant roles in aquatic ecology. Microscopic forms that live suspended in the water column (phytoplankton) provide the food base for most marine food chains. In very high densities (algal blooms), these algae may discolor the water and outcompete, poison, or asphyxiate other life forms.

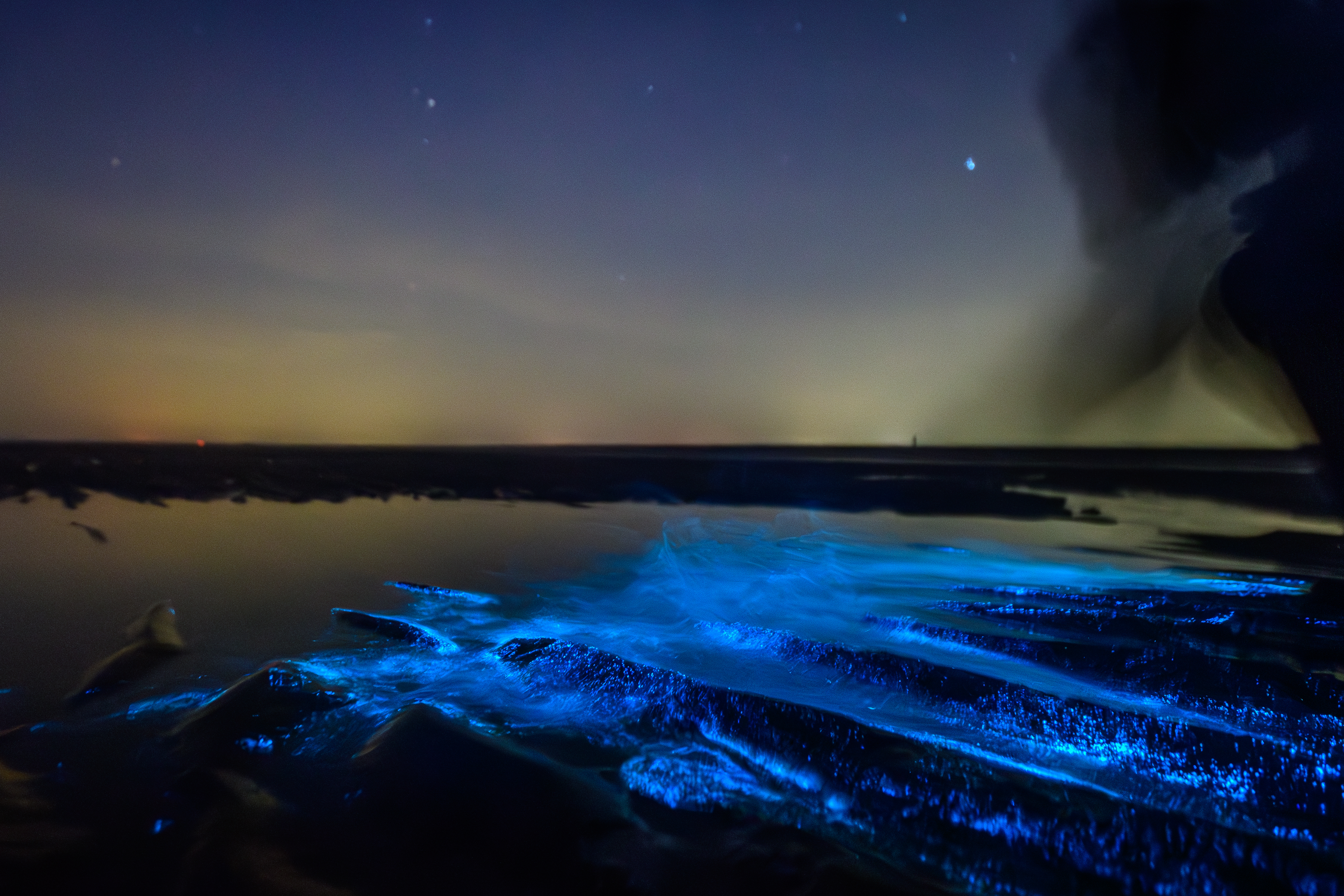
Nighttime display of bioluminescent algae in the water illuminating the shoreline waves at the beach of Norderney

Algae can be used as indicator organisms to monitor pollution in various aquatic systems. In many cases, algal metabolism is sensitive to various pollutants. Due to this, the species composition of algal populations may shift in the presence of chemical pollutants. To detect these changes, algae can be sampled from the environment and maintained in laboratories with relative ease. Some indicator algae in the phylum Dinoflagellata, such as Noctiluca scintillans (sea sparkles) and the genus Pyrocystis, exhibit bioluminescence via luciferin catalyzed by luciferase, just like fireflies. Their glow is believed to have a startle effect stunning predators, with a secondary benefit of the burglar-alarm hypothesis where the flashes attract higher-order predators that prey on algae grazers.

On the basis of their habitat, algae can be categorized as: aquatic (planktonic, benthic, marine, freshwater, lentic, lotic), terrestrial, aerial (subaerial), lithophytic, halophytic (or euryhaline), psammon, thermophilic, cryophilic, epibiont (epiphytic, epizoic), endosymbiont (endophytic, endozoic), parasitic, calcifilic or lichenic (phycobiont).

=== Symbiotic algae ===
Some species of algae form symbiotic relationships with other organisms. In these symbioses, the algae supply photosynthates (organic substances) to the host organism providing protection to the algal cells. The host organism derives some or all of its energy requirements from the algae. Examples are:

==== Lichens ====
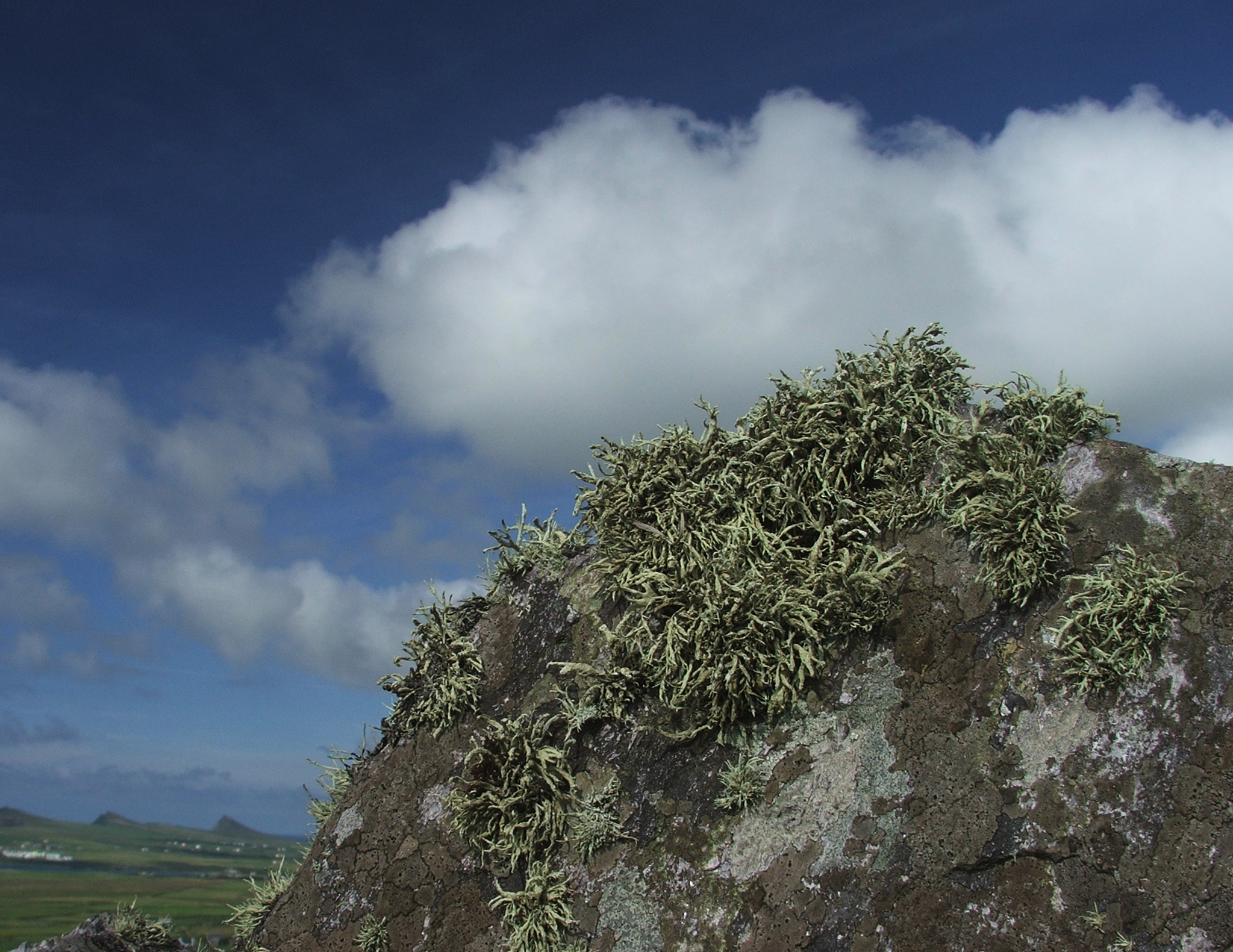
Rock lichens in Ireland

Lichens are defined by the International Association for Lichenology to be "an association of a fungus and a photosynthetic symbiont resulting in a stable vegetative body having a specific structure". The fungi, or mycobionts, are mainly from the Ascomycota with a few from the Basidiomycota. In nature, they do not occur separate from lichens. It is unknown when they began to associate. One or more mycobiont associates with the same phycobiont species, from the green algae, except that alternatively, the mycobiont may associate with a species of cyanobacteria (hence "photobiont" is the more accurate term). A photobiont may be associated with many different mycobionts or may live independently; accordingly, lichens are named and classified as fungal species. The association is termed a morphogenesis because the lichen has a form and capabilities not possessed by the symbiont species alone (they can be experimentally isolated). The photobiont possibly triggers otherwise latent genes in the mycobiont.

Trentepohlia is an example of a common green alga genus worldwide that can grow on its own or be lichenised. Lichen thus share some of the habitat and often similar appearance with specialized species of algae (aerophytes) growing on exposed surfaces such as tree trunks and rocks and sometimes discoloring them.

==== Animal symbioses ====
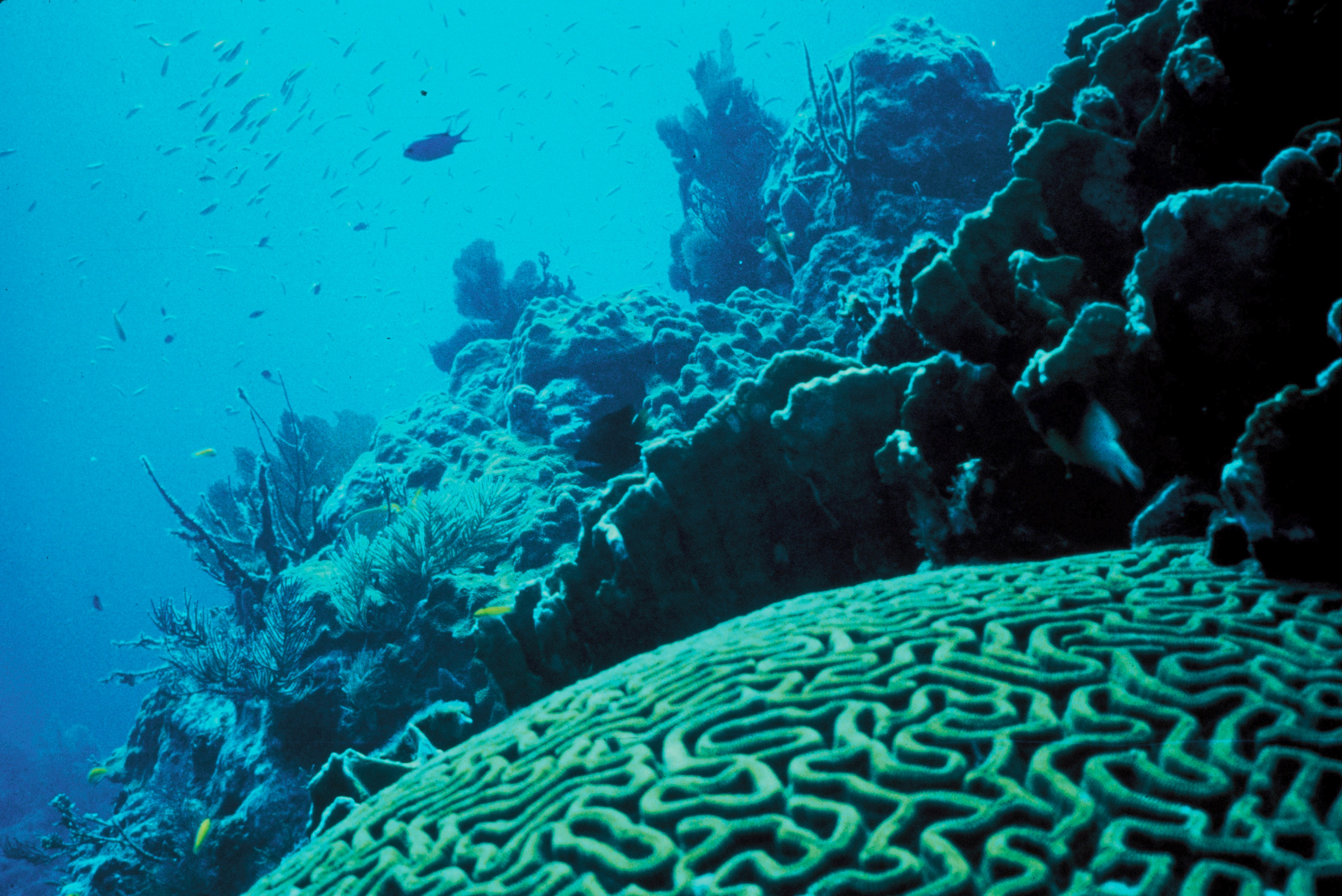
Floridian coral reef

Coral reefs are accumulated from the calcareous exoskeletons of marine invertebrates of the order Scleractinia (stony corals). These animals metabolize sugar and oxygen to obtain energy for their cell-building processes, including secretion of the exoskeleton, with water and carbon dioxide as byproducts. Dinoflagellates (algal protists) are often endosymbionts in the cells of the coral-forming marine invertebrates, where they accelerate host-cell metabolism by generating sugar and oxygen immediately available through photosynthesis using incident light and the carbon dioxide produced by the host. Reef-building stony corals (hermatypic corals) require endosymbiotic algae from the genus Symbiodinium to be in a healthy condition. The loss of Symbiodinium from the host is known as coral bleaching, a condition which leads to the deterioration of a reef.

Endosymbiontic green algae live close to the surface of some sponges, for example, breadcrumb sponges (Halichondria panicea). The alga is thus protected from predators; the sponge is provided with oxygen and sugars which can account for 50 to 80% of sponge growth in some species.

== Evolutionary history ==
=== Origin of oxygenic photosynthesis ===
Prokaryotic algae, i.e., cyanobacteria, are the only group of organisms where oxygenic photosynthesis has evolved. The oldest undisputed fossil evidence of cyanobacteria is dated at 2100 million years ago, although stromatolites, associated with cyanobacterial biofilms, appear as early as 3500 million years ago in the fossil record.

=== First endosymbiosis ===
Eukaryotic algae are polyphyletic thus their origin cannot be traced back to a single hypothetical common ancestor. It is thought that they came into existence when photosynthetic coccoid cyanobacteria got phagocytized by a unicellular heterotrophic eukaryote (a protist), giving rise to double-membranous primary plastids. Such symbiogenic events (primary symbiogenesis) are believed to have occurred more than 1.5 billion years ago during the Calymmian period, early in Boring Billion, but it is difficult to track the key events because of so much time gap. Primary symbiogenesis gave rise to three divisions of archaeplastids, namely the Viridiplantae (green algae and later plants), Rhodophyta (red algae) and Glaucophyta ("grey algae"), whose plastids further spread into other protist lineages through eukaryote-eukaryote predation, engulfments and subsequent endosymbioses (secondary and tertiary symbiogenesis). This process of serial cell "capture" and "enslavement" explains the diversity of photosynthetic eukaryotes. The oldest undisputed fossil evidence of eukaryotic algae is Bangiomorpha pubescens, a red alga found in rocks around 1047 million years old.

=== Consecutive endosymbioses ===
Plastid acquisitions across eukaryotes, shown in discontinuous arrows: blue for the primary plastids derived directly from a cyanobacterium, and red and green for the secondary plastids derived from red algae and green algae, respectively. Red arrows are placed according to the 2024 hypothesis; disagreements with previous hypotheses are marked '?'.

Recent genomic and phylogenomic approaches have significantly clarified plastid genome evolution, the horizontal movement of endosymbiont genes to the "host" nuclear genome, and plastid spread throughout the eukaryotic tree of life. It is accepted that both euglenophytes and chlorarachniophytes obtained their chloroplasts from chlorophytes that became endosymbionts. In particular, euglenophyte chloroplasts share the most resemblance with the genus Pyramimonas.

However, there is still no clear order in which the secondary and tertiary endosymbioses occurred for the "chromist" lineages (ochrophytes, cryptophytes, haptophytes and myzozoans). Two main models have been proposed to explain the order, both of which agree that cryptophytes obtained their chloroplasts from red algae. One model, hypothesized in 2014 by John W. Stiller and coauthors, suggests that a cryptophyte became the plastid of ochrophytes, which in turn became the plastid of myzozoans and haptophytes. The other model, suggested by Andrzej Bodył and coauthors in 2009, describes that a cryptophyte became the plastid of both haptophytes and ochrophytes, and it is a haptophyte that became the plastid of myzozoans instead. In 2024, a third model by Filip Pietluch and coauthors proposed that there were two independent endosymbioses with red algae: one that originated the cryptophyte plastids (as in the previous models), and subsequently the haptophyte plastids; and another that originated the ochrophyte plastids, where the myzozoans obtained theirs.

=== Relationship to land plants ===
Fossils of isolated spores suggest land plants may have been around as long as 475 million years ago (mya) during the Late Cambrian/Early Ordovician period, from sessile shallow freshwater charophyte algae much like Chara, which likely got stranded ashore when riverine/lacustrine water levels dropped during dry seasons. These charophyte algae probably already developed filamentous thalli and holdfasts that superficially resembled plant stems and roots, and probably had an isomorphic alternation of generations. They perhaps evolved some 850 mya and might even be as early as 1 Gya during the late phase of the Boring Billion.

== Cultivation ==
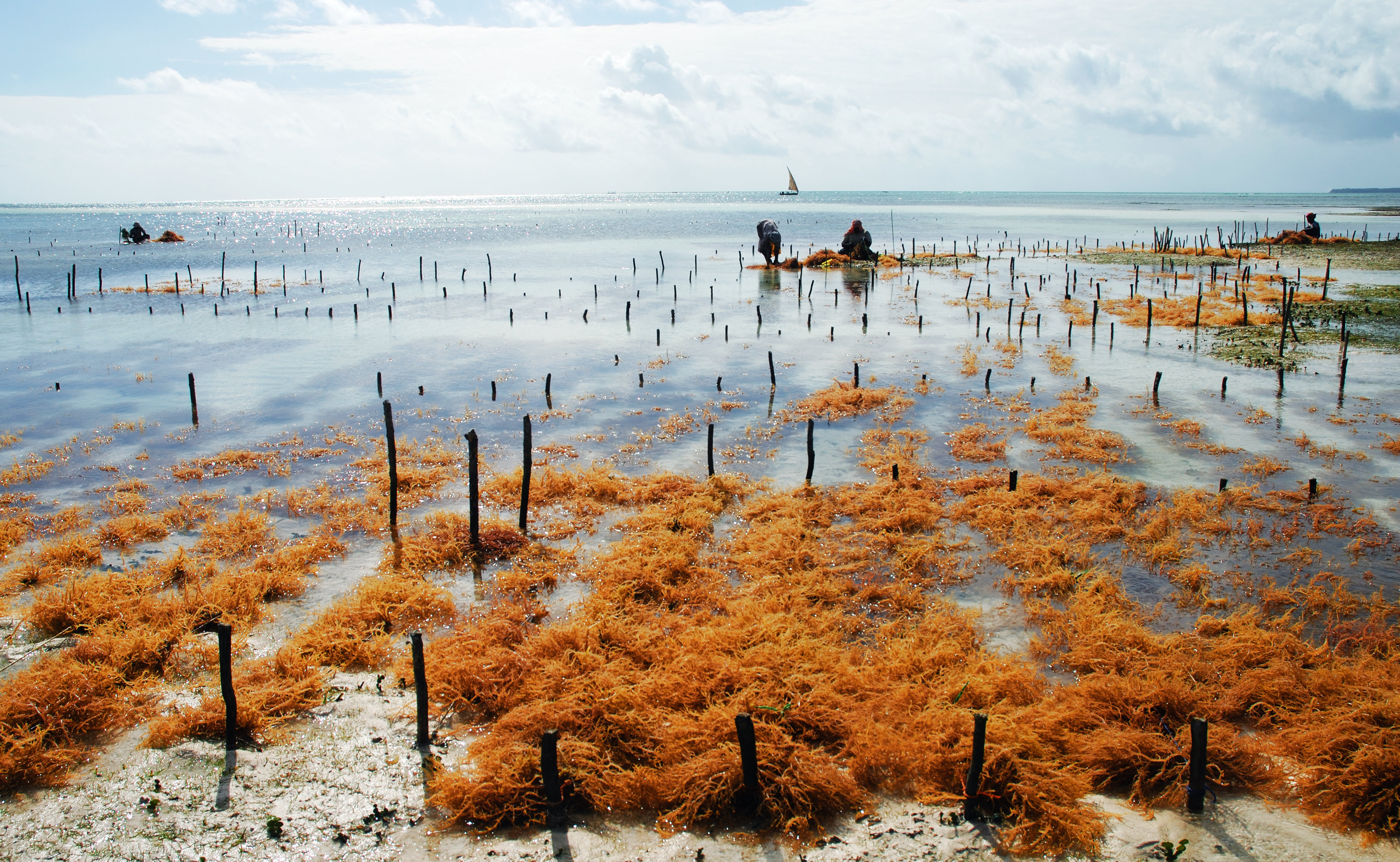
A seaweed farm in Uroa, Zanzibar

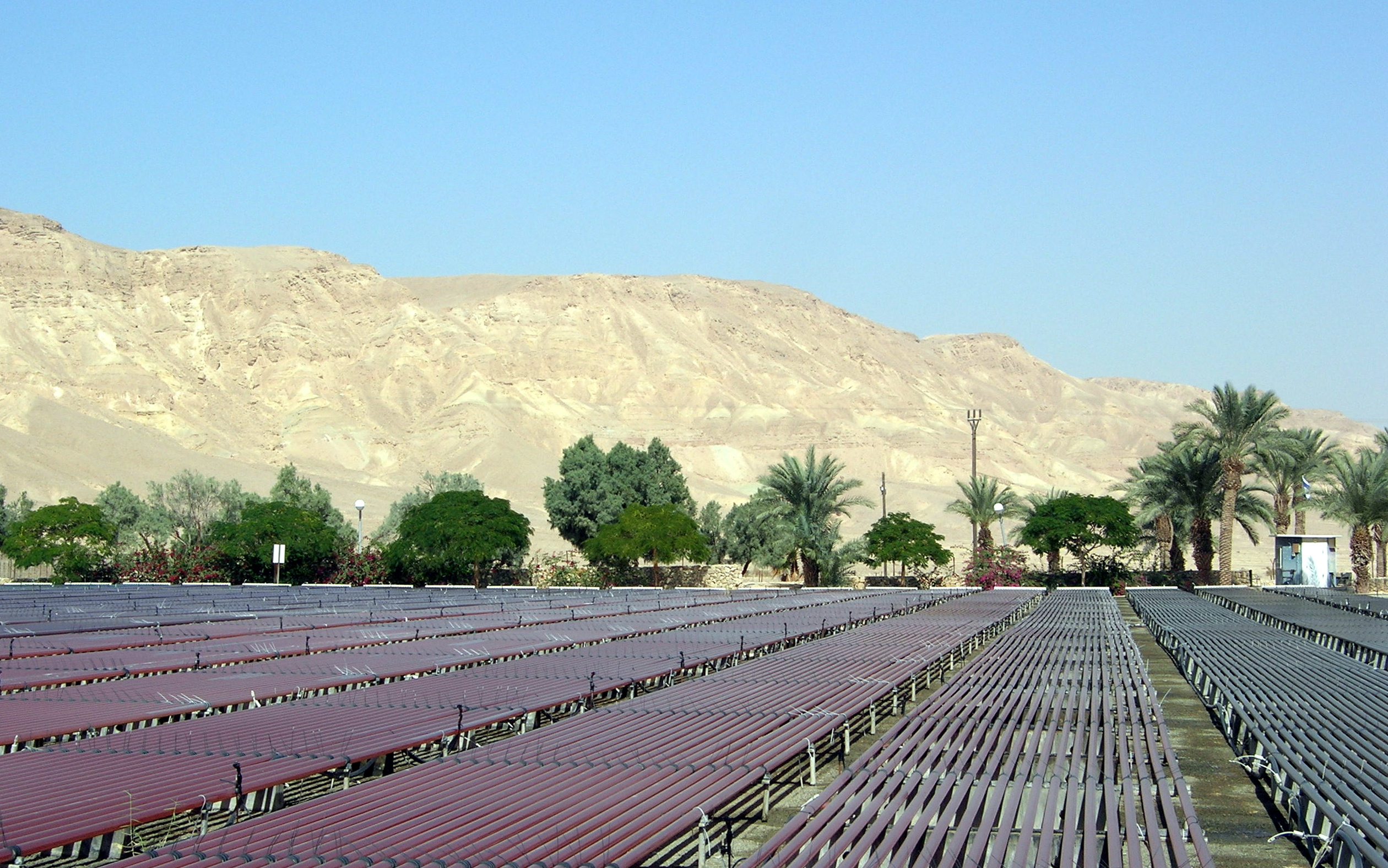
Algaculture in Kibbutz Ketura, Israel

Algaculture is a form of aquaculture involving the farming of species of algae.

The majority of algae that are intentionally cultivated fall into the category of microalgae (also referred to as phytoplankton, microphytes, or planktonic algae). Macroalgae, commonly known as seaweed, also have many commercial and industrial uses, but due to their size and the specific requirements of the environment in which they need to grow, they do not lend themselves as readily to cultivation (this may change, however, with the advent of newer seaweed cultivators, which are basically algae scrubbers using upflowing air bubbles in small containers, known as tumble culture).

Commercial and industrial algae cultivation has numerous uses, including production of nutraceuticals such as omega-3 fatty acids (as algal oil) or natural food colorants and dyes, food, fertilizers, bioplastics, chemical feedstock (raw material), protein-rich animal/aquaculture feed, pharmaceuticals, and algal fuel, and can also be used as a means of pollution control and natural carbon sequestration.

Global production of farmed aquatic plants, overwhelmingly dominated by seaweeds, grew in output volume from 13.5 million tonnes in 1995, to just over 30 million tonnes in 2016 and 37.8 million tonnes in 2022 and 40 million tonnes in 2024. This increase was the result of production expansions led by China, followed by Malaysia, the Philippines, the United Republic of Tanzania, and the Russian Federation.

Cultured microalgae already contribute to a wide range of sectors in the emerging bioeconomy. Research suggests there are large potentials and benefits of algaculture for the development of a future healthy and sustainable food system.

=== Seaweed farming ===
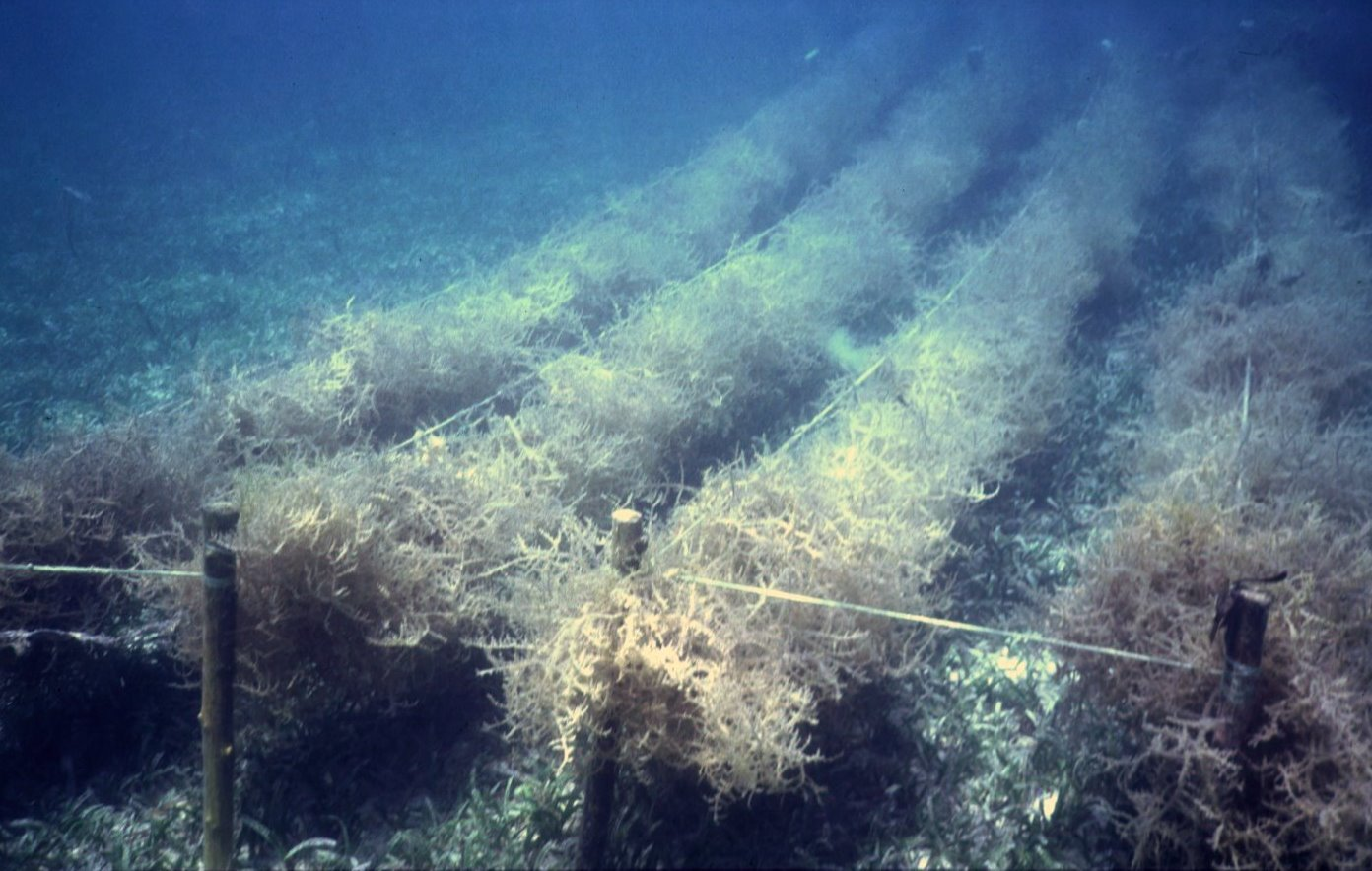
Underwater Eucheuma farming in the Philippines

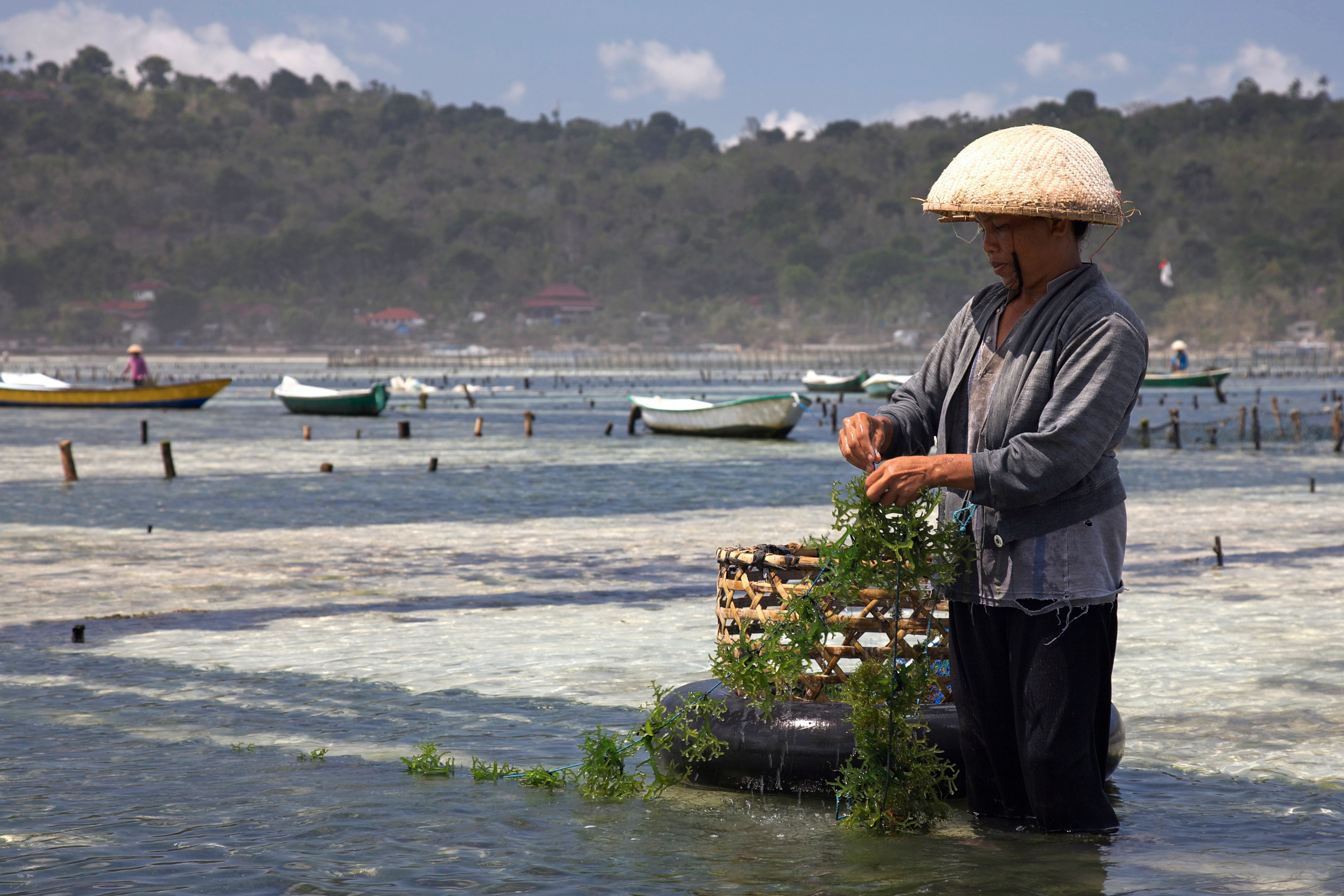
A seaweed farmer in Nusa Lembongan (Indonesia) gathers edible seaweed that has grown on a rope.

Seaweed farming or kelp farming is the practice of cultivating and harvesting seaweed. In its simplest form farmers gather from natural beds, while at the other extreme farmers fully control the crop's life cycle.

The seven most cultivated taxa are Eucheuma spp., Kappaphycus alvarezii, Gracilaria spp., Saccharina japonica, Undaria pinnatifida, Pyropia spp., and Sargassum fusiforme. Eucheuma and K. alvarezii are attractive for carrageenan (a gelling agent); Gracilaria is farmed for agar; the rest are eaten after limited processing. Seaweeds are different from mangroves and seagrasses, as they are photosynthetic algal organisms and are non-flowering.

The largest seaweed-producing countries as of 2022 are China (58.62%) and Indonesia (28.6%); followed by South Korea (5.09%) and the Philippines (4.19%). Other notable producers include North Korea (1.6%), Japan (1.15%), Malaysia (0.53%), Zanzibar (Tanzania, 0.5%), and Chile (0.3%). Seaweed farming has frequently been developed to improve economic conditions and to reduce fishing pressure.

The Food and Agriculture Organization (FAO) reported that world production in 2019 was over 35 million tonnes. North America produced some 23,000 tonnes of wet seaweed. Alaska, Maine, France, and Norway each more than doubled their seaweed production since 2018. As of 2019, seaweed represented 30% of marine aquaculture. In 2023, the global seaweed extract market was valued at $16.5 billion, with strong projected growth.

Seaweed farming is a carbon negative crop, with a high potential for climate change mitigation. The IPCC Special Report on the Ocean and Cryosphere in a Changing Climate recommends "further research attention" as a mitigation tactic. World Wildlife Fund, Oceans 2050, and The Nature Conservancy publicly support expanded seaweed cultivation.

=== Bioreactors ===
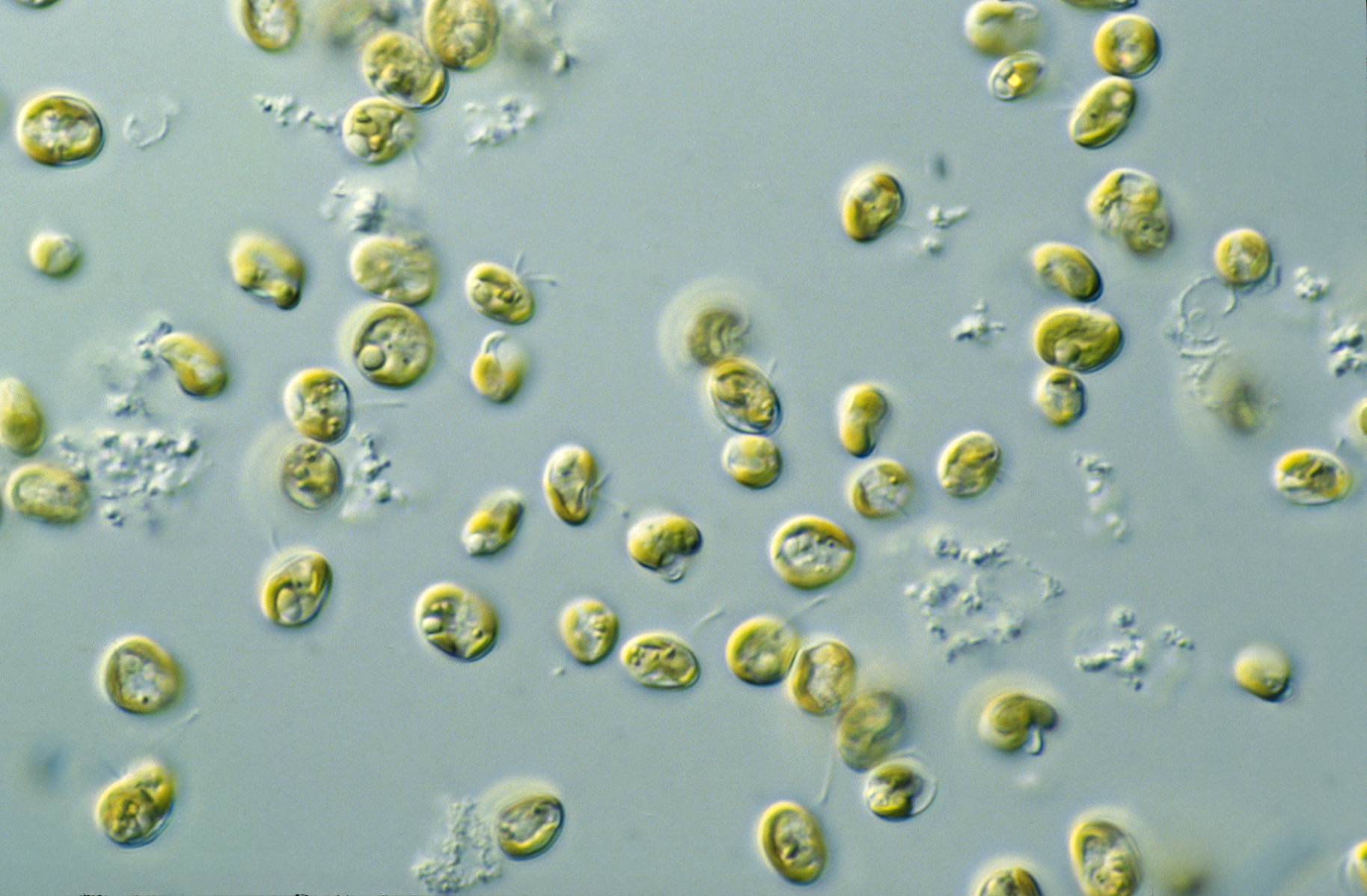
A close up of microalgae – Pavlova sp.

An algae bioreactor is used for cultivating micro or macroalgae. Algae may be cultivated for the purposes of biomass production (as in a seaweed cultivator), wastewater treatment, CO_{2} fixation, or aquarium/pond filtration in the form of an algae scrubber. Algae bioreactors vary widely in design, falling broadly into two categories: open reactors and enclosed reactors. Open reactors are exposed to the atmosphere while enclosed reactors, also commonly called photobioreactors, are isolated to varying extents from the atmosphere. Specifically, algae bioreactors can be used to produce fuels such as biodiesel and bioethanol, to generate animal feed, or to reduce pollutants such as NO_{x} and CO_{2} in flue gases of power plants. Fundamentally, this kind of bioreactor is based on the photosynthetic reaction, which is performed by the chlorophyll-containing algae itself using dissolved carbon dioxide and sunlight. The carbon dioxide is dispersed into the reactor fluid to make it accessible to the algae. The bioreactor has to be made out of transparent material.

== Uses ==
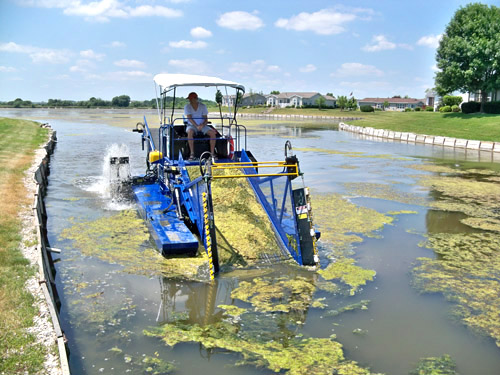
Harvesting algae

=== Biofuel ===
To be competitive and independent from fluctuating support from (local) policy on the long run, biofuels should equal or beat the cost level of fossil fuels. Here, algae-based fuels hold great promise, directly related to the potential to produce more biomass per unit area in a year than any other form of biomass. The break-even point for algae-based biofuels is estimated to occur by 2025.

=== Fertilizer ===
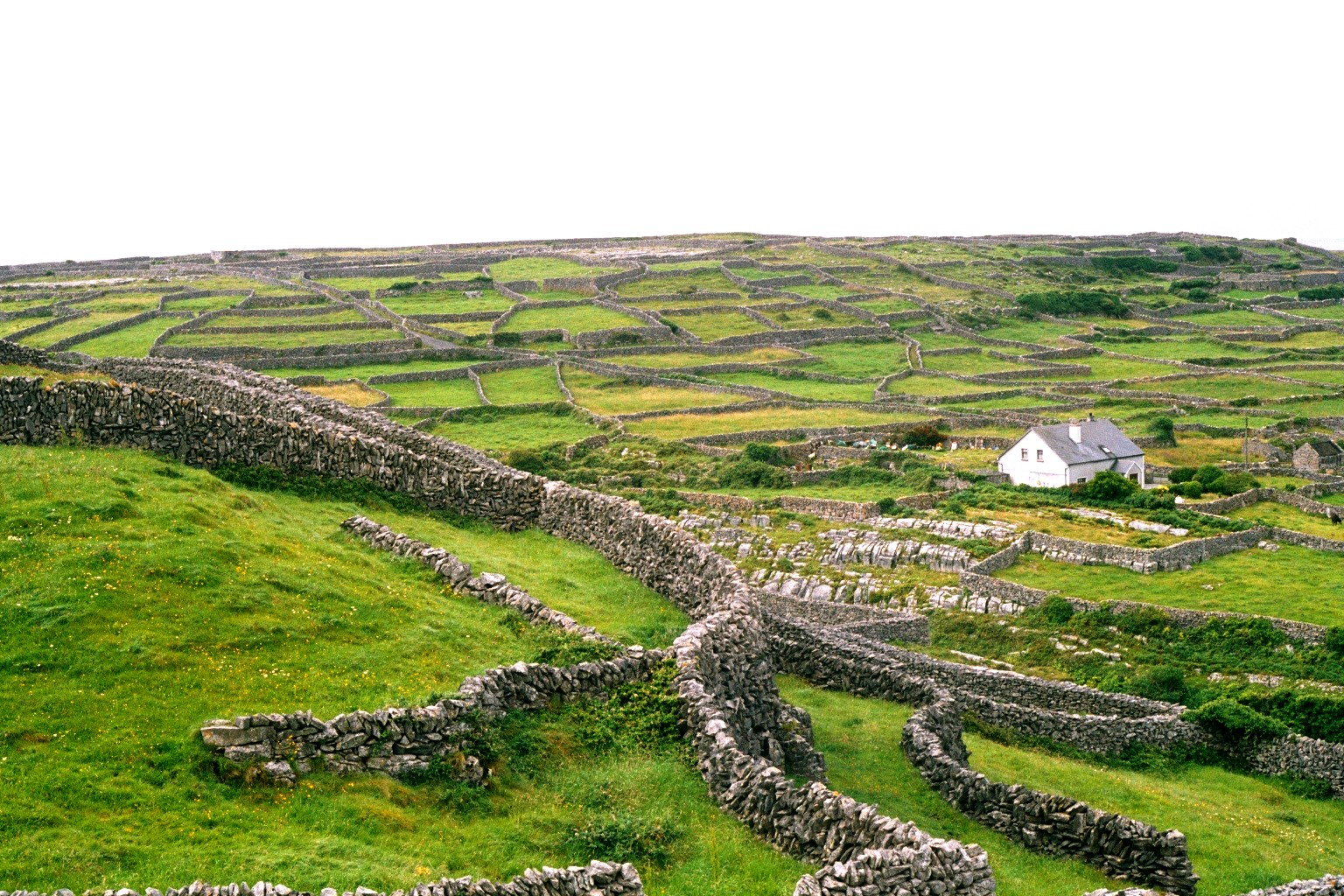
Seaweed-fertilized gardens on Inisheer

For centuries, seaweed has been used as a fertilizer; George Owen of Henllys writing in the 16th century referring to drift weed in South Wales:

This kind of ore they often gather and lay on great heapes, where it heteth and rotteth, and will have a strong and loathsome smell; when being so rotten they cast on the land, as they do their muck, and thereof springeth good corn, especially barley ... After spring-tydes or great rigs of the sea, they fetch it in sacks on horse backes, and carie the same three, four, or five miles, and cast it on the lande, which doth very much better the ground for corn and grass.

Today, algae are used by humans in many ways; for example, as fertilizers, soil conditioners, and livestock feed. Aquatic and microscopic species are cultured in clear tanks or ponds and are either harvested or used to treat effluents pumped through the ponds. Algaculture on a large scale is an important type of aquaculture in some places. Maerl is commonly used as a soil conditioner.

=== Food industry ===
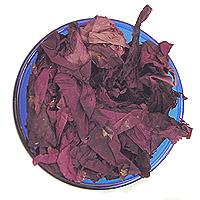
Dulse, a type of edible seaweed

Algae are used as foods in many countries: China consumes more than 70 species, including fat choy, a cyanobacterium considered a vegetable; Japan, over 20 species such as nori and aonori; Ireland, dulse; Chile, cochayuyo. Laver is used to make laverbread in Wales, where it is known as bara lawr. In Korea, green laver is used to make gim.

Some of the most commonly used microalgae as food are:

- Chlorella: This form of alga is found in freshwater and contains photosynthetic pigments in its chloroplasts.
- Klamath AFA: A subspecies of Aphanizomenon flos-aquae found wild in many bodies of water worldwide but harvested only from Upper Klamath Lake, Oregon.
- Spirulina: Known otherwise as a cyanobacterium (a prokaryote or a "blue-green alga")

The oils from some algae have high levels of unsaturated fatty acids. Some varieties of algae favored by vegetarianism and veganism contain the long-chain, essential omega-3 fatty acids, docosahexaenoic acid (DHA) and eicosapentaenoic acid (EPA). Fish oil contains the omega-3 fatty acids, but the original source is algae (microalgae in particular), which are eaten by marine life such as copepods and are passed up the food chain.

The natural pigments (carotenoids and chlorophylls) produced by algae can be used as alternatives to chemical dyes and coloring agents. The presence of some individual algal pigments, together with specific pigment concentration ratios, are taxon-specific: analysis of their concentrations with various analytical methods, particularly high-performance liquid chromatography, can therefore offer deep insight into the taxonomic composition and relative abundance of natural algae populations in sea water samples.

Carrageenan, from the red alga Chondrus crispus, is used as a thickener and stabilizer in milk products.

=== Gelling agents ===
Agar, a gelatinous substance derived from red algae, has a number of commercial uses. It is a good medium on which to grow bacteria and fungi, as most microorganisms cannot digest agar.

Alginic acid, or alginate, is extracted from brown algae. Its uses range from gelling agents in food, to medical dressings. Alginic acid also has been used in the field of biotechnology as a biocompatible medium for cell encapsulation and cell immobilization. Molecular cuisine is also a user of the substance for its gelling properties, by which it becomes a delivery vehicle for flavours.

=== Pollution control and bioremediation ===
- Sewage can be treated with algae, reducing the use of large amounts of toxic chemicals that would otherwise be needed.
- Algae can be used to capture fertilizers in runoff from farms. When subsequently harvested, the enriched algae can be used as fertilizer.
- Aquaria and ponds can be filtered using algae, which absorb nutrients from the water in a device called an algae scrubber, also known as an algae turf scrubber.

Agricultural Research Service scientists found that 60–90% of nitrogen runoff and 70–100% of phosphorus runoff can be captured from manure effluents using a horizontal algae scrubber, also called an algal turf scrubber (ATS). Scientists developed the ATS, which consists of shallow, 30-metre (100 ft) raceways of nylon netting where algae colonies can form, and studied its efficacy for three years. They found that algae can readily be used to reduce the nutrient runoff from agricultural fields and increase the quality of water flowing into rivers, streams, and oceans. Researchers collected and dried the nutrient-rich algae from the ATS and studied its potential as an organic fertilizer. They found that cucumber and corn seedlings grew just as well using ATS organic fertilizer as they did with commercial fertilizers. Algae scrubbers, using bubbling upflow or vertical waterfall versions, are now also being used to filter aquaria and ponds.

The alga Stichococcus bacillaris has been seen to colonize silicone resins used at archaeological sites; biodegrading the synthetic substance.

=== Bioplastics ===
Various polymers can be created from algae, which can be especially useful in the creation of bioplastics. These include hybrid plastics, cellulose-based plastics, poly-lactic acid, and bio-polyethylene. Several companies have begun to produce algae polymers commercially, including for use in flip-flops and in surf boards. Even algae is also used to prepare various polymeric resins suitable for coating applications.

== In human culture ==
The third island on Kunming Lake at Beijing's Summer Palace is called Zaojian Tang Dao (藻鑒堂島). The name comes from the classical Chinese character 藻, meaning both "algae" and "literary talent." As a result the islands name can be translated to either "Island of the Algae-Viewing Hall" or "Island of the Hall for Reflecting on Literary Talent."

== Additional images ==
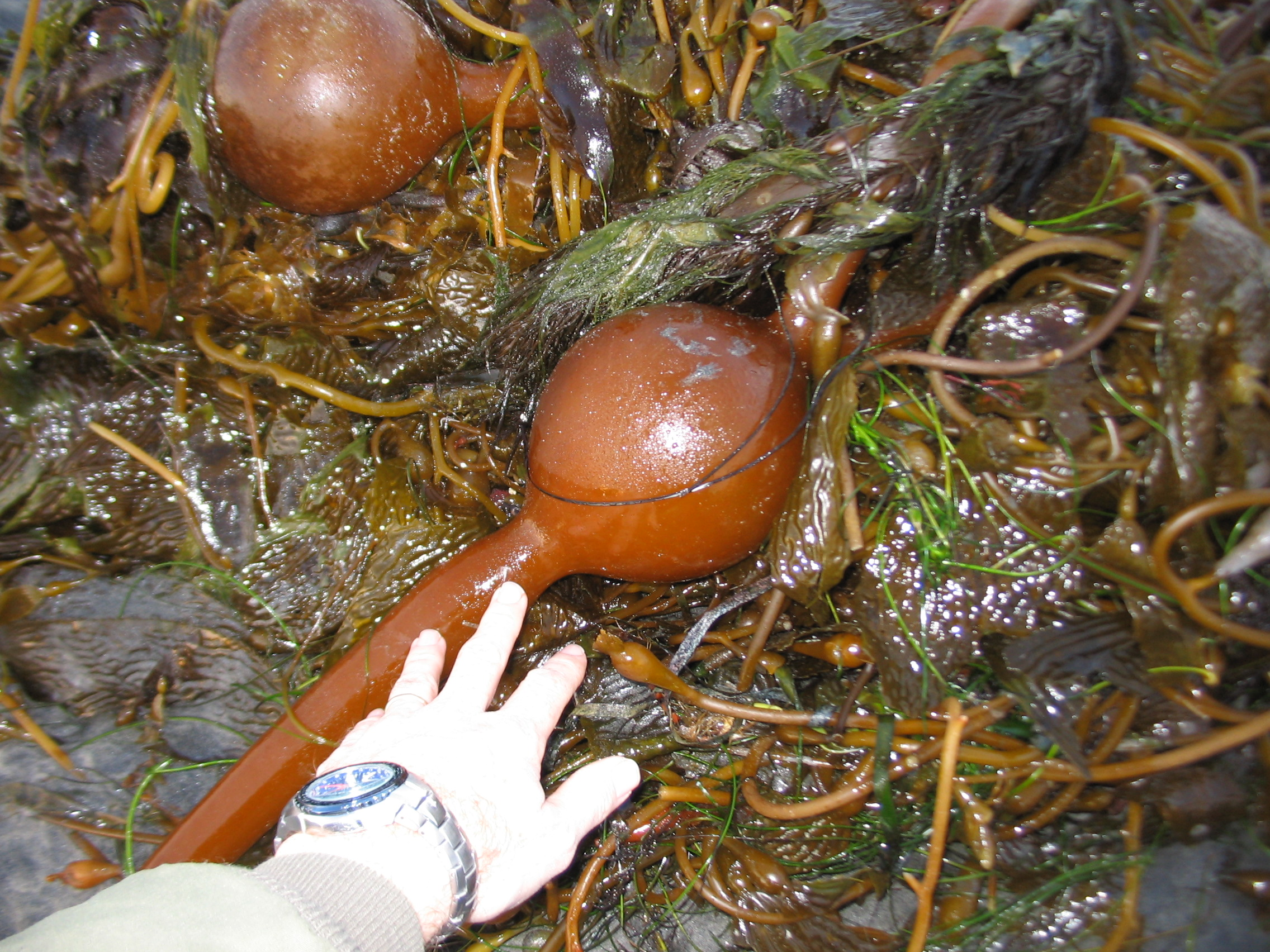
Algae bladder

== See also ==
- AlgaeBase
- AlgaePARC
- Algaculture
- Eutrophication
- Iron fertilization
- Marimo algae
- Microbiofuels
- Microphyte
- Photobioreactor
- Phycotechnology
- Plants
- Toxoid – anatoxin

== Bibliography ==
=== General ===
- Chapman, V.J. (1980) [1st Pub. 1950]. Seaweeds and their Uses. London: Methuen. ISBN 978-0-412-15740-0.
- Fritsch, F. E. (1945) [1935]. The Structure and Reproduction of the Algae. Vol. I & II. Cambridge University Press.
- van den Hoek, C.; Mann, D. G.; Jahns, H. M. (1995). Algae: An Introduction to Phycology. Cambridge University Press.
- Kassinger, Ruth (2020). Slime: How Algae Created Us, Plague Us, and Just Might Save Us. Mariner.
- Lembi, C. A.; Waaland, J.R. (1988). Algae and Human Affairs. Cambridge University Press. ISBN 978-0-521-32115-0.
- Mumford, T. F.; Miura, A. (1988). "Porphyra as food: cultivation and economic". In Lembi, C. A.; Waaland, J. R. (eds.). Algae and Human Affairs. Cambridge University Press. pp. 87–117. ISBN 978-0-521-32115-0..
- Round, F. E. (1981). The Ecology of Algae. London: Cambridge University Press. ISBN 978-0-521-22583-0.
- Smith, G. M. (1938). Cryptogamic Botany. Vol. I. New York: McGraw-Hill.
- Ask, E.I (1990). Cottonii and Spinosum Cultivation Handbook. FMC BioPolymer Corporation.Philippines.

=== Regional ===
==== Britain and Ireland ====
- Brodie, Juliet; Burrows, Elsie M.; Chamberlain, Yvonne M.; Christensen, Tyge; Dixon, Peter Stanley; Fletcher, R. L.; Hommersand, Max H.; Irvine, Linda M.; Maggs, Christine A. (1977–2003). Seaweeds of the British Isles: A Collaborative Project of the British Phycological Society and the British Museum (Natural History). London / Andover: British Museum of Natural History, HMSO / Intercept. ISBN 978-0-565-00781-2.
- Cullinane, John P. (1973). Phycology of the South Coast of Ireland. Cork: Cork University Press.
- Hardy, F. G.; Aspinall, R. J. (1988). An Atlas of the Seaweeds of Northumberland and Durham. The Hancock Museum, University Newcastle upon Tyne: Northumberland Biological Records Centre. ISBN 978-0-9509680-5-6.
- Hardy, F. G.; Guiry, Michael D.; Arnold, Henry R. (2006). A Check-list and Atlas of the Seaweeds of Britain and Ireland (Revised ed.). London: British Phycological Society. ISBN 978-3-906166-35-3.
- John, D. M.; Whitton, B. A.; Brook, J. A. (2002). The Freshwater Algal Flora of the British Isles. Cambridge / New York: Cambridge University Press. ISBN 978-0-521-77051-4.
- Knight, Margery; Parke, Mary W. (1931). Manx Algae: An Algal Survey of the South End of the Isle of Man. Liverpool Marine Biology Committee Memoirs on Typical British Marine Plants & Animals. Vol. XXX. Liverpool: University Press.
- Morton, Osborne (1994). Marine Algae of Northern Ireland. Belfast: Ulster Museum. ISBN 978-0-900761-28-7.
- Morton, Osborne (1 December 2003). "The Marine Macroalgae of County Donegal, Ireland". Bulletin of the Irish Biogeographical Society. 27: 3–164.

==== Australia ====
- Huisman, J. M. (2000). Marine Plants of Australia. University of Western Australia Press. ISBN 978-1-876268-33-6.

==== New Zealand ====
- Chapman, Valentine Jackson; Lindauer, VW; Aiken, M.; Dromgoole, F. I. (1970) [1900, 1956, 1961, 1969]. The Marine algae of New Zealand. London / Lehre, Germany: Linnean Society of London / Cramer.

==== Europe ====
- Cabioc'h, Jacqueline; Floc'h, Jean-Yves; Le Toquin, Alain; Boudouresque, Charles-François; Meinesz, Alexandre; Verlaque, Marc (1992). Guide des algues des mers d'Europe: Manche/Atlantique-Méditerranée (in French). Lausanne, Suisse: Delachaux et Niestlé. ISBN 978-2-603-00848-5.
- Gayral, Paulette (1966). Les Algues de côtes françaises (manche et atlantique), notions fondamentales sur l'écologie, la biologie et la systématique des algues marines (in French). Paris: Doin, Deren et Cie.
- Guiry, Michael. D.; Blunden, G. (1991). Seaweed Resources in Europe: Uses and Potential. John Wiley & Sons. ISBN 978-0-471-92947-5.
- Míguez Rodríguez, Luís (1998). Algas mariñas de Galicia: Bioloxía, gastronomía, industria (in Galician). Vigo: Edicións Xerais de Galicia. ISBN 978-84-8302-263-4.
- Otero, J. (2002). Guía das macroalgas de Galicia (in Galician). A Coruña: Baía Edicións. ISBN 978-84-89803-22-0.
- Bárbara, I.; Cremades, J. (1993). Guía de las algas del litoral gallego (in Spanish). A Coruña: Concello da Coruña – Casa das Ciencias.

==== Arctic ====
- Kjellman, Frans Reinhold (1883). The algae of the Arctic Sea: A survey of the species, together with an exposition of the general characters and the development of the flora. Vol. 20. Stockholm: Kungl. Svenska vetenskapsakademiens handlingar. pp. 1–350.

==== Greenland ====
- Lund, Søren Jensen (1959). The Marine Algae of East Greenland. Kövenhavn: C.A. Reitzel. 9584734.

==== Faroe Islands ====
- Børgesen, Frederik (1970) [1903]. "Marine Algae". In Warming, Eugene (ed.). Botany of the Faröes Based Upon Danish Investigations, Part II. Copenhagen: Det nordiske Forlag. pp. 339–532..

==== Canary Islands ====
- Børgesen, Frederik (1936) [1925, 1926, 1927, 1929, 1930]. Marine Algae from the Canary Islands. Copenhagen: Bianco Lunos.

==== Morocco ====
- Gayral, Paulette (1958). Algues de la côte atlantique marocaine (in French). Casablanca: Rabat [Société des sciences naturelles et physiques du Maroc].

==== South Africa ====
- Stegenga, H.; Bolton, J. J.; Anderson, R. J. (1997). Seaweeds of the South African West Coast. Bolus Herbarium, University of Cape Town. ISBN 978-0-7992-1793-3.

==== North America ====
- Abbott, I. A.; Hollenberg, G. J. (1976). Marine Algae of California. California: Stanford University Press. ISBN 978-0-8047-0867-8.
- Greeson, Phillip E. (1982). An annotated key to the identification of commonly occurring and dominant genera of Algae observed in the Phytoplankton of the United States. Washington DC: US Department of the Interior, Geological Survey.
- Taylor, William Randolph (1969) [1937, 1957, 1962]. Marine Algae of the Northeastern Coast of North America. Ann Arbor: University of Michigan Press. ISBN 978-0-472-04904-2.
- Wehr, J. D.; Sheath, R. G. (2003). Freshwater Algae of North America: Ecology and Classification. Academic Press. ISBN 978-0-12-741550-5.
