= Lobocharacium =

Scientific classification
- Clade: Viridiplantae
- Division: Chlorophyta
- Class: Chlorophyceae
- Order: Chlamydomonadales
- Family: Characiosiphonaceae
- Genus: Lobocharacium; Kugrens, Clay & Aguiar
- Species: L. coloradoense

Binomial name
- Lobocharacium coloradoense Kugrens, Clay & Aguiar, 2000

Genus of algae

Lobocharacium is a genus of green algae in the family Characiosiphonaceae. It contains the single species Lobocharacium coloradoense. It has been isolated from a pond in Colorado, United States.

== Description ==
Lobocharacium coloradoense consists of individual, spindle-shaped cells that are 120–230 μm long and 50–120 μm in diameter, attached to a substrate via a small pad. Cells are multinucleate, with multiple nuclei. Surrounding each nucleus is a cone-shaped chloroplast which is stellate viewed from the front, each with a central pyrenoid. Nuclei and chloroplasts are each in their own lobe or compartment of the cytoplasm, the lobes connected by thin bridges. Contractile vacuoles are absent.

Lobocharacium reproduces asexually and sexually. Asexual reproduction occurs by zoospores, which have two flagella, a stigma and a parietal with a pyrenoid. Alternatively, aplanospores may also be formed. Sexual reproduction is isogamous, with spherical gametes with two flagella. The zoospores and gametes are released when the entire cell wall dissolves.

Lobocharacium is most closely related to the genus Characiosiphon, and shares many morphological characters, including the multinucleate cells with many stellate chloroplasts. The latter genus produces larger cells (up to 0.5 cm), with a large central vacuole and many smaller contractile vacuoles. Additionally, the zoospores and gametes in Characiosiphon are released through a pore in the cell wall.
