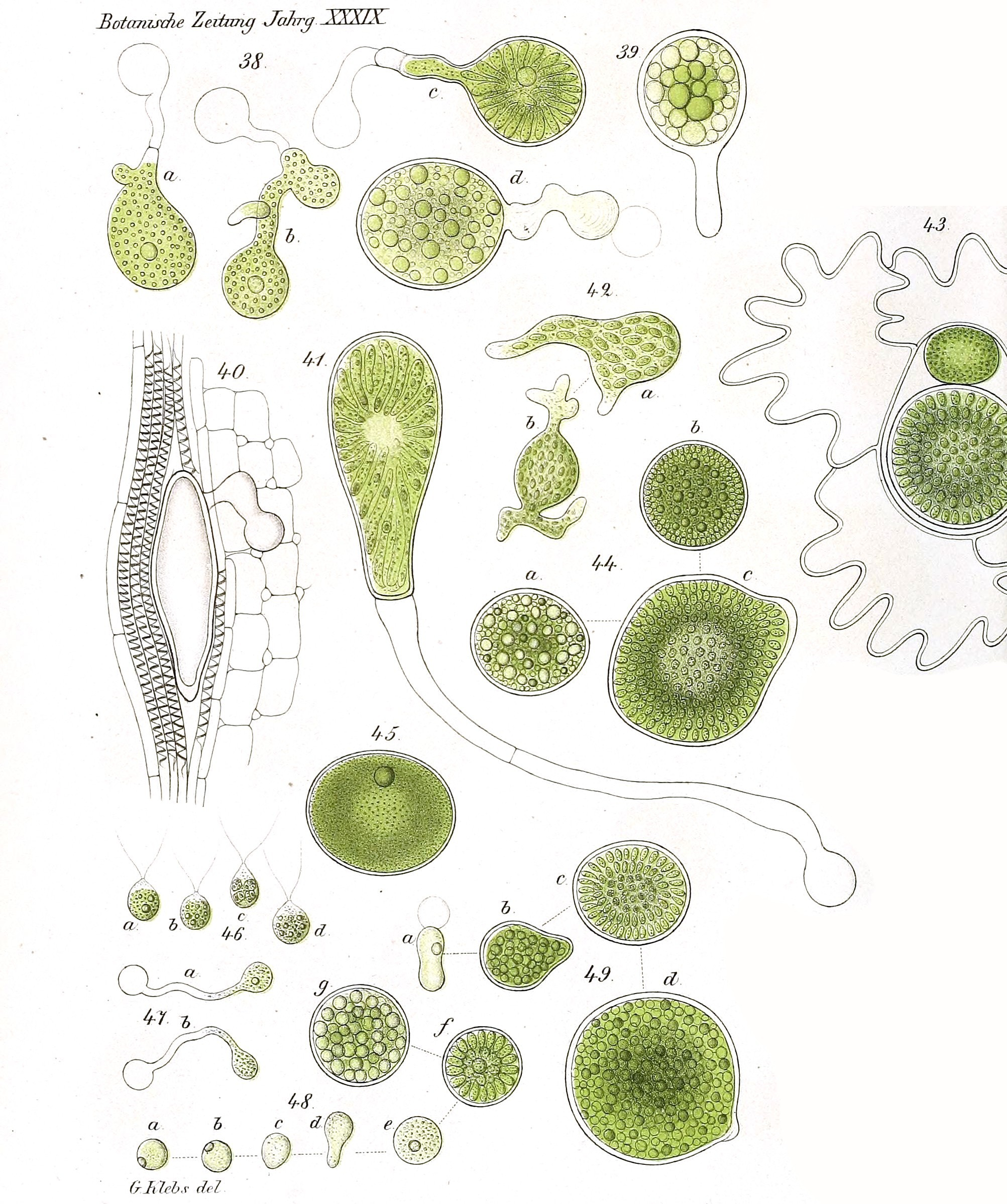

Scientific classification
- Kingdom: Plantae
- Division: Chlorophyta
- Class: Chlorophyceae
- Order: Chlamydomonadales
- Family: Chlorochytriaceae
- Genus: Phyllobium; Klebs, 1881

Type species
- Phyllobium dimorphum Klebs, 1881

Species
- Phyllobium dimorphum

= Phyllobium =

Genus of algae

Phyllobium is a genus of green algae, in the family Chlorochytriaceae.
