= Phycotechnology =

Technological applications of algae

Phycotechnology (Greek Phyco meaning alga and technology) refers to the technological applications of algae, both microalgae and macroalgae. This field deals with the utilization of physical, chemical and biological characteristics of algae to develop useful produts and solutions.

== Uses ==
=== Sewage reclamation ===
Currently micro-algae are being exploited for environmental protection as the species of Chlorella, Chlamydomonas, and Scenedesmus carry out selective uptake, accumulation and biodegradation of pollutants and thus help in remediation. They are used in biological reclamation of sewage since they can immobilize heavy metals from aquatic systems.

=== Insecticide ===
Microalgae can be used as biocontrol agents like 'Insect' a commercial bio-insecticide sold in USA, prepared from the dead biomass of diatom frustules.

=== Nanofilter ===
One of the notable applications of algae in recent years is the development of nanofilter for water purification. The green microalga Pithophora is used as a source of nanocellulose for the production of a highly porous nanofibrous structure with pore size of approximately 17 nm and is capable of efficiently removing microorganisms such as viruses, bacteria, and suspended particles through size-exclusion mechanism, resulting in complete pathogen-free real water samples. Such algae-derived nanomaterials are cost-effective and methods are easily scalable for household water purification, particularly in resource-limited settings.

=== Fuel creation ===
Algae are an excellent feed stock for green fuel as they are used for the production of biodiesel, bioethanol, biogasoline, biomethanol, biobutanol, and recently biohydrogen.

=== Healthcare ===
Microalgae are of significant use in healthcare. Chlorellin from the green microalga Chlorella is an effective antibiotic against Gram positive and Gram-negative bacteria.

=== Other uses ===
Algae is extremely useful in various fields. An example for natural phycotechnology is the converting of atmospheric nitrogen into bioaccessible nitrogenous compounds by diazotrophic cyanobacteria (blue-green algae). Species of cyanobacteria like Nostoc, Arthrospira (Spirulina) and Aphanizomenon are used as food and feed due to their easy digestibility and nutrient content. Species of Dunaliella provide products like glycerol, carotenoids, and proteins. Algal-produced proteins can be biofactories for the production of therapeutic substances.
