= Characiosiphonaceae =

Scientific classification
- Kingdom: Plantae
- Division: Chlorophyta
- Class: Chlorophyceae
- Order: Chlamydomonadales
- Family: Characiosiphonaceae; Iyengar, 1936

Genera
- Characiosiphon; Lobocharacium

Family of algae

The Characiosiphonaceae are a family of algae in the order Chlamydomonadales. Two genera are included in this family, Characiosiphon and Lobocharacium, each containing a single species. The genus Characiochloris may eventually be placed in this family pending future revisions, as it is phylogenetically closely related to the twose genera.

Algae in the family Characiosiphonaceae are coenocytic, consisting of thalli attached to a substrate. In each coenocyte, there are many separate protoplasms lining a membrane, all surrounding a central sap-filled vacuole. In each protoplasm is a nucleus and a chloroplast surrounding it. Reproduction occurs by fusiform (spindle-shaped) zoospores and spherical gametes.
