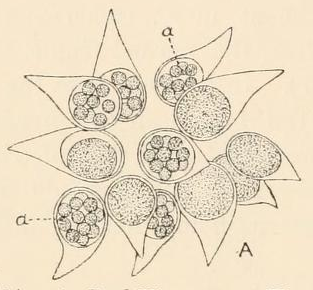

Scientific classification
- Kingdom: Plantae
- Division: Chlorophyta
- Class: Chlorophyceae
- Order: Chlamydomonadales
- Family: Chlorochytriaceae
- Genus: Burkillia; West & G.S.West 1908 ('1907')
- Species: B. cornuta

Binomial name
- Burkillia cornuta G.S.West & West 1907

= Burkillia =

Genus of algae

Burkillia is a genus of green algae, in the family Chlorochytriaceae. The genus is monotypic; the sole species is Burkillia cornuta. Burkillia refers to Isaac Henry Burkill.
