= List of seaweeds of South Africa =

List of seaweeds of South Africa may refer to one of:

- List of green seaweeds of South Africa
- List of brown seaweeds of South Africa
- List of red seaweeds of South Africa
