= Microbiofuel =

Biofuels produced by microorganisms

Microbiofuels are biofuels produced by microorganisms like bacteria, cyanobacteria, microalgae, fungi, etc. The term was first defined by Asen Nenov at TEDxBG event on 9 January, 2010.

- Microbiofuels use biotechnologies for biofuel production;
- Microbiofuels technology implements production methods based microbiorefineries, i.e. micro-organisms placed in a specific environment;
- Microbiofuel technology could be used for recycling industrial waste, including gaseous waste such as carbon dioxide and nitrogen oxide, and for producing valuable biofuels by biotransformation.
