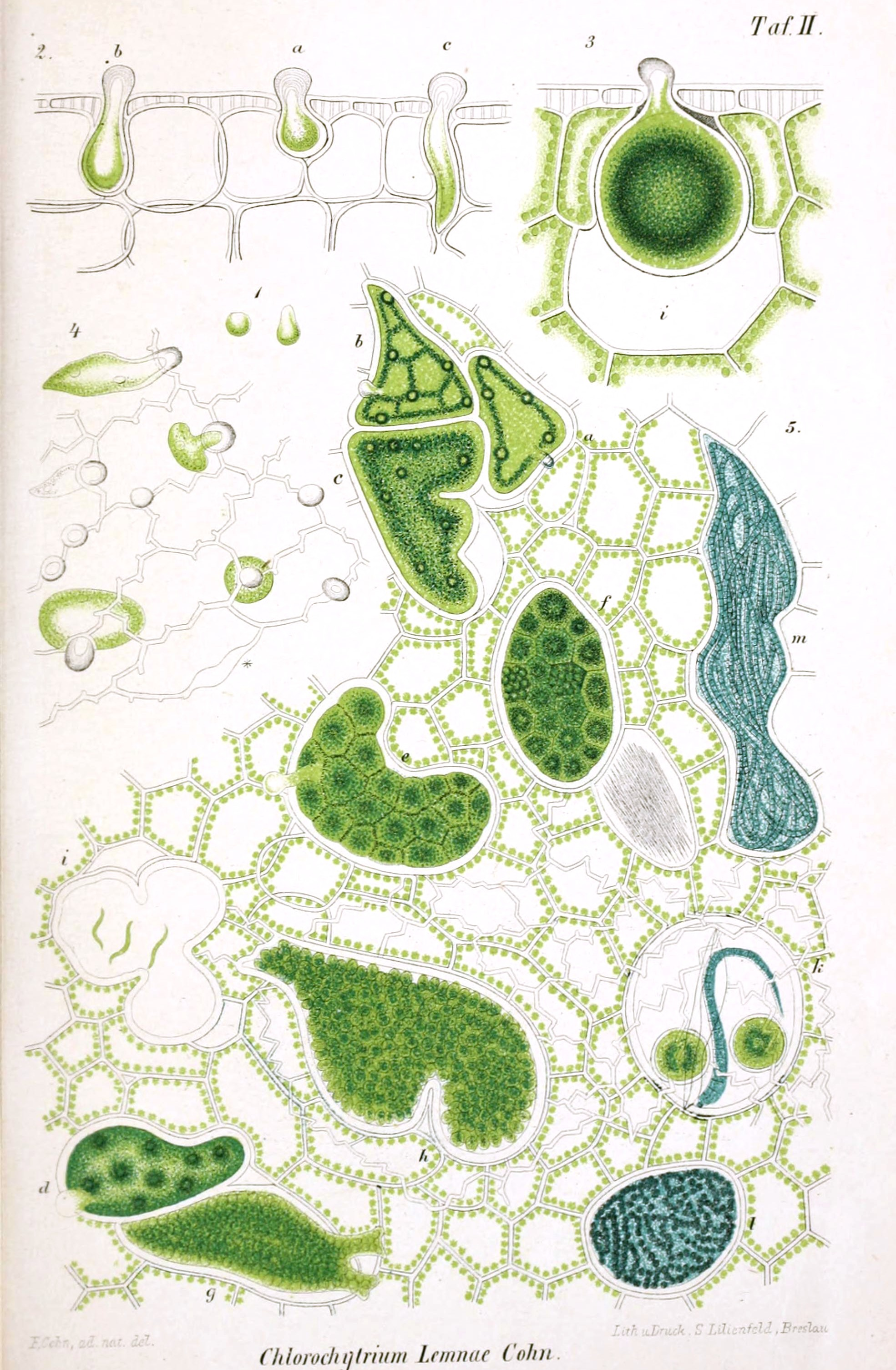
- Chlorochytrium lemnae

Scientific classification
- Kingdom: Plantae
- Division: Chlorophyta
- Class: Chlorophyceae
- Order: Chlamydomonadales
- Family: Chlorochytriaceae
- Genus: Chlorochytrium; Cohn, 1872

Type species
- Chlorochytrium lemnae

Species
- Chlorochytrium bristolae; Chlorochytrium cohnii; Chlorochytrium crassum; Chlorochytrium dermatocolax; Chlorochytrium inclusum; Chlorochytrium lemnae; Chlorochytrium porphyrae; Chlorochytrium sarcophyci; Chlorochytrium schmitzii

Synonyms
- Stomatochytrium D.D.Cunningham 1888; Endosphaera Klebs, 1881

= Chlorochytrium =

Genus of algae

Chlorochytrium is a genus of green algae, in the family Chlorochytriaceae.

== Description ==
This Chlorochytrium sp. was found growing endophytically in the green alga Enteromorpha flexuosa. It is a genus in the division Chlorophyta.
