= Characiosiphon =

Scientific classification
- Kingdom: Plantae
- Division: Chlorophyta
- Class: Chlorophyceae
- Order: Chlamydomonadales
- Family: Characiosiphonaceae
- Genus: Characiosiphon; Iyengar, 1936
- Species: C. rivularis

Binomial name
- Characiosiphon rivularis Iyengar, 1936

Genus of algae

Characiosiphon is a genus of green algae in the family Characiosiphonaceae. It contains a single species, Characiosiphon rivularis.

Characiosiphon rivularis was first described by the Indian phycologist M. O. P. Iyengar in 1936.

== Morphology ==
Characiosiphon rivularis consists of cylindrical thalli, termed coenocytes, attached to a substrate. In culture, the thalli can reach 5 mm in length and 1 mm in width, but can attain even larger sizes in nature. Each coenocyte consists of many small individual regions of the protoplast lining a large vacuole. Each region contains a single large chloroplast, 20–25 μm in diameter, each with a central pyrenoid. The pyrenoid is surrounded by several plates of starch. Many contractile vacuoles are sandwiched between the lobes of the chloroplast. Tucked away near each pyrenoid is a central nucleus.

== Reproduction ==
Both asexual and sexual reproduction occur in Characiosiphon. Asexual reproduction occurs via the formation of zoospores formed by the division of the protoplast. The nucleus is the first to divide, followed by the pyrenoid, then the chloroplast, then the rest of the cell parts. Zoospores are 8–15 μm long, and spindle-shaped with two equal-length flagella. Zoospores contain a single lobed chloroplast and a conspicuous eyespot. Zoospores get released into the central cavity of the thallus, and are eventually released from the thallus (usually at the tip of the thallus) and swim around before eventually settling down. In rare cases, aplanospores are formed instead when zoospores lose their flagella while still in the parent thallus.

Sexual reproduction has also been observed. Characiosiphon is heterothallic, with two different sexes. Gametes are similar in morphology to the zoospores, but smaller and with some amoeboid movement.

== Habitat and distribution ==
Characiosiphon rivularis appears to have a distribution restricted to India and China. It is found in freshwater habitats, particularly flowing waters. It can be found attached to a variety of objects including stones, sticks, other plants, and snails.
