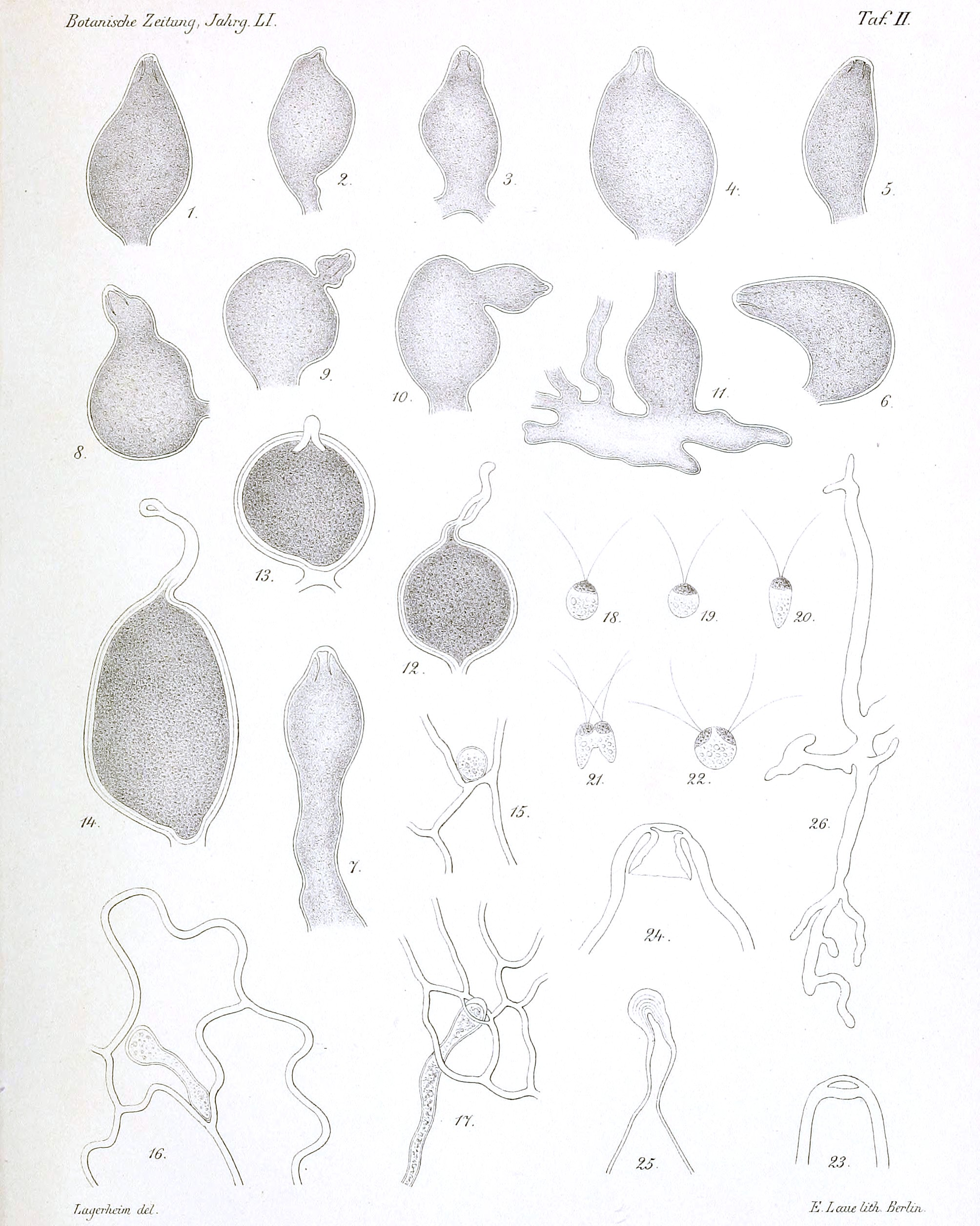
- Rhodochytrium spilanthidis

Scientific classification
- Kingdom: Plantae
- Division: Chlorophyta
- Class: Chlorophyceae
- Order: Chlamydomonadales
- Family: Chlorochytriaceae
- Genus: Rhodochytrium von Lagerheim, 1893

Type species
- Rhodochytrium spilanthidis

Species
- Rhodochytrium spilanthidis

= Rhodochytrium =

Genus of algae

Rhodochytrium is a genus of green algae in the family Chlorochytriaceae.
