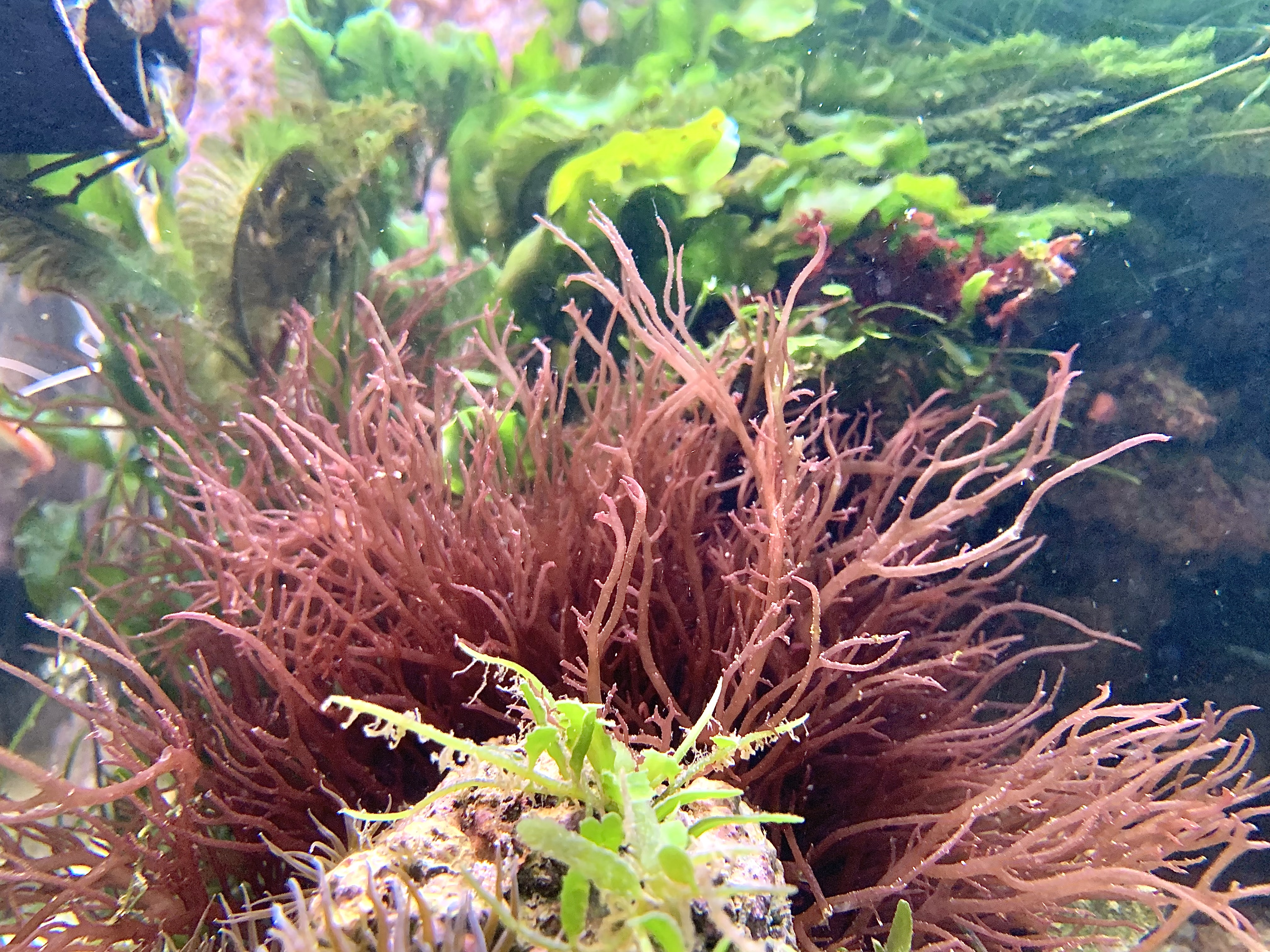
- Gracilaria parvispora in a planted marine aquarium

Scientific classification
- Domain: Eukaryota
- Clade: Archaeplastida
- Division: Rhodophyta
- Class: Florideophyceae
- Order: Gracilariales
- Family: Gracilariaceae
- Genus: Gracilaria
- Species: G. parvispora

Binomial name
- Gracilaria parvispora I.A.Abbott, 1985

= Gracilaria parvispora =

Species of rhodophyte red alga

Gracilaria parvispora, known by the common names ogo, long ogo, red ogo, and (in Hawaiian) limu ogo, is a large species of marine red alga in the genus Gracilaria. Endemic to Hawaii, it is highly sought after as an edible seaweed and is popular in mariculture and the marine aquarium trade.

== Description ==
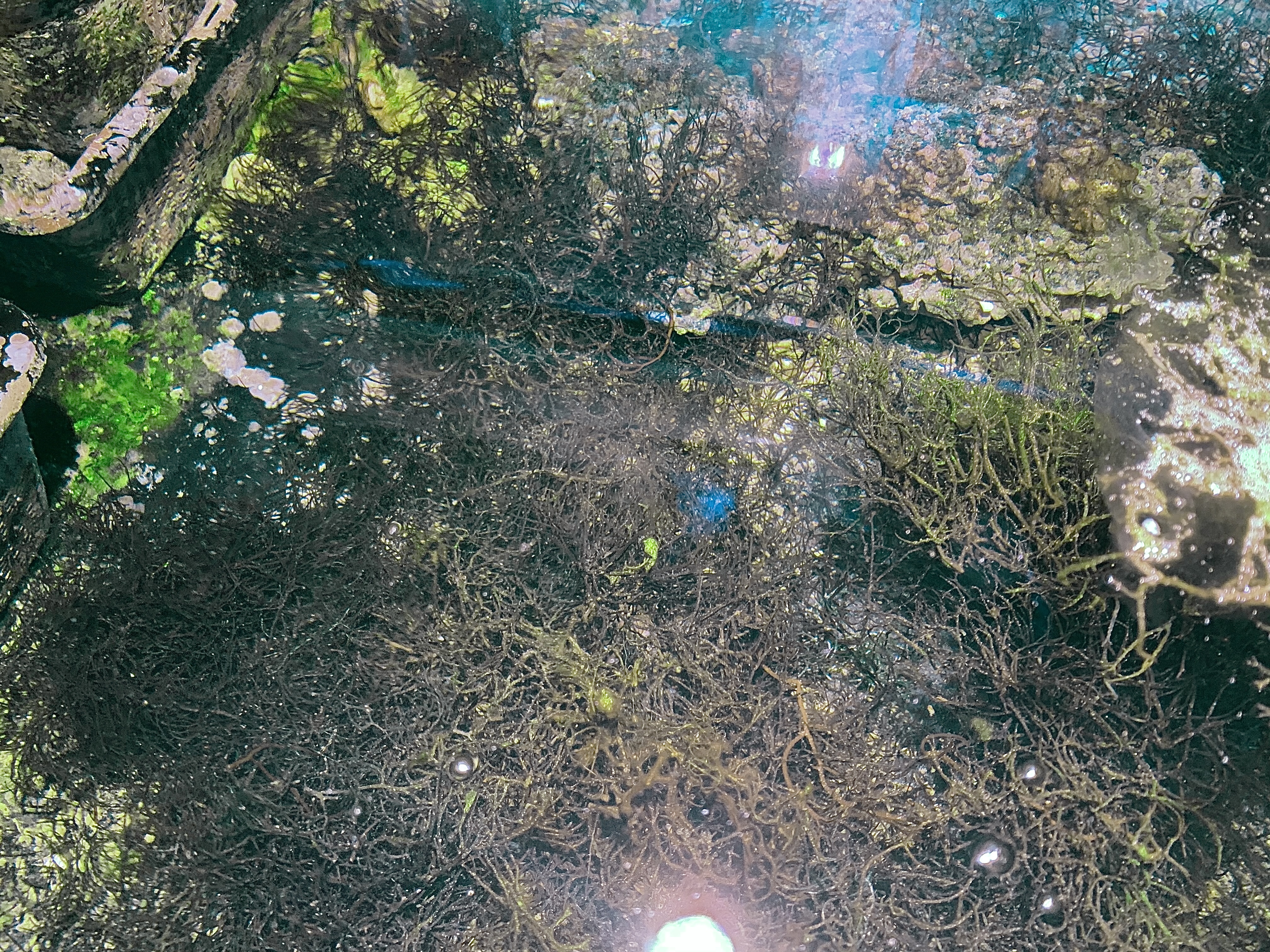
G. parvispora in a refugium, displaying dark coloration under high-intensity lighting

Gracilaria parvispora is composed of pointed, cylindrical branches, 1–4 millimetres (1/16–3/16 in) in diameter, extending from a central axis, 0.8–3.5 mm (1/32–1/8 in) in diameter, with a single holdfast. Individuals reach lengths upwards of 60 cm (23 1/2 in). As with other species of Gracilaria, G. parvispora can be highly variable based on environmental conditions. Though generally red in coloration, it may also be yellow, brown, green, white, and black depending on sunlight, water flow, and depth. The branching of the central axis is also variable, with individuals generally, though not always, displaying three orders of branching and lower water flow and salinity bringing out denser branch growth.

Large, thick-walled medullary cells grade down to 9–15 cm (3 1/2–6 in) in diameter, giving way to a subcortex 1–2 cells thick and a 1-layered cortex in this species. Tetrasporangia, measuring 16 mm × 26 mm (3/4 in × 1 in), are scattered and often pear-shaped. Spermatangia take the form of dimples with modified surrounding cells. Cystocarps are 2–3 mm (1/16–1/8 in) in diameter and are only partially filled by a small internal spore mass. Gonimoblast tissue is thin-walled. Tubular nutritive cells and lateral and vertical pit connections of the pericarp are conspicuous; the pericarp contents are star-shaped.

== Distribution ==
=== Natural distribution ===
Gracilaria parvispora is endemic to Hawaii, with localized distribution around the islands of Oahu and Molokai. It can be found in Kāneʻohe Bay, Ke’ehi Lagoon, One’ula Beach, and ‘Ewa Beach and at Hau’ula, Coconut Island, and the Oceanic Institute of Hawaii Pacific University. Populations of G. parvispora in Molokai are the result of experimental outplantings of spore-bearing gravel, introduced between 1983 and 1985 east of Kaunakakai.

It is hypothesized that G. parvispora is native to Asia and was later introduced to Hawaii for cultivation, although there is no conclusive evidence of this. Gracilaria parvispora may have also been a narrow endemic to the islands until its range was expanded by aquaculture. Occurrences of Gracilaria bursa-pastoris from Korea and Japan may actually represent a misidentification of G. parvispora.

=== Presence in Baja California Sur ===
Gracilaria parvispora is an introduced species in Baja California Sur and has been found in San Ignacio Lagoon, San Buto, San Juan de la Costa, and La Concha Beach. The alga's current distribution in the eastern Pacific Ocean and its impacts on native biodiversity remain relatively unknown.

== Ecology ==
Gracilaria parvispora inhabits reef flats and areas with sand-coated rocky substrate. It is tolerant of a wide range of environmental conditions, preferring nutrient rich water, moderate to high lighting and current, dKH between 8 and 12, pH between 8.1 and 8.4, water salinity between 1.010 and 1.025 SG, water temperature between 22 and 28 °C (71.6 and 82.4 °F), calcium between 390 and 440 ppm, magnesium between 1,200 and 1,400 ppm, phosphate between 0.01 and 0.1 ppm, and nitrate between 1 and 20 ppm.

Under ideal conditions, the alga is a fast grower and rapidly absorbs micronutrients, capable of increasing its biomass by 150% or more in a single month. In fact, it is one of the fastest growing species of Gracilaria and is one of the larger species of red algae native to the Hawaiian Islands. Though once common in the region, the alga has become overharvested, with the invasive G. salicornia having largely replaced Gracilaria parvispora around the island of Oahu.

== Conservation ==
Alongside Gracilaria coronopifolia and Asparagopsis taxiformis, G. parvispora is one of the three most highly sought-after edible seaweeds in the Hawaiian Islands; there may possibly be an export market for dried G. parvispora. In Hawaii, it has historically been incorporated into recipes representing Hawaiian, Korean, Filipino, Japanese and Caucasian cuisines, such as poke, or eaten raw.

In the 1930s, G. parvispora began to be commercially harvested in Oahu and would become the most popular seaweed in Honolulu fish markets up until the 1970s. Since then, overharvesting has made this species increasingly rare in the wild; its limited availability led to the importation and mariculture of Atlantic Gracilaria tikvaheae as a replacement, which differs from G. parvispora in taste, texture, and appearance. In 1988, the collection of fertile Gracilaria parvispora, with cystocarps, was outlawed.

=== Mariculture ===
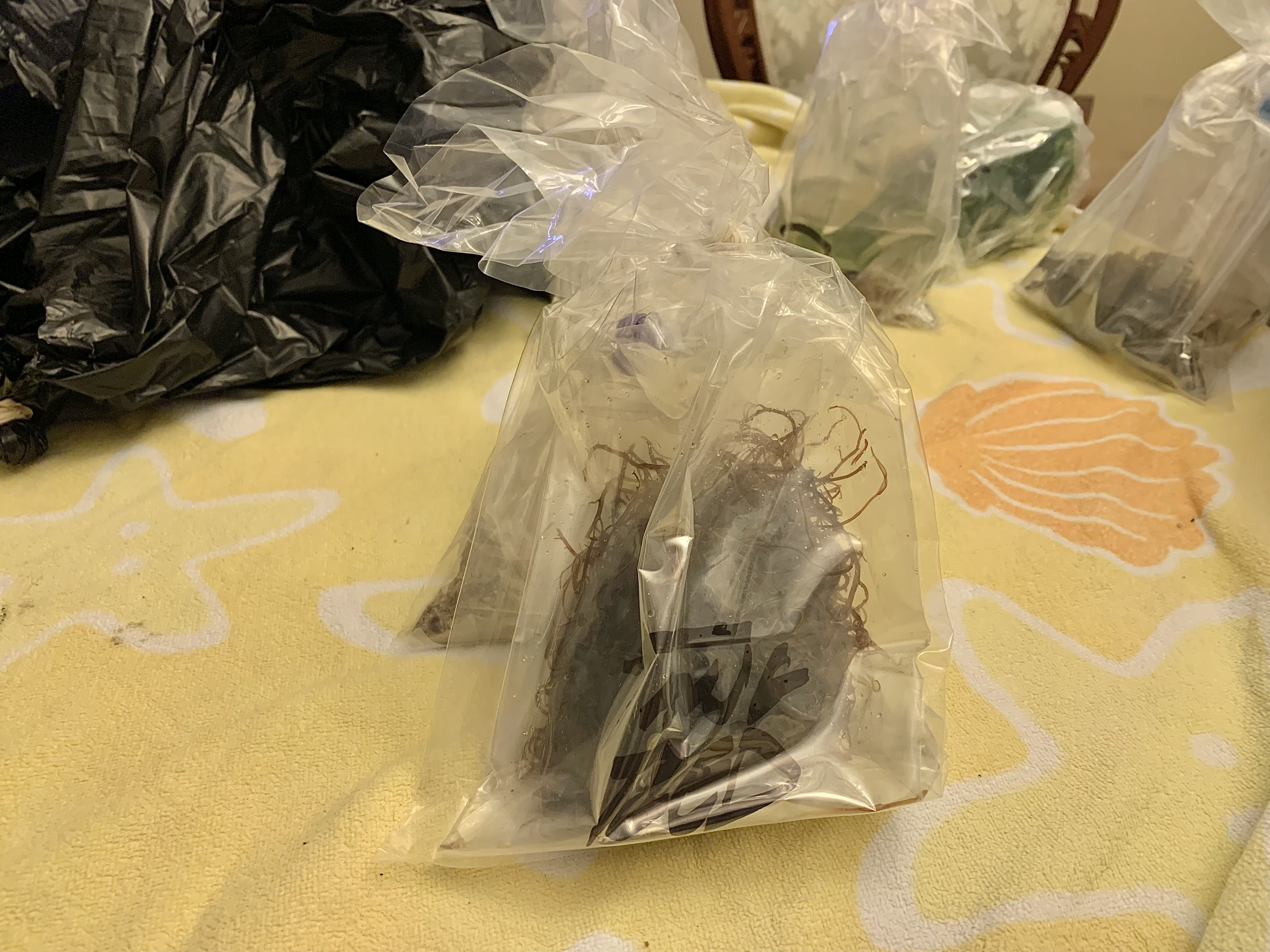
Gracilaria parvispora, maricultured in Kailua-Kona, Hawaii and shipped to the contiguous United States for use in a refugium.

Mariculture of G. parvispora has been extensively researched. In 1991, researchers at the University of Arizona experimented on growing G. parvispora in Hawaiian fishponds along Molokai's south shore. It was successfully maricultured at mean yields of 0.6 kg/m^{2}/week (0.1 lb/sq ft/week) when grown inside floating baskets. Lower water current, at water velocities such as 5 cm/s (2.0 in/s), were found to be desirable. Higher current, at water velocities such as 13 cm/s (5.1 in/s), may encourage undesirable epiphyte growth, including Lyngbya majuscula, Hypnea cervicornis, and Acanthophora spicifera. Growing G. parvispora attached to lines submerged in Ualapue Pond also yielded high growth rates albeit with poor recovery as the thalli were often severed. Growing G. parvispora in Ualapue Pond within bottom culture pens resulted in low growth rates due to low light penetration and smothering by silt. The species is also difficult to maintain in tank cultures, failing to develop desirable, fine branches (likely due to excessive water flow) and eventually fragmenting into necrotic pieces after several weeks. Resources necessary for water exchange in tank cultures are also prohibitively expensive and energy intensive, including shoreline modifications, a pumping station, and a seawater discharge point.

== Nutrition ==
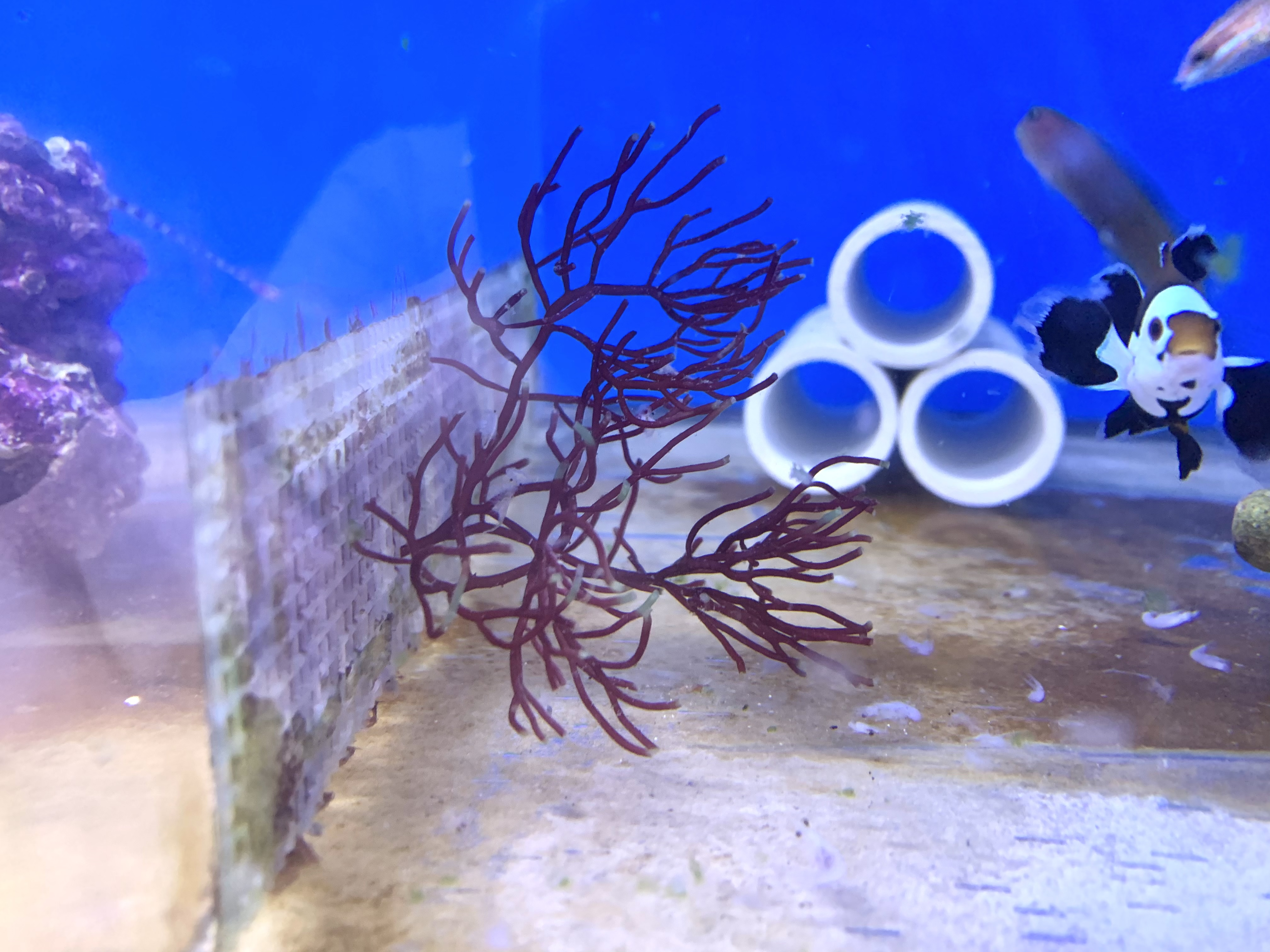
Gracilaria parvispora being fed to teleosts at the tropical fish store, Aquatic Collection, in Hayward, California

In 2003, researchers at the University of Hawaiʻi analyzed the nutritional composition of 22 edible Hawaiian seaweed species, including G. parvispora. Fresh G. parvispora was found to be composed of 90.4 ± 0.1% water. Composition and caloric content of dried, powdered G. parvispora was found to be 48.1 ± 0.4% ash, 7.6 ± 0.4% total protein, 22.9 ± 0.9% soluble carbohydrate, 2.8 ± 0.3% crude lipid, and 1,358 ± 66.4 cal/g (38,498.7 ± 1,882.4 cal/oz) for powder. The riboflavin content of dried, powdered G. parvispora was found to be 0.006 mg/g (0.0001 oz/lb). The essential mineral element content of dried, powdered G. parvispora was found to be 1.48% nitrogen, 0.15% phosphorus, 16.00% potassium, 0.49% magnesium, 0.38% calcium, 3.99% sulfur, 242 μg/g (0.0039 oz/lb) boron, 8 μg/g (0.0001 oz/lb) zinc, 48 μg/g (0.0008 oz/lb) manganese, 198 μg/g (0.0032 oz/lb) iron, and 3 μg/g (5×10^{−5} oz/lb) copper. Like other aquacultured Gracilaria species, G. parvispora did not have an unusually high nutritional value.

== In aquaria ==
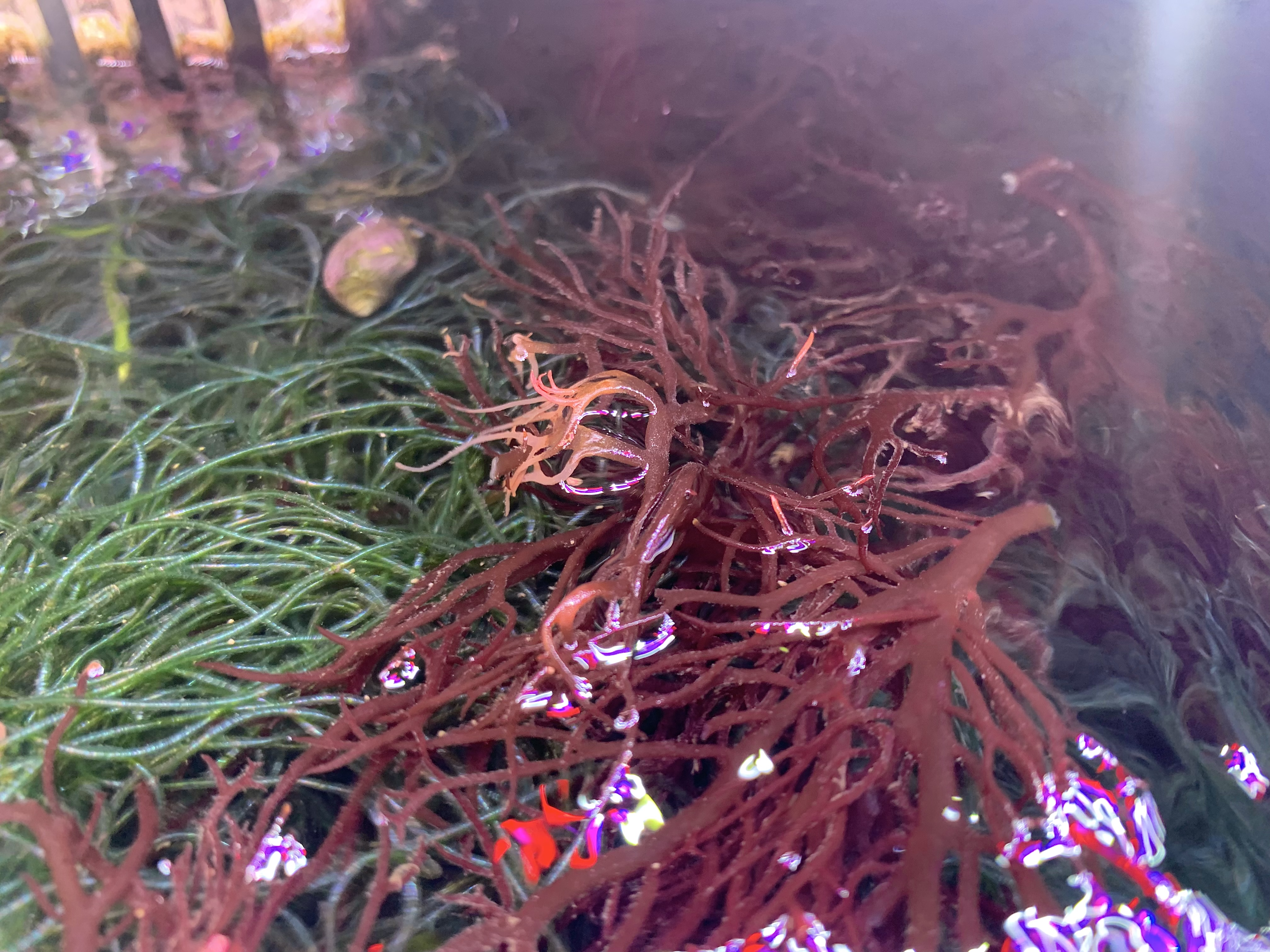
Gracilaria parvispora in a planted marine aquarium. A dying portion of the thallus emits an orange fluorescence.

Gracilaria parvispora is a highly functional macroalga in marine aquaria and is the most popular species of Gracilaria in the marine aquarium hobby. It is known to be very hardy, though it should ideally be supplemented with trace elements, such as iron. Additionally, G. parvispora can both be grown attached to substrate or left unattached and gently tumbled to dislodge detritus from its branches. Often, this alga is used in refugia for nutrient export, though it also has applications as a hitching post for seahorses and for display. Due to its rapid growth rate, trimmings of G. parvispora can be harvested from a refugium and used as a nutritious food source for various herbivorous fish and invertebrates, including tangs, rabbitfish, pygmy angelfish, and blennies. If the alga begins to turn white, the affected thallus should be removed as this is a sign of decomposition.

== See also ==
- Gracilaria
- Limu (algae)
- List of marine aquarium plant species
- Mariculture
- Refugium (fishkeeping)
- Seaweed farming
