= Gracilaria changii =

Scientific classification
- Clade: Archaeplastida
- Division: Rhodophyta
- Class: Florideophyceae
- Order: Gracilariales
- Family: Gracilariaceae
- Genus: Gracilaria
- Species: G. changii

Binomial name
- Gracilaria changii (B.M.Xia & I.A.Abbott) I.A.Abbott, J.Zhang & B.M.Xia

Species of alga

Gracilaria changii is an agarophytic red algae mostly found in mangroves. The nuclear and chloroplast genomes of G. changii have been sequenced.
