= Gracilaria chilensis =

Scientific classification
- Domain: Eukaryota
- Clade: Archaeplastida
- Division: Rhodophyta
- Class: Florideophyceae
- Order: Gracilariales
- Family: Gracilariaceae
- Genus: Gracilaria
- Species: G. chilensis

Binomial name
- Gracilaria chilensis C.J.Bird, McLachlan & E.C.Oliveira (1986)

Species of alga

Gracilaria chilensis (pelillo) is an agarophytic red algae from Pacific South America. It is edible and is the main cultivated seaweed in Chile.
