= Gracilaria debilis =

Scientific classification
- Domain: Eukaryota
- Clade: Archaeplastida
- Division: Rhodophyta
- Class: Florideophyceae
- Order: Gracilariales
- Family: Gracilariaceae
- Genus: Gracilaria
- Species: G. debilis

Binomial name
- Gracilaria debilis (Forsskål) Børgesen (1932)

Synonyms
- Fucus debilis Forsskål, 1775

Species of alga

Gracilaria debilis is an agarophytic red algae. Its scientific name derives from the Latin word meaning "weak". It is cultivated for industrial and nutraceutical applications.
