= Gracilaria domingensis =

Scientific classification
- Domain: Eukaryota
- Clade: Archaeplastida
- Division: Rhodophyta
- Class: Florideophyceae
- Order: Gracilariales
- Family: Gracilariaceae
- Genus: Gracilaria
- Species: G. domingensis

Binomial name
- Gracilaria domingensis (Kützing) Sonder ex Dickie, 1874

Synonyms
- Sphaerococcus domingensis Kützing, 1869

Species of alga

Gracilaria domingensis is an agarophytic red algae. G. domingensis is commonly found along the tropical west Atlantic Ocean. While its name references its type locality being from Santo Domingo, it is also very widely distributed along the Brazilian coast.
