= Pterocladiophila =

Scientific classification
- Clade: Archaeplastida
- Division: Rhodophyta
- Class: Florideophyceae
- Order: Gracilariales
- Family: Pterocladiophilaceae
- Genus: Pterocladiophila; Fan & Papenfuss, 1959

Genus of algae

Pterocladiophila is a genus of red algae, parasite of other red algae.
