= Sump (aquarium) =

Aquarium accessory tank for mechanical equipment

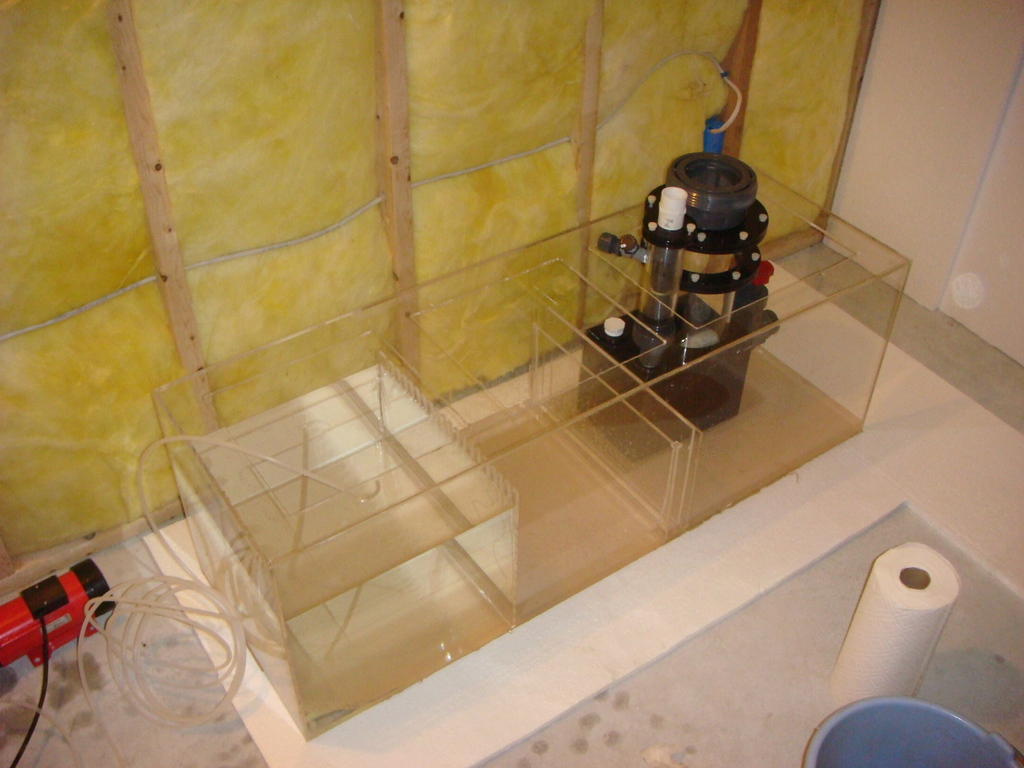
A sump with three compartments including a protein skimmer

In fishkeeping, a sump is an accessory aquarium tank in which mechanical equipment is kept. A remote sump allows for a clutter-free display tank.

It is found mainly in a reef aquarium or marine aquarium. The sump sits below the main tank, and is used as a filter, as well as a holding place for unsightly, miscellaneous equipment such as protein skimmers, calcium reactors, and heaters. The main advantage of having a sump plumbed into an aquarium is the increase of water volume in the system, making it more stable and less prone to fluctuations of pH and salinity, and also mitigating the effects of nutrient buildup or the unintentional introduction of foreign substances. In addition, some sumps have a compartment that can be converted into a refugium, helping to filter out excess nutrients such as nitrates.

A sump can also improve aeration of the water in the aquarium. Water movement between the sump and the display tank helps with gas exchange between the water and air. Increased dissolved oxygen is beneficial to fish and can also aid in avoiding Cyanobacteria outbreaks.
