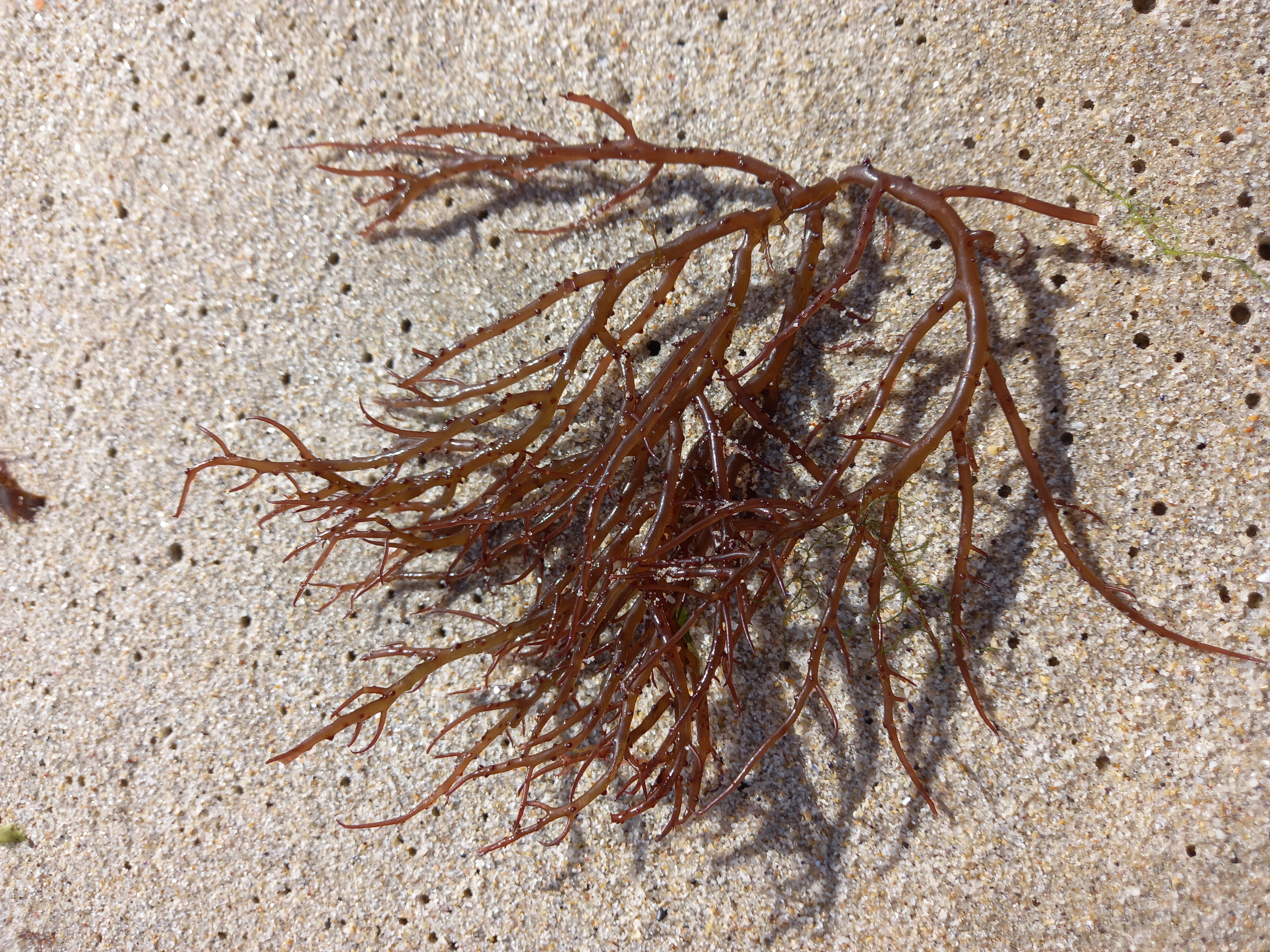

Scientific classification
- Domain: Eukaryota
- Clade: Archaeplastida
- Division: Rhodophyta
- Class: Florideophyceae
- Order: Gracilariales
- Family: Gracilariaceae
- Genus: Gracilaria
- Species: G. coronopifolia

Binomial name
- Gracilaria coronopifolia J.Agardh

= Gracilaria coronopifolia =

Species of algae

Gracilaria coronopifolia, also known as limu manauea in Hawaiian, or ogo in Japanese, is a species of edible red algae (Rhodophyta) endemic to Hawai'i.

== Description ==
Gracilaria coronopifolia features many cylindrical branches that reach out from its stipe, which resembles a bush with no leaves. Typically this species is found to be around six to fifteen centimeters tall, and red or pink in appearance.

== Distribution and habitat ==
Gracilaria coronopifolia is endemic to Hawaii and typically occurs close to the shore in tidepools or in the first four meters of the subtidal zone, attached to limestone or other hard surfaces. It is considered one of the most common algae found in the intertidal zone in the Hawaiian islands.

== Human use ==
Due to the abundance of gracilaria coronopifolia, it has been commonly used for human consumption in Hawai'i. Outside of Hawai'i, countries like: Japan, Korea, and the Philippines also enjoy gracilaria coronopifolia for consumption, despite it not occurring naturally in these countries. Gracilaria coronopifolia is typically eaten as a salad or pickled as a side dish. It is described to have a crispy texture and features a color change to green once cooked. Gracilaria coronopifolia is considered to be a "superfood" due to its abundance of potassium, calcium, magnesium and other beneficial vitamins and minerals.

Gracilaria coronopifolia is also commonly used in aquarium fish food.
