= Sump =

Sump may refer to:

- An infiltration basin used to manage surface runoff water and recharge underground aquifers
- Sump (cave), a permanently flooded section of a cave, where an underground flow of water exits the cave into the earth such that the caver must submerge under water to reach the other side
- the lowest point in a basement, which collects water that enters from outside and can be moved back out with a sump pump
- the sump at the bottom of an internal combustion engine, where oil pools
  - dry sump in racing motorcycles and piston aircraft engines
  - wet sump
- Sump (aquarium)
- A sump section below the mouthpiece of a diving snorkel
- the sump in a nuclear power plant's reactor housing that collects any overflow of primary loop coolant
- In a shaft sinking, the water handling facility of the mine often at its lowest point
- the bilge of a boat
- the vitreous humour, which serves a minor role as a metabolic sump of the human eye
- a grenade sump in a foxhole
- the sump, the center of the cosmos in medieval cosmology
