= DKH (disambiguation) =

dKH is a unit for the carbonate hardness of water.

DKH may also refer to:

- Juneyao Airlines, ICAO airline designator
- Darkhana railway station, railway station in Pakistan with station code DKH
- A Porsche flat-six engine
