= Marine aquarium =

Salt water aquarium

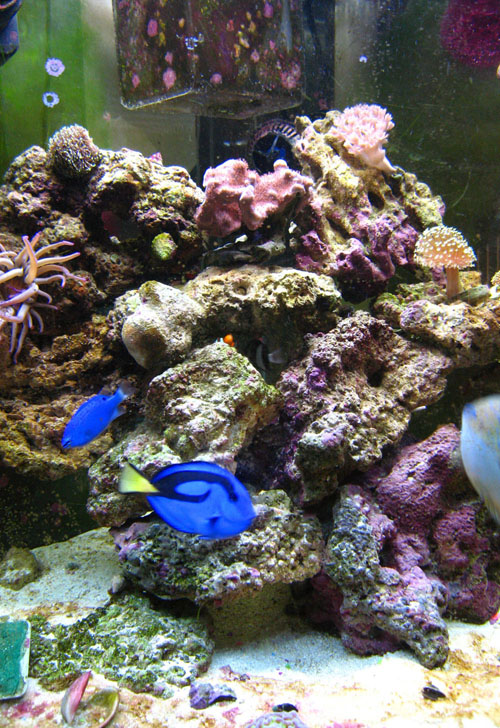
A marine aquarium

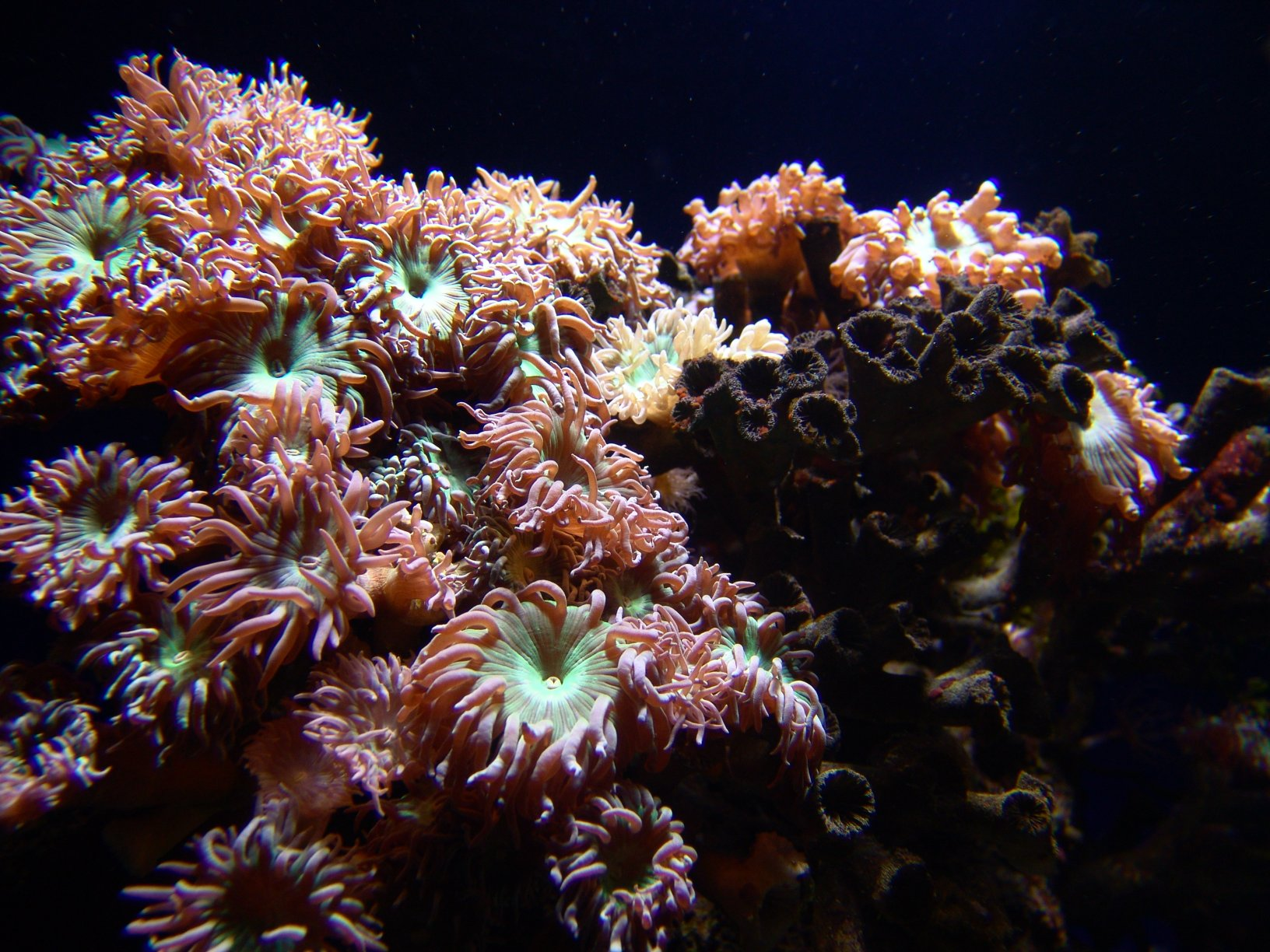
Corals in a marine aquarium

A marine aquarium is an aquarium that keeps marine plants and animals in a contained environment. Marine aquaria are further subdivided by hobbyists into fish only (FO), fish only with live rock (FOWLR), and reef aquaria. Fish only tanks often showcase large or aggressive marine fish species and generally rely on mechanical and chemical filtration. FOWLR and reef tanks use live rock, a material composed of coral skeletons harboring beneficial nitrogen waste metabolizing bacteria, as a means of more natural biological filtration. Reef aquariums display live corals, invertebrates and fish.

Marine fishkeeping is different from its freshwater counterpart because of the fundamental differences in the constitution of saltwater and the resulting differences in the adaptation of its inhabitants. A stable marine aquarium requires more equipment than freshwater systems, and generally requires more stringent water quality monitoring. The inhabitants of a marine aquarium are often difficult to acquire and are usually more expensive than freshwater aquarium inhabitants.

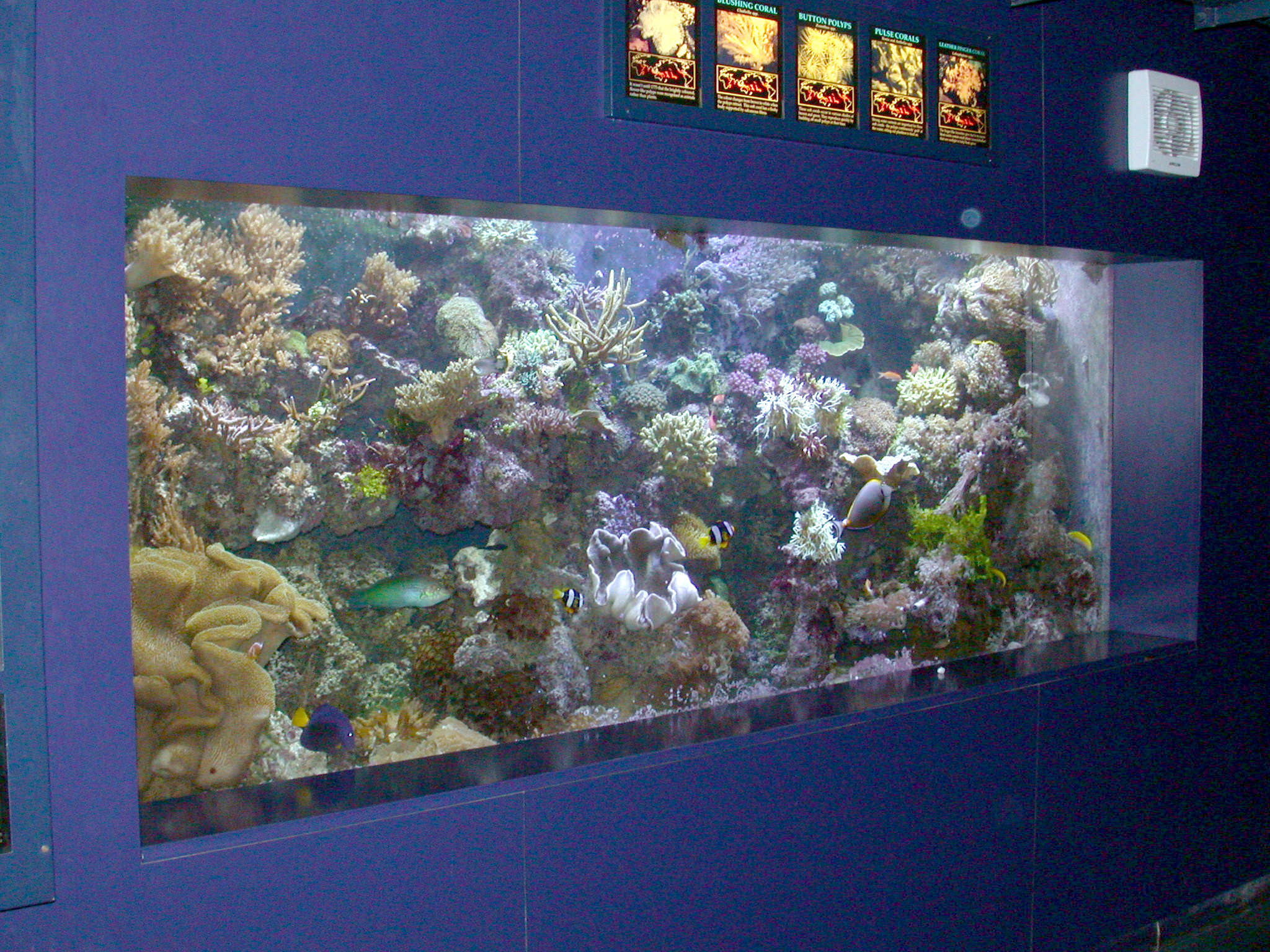
Marine reef aquarium at the London aquarium

== Marine fishkeeping history ==
The first saltwater tanks were Venetian glass jars where the Romans kept anemones outdoors, but these systems were very short lived.

The Aztec Empire had 10 ponds of saltwater aquariums at Texcoco.

In 1846, Anna Thynne maintained stony corals and seaweed for almost three years, and was credited as the creator of the first balanced marine aquarium in London.

Personal saltwater fishkeeping began on a wider scale in the 1950s, starting with the basic rectangular glass aquariums (usually 20 gallon), still popular today. Bleached coral along with a substrate of coarse crushed coral were the norm. Algae, including beneficial types such as coralline algae, were viewed negatively and were generally removed. The clean, sterile tank was viewed as the healthiest.

During the early days of marine aquaria, saltwater was collected at local beaches. Natural saltwater contains many unwanted organisms and pollutants. Aquarium literature of the time suggests that the most commonly kept marine fish were the percula clownfish, sergeant major damselfish, small, brackish-water pufferfish and scats, jeweled blennies, and blue damsels. Aquariums were equipped with large air compressors, and were heavily aerated and filtered (primarily with undergravel filters, a norm for some time).

An ever-growing number of hobbyists experiencing the inconvenience of gathering natural sea water and the concurrent development of analytical chemistry techniques led to research into the chemical composition of sea water. Synthetic salt mixes were developed to replicate the chemical environment of the tropical ocean, including trace elements and salts. This advance made marine fishkeeping popular in areas without access to clean sea water.

Air driven, counter-current protein skimmers and reliable submersible electric heaters were invented in Germany. Various advances in filtration included trickle and hang-on filters, both allowing a more natural equilibrium in the aquarium environment. The advancement of fluorescent lighting technologies to provide higher output, along with metal halide lighting, enabled the first reef tanks, making it possible to keep corals and other invertebrates without natural sunlight.

More efficient chemical testing allowed aquarists to understand the chemical properties of aquariums. By the 1980s, a biologically based understanding of how to maintain an artificial ocean environment brought more successful and widespread marine fishkeeping.

== Modern fishkeeping ==
=== Marine aquarium components ===
The major components are an aquarium, usually made from glass or acrylic, filtration equipment, lighting, and an aquarium heater. Marine aquariums can range in volume from less than 80 litres, (< 20 US gal) to over 1,200 litres (300 US gal). Small volumes are more difficult to maintain due to the more rapid changes in water chemistry. The majority of saltwater aquariums are between 160 and 400 litres (40 and 100 US gal).

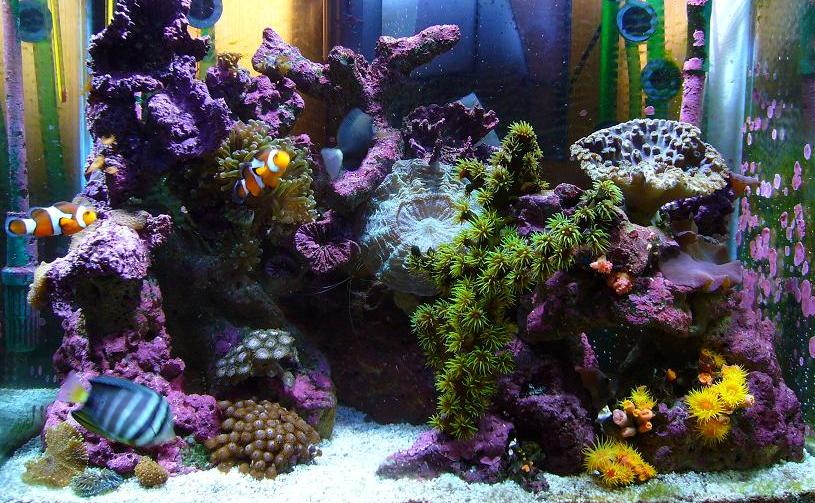
Nano reef aquarium maintained at home

=== Types of marine aquariums ===
Marine aquarists typically divide saltwater aquariums into those housing fish only, those housing fish with live rock, and those primarily designed to house corals and other invertebrates (also known as reef aquariums). Many fish hobbyists also divide the types of saltwater tanks based on the water temperatures at which they are kept.

==== Tropical marine ====
The most common type of saltwater fish tank, the tropical marine tank, houses marine animals from tropical climates. Usually kept between 24 and 28 °C (75 and 82 °F), these tanks include tropical reef tanks, as well as fish-only tanks. These tanks tend to have a low concentration of microscopic plankton and other foods eaten by filter feeders. Most livestock for these aquariums are acquired through commercial means.

==== Temperate marine (coldwater marine) ====
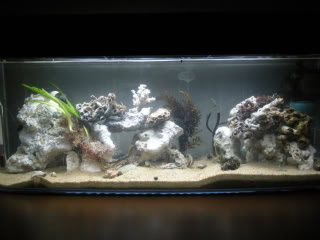
A temperate marine aquarium

One of the more obscure types of fish tanks, the coldwater marine tank, holds fish of temperate climates, with temperatures ranging around 10 to 24 °C (50 to 75 °F). Colorful species such as the ornate cowfish, blennies, and sea anemones can be found. The anemones and invertebrates in temperate waters easily rival their tropical counterparts. Most colorful species are found in the western Pacific and west coast of North America. Maintenance of these tanks is similar to keeping a fish only tank with live rock, or a non-photosynthetic tropical aquarium.

A significant diversity of species exists. Since coldwater coral reefs only occur at great depths, most hobbyists are largely confined to fish, sea anemones, crustaceans, echinoderms, mollusks and Feather duster worms. A few corals can be found at low depths. Since there are very few commercially available coldwater fish and invertebrates, hobbyists usually have to physically acquire specimens, although recently more specimens have become commercially available from the west coast of the United States as well as Japan, Australia, and the UK. The most common methods of acquisition are by trolling or seining, and experienced hobbyists use the movement of tides and searching methods to find certain species. Unlike commercially available tropical fish, whose behavior patterns and tank compatibilities have been well documented in the last five or six decades, coldwater fish have been kept in public and private aquaria for over two centuries and much ichthyological knowledge has been gathered in order to maintain them.

Many temperate fish have specific local diet requirements, while others, will eat just about any crustacean or frozen foods. Some fish should not be kept with fish small enough to fit into its mouth, crabs or mollusks. Similarly some crabs can not be kept with some mollusks, while other fish, crabs, mollusks and echinoderms may be compatible with each other. It takes experience before one can successfully gauge the compatibility of the fish and invertebrates in one's area. Due to it being such a localized hobby in the United States, not many people go the route of local tanks which are far more popular in Europe.

=== Live rock ===
Live rock is rock that has been in the ocean, composed of limestone and decomposing coral skeleton, usually around a coral reef such as those around Fiji, and is usually covered with beneficial algae, coralline and tiny invertebrates and bacteria that are desirable in the aquarium. Some examples of the microfauna commonly found on live rock are crabs, snails, feather dusters, brittle stars, starfish, limpets, abalones, and an occasional sea urchin, sea anemone, coral, and sea sponge. Also, if the aquarist is unlucky, a mantis shrimp. Bristleworms are also common, most of which, while unattractive, are not harmful and are useful scavengers; some species can be pests, however. The addition of live rock is one of the best ways to ensure a healthy aquarium, as the rock provides a buffer to maintain high pH (8.0-8.3), alkalinity, and acid-neutralizing capacity. Alkalinity is often known by a rather confusing term, "carbonate hardness", or KH. This is usually measured in "degrees" (dKH) or meq/L.

The microfauna found on live rock are detrivores and herbivores (as they eat algae and fish waste), and provide fish with a natural, attractive shelter. Live rock usually arrives from online dealers as "uncured", and must be quarantined in a separate tank while undergoing the curing process, which involves the inevitable die-off of some of the rock's inhabitants and the subsequent production of undesirable ammonia and nitrite. Live rock that is already cured is available at most pet stores that cater to saltwater. Live sand is similar to live rock and is equally desirable.

Sometimes hobbyists use so-called "dry rock", which is simply old live rock that has been allowed to dry out and to lose most of its live inhabitants, to keep unwanted pests out of their aquariums, and as an inexpensive alternative to live rock.

=== Filtration ===
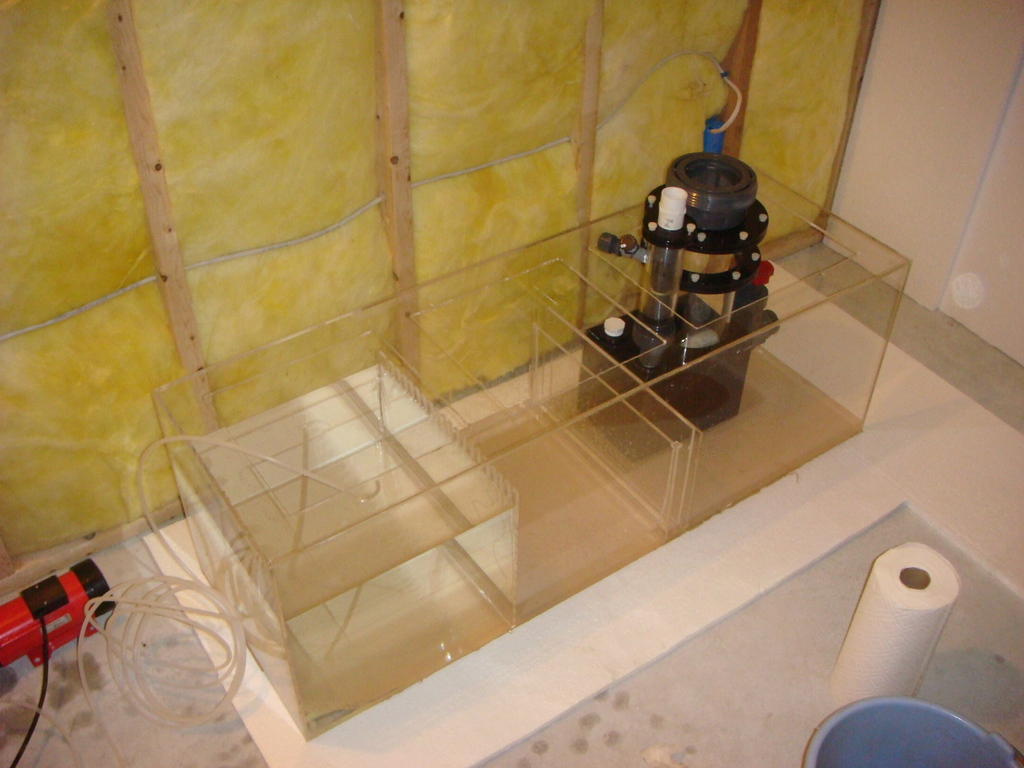
A new sump with three compartments including a protein skimmer

In general, marine aquariums have more complex filtration requirements than most freshwater aquariums. The various components frequently include wet and dry filters and protein skimmers. Protein skimmers are devices that remove organic compounds prior to their degradation, and are very useful in marine aquariums. Protein skimming is also used in the popular Berlin method that relies on live rock and periodic partial water changes to degrade and remove waste products. The Berlin method requires large amounts of live rock in the aquarium. The rule of thumb is 1/2–1 lb. per 1 US gallon (0.2–0.4 kg per 4 liters).

Many marine aquariums include a sump, which is an external container connected to the main aquarium with a water pump. In most setups, the sump is located below the aquarium and is fed water from the main tank via an overflow. An overflow at its simplest is a round hole drilled towards the top of the tank, connected via tubing to an output below it. As the water level increases past the height of the overflow (weir), the water "overflows" the tank and falls through to the sump below. It is typical to have tall combs on the overflow edge so fish do not jump inside. The water circulation is powered by a water pump in the sump, which pushes the water up into the tank, thus causing more water to flow over and perpetuating the cycle. There are many advantages to using a sump, both for the appearance and the health of the tank. The sump helps the appearance of the tank, because it allows filtration and maintenance equipment (protein skimmer, heater, activated carbon) to be kept out of sight of the main tank. It also ensures that the water level of the main aquarium never changes, as the overflow sets the water level in the main tank. The sump aids tank health by helping to oxygenate the water by increasing the amount of water/air surface area used for gas exchange.

Some marine aquariums also include a refugium. Refugiums are small containers or aquariums that are hidden behind or beneath the main aquarium and connected to it via a water pump (often in a similar manner to a sump). Refugiums have recently become quite popular among reef aquarists because they can be used to serve several purposes such as adding water volume or providing a fish-free site for biological filtration in live rock and/or the sandbed. Fish-free refugiums host populations of copepods, amphipods, isopods, and other zooplankton.

=== Lighting ===
A DIY metal halide pendant lamp

Regular cyclical lighting is used in aquariums to simulate day and night. This is beneficial for fish and invertebrates since it establishes a routine, enables them to rest, and makes them feel more secure. Aside from establishing a routine, high output lighting is required for many invertebrates such as corals and anemones to survive. Lighting in marine tanks that contain only fish and live rock is not an important issue.

In marine aquariums containing corals, or other photosynthetic invertebrates, where algal growth (of both free-living and symbiotic algae) is desired, more intense lighting is required. Since the intensity of the light will vary based on the source and distance from the source, lighting requirements are sometimes described using a measurement called Photosynthetically Available Radiation, or PAR.

Various light sources include but are not limited to: natural sunlight, fluorescent, VHO fluorescent (Very High Output), T-5 fluorescent, compact fluorescent, LED and metal halide. Each type of lighting has its own advantages and disadvantages. They all vary in initial cost, maintenance cost, spectrum obtainable, longevity, efficiency, and power.

==== Natural sunlight ====
The most primitive lighting source is natural sunlight. This is only effective in areas near the equator because the intensity of sunlight is greatest there. Efficiently utilizing natural sunlight requires complex planning and, as such, this method is applied on only the largest reef systems. Many times in the hobby natural sunlight is actually avoided due to the low spectrum of lighting it has. The yellow tint is often undesirable and is believed to encourage problem algae, though studies show it does not.

==== Incandescent ====
Incandescent lamps have been phased out over the years. They are wasteful of energy, producing between 15 and 30 lumens per watt of power (out of a possible 683 lumens per watt for an ideal light source). They can be found many times in older aquarium light hoods. They burn out frequently, put off a lot of heat, and normally do not have an appropriate spectrum associated with them. Most incandescent lamps can be replaced with commonly available and efficient screw in power compact bulbs.

==== Standard fluorescent ====
Standard fluorescent tubes are the common light bars found in commercial ceilings. Fluorescent lighting has more color temperatures available which are more suited to aquariums than those of incandescent bulbs. They are also more efficient than incandescent lighting, averaging between 90 and 95 lumens per watt. The downside to regular fluorescent lights is that they do not have the intensity to penetrate into deeper aquariums.

==== Higher-output fluorescent ====
There are several improved variations of fluorescent technology. The main ones are very high output (VHO), power compact fluorescent (PC), and T-5 high output (HO).

VHO fluorescent lamps run at higher power levels, usually about three times the standard wattage for a given bulb length. They have the advantage of high light output, but the larger diameter bulbs limit the efficiency of reflectors and the number of bulbs that can be fit in an aquarium hood.

PC lighting is also high-power fluorescent lighting, but the tubes are thinner and are often folded over one another to reduce size. Most spiral-shaped energy-efficient light bulbs commercially available for house lighting are power compact fluorescent bulbs. PC bulbs are recommended to be replaced every six months to a year to keep the desired light spectrum.

T-5 HO lights are the newest variation on fluorescent lights. They are run at slightly higher power levels than standard fluorescent lamps, but are made significantly thinner than standard fluorescent bulbs, which allows for more efficient reflector designs that get more light into the aquarium. Higher quality T-5 systems often match or exceed the output of equivalent power compact fluorescent or VHO lighting fixtures. On the downside, T-5 lighting is the most expensive type fluorescent lighting available. Many times it is much cheaper per watt, especially in the long run with the multiple T-5 bulbs being replaced, to use an equivalent metal halide light setup over a T-5 setup if such high light output is required.

All types of fluorescent lighting offer the same efficiency in lumens per watt; it is the shape of the bulb and reflectors that makes their overall outputs different.

==== Metal halide ====
Metal halide lights are generally the highest output lighting commercially available. They produce about 90-100 lumens per watt of power. This is roughly the same as fluorescent. The improvement with metal halides is that they concentrate this light output into a very small space, whereas fluorescent lights evenly illuminate the entire aquarium. This is often referred to as point source lighting, and is what causes the rippling visual effect on many advanced aquarium setups. This concentration of light output increases the intensity, allowing metal halide lamps to penetrate light to even the very bottom levels of most aquariums. Metal halides are available in many color temperatures, from 6500 K up to 20,000 K, though bulbs as high as 50,000 K are occasionally found. The downsides of metal halide lighting are the initial cost and the heat produced.

Most metal halide fixtures are more expensive than fluorescent systems, but are required for some reef setups. Halide lamps concentrate heat as well as light output. The surface of an operating lamp becomes hot enough to cause second or third degree burns instantly, so this lighting technology must be used with caution. The heat produced can also warm the aquarium to unacceptable levels, possibly necessitating the use of a chiller for certain aquarium setups.

==== LED ====
The most recent addition to the list of aquarium lighting technologies is LED lighting. These have the potential to be much more efficient than any other technology, but are not fully developed. LEDs have the advantage of point source lighting, but are also adjustable to most power levels. This allows for more advanced lighting schedules, the simulation of cloud cover, or even lightning storms. So far, LEDs have found use mainly as lunar lighting in commercial products.

Reef-keeping enthusiasts have begun to build their own LED light fixtures as well. Debate over their effectiveness towards coral is still inconclusive, particularly with respect to their ability to give off UV radiation, critical to obtaining a vibrant array of colors that most people interested in LED lighting are looking for.

LED lighting can be considered one of the most energy efficient and low impact options to lighting a reef tank as well, with a projected life expectancy of seven years. LED lighting also helps replicate the natural look of sunlight because most LED lights produce shimmer lines like the ones found on natural reefs.

The amount of emitters or LED fixtures can vary greatly based on these and other factors; photosynthetic specimens being kept, the input energy lost to heat, the PAR of light at a certain depth of aquarium water, and the light spectrum (PUR) used. Light spectrums that most closely duplicate nature are going to be most efficient. This includes blue light in spectrums approximately from 410 nm to 485 nm along with white (daylight) spectrums from 6500K to 14000K. Warm white emitters with the more yellow and green spectrums should be avoided. The results can be anywhere from .8 watt per gallon to 1.5 watt per gallon of an average depth aquarium.

==== Overall lighting considerations ====
When considering lighting for an aquarium, there are generally two factors to consider: wattage and color temperature. Depending on the type of lighting (i.e. fluorescents, metal halide, etc.) the wattage of light emitted may vary considerably, from tens of watts to several hundred watts in a lighting system. Wattage, while not indicative of color, is equivalent to power and essentially determines how brightly the light will shine. Due to the scattering of light in water, the deeper one's tank is, the more powerful the lighting required. Color temperature, measured in kelvins (albeit slightly unrepresentively) refers to the color of light being emitted by the lamp and is based on the concept of blackbody radiation. Light from the sun has a color temperature of approximately 5900 K and lighting systems with color temperatures >5000 K tend to be best for growing plants in both the marine and freshwater setting. 10,000 K light appears bluish-white and emphasizes coloration in fishes and corals. Higher up on the spectrum there are 14,000 K and 20,000 K bulbs that produce a deep blue tint which mimic the lighting conditions underseas, creating an optimal ambience for invertebrates and livestock present.

=== Temperature control ===
Most marine aquarium inhabitants are endemic to tropical reefs and waters in Africa, Southeast Asia, and the Red Sea. Marine aquarium temperatures should mimic the natural environment of the inhabitants and are most commonly maintained at 23 to 28 °C (73 to 82 °F). In regions where the ambient temperature is less than the desired temperature of the aquarium this generally necessitates the use of an aquarium heater. In some areas where ambient temperature is greater than the desired temperature, or for coldwater systems, refrigeration devices known as "chillers" are used to cool the aquarium water.

=== Water testing ===
Marine aquarists commonly test the water in the aquarium for a variety of chemical indicators of water quality. These include:

- Specific gravity, a relative measure of water density, is normally maintained between 1.020 and 1.024 in aquariums with fish only, and 1.023 and 1.026 for aquariums containing invertebrates.
- Salinity should therefore be between 28 and 35 ppt, with the higher values being beneficial in advanced reef systems. Because salinity is by definition directly related to specific gravity, both can be tested with an inexpensive hydrometer or refractometer.
- pH should be maintained between 8.1 and 8.3.
- Ammonia should be near zero.
- Nitrite should be near zero.
- Nitrate should be well below 10 ppm, but close to zero is best.
- Phosphate should be below 0.3 ppm.
- Alkalinity should be 3.2–4.5 meq/L. or 7 and 12 degrees of carbonate hardness (dKH).
- Copper concentration should be measured and not rise over 0.15 ppm
- Calcium should be around ~ 400 ppm
- Magnesium levels should be ~1250 - 1350 ppm

pH can be raised with a commercially available buffering agent or through calcium-rich substrates. A calibrated calcium reactor can assist in maintaining both pH and alkalinity. Using purified water from a reverse osmosis/deionization (RO/DI) unit can prevent KH and pH fluctuation.

The nitrogen cycle refers to the conversion of toxic ammonia to nitrite and finally nitrate. While fish waste (urine and feces) and decaying matter release ammonia, the majority of ammonia released (approximately 60%) in both marine and freshwater aquariums is excreted directly into the water from the fishes' gills. Biological (bacterial) nitrification converts the ammonia into nitrite ions, NO_{2}-, and then to nitrate ions, NO_{3}-. Nitrate is readily taken up and assimilated by algae and hermatypic corals. Some nitrate is converted via an anaerobic bacterial process to free nitrogen, but this process is very difficult to maintain. In the recent past, most nitrate, which is less toxic to fishes and most invertebrates than nitrites, accumulated in the water until it was physically removed by a water change. However, many marine aquarists are now employing the use of a special section of the tank or separate tank altogether, called a "refugium." A refugium is, as its name suggests, a sheltered area that shares water with the primary, or display, tank. Refugiums usually contain a deep sand bed to allow anoxic zones to develop within them where anaerobic bacteria can convert nitrate into nitrogen gas, a useful means of nitrate removal. Various types of macroalgae can be grown and harvested from the refugium as another means of nitrate export. As refugiums become more common in marine aquaria, nitrate levels are easily manageable for even the novice hobbyist. Ammonia and nitrite should be tested regularly; any detectable levels (i.e., over 0 ppm) can be indicative of a problem. Nitrates should not exceed 2 ppm in reef tanks, or 20 ppm in fish-only tanks. It is sometimes acceptable to have a small amount of nitrate buildup, as some livestock, especially fish, are fairly tolerant of nitrate. Most corals, while able to assimilate nitrate, cannot be expected to survive, much less thrive, with high nitrate concentrations.

Other suggested tests include those for calcium, carbonate alkalinity, magnesium, and other trace elements. It is often beneficial (and necessary) for the aquarist to research the water chemistry parameters for the specific organism that is desired.

=== Acclimation ===
Acclimation is a process that is performed when adding new marine life to an aquarium, particularly for invertebrates, who lack osmoregulation. This process slowly introduces the organisms to the water composition of the new environment, preventing shock resulting from sudden changes in water chemistry. There are several different methods of doing this, including the use of a drip line, or of a measuring cup or other device to slowly mix water from the aquarium tank into a container with the new animal.

The drip line or trickle acclimating method is a safe and gentle way to introduce saltwater fish into a new home, and is a fairly simple one to perform. This procedure can be used to acclimate all types of marine as well as freshwater livestock. First, the fish is placed with all the bag water in a bucket or container of sufficient size for the fish to be reasonably covered with the water, and the bucket is then set on the floor next to the aquarium. Using some plastic air line tubing and an air gang valve, a siphon drip line is set up from the aquarium to the bucket. Tank water is allowed to drip slowly into the bucket, using the gang valve to adjust the drip rate, until the water dripped into the bucket equals about two to three times the original volume of the bag water. After testing the pH, salinity, and temperature of the water in the bucket to see if these parameters match that of the tank water, the fish is gently removed and placed into the tank.

=== Water changes ===
Water changes are a staple of good saltwater maintenance. Larger (approximately 200 US gallons (760 L)) aquariums are much more stable and water changes may not need to take place if the nitrogen cycle has fully established itself in the tank, although this is a controversial statement among aquarists. Water changes are used to maintain balance of calcium, carbonate alkalinity, and magnesium which are rapidly depleted in a reef aquarium, while also maintaining levels of other trace elements as well as removing toxic solutes which may accumulate from many different sources and cannot be removed by even advanced filtration methods. Supplements are needed (such as calcium) when regular water changes alone are not able to maintain adequate levels, particularly those of calcium, carbonate, and magnesium. Water changes involve removing a fraction of the total volume of the aquarium, replacing that water with new pre-mixed saltwater. Pre-mixed saltwater has been dechlorinated and/or dechloraminated—typically with an additive such as bisulfite or through filtering. Water should be brought to the same temperature if more than a 5% change is occurring. Salinity should match that of the aquarium, or be dosed very slowly if altering the salinity. Aging and aerating saltwater (such as in a bucket with a powerhead or airstone) is recommended as good practice to allow the pH to stabilize.

Replacement water should be of the same source as the aquarium, whether it be reverse osmosis (RO), de-ionized (DI), distilled or from a municipal supply, in order to avoid drastic changes in water chemistry. In cases where one is replacing a tap water-based salt mix with a reverse osmosis-based salt mix, the replacement water should be added slowly over the course of several hours to avoid sending the aquarium inhabitants into osmotic shock. However, large water changes are not advised under routine circumstances anyway, so this is really irrelevant. Municipal, or tap water, is not recommended for a marine aquarium as it often contains high levels of nitrates, phosphates, and silicates and other dissolved solids which fuel the growth of nuisance algaes, particularly diatoms, which appear as a rust-colored powdery algae and grows in the overabundance of silicates present in all tap water. Water filtered by a four-stage process including mechanical, carbon, reverse-osmosis, and de-ionizing components is recommended as this can provide the easiest route to absolutely pure water. Four- and five-stage RO/DI filtration units can be obtained for as little as $100 and are a cost-effective means of converting tap water into water usable in a marine aquarium.

== Conservation ==
Almost all species kept in marine aquaria at this time are caught in the wild, although tank-raised specimens are becoming increasingly common as a viable alternative. The list of marine aquarium fish, such as clownfish that are captive-bred and available on a commercial scale, is increasing. As of a 2019 report, there were nearly 400 known captive-bred species, 46 that were considered commonly available. Much collecting is done in Indonesia and the Philippines, where use of cyanide and other destructive collection methods, while discouraged, is unfortunately common. The majority of live rock is also harvested in the wild, and recent restrictions on this harvest in Florida have caused a shift to Fijian and aquacultured rock. Natural rock, because it is created by coral polyps, takes many years if not centuries to form, and is a vital habitat for countless marine species; thus, commercial-scale harvesting of naturally occurring live rock has been criticized by conservationists. Additionally, many animal species sold to hobbyists have very specific dietary and habitat requirements that cannot be met by hobbyists (e.g. genus Labroides wrasses, the moorish idol); these animals almost inevitably die quickly and have markedly reduced lifespans compared to wild specimens. Often these specific environmental requirements cause improperly housed livestock's color and appearance to be poor. These issues are often downplayed by individuals and organizations with a financial interest in the trade. Hobbyists who support conservation should buy only certified net-caught fish (although ensuring the legitimacy of such claims can be difficult) or captive-raised fish, as well as farmed corals and to support legitimate reef conservation efforts. The majority of corals can be "fragged", whereby a portion of a larger captive coral is separated and can subsequently be raised into an individual specimen, allowing for coral propagation within the domestic aquarium; the trade in frags (i.e. fragments) offers a fantastic opportunity for marine aquarists to obtain new and unique corals while limiting the impact on the natural environment. Rare species and those without a history of being successfully kept in captivity should be avoided.

=== Commercial development ===
Various businesses have commercialized fishkeeping. With the advent of large scale business operations focusing on breeding massive quantities of specimens, marine fishkeeping has become much more widespread than ever before. Perhaps the biggest disincentive to marine fishkeeping, in comparison to freshwater, is the initial setup cost. A 100 US gallons (380 L) reef tank full of coral and equipment can cost in excess of $2,500 US, although a budget-minded home hobbyist could spend less than half of this and still get a satisfactory result.
