= Pterocladiophilaceae =

Scientific classification
- Domain: Eukaryota
- Clade: Archaeplastida
- Division: Rhodophyta
- Class: Florideophyceae
- Order: Gracilariales
- Family: Pterocladiophilaceae; Kung Chu Fan & George F. Papenfuss 1959: 38

Family of algae

The Pterocladiophilaceae is a small family of red algae containing 2 (or 3) genera of thallus parasitic algae.

== Taxonomy ==
The family Pterocladiophilaceae was originally established by Fan & Papenfuss (1959: 38) to accommodate their newly named genus and species, Pterocladiophila hemisphaerica, a parasite on Pterocladia lucida (R. Brown ex Turner) J. Agardh in New Zealand. This parastitic alga, which differs from all other parasitic red algae in having zonately divided tetrasporangia, was tentatively assigned to the Cryptonemiales. Fredericq & Hommersand (1990a), as an outgrowth of their detailed morphological study of Holmsella pachyderma (Reinsch) Sturch, a parasite algae feeding on Gracilaria and Gracilariopsis in Great Britain and Ireland that had been assigned to the Choreocolacaceae family, noted that it had a lot of similarities among Holmsella Sturch, Gelidiocolax Gardner, and Pterocladiophila. These various similarities include the pattern of vegetative cell division, catenate (chain-like) spermatangia, two-celled carpogonial branch, and the apparent absence of an auxiliary cell. Fredericq & Hommersand grouped these three genera in the Pterocladiophilaceae family, arguing that the cruciate division of tetrasporangia in Gelidiocolax and Holmsella was not a serious objection to uniting these genera with Pterocladiophila. Moreover, on the basis of certain features of spermatangial initiation, gonimoblast development, and the pattern of concavo-convex divisions of apical and cortical cells, they assigned the family to the Gracilariales.

Pterocladiophila hemisphaerica K.-C.Fan & Papenfuss has shown due to Dna analysis, to be within the Ceramiales order, but the parasite was grouped with support as sister to the Gracilariales order.

== Genera ==
As accepted by GBIF;

- Gelidiocolax N.L.Gardner, 1927 (2)
- Holmsella Sturch, 1926 (2)

Figures in brackets are approx. how many species per genus.

Note, Pterocladiophila K.-C.Fan & Papenfuss, 1959 is not accepted as a species by the GBIF. It has a sole species Pterocladiophila hemisphaerica K.-C.Fan & Papenfuss, that was originally described from New Zealand, and has also been recorded from the Caribbean (Stegenga and Vroman 1986). The species is accepted by AlgaeBase, and WoRMS.

== Description and ecology ==
They feed on members of the Gelidiaceae family or Gracilaria species of algae, forming small, white to pigmented, hemispherical to verrucose, pustules (raised structure containing necrotic inflammatory cells). They basally penetrate the tissue of the host and protrude above the host's surface.

They are minute, generally more or less spherical (in shape), They have an internal structure of branched, endophytic, rhizoidal filaments pit-connected to host cells, and the pustules of outer, anticlinal, cortical chains and inner larger-celled, multinucleate, medullary cells with numerous secondary pit-connections.

Reproduction is carried out by Gametangial thalli dioecious. The Carpogonial branches (female parts) are 2-celled, borne on a supporting cell in a cortical filament, with a straight trichogyne (slender, hair-like cell which receives the fertilizing particles). The auxiliary cells are absent; fertilized carpogonium possibly fusing with adjacent vegetative cells and developing the gonimoblast directly, consisting of horizontal filaments fusing with vegetative cells and clusters of erect filaments bearing chains of carposporangia, interspersed among cortical filaments; pericarp absent. Spermatangia formed in chains from surface cortical cells, cut off by intercalary divisions from initial cells.

Tetrasporangia scattered in the cortex or in pits, cruciately or zonately divided. The spermatangia are produced in chains, cut off transversely at upper end of spermatangial parent cell.

== Other sources ==
- Fredericq, S. & Hommersand, M.H. (1990a). Morphology and systematics of Holmsella pachyderma (Pterocladiophilaceae, Gracilariales). Br. phycol. J. 25, 39–51.
