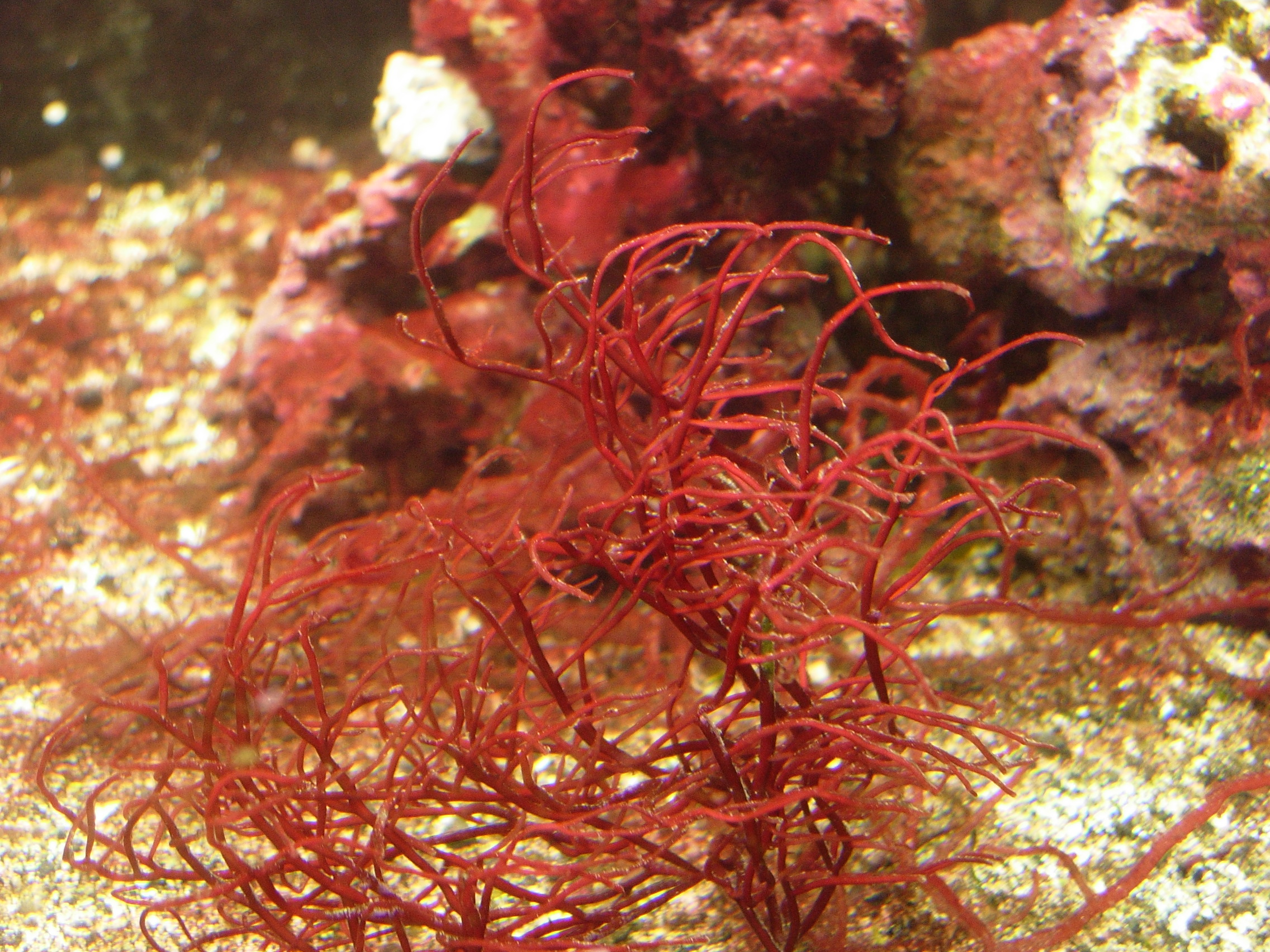

Scientific classification
- Domain: Eukaryota
- Clade: Archaeplastida
- Division: Rhodophyta
- Class: Florideophyceae
- Order: Gracilariales
- Family: Gracilariaceae
- Genus: Gracilaria; Greville, 1830

Species
- see text

= Gracilaria =

Genus of seaweeds

Gracilaria, also known as Irish moss or ogonori, is a genus of red algae in the family Gracilariaceae. It is notable for its economic importance as an agarophyte meaning that it is used to make agar, as well as its use as a food for humans and various species of shellfish. Various species in the genus are cultivated among Asia, South America, Africa and Oceania. They produce over 90% of the world's agar.

== Taxonomy ==
Gracilaria contains the following subtaxa:

- Gracilaria abbottiana M.D.Hoyle
- Gracilaria abyssalis Gurgel & Yoneshigue-Valentin
- Gracilaria aculeata (Hering) Papenfuss
- Gracilaria aggregata Hooker f. & Harvey
- Gracilaria ambigua Greville
- Gracilaria apiculata P.Crouan & H.Crouan
  - Gracilaria apiculata subsp. candelabriformis Gurgel, Fredericq & J.N.Norris
- Gracilaria apiculifera J.Agardh
  - Gracilaria arcuata f. rhizophora Børgesen
  - Gracilaria arcuata var. attenuata Umamaheswara Rao
  - Gracilaria arcuata var. snackeyi Weber Bosse
- Gracilaria arcuata Zanardini
- Gracilaria armata (C.Agardh) Greville
- Gracilaria articulata C.F.Chang & B.M.Xia
- Gracilaria ascidiicola E.Y.Dawson
- Gracilaria attenuata (M.Umamaheswara Rao) V.Krishnamurthy
- Gracilaria austromaritima Przhemenstskaya
- Gracilaria babae (H.Yamamoto) P.-K. Ng, P.-E. Lim & S.-M. Phang
- Gracilaria baiana Lyra, Gurgel, M.C.Oliveira & Nunes
- Gracilaria beckeri (J.Agardh) Papenfuss
- Gracilaria birdiae E.M.Plastino & E.C.Oliveira
- Gracilaria blodgettii Harvey
- Gracilaria brasiliensis Gurgel & Yoneshigue-Valentin
- Gracilaria brevis W.R.Taylor
- Gracilaria bursa-pastoris (S.G.Gmelin) P.C.Silva
- Gracilaria camerunensis Pilger
- Gracilaria canaliculata Sonder
- Gracilaria capensis F.Schmitz ex Mazza
- Gracilaria capitata Zanardini
- Gracilaria cearensis (A.B.Joly & Pinheiro) A.B.Joly & Pinheiro
- Gracilaria cerrosiana W.R.Taylor
- Gracilaria cervicornis (Turner) J.Agardh
- Gracilaria changii (B.M.Xia & I.A.Abbott) I.A.Abbott, J.Zhang & B.M.Xia
- Gracilaria chilensis C.J.Bird, McLachlan & E.C.Oliveira
- Gracilaria chondracantha (Kützing) A.J.K.Millar
- Gracilaria chondroides (Kützing) P.Crouan & H.Crouan
  - Gracilaria chorda var. exilis Yamamoto
- Gracilaria chouae Zhang & B.M.Xia
- Gracilaria cliftonii Withell, A.J.K.Millar & Kraft
- Gracilaria comosa Withell, A.J.K.Millar & Kraft
  - Gracilaria compressa var. lyra J.Agardh
- Gracilaria conferta (Schousboe ex Montagne) Montagne
  - Gracilaria confervoides f. ecortica V.M.May
  - Gracilaria confervoides var. ramulosa Kützing
- Gracilaria coppejansii Muangmai, Lewmanomont, Prathep, Terada & Zuccarello
- Gracilaria corallicola Zanardini
- Gracilaria cornea J.Agardh
- Gracilaria corniculata (C.Agardh) J.Agardh
- Gracilaria coronopifolia J.Agardh
- Gracilaria corticata (J.Agardh) J.Agardh
  - Gracilaria corticata var. cylindrica Umamaheswara Rao
  - Gracilaria corticata var. linearis J.Agardh
  - Gracilaria corticata var. ramalinioides J.Agardh
- Gracilaria corymbiata (N.Rodríguez de Rios) E.K.Ganesan
  - Gracilaria crassa f. conglomerata Børgesen
- Gracilaria crassissima (P.Crouan & H.Crouan) P.Crouan & H.Crouan
- Gracilaria crispata Setchell & Gardner
- Gracilaria crockeri E.Y.Dawson
- Gracilaria cuneata Areschoug
- Gracilaria cuneifolia (Okamura) I.K.Lee & Kurogi
- Gracilaria curtissiae J.Agardh
- Gracilaria cylindrica Børgesen
- Gracilaria damicornis J.Agardh
- Gracilaria dawsonii Hoyle
- Gracilaria debilis (Forsskål) Børgesen
- Gracilaria dendroides Gargiulo, De Masi & Tripodi
- Gracilaria denticulata F.Schmitz ex Mazza
- Gracilaria disputabilis (M.Bodard) M.Bodard
- Gracilaria disticha (J.Agardh) J.Agardh
- Gracilaria divaricata Harvey
- Gracilaria divergens (C.Agardh) J.Agardh
- Gracilaria domingensis (Kützing) Sonder ex Dickie
- Gracilaria dotyi Hoyle
- Gracilaria dumosa Harvey & Bailey
- Gracilaria dura (C.Agardh) J.Agardh
  - Gracilaria dura f. prolificans Reinbold
  - Gracilaria dura var. fruticosa J.Agardh
- Gracilaria ecuadoreana (W.R.Taylor) E.Y.Dawson
- Gracilaria edulis (S.G.Gmelin) P.C.Silva
- Gracilaria ephemera Skelton, G.R.South & A.J.K.Millar
- Gracilaria epihippisora Hoyle
- Gracilaria excavata (Setchell & Gardner) G.M.Lyra, C.Iha, M.C. Oliveira, J.M.C.Nunes
- Gracilaria falconii Ardito, Núñez-Resendiz, Dreckmann & Sentíes
- Gracilaria fanii B.M.Xia & Pan
- Gracilaria ferox J.Agardh
- Gracilaria firma C.F.Chang & B.-M.Xia
- Gracilaria fisheri (B.M.Xia & I.A.Abbott) I.A.Abbott, J.Zhang & B.M.Xia
- Gracilaria flabelliformis (P.Crouan & H.Crouan) Fredericq & Gurgel
  - Gracilaria flabelliformis subsp. aionana Gurgel, Fredericq & J.N.Norris
  - Gracilaria flabelliformis subsp. simplex Gurgel, Fredericq & J.N.Norris
- Gracilaria flagelliformis (Sonder) Womersley
- Gracilaria flexuosa E.M.Holmes
- Gracilaria foliifera (Forsskål) Børgesen
  - Gracilaria foliifera f. granatea (J.V.Lamouroux) Børgesen
- Gracilaria fruticosa Harvey
- Gracilaria galetensis Gurgel, Fredericq, & J.N.Norris
- Gracilaria gardneri (Setchell) Gurgel, J.N.Norris & Fredericq
- Gracilaria gigartinoides (P.Crouan & H.Crouan) P.Crouan & H.Crouan
- Gracilaria gigas Harvey
- Gracilaria glomerata Zhang & B.M.Xia
- Gracilaria gracilis (Stackhouse) Steentoft, L.M.Irvine & Farnham
- Gracilaria gurgelii Freshwater
- Gracilaria hainanensis C.F.Chang & B.M.Xia
- Gracilaria halogenea A.J.K.Millar
- Gracilaria hancockii E.Y.Dawson
- Gracilaria hauckii P.C.Silva
- Gracilaria hayi Gurgel, Fredericq & J.N.Norris
- Gracilaria hermonii Millar
- Gracilaria heteroclada (Montagne) J.Feldmann & G.Feldmann
- Gracilaria hikkaduwensis Durairatnam
- Gracilaria howensis A.H.S.Lucas
- Gracilaria huangii S.-M.Lin & De Clerck
- Gracilaria hummii Hommersand & Freshwater
- Gracilaria incrustata J.Agardh
- Gracilaria incurvata Okamura
- Gracilaria indica M.Umamaheswara Rao
- Gracilaria intermedia J.Agardh
  - Gracilaria intermedia subsp. ganesanana Gurgel, Fredericq & J.Norris
- Gracilaria isabellana Gurgel, Fredericq & J.N.Norris
- Gracilaria kanyakumariensis Umamaheswara Rao
- Gracilaria khanjanapajiae Saengkaew, Muangmai & Zuccarello
- Gracilaria kilakkaraiensis V.Krishnamurthy & Rajendran
- Gracilaria lacerata Setchell & N.L.Gardner
- Gracilaria lantaensis Muangmai, Zuccarello, Noiraksa & Lewmanomont
- Gracilaria latifrons P.Crouan & H.Crouan
- Gracilaria longa Gargiulo, De Masi & Tripodi
- Gracilaria longirostris Zhang & Wang
- Gracilaria mammillaris (Montagne) M.Howe
- Gracilaria manilaensis Yamamoto & Trono
- Gracilaria mannarensis Umamaheswara Rao
- Gracilaria maramae G.R.South
- Gracilaria marcialana E.Y.Dawson
- Gracilaria mayae A.J.K.Millar
- Gracilaria megaspora (E.Y.Dawson) Papenfuss
- Gracilaria mexicana (Kützing) P.Crouan & H.Crouan
- Gracilaria microcarpa Dreckmann, Núñez-Resendiz & Sentíes
- Gracilaria microdendron J.Agardh
- Gracilaria millardetii (Montagne) J.Agardh
  - Gracilaria millardetii f. crenulata J.Agardh
  - Gracilaria millardetii f. exposita Børgesen
  - Gracilaria millardetii f. latifolia Børgesen
  - Gracilaria millardetii f. linearifolia J.Agardh
- Gracilaria minor (Sonder) Durairatnam
- Gracilaria minuta Lewmanomont
- Gracilaria mixta I.A.Abbott, J.Zhang & B.M.Xia
- Gracilaria multifurcata Børgesen
- Gracilaria multipartita (Clemente) Harvey
  - Gracilaria multipartita f. prolifera E.S.Sinova
  - Gracilaria multipartita f. supernediliatata E.S.Sinova
  - Gracilaria multipartita var. crispa (Clemente) Cremades
  - Gracilaria multipartita var. elongata (Clemente) Cremades
- Gracilaria occidentalis (Børgesen) M.Bodard
- Gracilaria oliveirarum Gurgel, Fredericq & J.N.Norris
- Gracilaria opuntia Durairatnam
- Gracilaria ornata Areschoug
- Gracilaria pachydermatica Setchell & N.L.Gardner
- Gracilaria pacifica I.A.Abbott
- Gracilaria palmettoides P.Crouan & H.Crouan
- Gracilaria papenfussii I.A.Abbott
- Gracilaria parva Freshwater, B.Williamson, P.W.Gabrielson & Margarita Brandt
- Gracilaria parvispora I.A.Abbott
- Gracilaria patens P.Crouan & H.Crouan
- Gracilaria pauciramosa (N.Rodríguez de Ríos) A.M.Bellorin, M.C.Oliveira, & E.C.Oliveira
- Gracilaria percurrens (I.A.Abbott) I.A.Abbott
- Gracilaria perplexa K.Byrne & Zuccarello
- Gracilaria peruana Piccone & Grunow
- Gracilaria phuquocensis N.H.Le, N.Muangmai & G.C.Zuccarello
- Gracilaria pinnata Setchell & N.L.Gardner
- Gracilaria preissiana (Sonder) Womersley
- Gracilaria prolifica (Kützing) P.Crouan & H.Crouan
- Gracilaria protea J.Agardh
- Gracilaria pudumadamensis V.Krishnamurthy & N.R.Rajendran
- Gracilaria pulvinata Skottsberg
- Gracilaria punctata (Okamura) Yamada
- Gracilaria pygmaea Børgesen
- Gracilaria ramisecunda E.Y.Dawson
- Gracilaria ramulosa (Martius) Greville
- Gracilaria rangiferina (Kützing) Piccone
- Gracilaria reptans (Weber Bosse) P.C.Silva
- Gracilaria rhodocaudata Yamamoto & Kudo
- Gracilaria rhodymenioides A.J.K.Millar
- Gracilaria robusta Setchell
- Gracilaria rubra C.F.Chang & B.M.Xia
- Gracilaria rubrimembra E.Y.Dawson
- Gracilaria salicornia (C.Agardh) E.Y.Dawson
- Gracilaria salzmannii Bornet ex Möbius
- Gracilaria secunda (C.Agardh) Zanardini
- Gracilaria secundata Harvey
- Gracilaria secundata Setchell & N.L.Gardner
- Gracilaria shimodensis Terada, R.& Yamamoto, H.
- Gracilaria silviae Lyra, Gurgel, M.C.Oliveira & J.M.C.Nunes
- Gracilaria skottsbergii W.R.Taylor
- Gracilaria spinigera E.Y.Dawson
- Gracilaria spinuligera Børgesen
- Gracilaria spinulosa (Okamura) Chang & B.-M.Xia
- Gracilaria srilankia (C.F.Chang & B.M.Xia) A.F.Withell, A.J.K.Millar & Kraft
- Gracilaria stellata I.A.Abbott, Zhang & B.M.Xia
- Gracilaria stipitata A.F.Withell, A.J.K.Millar & Kraft
- Gracilaria sublittoralis Yamada & Segawa ex H.Yamamoto
- Gracilaria subsecundata Setchell & N.L.Gardner
- Gracilaria subtilis (B.M.Xia & I.A.Abbott) B.M.Xia & I.A.Abbott
- Gracilaria sullivanii Yamamoto & Trono
- Gracilaria suzanneae L.P.Soares, C.F.D.Gurgel & M.T.Fujii
- Gracilaria symmetrica E.Y.Dawson
- Gracilaria taiwanensis S.-M.Lin, L.-C.Liu & Payri
- Gracilaria tenuissima Croaun & Crouan
- Gracilaria tenuistipitata C.F.Chang & B.-M.Xia
  - Gracilaria tenuistipitata var. liui Zhang & Xia
  - Gracilaria tenuistipitata var. tenuistipitata C.F.Chang & B.M.Xia
- Gracilaria tepocensis (E.Y.Dawson) E.Y.Dawson
- Gracilaria textorii (Suringar) Hariot
  - Gracilaria textorii f. tenuis V.May
  - Gracilaria textorii var. cunninghamii (Farlow) E.Y.Dawson
- Gracilaria tikvahiae McLachlan
- Gracilaria transtasmanica (M.Preuss, N.Muangmai and Zuccarello) G. M.Lyra, C.Iha, J.M.C.Nunes, C.C.Davis
- Gracilaria tridactylites P.Crouan & H.Crouan ex J.Agardh
- Gracilaria truncata Kraft
- Gracilaria tsudae (I.A.Abbott & I.Meneses) I.A.Abbott
- Gracilaria tuberculosa (Hampe ex Kützing) J.Agardh
- Gracilaria turgida E.Y.Dawson
- Gracilaria tuticorinensis V.Krishnamurthy & Rajendran
- Gracilaria urvillei (Montagne) I.A.Abbott
- Gracilaria usneoides (C.Agardh) J.Agardh
  - Gracilaria usneoides var. succosa J.Agardh
- Gracilaria vanbosseae (I.A.Abbott) I.A.Abbott
- Gracilaria veloroae E.Y.Dawson
- Gracilaria venezuelensis W.R.Taylor
- Gracilaria vermiculata P.J.L.Dangeard
- Gracilaria vermiculophylla (Ohmi) Papenfuss
  - Gracilaria vermiculophylla var. zhengii (J.F.Zhang & B.M.Xia) Yoshida
  - Gracilaria verrucosa var. procerrima (Esper) M.P.Reis
  - Gracilaria verrucosa var. ramulosa (C.Agardh) M.P.Reis
- Gracilaria vieillardii P.C.Silva
- Gracilaria vieirae M.P.Reis
- Gracilaria viridis A.Sfriso, M.A.Wolf, K.Sciuto, M.Morabito, C.Andreoli & I.Moro
- Gracilaria vivesii M.Howe
- Gracilaria webervanbosseae Huisman & G.W.Saunders
- Gracilaria wrightii (Turner) J.Agardh
- Gracilaria xiae-abbotii G.M.Lyra, J.M.C.Nunes & C.C.Davis
- Gracilaria yamamotoi Zhang & B.M.Xia
- Gracilaria yinggehaiensis Xia & Wang
- Gracilaria yoneshigueana Gurgel, Fredericq & J.N.Norris S

== Distribution ==
Gracilaria are found in warm waters throughout the world, though they also occur seasonally in temperate waters. It can not tolerate temperatures below 10 °C (50 °F). Gracilaria are found in all oceans except the Arctic. Their center of diversity is the Western Pacific, where they have been traditionally cultivated as a source of agar.

== Use ==
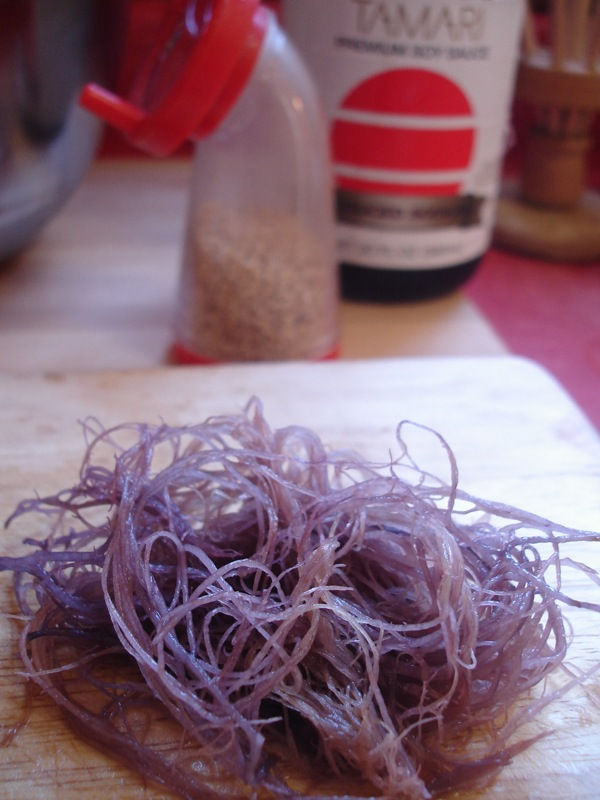
Ogonori

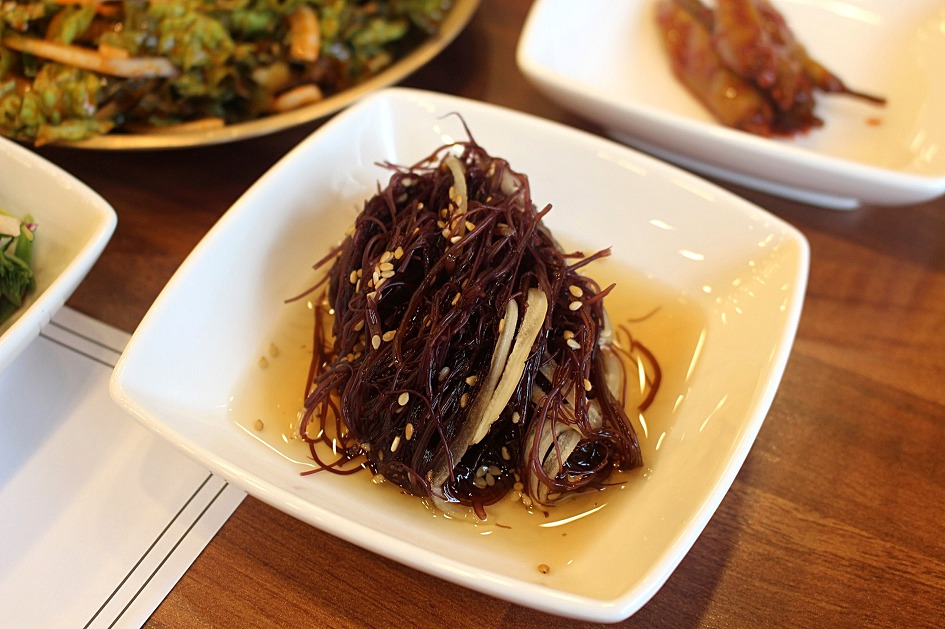
Kkosiraegi-muchim (seasoned gracilaria)

Gracilaria is used as a food in Filipino, Hawaiian, Japanese, Korean and Sri Lankan cuisines. In Japanese cuisine, it is called ogonori or ogo, and used to make tokoroten. In the Philippines, it is called gulaman and used to make a gelatin substitute. In Jamaica, it is known as Irish moss. In Korea, it is known as kkosiraegi.

Gracilaria oligosaccharides with degree of polymerization 6 prepared by agarase digestion from agar-bearing Gracilaria sp. polysaccharides have been shown to be an effective prophylactic agent during in vitro and in vivo experiments against Japanese encephalitis viral infection. The sulfated oligosaccharides from Gracilaria sp. seem to be promising candidates for further development as antiviral agents.

In the Philippines, Gracilaria have been harvested and used as food for centuries, eaten both fresh or sun-dried and turned into jellies. The earliest historical attestation is from the Vocabulario de la lengua tagala (1754) by the Jesuit priests Juan de Noceda and Pedro de Sanlucar, where golaman or gulaman was defined as "una yerva, de que se haze conserva a modo de Halea, naze en la mar" ("an herb, from which a jam-like preserve is made, grows in the sea"), with an additional entry for guinolaman to refer to food made with the jelly.

In Japan, Gracilaria has been used to produce funori (府海苔), an agar-based glue, since the 17th century.

In Sri Lanka, Gracilaria has been used to make a seaweed soup that also incorporates coconut cream and lime. It is also used to create seaweed jelly, a local sweetmeat in the Puttalam District of northwestern Sri Lanka.

Irish moss has long been used as a clarifying agent during the brewing of beer, especially among home brewers, as an alternative to mechanical filtering.

Gracilaria tikvahiae has been used as a model species to determine how well seaweed could be used as a resilient food in sun-blocking scenarios like nuclear winter.

== Aquarium trade ==
Gracilaria commonly appears as a macroalgae for sale in the aquarium trade. It is highly palatable to tangs and many other herbivorous fish, and its nutrient uptake ability makes it a suitable choice for a refugium.

== Ecology ==
Gracilaria are susceptible to infection by the parasitic oomycete Pythium porphyrae. Reproduction by Gracilaria gracilis is supported by Idotea balthica – the first known case of an animal helping algae reproduce.
