= Aquarium heater =

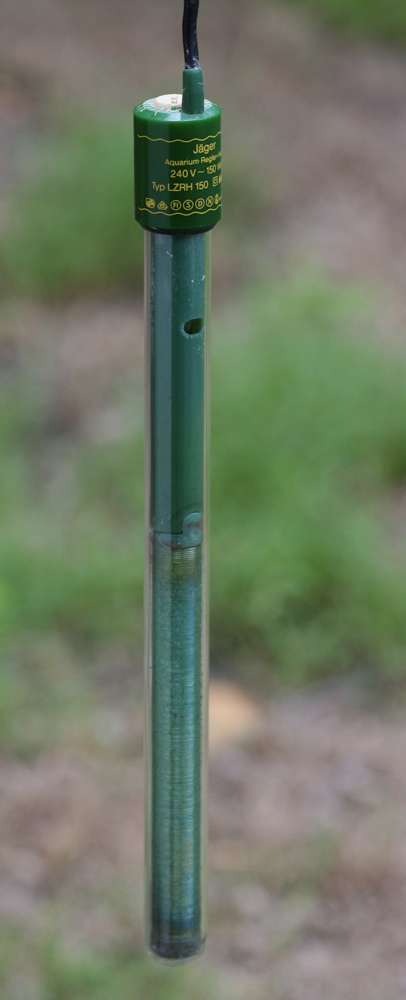
A typical glass-tube immersion style aquarium heater

An aquarium heater is a device used in the fishkeeping hobby to warm the temperature of water in aquariums. Most tropical freshwater and marine aquariums are maintained at temperatures that range from 22 to 30 °C (72 to 86 °F). The types include glass immersion heaters and undergravel heating. There are also heating mats that may be placed under the aquarium.

== Glass immersion heaters ==
Most commonly, aquarium heaters are immersion style heaters, these heaters consist of a glass tube containing a heating element wound around a ceramic or glass insert. Some glass immersion heaters also contain sand, and most, but not all, are fully submersible. The glass tube also contains an adjustable thermostat which turns the heating element on to maintain the required temperature. This thermostat is often a bimetallic strip; because the strip contains two metals, the metals will expand at different rates when the temperature rises, causing the strip to bend. This strip carries the current, but breaks the current at the correct temperature. The setting of this bimetallic strip can be adjusted. More advanced thermostats may use microchip technology. A small light in the heater is often included to indicate operation.

In a small aquarium, one heater can be used; however, in a larger aquarium, two or more may be used. This has the added advantage of one heater being able to compensate in the event of one heater malfunctioning.

== Undergravel heating ==
Heating of the aquarium can also be achieved via a heating element in the form of a flexible heating cable that is buried beneath the aquarium substrate. Undergravel cable heating is popular in heavily planted aquariums.

== Undertank heating ==
Aquaria can also be heated by the use of heating mats which are placed beneath aquaria. Glass is, however, a poor conductor of heat and thus reduces the efficiency of this method of heating.

== See also ==
- Aquarium
- Fishkeeping
