= Carbonate hardness =

Measure of water hardness

Carbonate hardness, is a measure of the water hardness caused by the presence of carbonate (CO^{2−}_{3}) and bicarbonate (HCO^{−}_{3}) anions. Carbonate hardness is usually expressed either in degrees KH (dKH) (from the German "Karbonathärte"), or in parts per million calcium carbonate ( ppm CaCO_{3} or grams CaCO_{3} per litre|mg/L). One dKH is equal to 17.848 mg/L (ppm) CaCO_{3}, e.g. one dKH corresponds to the carbonate and bicarbonate ions found in a solution of approximately 17.848 milligrams of calcium carbonate(CaCO_{3}) per litre of water (17.848 ppm). Both measurements (mg/L or KH) are usually expressed as mg/L CaCO_{3} – meaning the concentration of carbonate expressed as if calcium carbonate were the sole source of carbonate ions.

An aqueous solution containing 120 mg NaHCO_{3} (baking soda) per litre of water will contain 1.4285 mmol/l of bicarbonate, since the molar mass of baking soda is 84.007 g/mol. This is equivalent in carbonate hardness to a solution containing 0.71423 mmol/L of (calcium) carbonate, or 71.485 mg/L of calcium carbonate (molar mass 100.09 g/mol). Since one degree KH = 17.848 mg/L CaCO_{3}, this solution has a KH of 4.0052 degrees.

Carbonate hardness should not be confused with a similar measure Carbonate Alkalinity which is expressed in either [milli[equivalent]s] per litre (meq/L) or ppm. Carbonate hardness expressed in ppm does not necessarily equal carbonate alkalinity expressed in ppm.

$\text{Carbonate Alkalinity CA (mg/L)} = [\text{HCO}_3^-] + 2\times[\text{CO}_3^{2-}]$ whereas

$\text{Carbonate Hardness CH (mg/L)} = [\text{HCO}_3^-] + [\text{CO}_3^{2-}]$

However, for water with a pH below 8.5, the CO^{2−}_{3} will be less than 1% of the HCO^{−}_{3} so carbonate alkalinity will equal carbonate hardness to within an error of less than 1%.

In a solution where only CO_{2} affects the pH, carbonate hardness can be used to calculate the concentration of dissolved CO_{2} in the solution with the formula

[CO_{2}] = 3 × KH × 10^{7 − pH},

where KH is degrees of carbonate hardness and [CO_{2}] is given in ppm by weight.

The term carbonate hardness is also sometimes used as a synonym for temporary hardness, in which case it refers to that portion of hard water that can be removed by processes such as boiling or lime softening, and then separation of water from the resulting precipitate.

== See also ==
- dGH or DGH or Degree of General Hardness, a measure of the hardness of water
- Hard water
