= DKH =

Degrees of German carbonate hardness (°dKH or °KH; the dKH is from the German deutsche Karbonathärte) is a unit of water hardness, specifically for temporary or carbonate hardness. Carbonate hardness is a measure of the concentration of carbonates such as calcium carbonate (CaCO_{3}) and magnesium carbonate (MgCO_{3}) per volume of water. As a unit 1 dKH is the same as 1 °dH which is equal to approximately 0.1786 mmol/L or 10.02 milligrams (mg) of calcium oxide per litre of water, i.e. 17.86 ppm.

The measurements of total hardness (German Gesamthärte (GH)) and carbonate hardness (German Karbonathärte (KH)) are sometimes stated with units dKH and dGH to differentiate them from one another, although in both cases the unit they are measured in is German degrees (°dH).

== See also ==
- Carbonate hardness
- Hard water
- dGH
