= Refugium (fishkeeping) =

Protected extension to a fish tank that shares the same water supply

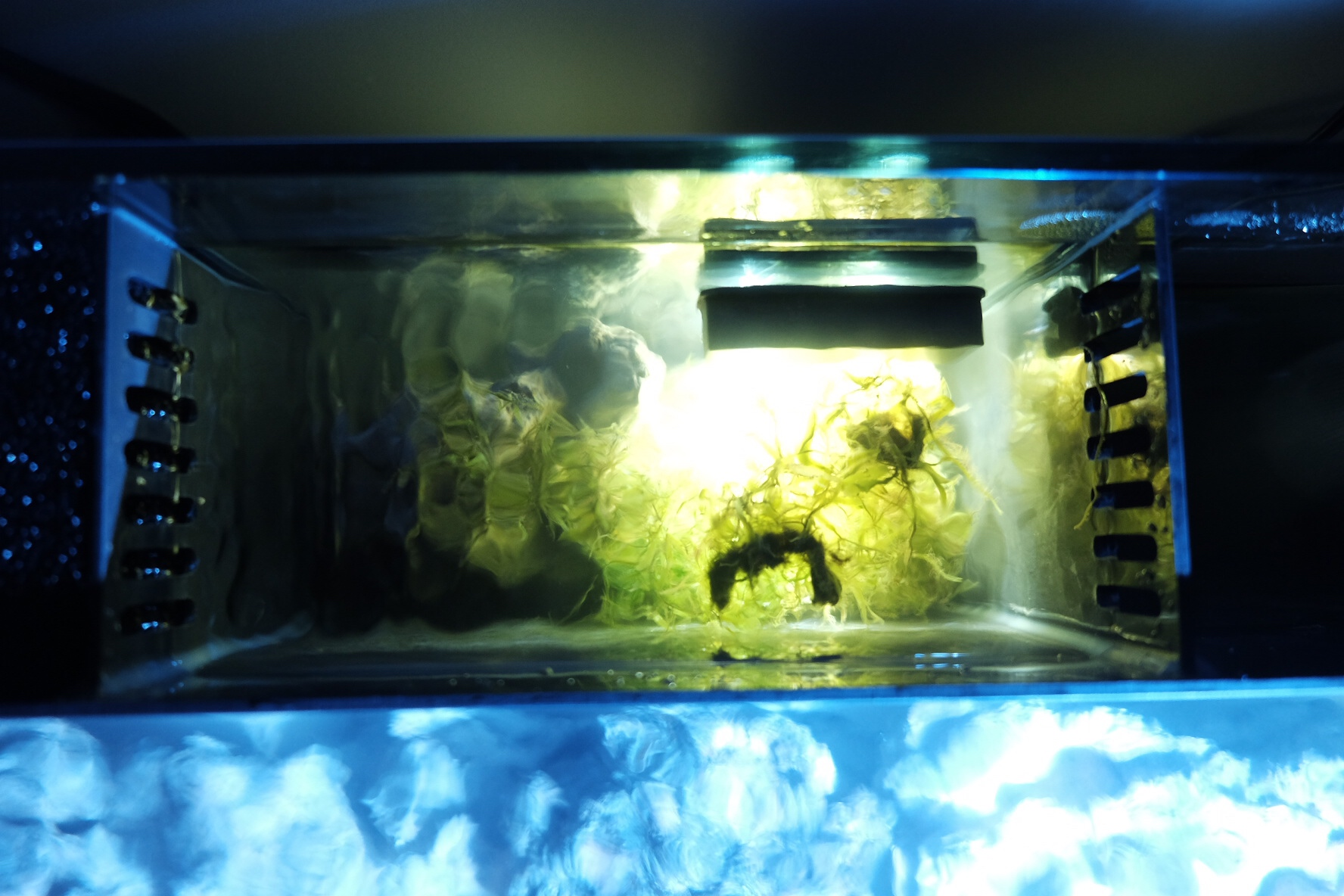
A refugium in an all-in-one aquarium.

In fishkeeping, a refugium is an appendage to a marine, brackish, or freshwater fish tank that shares the same water supply. It is a separate sump, connected to the main show tank. It is a "refugium" in the sense that it permits organisms to be maintained that would not survive in the main system, whether food animals, anaerobic denitrifying bacteria, or photosynthesizers. For some applications water flow is limited in order to protect plants or animals that require slow flow. The refugium light cycle can be operated opposite to the main tank, in order to keep total system pH more stable (due to the uptake of acid-forming CO_{2} by photosynthesis occurring in the refugium during its "daylight" hours). One volume guideline for a refugium is 1:10 main tank volume.

A refugium may be used for one or more purposes such as denitrification, nutrient export, plankton production, circulation, surface agitation to improve oxygen exchange with the atmosphere or even aesthetic purposes.

== Construction ==
Tropical marine refugiums often contain live rock and live sand, macroalgae, and sometimes scavenger microfauna such as micro brittle stars, tiny sea stars such as Asterina, snails, and worms. To achieve maximum biological filtration through uptake of nutrients by macroalgae/mangroves, strong lighting is often utilized in the refugium. In this fashion, macroalgae algae growth is encouraged, competing with nuisance algae which would otherwise thrive in the main/display tank. Some also use refugiums to raise tiny brine shrimp, mysis shrimp, ostracods, amphipods, copepods and isopods for delicate fish like seahorses and dragonets to feed on. A sump is an additional tank often kept under the display tank that serves to house filtration and other miscellaneous equipment such as protein skimmers, reaction chambers, hoses, heaters and the like. This is especially common for show tanks and reef tanks. In addition to housing critical equipment, the sump serves to add volume to the total system; mitigating the effects of nutrient buildup or unintentional introduction of foreign substances.

Tropical freshwater refugiums often contain large amounts of aquarium plants, primarily Vallisneria, Anubias, Cabomba, Echinodorus, Microsorum, Cladophora, Java moss and Fontinalis, but like marine tanks they often contain scavengers such as several species of prolific snails which are often Malaysian trumpet snails, Ramshorn snails and Physa and prolific shrimp such as cherry shrimp. Some use refugiums to raise microfauna Daphnia, Moina and Gammarus to supplement the diets of the fish in the main tank, particularly fish that are picky about their diet, such as freshwater pipefish.

In home aquariums, the refugium is typically located in the cabinet underneath the main tank. By confining the plants and creatures to the refugium, the main tank remains clean and aesthetically pleasing, while the biological filtration takes place in the refugium.

== See also ==
- Algae scrubber
