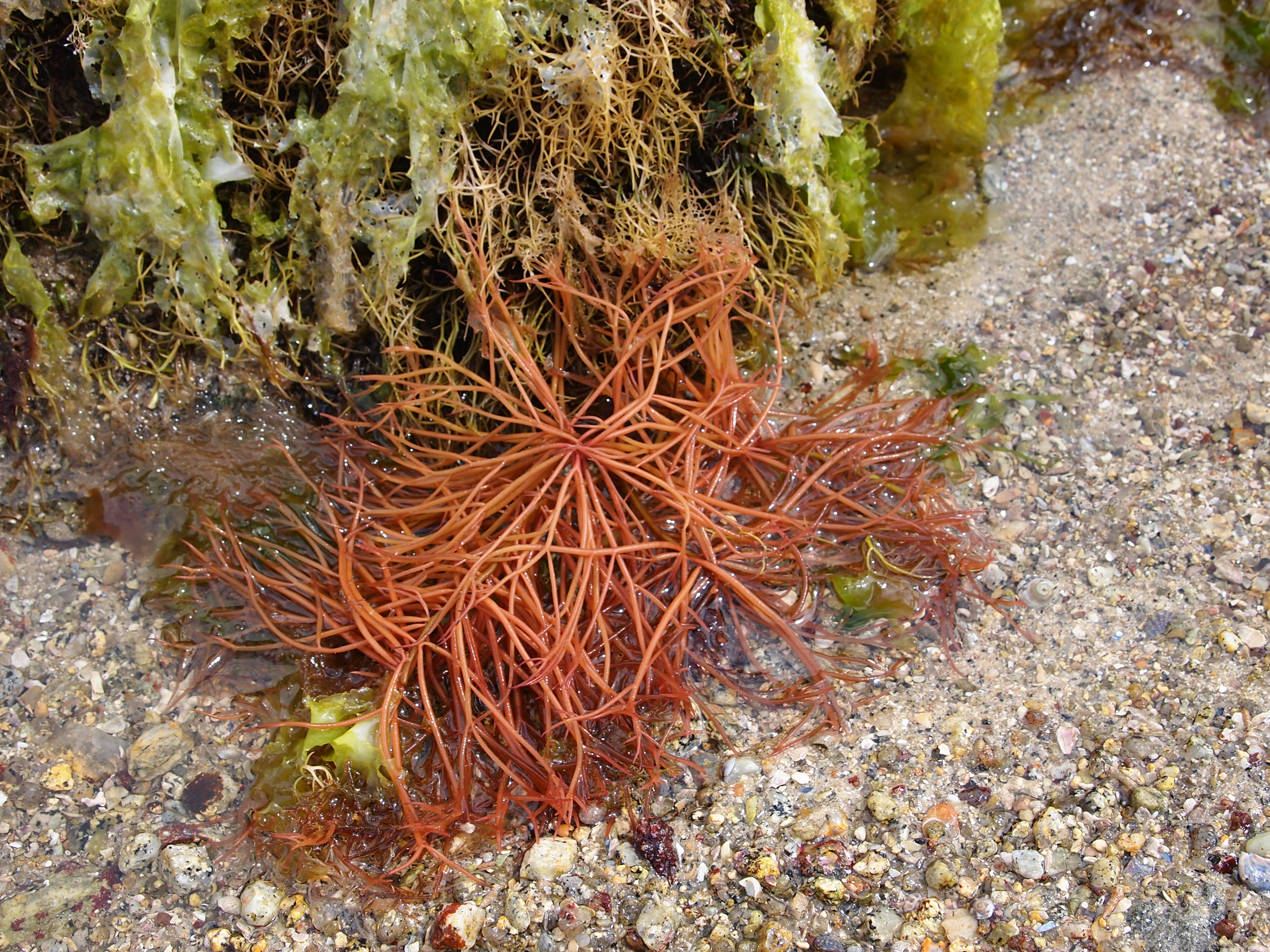
- Gracilaria at Concarneau, in Bretagne, France

Scientific classification
- Domain: Eukaryota
- Clade: Archaeplastida
- Division: Rhodophyta
- Class: Florideophyceae
- Order: Gracilariales
- Family: Gracilariaceae; Carl Nägeli, 1847

= Gracilariaceae =

Family of algae

The Gracilariaceae is a small family of red algae, containing several genera of agarophytes. It has a cosmopolitan distribution, in which 24 species are found in China, six in Great Britain and Ireland, and some in Australia and Chile.

They are normally found in intertidal bays, backwaters, and estuaries.

The family have been extensively investigated over the last 30 years, and various studies have yielded comprehensive information on their life history, cultivation, taxonomy, and utilization (Bellorin et al. 2002, Rueness 2005). Studies on the structure of their reproductive organs and the phylogenetic relationships among species inferred from rbcL sequence analyses have produced three clades at the genus level, namely Gracilaria, Gracilariopsis, and Hydropuntia (Gurgel and Fredericq 2004).

In 2012, the University of São Paulo, Brazil set up the Gracilariaceae Germplasm Bank, to use molecule markers for the identification of species.

== Genera ==
As accepted by GBIF;

- Crassiphycus Guiry, J.N.Norris, Fredericq & Gurgel, 2018 (7)
- Curdiea Harvey, 1855 (3)
- Graacilaria (1)
- Gracilaria Greville, 1830 (122)
- Gracilariophila Setchell & H.L.Wilson, 1910 (2)
- Gracilariopsis E.Y.Dawson, 1949 (17)
- Hydropuntia Montagne, 1842 (13)
- Melanthalia Montagne, 1843 (3)

Figures in brackets are approx. how many species per genus.

== Uses ==
They are economically important, as Agar can be derived from many types of red seaweeds, including those from families such as Gelidiaceae, Gracilariaceae, Gelidiellaceae and Pterocladiaceae. It is a polysaccharide located in the inner part of the red algal cell wall. It is used in food material, medicines, cosmetics, therapeutic and biotechnology industries.

== Other sources ==
- Bellorin AM, Buriyo A, Sohrabipour J, Oliveira MC, Oliveira EC (2008) Gracilariopsis mclachlanii sp. nov. and Gracilariopsis persica sp. nov. of the Gracilariaceae (Gracilariales, Rhodophyceae) from the Indian Ocean. J Phycol 44:1022–1032
- Conklin KY, O'Doberty DC, Sherwood AR (2014) Hydropuntia perplexa, n. comb. (Gracilariaceae, Rhodophyta), first record of the genus in Hawaii. Pac Sci 68:421–434
- Kamiya, M., Lindstrom, S.C., Nakayama, T., Yokoyama, A., Lin, S.-M., Guiry, M.D., Gurgel, F.D.G., Huisman, J.M., Kitayama, T., Suzuki, M., Cho, T.O. & Frey, W. 2017. Rhodophyta. In: Syllabus of Plant Families, 13th ed. Part 2/2: Photoautotrophic eukaryotic Algae. (Frey, W. Eds), pp. [i]–xii, [1]–171. Stuttgart: Borntraeger Science Publishers. ISBN 978-3-443-01094-2.
