= Agarophyte =

Type of seaweed that produces agar

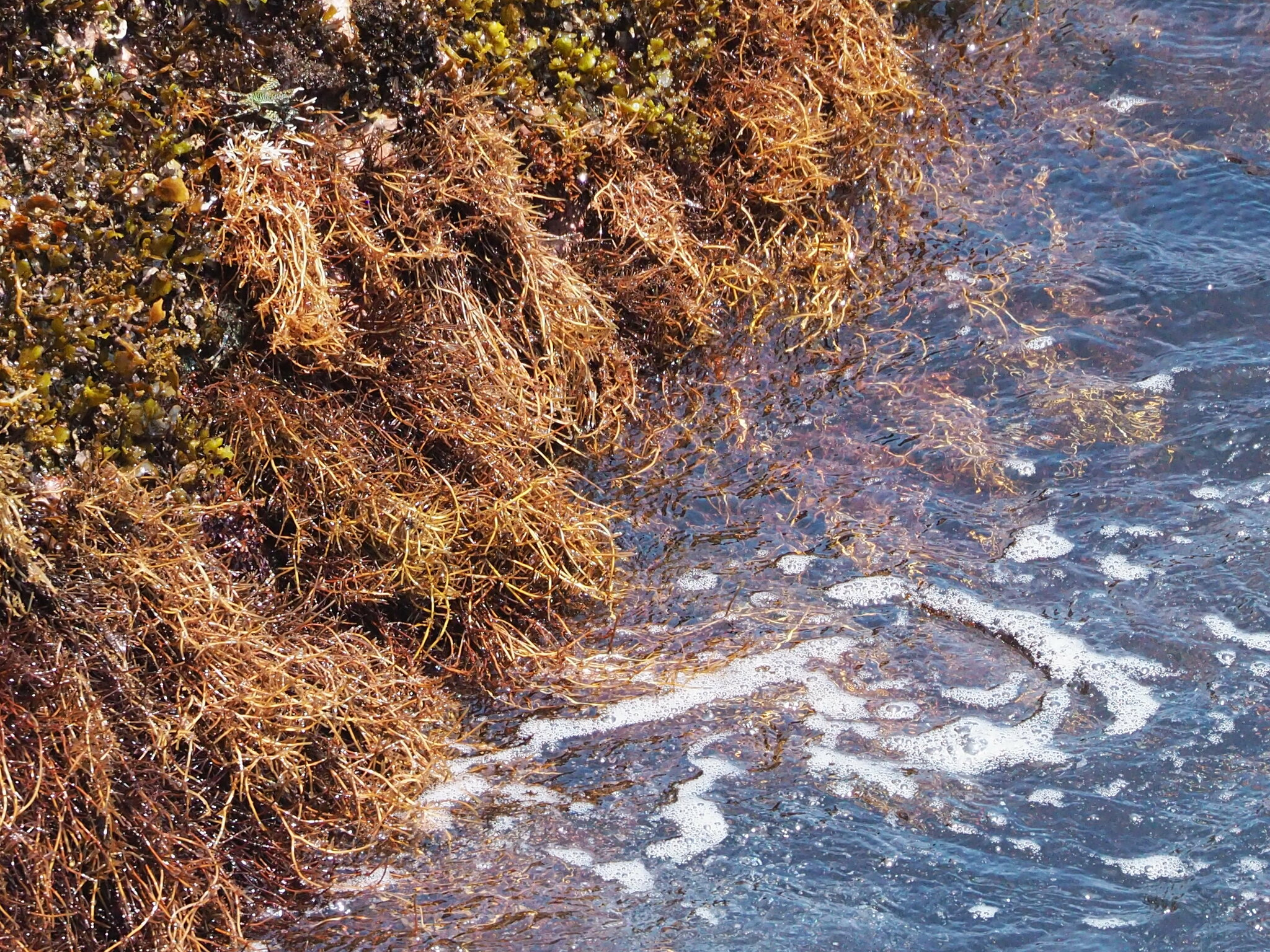
Gelidium amansii

An agarophyte is a seaweed, usually a red alga, that produces the hydrocolloid agar in its cell walls. This agar can be harvested commercially for use in biological experiments and culturing. In some countries (especially in the developing world), the harvesting of agarophytes, either as natural stocks or a cultivated crop, is of considerable economic importance. Notable genera of commercially exploited agarophytes include Gracilaria and Gelidium (such as Gelidium amansii and Gelidium corneum).
