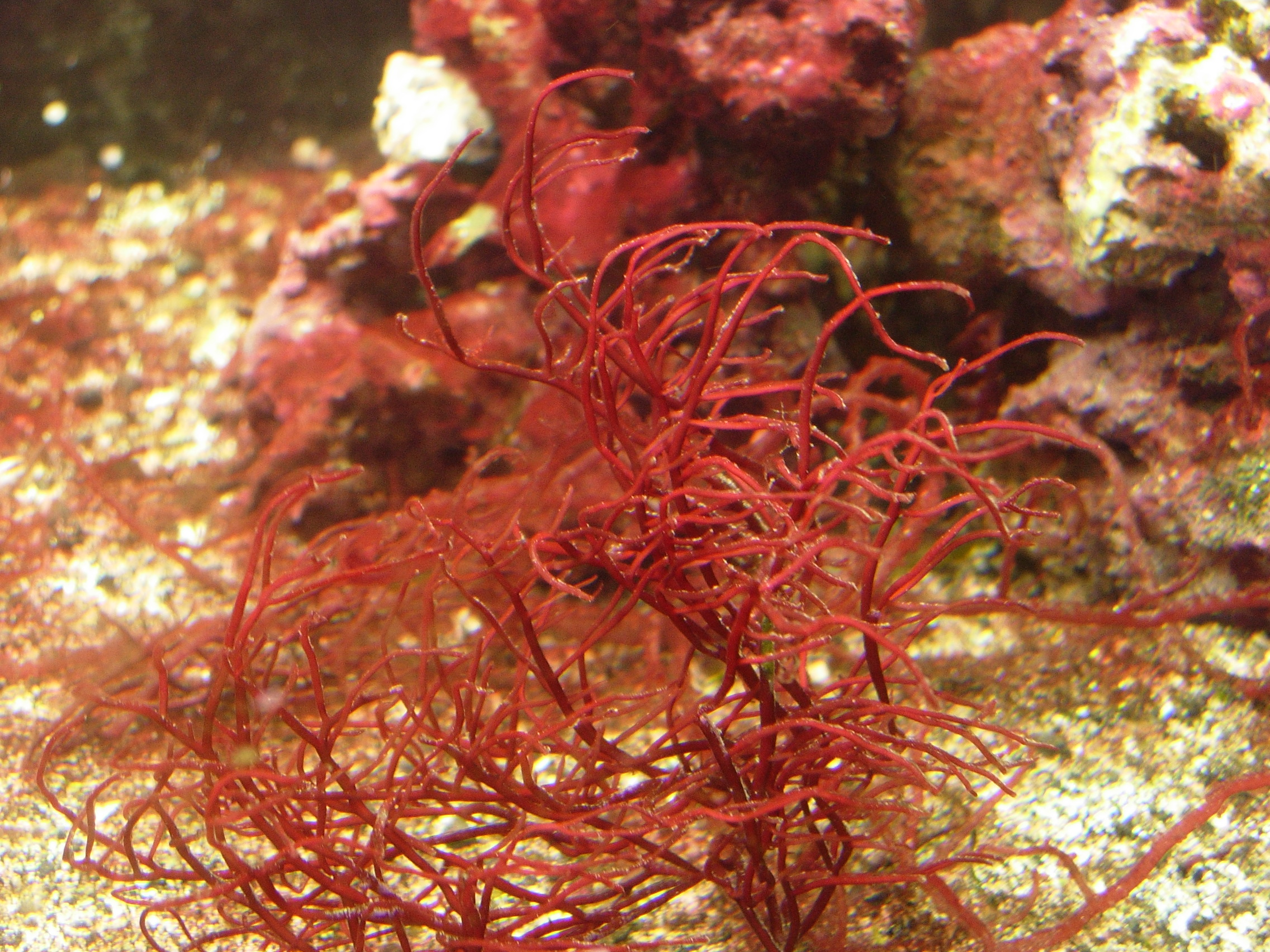
- Gracilaria sp.

Scientific classification
- Clade: Archaeplastida
- Division: Rhodophyta
- Class: Florideophyceae
- Subclass: Rhodymeniophycidae
- Order: Gracilariales; Fredericq & Hommersand

Families
- Gracilariaceae; Pterocladiophilaceae

= Gracilariales =

Order of algae

Gracilariales is an order of red algae.
