= Gelidiella calcicola =

Scientific classification
- Clade: Archaeplastida
- Division: Rhodophyta
- Class: Florideophyceae
- Order: Gelidiales
- Family: Gelidiellaceae
- Genus: Gelidiella
- Species: G. calcicola

Binomial name
- Gelidiella calcicola Maggs & Guiry 1988

Species of alga

Gelidiella calcicola is a rare seaweed species in the Rhodophyta, described for the first time in 1988.

== Botanical description ==
Gelidiella calcicola is a small creeping alga that forms prostrate low-growing tufts on the surface of calcareous substrata. The narrow compressed axes form peg-like rhizoidal attachment organs, and the axes branch laterally to form irregular pinnate branches. There are no true erect axes since all branches are in an horizontal plane. The axes which grow up at first always curve down and re-attach. They grow to at least 30 millimetres (1.2 in) long and are dark reddish brown. The species is very rare and may be under-recorded; it is sublittoral and not easily determined.

== Similar species ==
Gelidium pusillum is common in the British Isles and is similar in structure however it branches regularly and the production of tetraspores in stichnidia is different as is the internal structure when studied microscopically.
