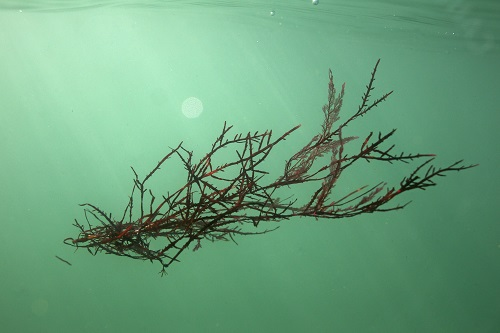
- Gelidium sesquipedale

Scientific classification
- Domain: Eukaryota
- Clade: Archaeplastida
- Division: Rhodophyta
- Class: Florideophyceae
- Order: Gelidiales
- Family: Gelidiaceae
- Genus: Gelidium
- Species: G. sesquipedale

Binomial name
- Gelidium sesquipedale (Clemente) Thuret 1876

Synonyms
- Fucus corneus var. sesquipedalis Clemente 1807

= Gelidium sesquipedale =

Species of alga

Gelidium sesquipedale is a commercially important species of red algae. It is a thalloid seaweed, branching on a single axis. A clonal species, it grows in stands on rocky bottoms in the subtidal zone in areas with high water movement and exposed to wave action.

== Distribution ==
It is found in the Atlantic Ocean between the coasts of the Great Britain and Mauritania. However, the most important concentrations of the species are found along the rocky coasts of France, Northern Spain, Portugal and Morocco.

== Commercial use ==
The species is an important commercial source of agar. The species are harvested either by commercial divers in Portugal and Morocco whereas in Spain and France floating detached thalli and beach coast are gathered. The former method may not be as sustainable however, yields and populations are in decline/have collapsed in Portugal as of the 2000s. Populations are also in decline in Morocco, the world's leading producer, leading to trade restrictions and to shortages of agar on the world market, notably for laboratory-grade product.

More recently, the species has started to be used in cosmetics, as a skin care and sunscreen ingredient. It contains metabolites such as carotenoids, peptides, and mycosporine-like amino acids, with antioxidant properties.
