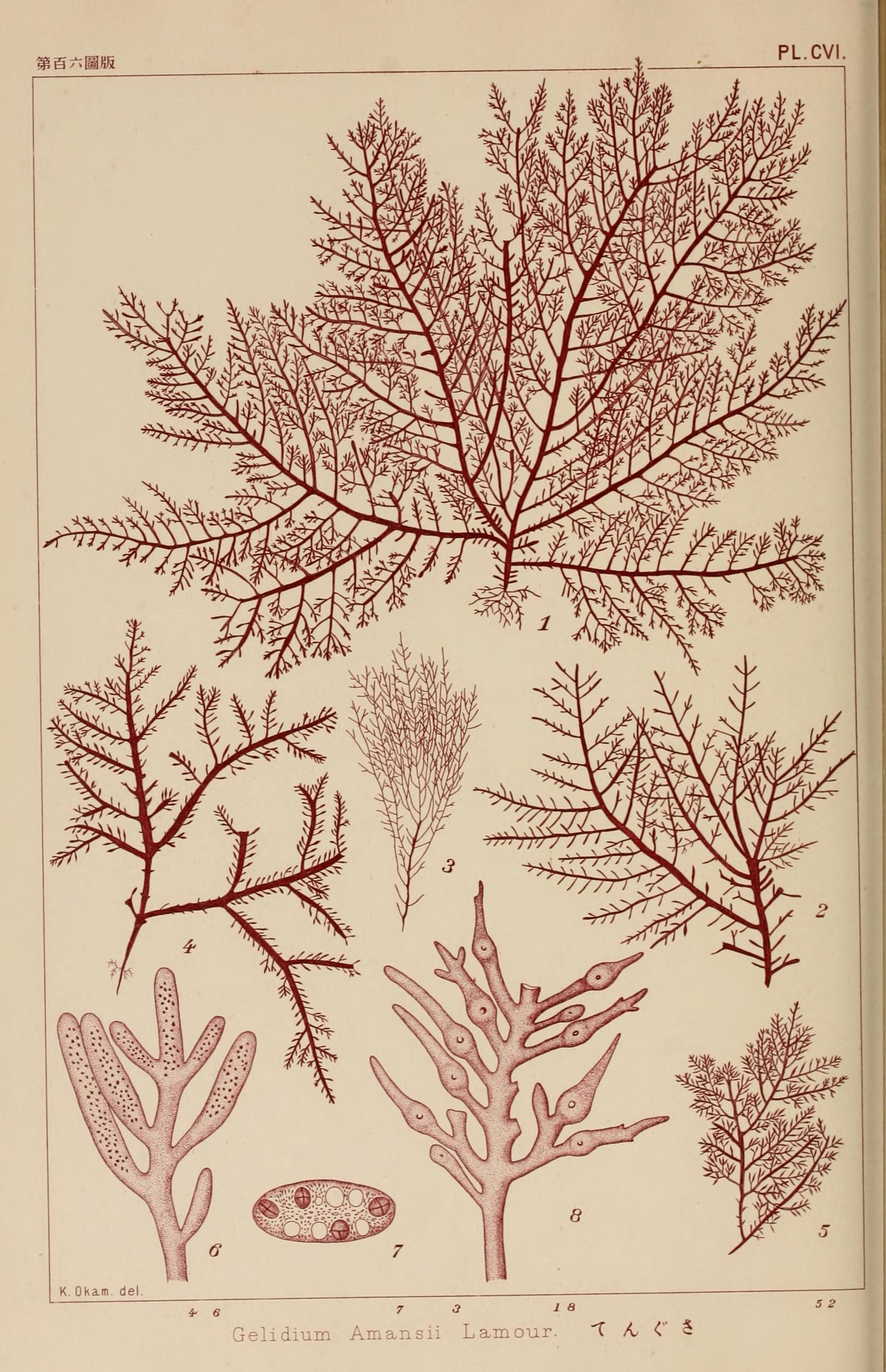
- Gelidium amansii

Scientific classification
- Domain: Eukaryota
- Clade: Archaeplastida
- Division: Rhodophyta
- Class: Florideophyceae
- Order: Gelidiales
- Family: Gelidiaceae
- Genus: Gelidium; J.V. Lamouroux, 1813

Synonyms
- Acanthopeltis Okamura, 1892

= Gelidium =

Genus of algae

Gelidium is a genus of thalloid red algae comprising 134 species. Its members are known by a number of common names. (Note: Recorded common names are tengusa, makusa, genso, niu mau tsai, japansche scheleiachtige mos, steen-or klipbloem, hay tsay, olus marinus, sajur laut, tschintschau, tschoo-hoae, onikusa, hirakusa, obusa, rødalge-slaegt, gelídeos, punalevä-suku, tokoroten, kanten, tokoro-tengusa, kinukusa, isingglass, hai-ten-gusa, tocoroten, tengusa-agar, limu lo-loa, hai-tengusa, onigusa, oyakusa, kanten weed, goumaocai, hime tengusa, shihua and tanmae.)

== Description and life cycle ==
Specimens can reach around 2–40 cm (0.79–16 in) in size. Branching is irregular, or occurs in rows on either side of the main stem. Gelidium produces tetraspores. Many of the algae in this genus are used to make agar. Agarocolloids are known to be extracted in algae belonging to the orders Gracilariales and Gelidiales with certain applications in the food and cosmetics. Gelling properties often differ among species, seasons, seaweed age, and substitutions between sulphate esters, among other compounds. Sulphate composition often dictates gel strength, while methyl esters determine gelling and elasticity.

Gelidium is assumed to follow the Polysiphonia life cycle, with sexual and tetrasporangial generations. Tetrasporangia formation is also known to be affected by temperature and other environmental factors including light, salinity and moisture, although germination rates remain unaffected based on an earlier study.

In 1993, Gelidium robustum in Santa Barbara, California was investigated for 16-months showing tetrasporangial abundance throughout the year, but may not have the ability to germinate despite maximum spore output.

== Distribution ==
Gelidium are widely distributed globally, specifically in tropical to temperate regions, but lacking in polar regions. In the ocean, Gelidium can be found inhabiting the intertidal to subtidal zone. Species from the genus require further studies to distinguish boundaries among members, as recent molecular research have shown that there are cryptic, unidentified species assumed to be regionally endemic and isolated but may also be ubiquitous in nature. Some species are common in the Atlantic and Pacific Ocean (G. crinale) while some are confined in North Atlantic waters (G. pussillum). Reports of G. pussillum occurrence outside of its specified range may be questionable and requires further verification.

== Ecology ==
Gelidiales consists of many species that are economically important as they produce agar while some serve ecologically significant functions such as substrate cover. The growth of Gelidium can primarily be affected by nutrient availability and light. In turn, these factors are also regulated by temperature and water movement, respectively. Santelices (1991) evaluated how eight factors may affect Gelidium productivity, all of which are important in understanding how different interactions correlate to production yield. Some of these factors include seasonality, phenotypic characters, age, reproductive state, and even the source of the algae.

== Cultivation and exploitation ==
An important agarophyte, Gelidium has been cultured in Korea and China since the early 1990s, with some cultivation efforts noted in Europe, specifically in Spain and Portugal. In South Africa, G. pristoides has been cultivated in the field while laboratory trials on G. crinale and Pterocladiella capillacea were tested in Israel. In Portugal, G. sesquipedale has commonly been harvested for agar since the 1960s. Management strategies are yet to be implemented especially among big commercial companies that should be responsible in harvesting the resource, similar to South Africa where the decrease in annual Gelidium landings show how fisher folk shifted to collecting kelp for abalone feeds instead of Gelidium harvesting.

Gelidium has been found to be over-exploited in Japan, depleting algal beds which in part, affects agar production, pushing the need for even more efforts in cultivation, replacing the practice of harvesting wild Gelidium. In 2017, global data have shown that Norway, China, and Chile are among the countries that lead the overharvesting of seaweeds, mostly kelp. Advances in Gelidium cultivation have been put forth including the use of floaters at sea and marine ponds for free-float technology in cultivation. At its core, environmental factors are needed to be controlled for favorable growth of Gelidium revealing how ponds may be the better option among the set-ups.

Agar is primarily extracted from Gelidium especially among North African Atlantic and South European species based on specific gel properties with water. In Morocco, Gelidium sesquipidale is known to be harvested during summer time to extract agar used commercially, making the country among the top producers in the world.

== Historical environmental analysis ==
Gelidium species have been collected, pressed and maintained in herbaria and personal collections from the 1850s onwards since seaweed collecting became a popular pastime for the middle classes as well as scientists in Europe and North America. These numerous well-documented specimens can provide information beyond taxonomy.

Sensitive measurement of stable nitrogen isotope ratios in Gelidium species collected in southern Monterey Bay between 1878 and 2018 showed a pattern of changes that matched with changes in the California current and provided support for a theory about the end of the local fishing industry. Nitrogen isotope ratios are well established as a measure of nutrient productivity in aquatic ecosystems. The California current runs along coastal California and correlation with information on fish catches indicates that an increase in nutrient-rich cold water is important for fish productivity, notably sardines. The California current has only been measured since 1946. The correlations with the Gelidium nitrogen ratios allowed the California current to be projected back into the nineteenth century and compared with historical records of fish catches. The data matched, notably for the highest sardine catches through the 1930s and then the sudden decrease from 1945 to 1950 that ended the Monterey cannery industry. This information supports the theory that environmental changes as well as overfishing caused the collapse of the local fishery business. More broadly, this suggests that elemental analysis of historical samples of macroalgae can provide evidence of primary productivity processes. The species used included specimens of G. coulteri, G. robustum, G. purpurascens, G. pusillum and G. arborescens collected over a 140-year timespan from the 6 km coastline between Point Pinos, Pacific Grove and Cannery Row, Monterey in California, US.

== Taxonomy and nomenclature ==
Gelidiaceae has 159 species, considered to be the largest family in Gelidiales with four major genera: Capreolia, Gelidium, Gelidiophycus, and Ptilophora.

Gelidium was first described by Lamouroux in 1813 and is regarded to be one the genera with the most species. Species diversity has been established by previous studies, whereas, molecular analysis reveals biogeographic relations that concerns its current distribution pattern in oceans.

Identification of species has been a challenge as sexual plants are somewhat difficult to find in nature, therefore, other physiological features are examined instead, such as branching patterns and vegetative traits, but subsequent studies revealed that these are also affected by its development and environmental factors highlighting the need for genetic studies utilizing genetic markers.

=== Species ===
- Gelidium affine
- Gelidium allanii
- Gelidium amamiense
- Gelidium amansii
- Gelidium ambiguum
- Gelidium americanum
- Gelidium anthonini
- Gelidium applanatum
- Gelidium arborescens
- Gelidium arenarium
- Gelidium asperum
- Gelidium australe
- Gelidium bernabei
- Gelidium bipectinatum
- Gelidium canariense
- Gelidium cantabricum
- Gelidium capense
- Gelidium caulacantheum
- Gelidium ceramoides
- Gelidium chilense
- Gelidium coarctatum
- Gelidium concinnum
- Gelidium congestum
- Gelidium coronadense
- Gelidium coulteri
- Gelidium crinale
- Gelidium crispum
- Gelidium deciduum
- Gelidium decompositum
- Gelidium delicatulum
- Gelidium divaricatum
- Gelidium elegans
- Gelidium elminense
- Gelidium fasciculatum
- Gelidium filicinum
- Gelidium flaccidum
- Gelidium floridanum
- Gelidium foliaceum
- Gelidium foliosum
- Gelidium galapagense
- Gelidium hancockii
- Gelidium heterocladum
- Gelidium hommersandii
- Gelidium howei
- Gelidium hypnosum
- Gelidium inagakii
- Gelidium inflexum
- Gelidium intertextum
- Gelidium isabelae
- Gelidium japonicum
- Gelidium johnstonii
- Gelidium kintaroi
- Gelidium latiusculum
- Gelidium lingulatum
- Gelidium linoides
- Gelidium longipes
- Gelidium macnabbianum
- Gelidium madagascariense
- Gelidium maggsiae
- Gelidium masudae
- Gelidium microdentatum
- Gelidium microdon
- Gelidium microdonticum
- Gelidium microphyllum
- Gelidium microphysa
- Gelidium micropterum
- Gelidium minusculum
- Gelidium multifidum
- Gelidium musciforme
- Gelidium nova-granatense
- Gelidium nudifrons
- Gelidium omanense
- Gelidium pacificum
- Gelidium planiusculum
- Gelidium pluma
- Gelidium pristoides
- Gelidium profundum
- Gelidium pseudointricatum
- Gelidium pteridifolium
- Gelidium pulchellum
- Gelidium pulchrum
- Gelidium pulvinatum
- Gelidium purpurascens
- Gelidium pusillum
- Gelidium reediae
- Gelidium refugiensis
- Gelidium regulare
- Gelidium reptans
- Gelidium rex
- Gelidium rigens
- Gelidium robustum
- Gelidium samoense
- Gelidium sclerophyllum
- Gelidium secundatum
- Gelidium semipinnatum
- Gelidium serrulatum
- Gelidium sesquipedale
- Gelidium sinicola
- Gelidium spathulatum
- Gelidium spinosum
- Gelidium subfastigiatum
- Gelidium tenue
- Gelidium tsengii
- Gelidium umbricola
- Gelidium usmanghanii
- Gelidium vagum
- Gelidium venetum
- Gelidium venturianum
- Gelidium versicolor
- Gelidium vietnamense
- Gelidium vittatum
- Gelidium yamadae
- Gelidium zollingeri
