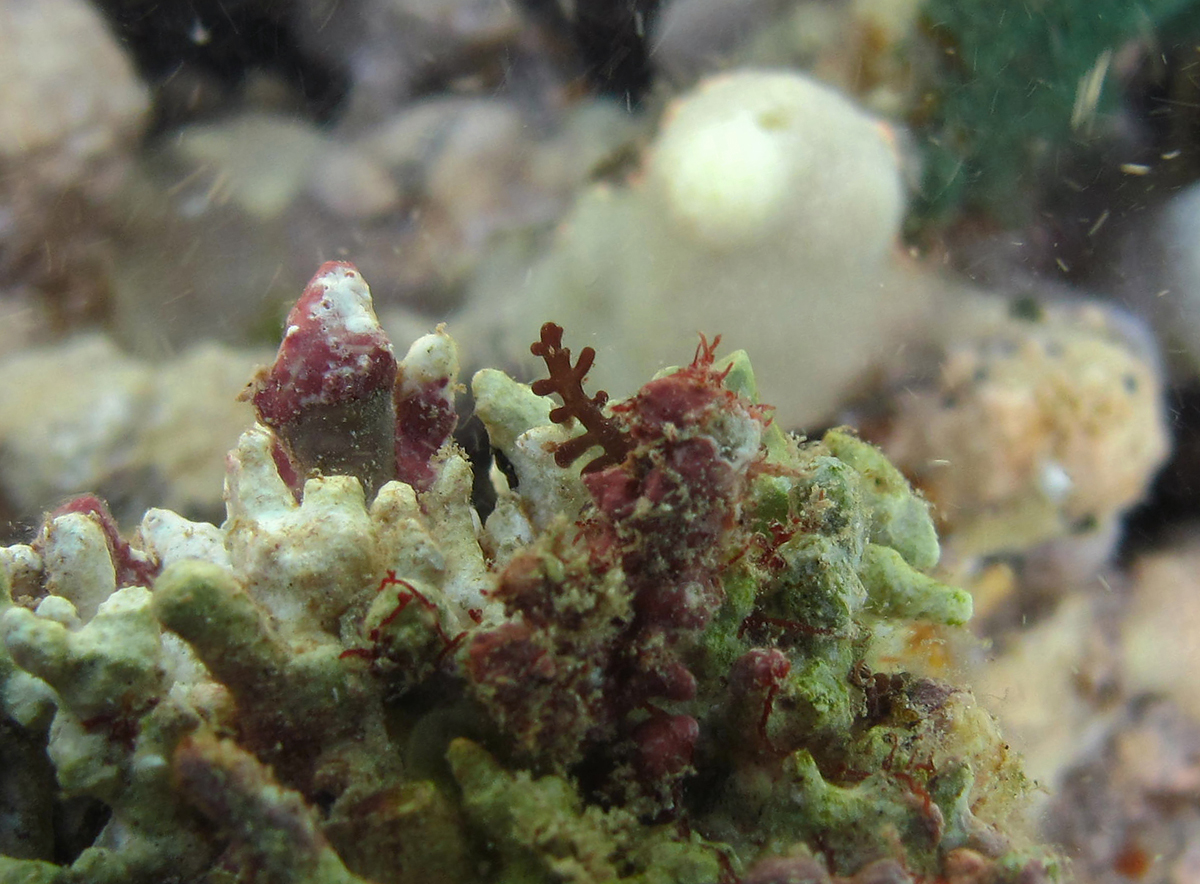
- Gelidiella acerosa from the island of Réunion.

Scientific classification
- Clade: Archaeplastida
- Division: Rhodophyta
- Class: Florideophyceae
- Order: Gelidiales
- Family: Gelidiellaceae
- Genus: Gelidiella; Feldmann & G.Hamel

Species
- Gelidiella acerosa Gelidiella calcicola Gelidiella pannosa Gelidiella ramellosa …

= Gelidiella =

Genus of algae

Gelidiella is a genus of red algae (phylum Rhodophyta). Worldwide there are 22 species of Gelidiella, mostly tropical and subtropical. Gelidiella and Gelidium are now both united into one order Gelidiales.

Gelidiella acerosa has been used in the treatment of Alzheimer's disease.
