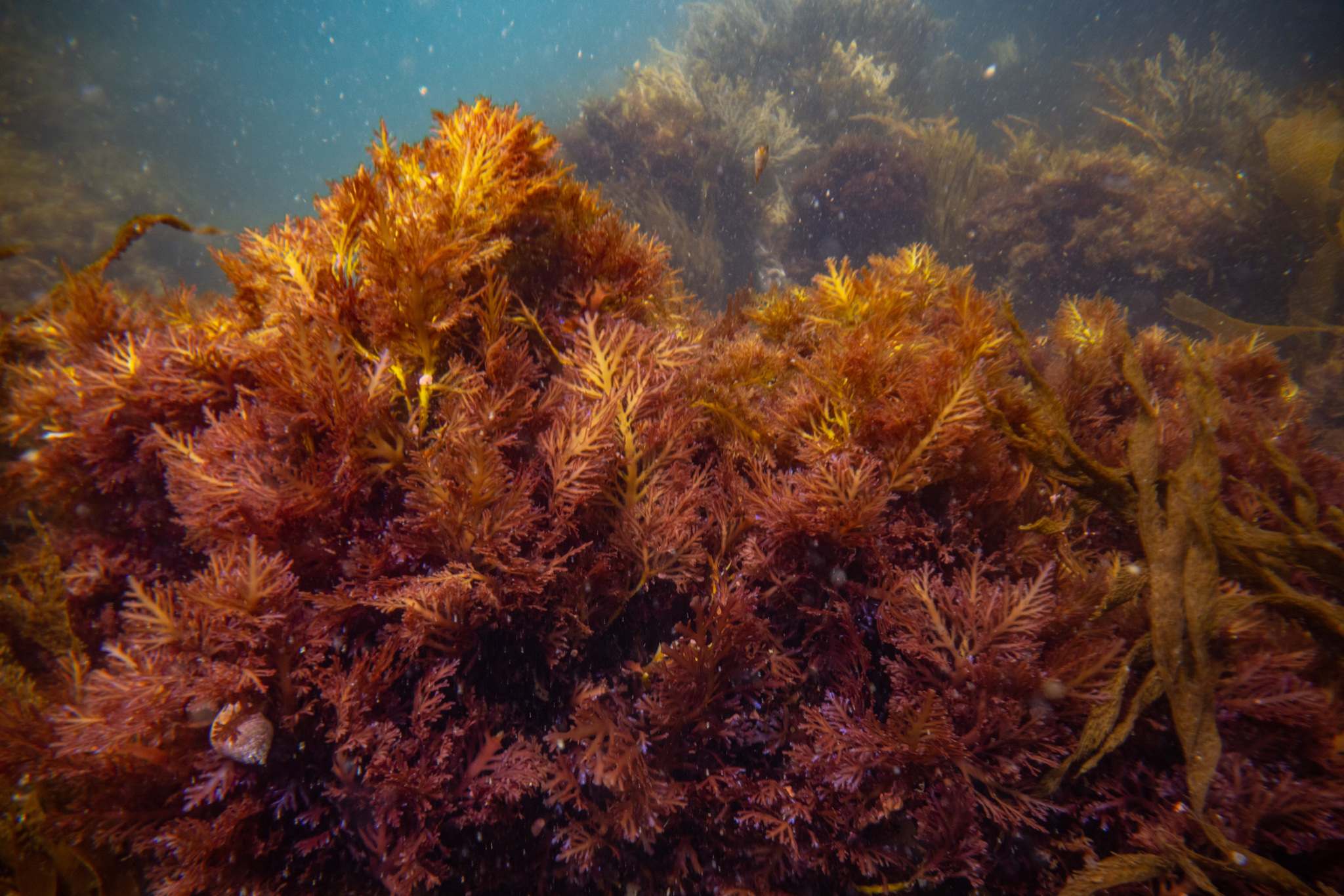
- Pterocladia lucida in its habitat

Scientific classification
- Domain: Eukaryota
- Clade: Archaeplastida
- Division: Rhodophyta
- Class: Florideophyceae
- Order: Gelidiales
- Family: Pterocladiaceae
- Genus: Pterocladia
- Species: P. lucida

Binomial name
- Pterocladia lucida (R.Br. ex Turner) J.Agardh, 1851

= Pterocladia lucida =

Species of red algae

Pterocladia lucida is a native red algae found in New Zealand and Australia. Since the 1940s it has been the basis of New Zealand's agar industry.

It is also known as rimurimu, the general te reo Māori term for seaweed.

== Description ==
Pterocladia lucida is flat along the main axis, and its branch tips are often pale.

The thallus is red-brown to dark red in colour and grows up to 40 cm long. The branching and width vary significantly between individuals but this is likely environmental rather than indicative of speciation.

When dried it becomes crisp, while similar species often become soft or disintegerate.

== Distribution and habitat ==
In New Zealand P. lucida is found from Northland to Kaikōura as well as around Manawatāwhi / Three Kings Islands and Rēkohu / Chatham Islands, and in Australia from Perth to New South Wales and Tasmania.

It is commonly found on exposed rough-water coasts on low-tide rocks and to a depth of about 7m (23 ft). It will firmly attach to hard rocks, and often host large quantities of other red algae epiphytes including Aristoptilon mooreanum.

== Taxonomy ==
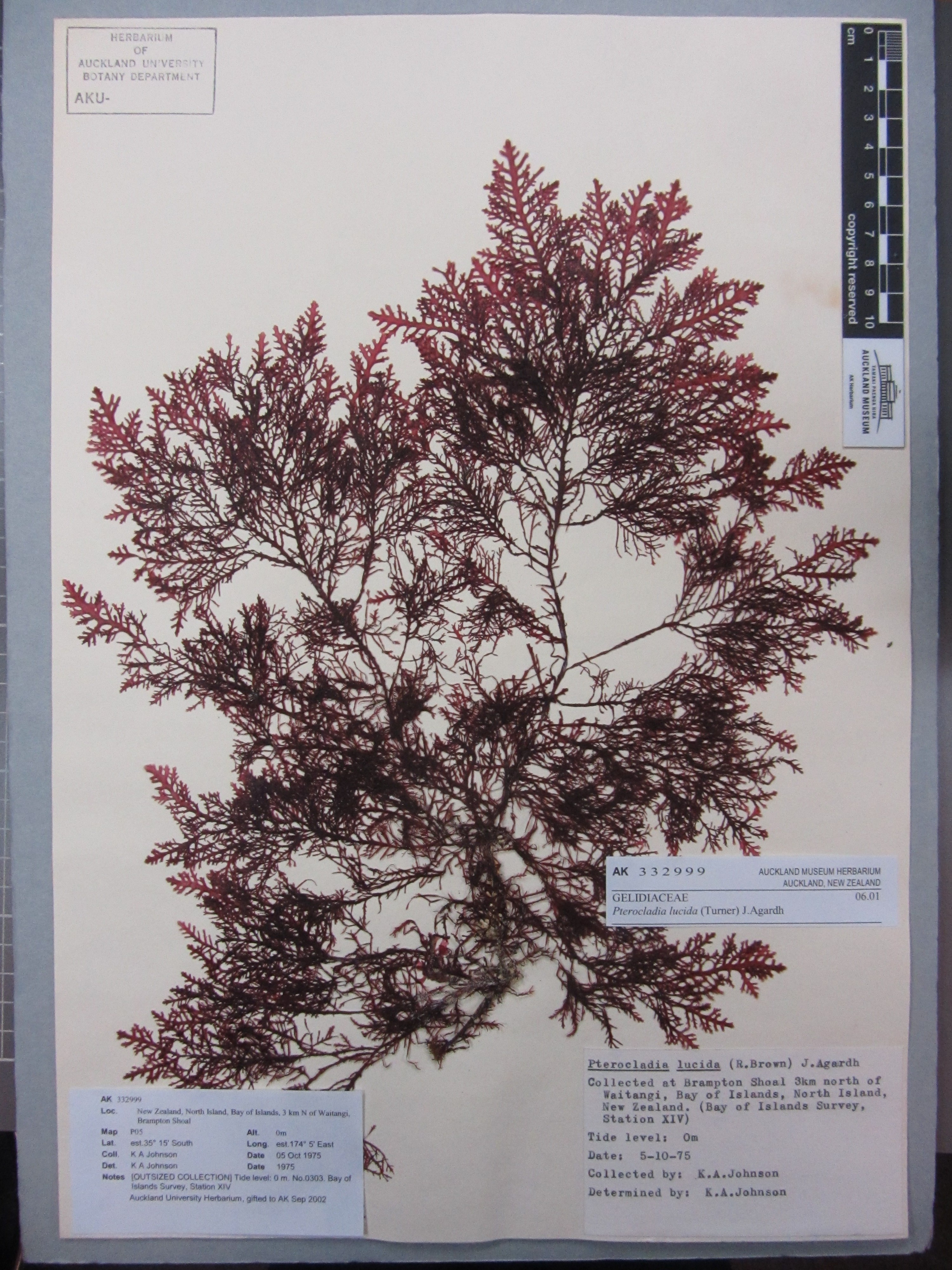
Pterocladia lucida specimen, Auckland Museum

The species was originally described in 1819 by Scottish botanist Robert Brown as Fucus lucidus. The type specimen was collected by Brown on the southern coast of Australia and is held at the Natural History Museum herbarium (BM001067881). The specific epithet lucidus (Latin: 'shining') is in reference to the glossy surface, "as if varnished", and was compared to the similar quality of Boletus lucidus (Ganoderma lucidum).

In 1851 J.G. Agardh transferred the species to the new genus Pterocladia, making P. lucida the type species for the genus.

In 2016 genetic analysis found that the P. lucida found in New Zealand is significantly different from that in Australia, where the holotype was collected. Three New Zealand species have been provisionally distinguished, but not yet described:

- Pterocladia sp. A (ASN672; Manawatāwhi)
- Pterocladia sp. B (ASP033; lineage 1 sensu Boo et al. 2016)
- Pterocladia sp. C (ASN327; lineage 2 sensu Boo et al. 2016)

== Agar industry ==
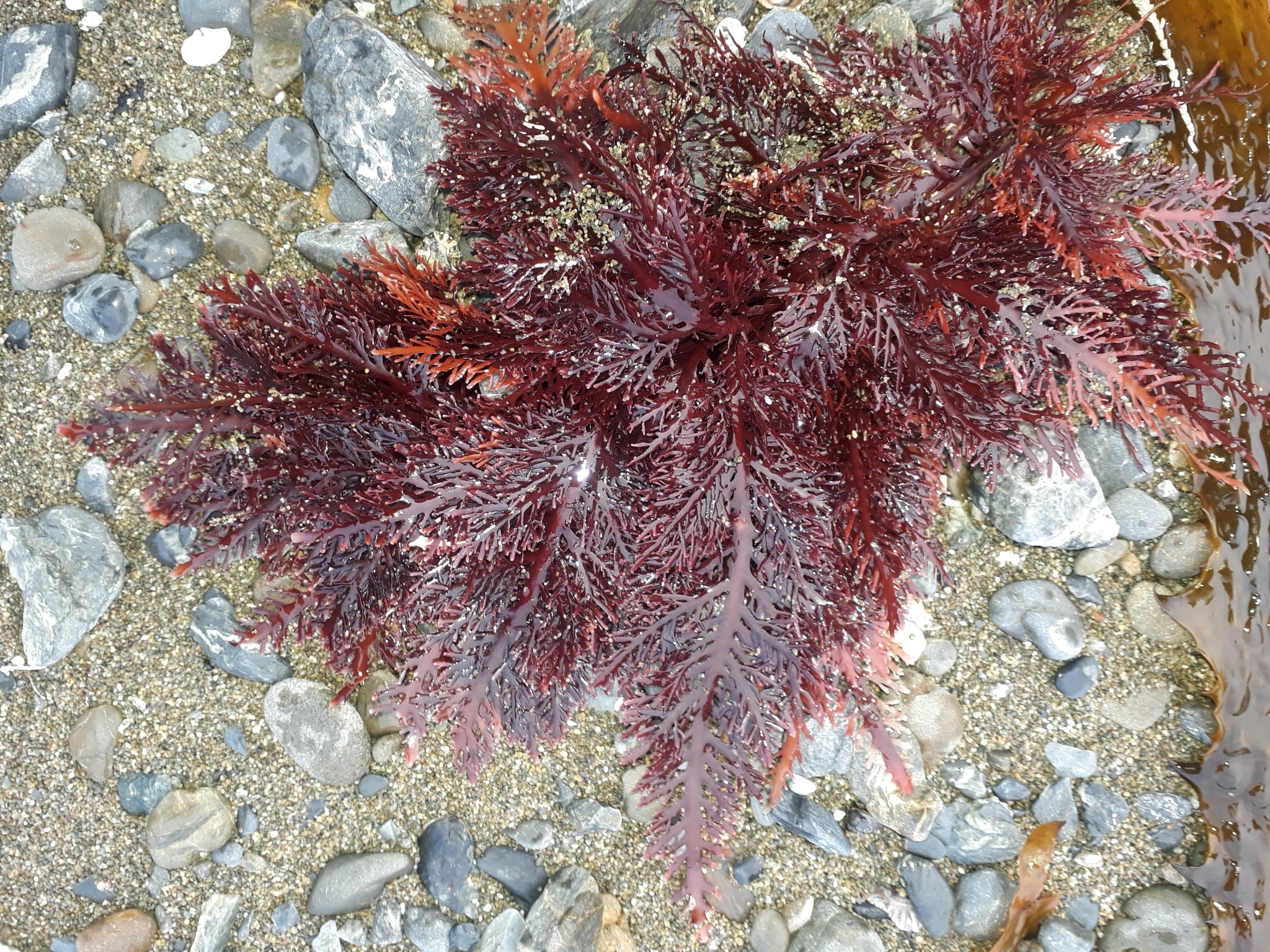
Pterocladia lucida out of the water

Pterocladia lucida can be processed into high-quality agar, used in food production and microbiological sectors. Unlike Gracilaria-like species it is low in sulphate, resulting in greater gel strength without extra alkali treatment.

Processing yields 10-30% of dry weight as usable agarophyte.

Until the Second World War New Zealand's industrial supply of agar came from Japan. When Japan entered the war Allied nations looked for alternative sources and in 1941 Lucy Moore of DSIR identified P. lucida as a viable commercial-scale species. In 2019 this effort was fictionalised in Julie McKee's play The Secret Life of Seaweed.

By 1942 New Zealand's government had gathered and analysed 100 lb of the species from the Bay of Plenty, finding the resulting product was excellent, "bacteriologically, physically, and chemically". Ongoing surveys found usable amounts of P. lucida at Cape Turnagain, Castlepoint, Kaikōura and Taranaki, and over 70 tons was collected in 1943.

Members of the public could gather, dry and send the seaweed in for processing, paid by New Zealand's government, starting at 9d per pound in 1942. Most of these small-scale suppliers were East Coast Māori. By 1979 collectors had to be licensed by the Ministry of Agriculture and Fisheries so harvesting could be monitored to avoid damage to plant beds. In 1994, around 800 people were employed full- or part-time in collecting for a single company, many around the Wairarapa town of Ngawi.

Contemporary commercial and industrial use of P. lucida and other seaweeds is influenced by Treaty of Waitangi settlements, as well as the recommendations of the Waitangi Tribunal's Wai 262 report.

Pterocladia lucida is not common enough in South Australia to use industrially.
