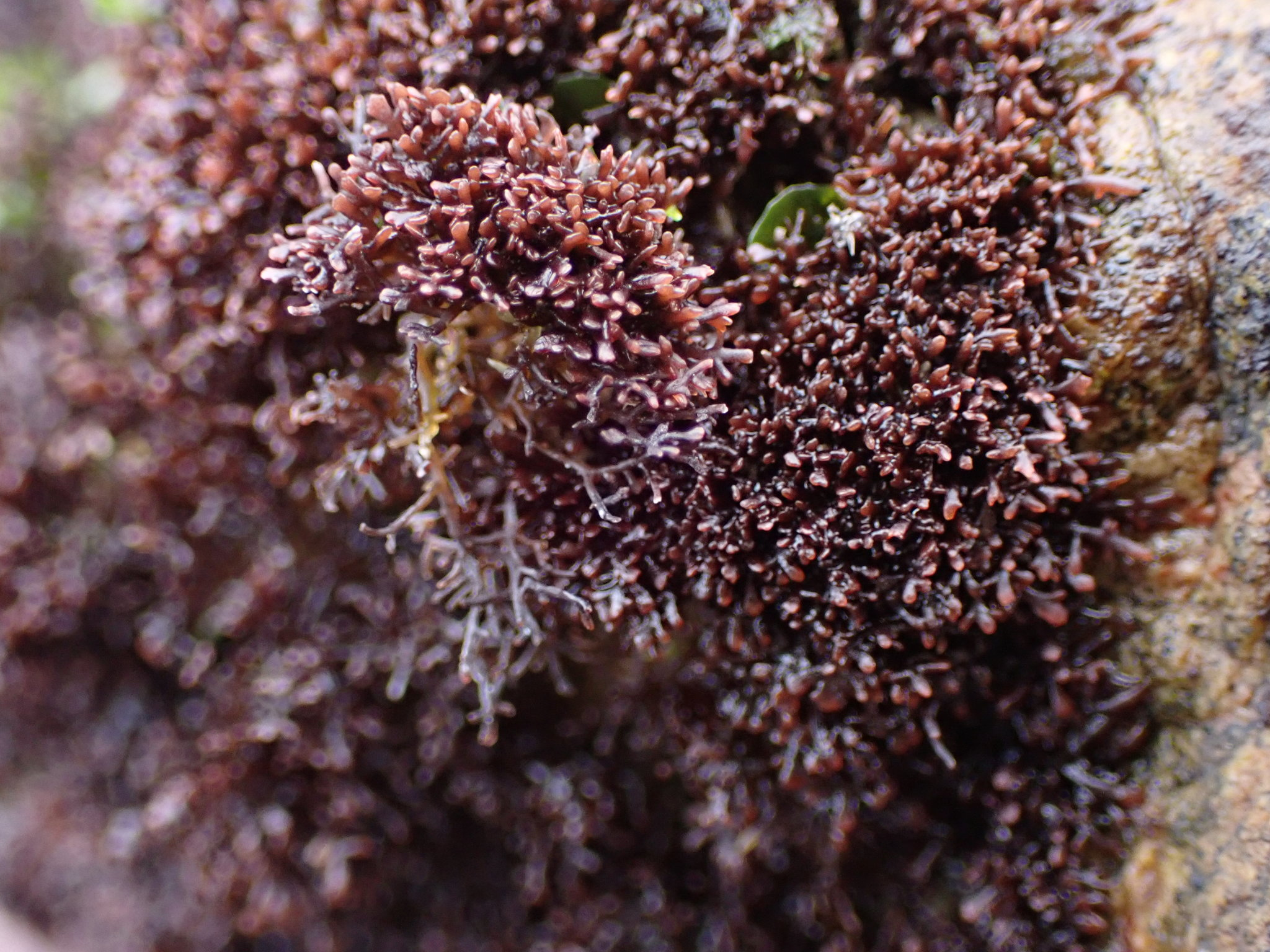

Scientific classification
- Clade: Archaeplastida
- Division: Rhodophyta
- Class: Florideophyceae
- Order: Gelidiales
- Family: Gelidiaceae
- Genus: Capreolia; Guiry & Womersley, 1993

= Capreolia =

Genus of algae

Capreolia is a genus of red algae belonging to the family Gelidiaceae.

The species of this genus are found in Australia and New Zealand.

Species: Capreolia implexa Guiry & Womersley
