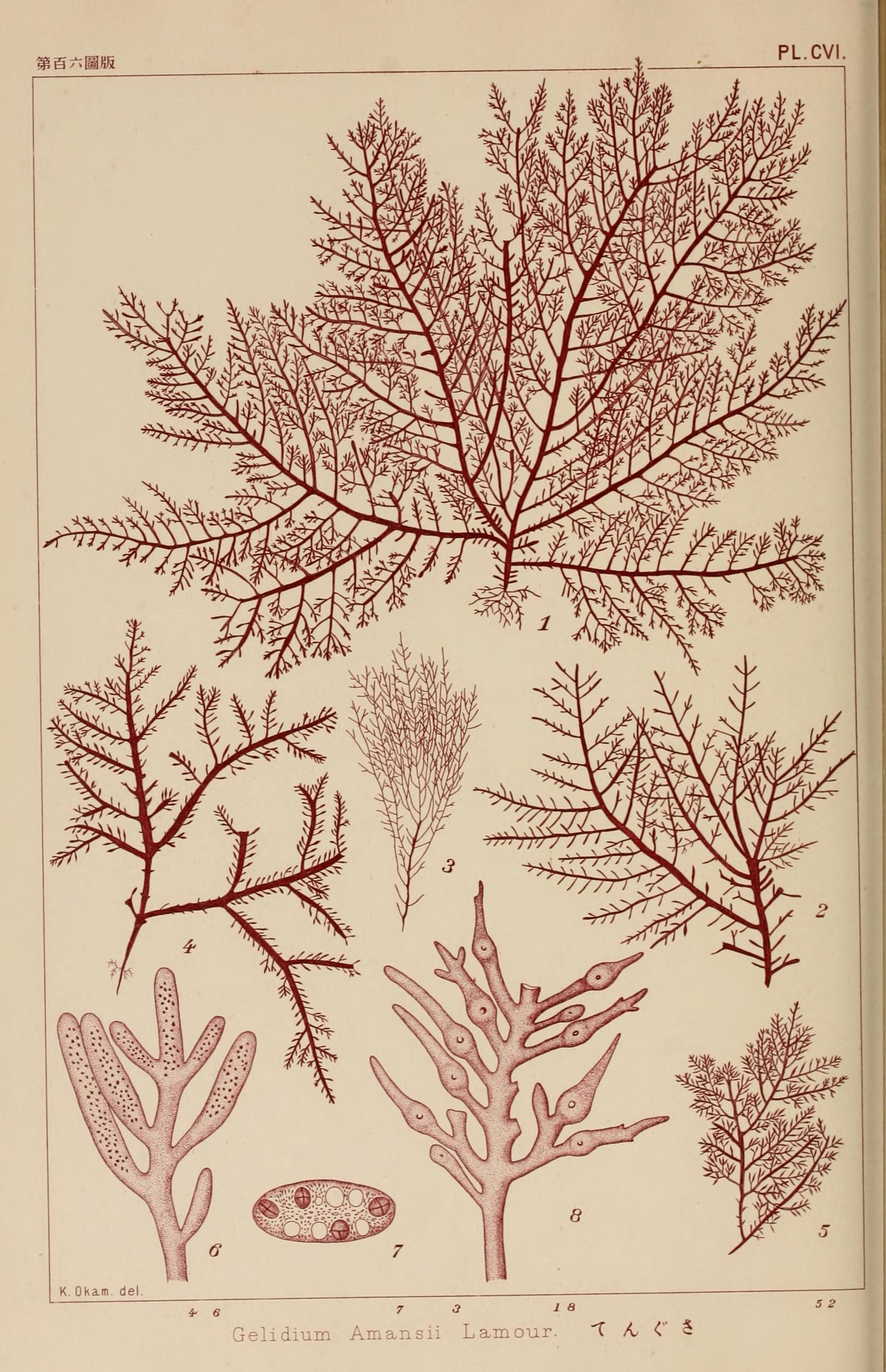
- Illustration of Gelidium amansii
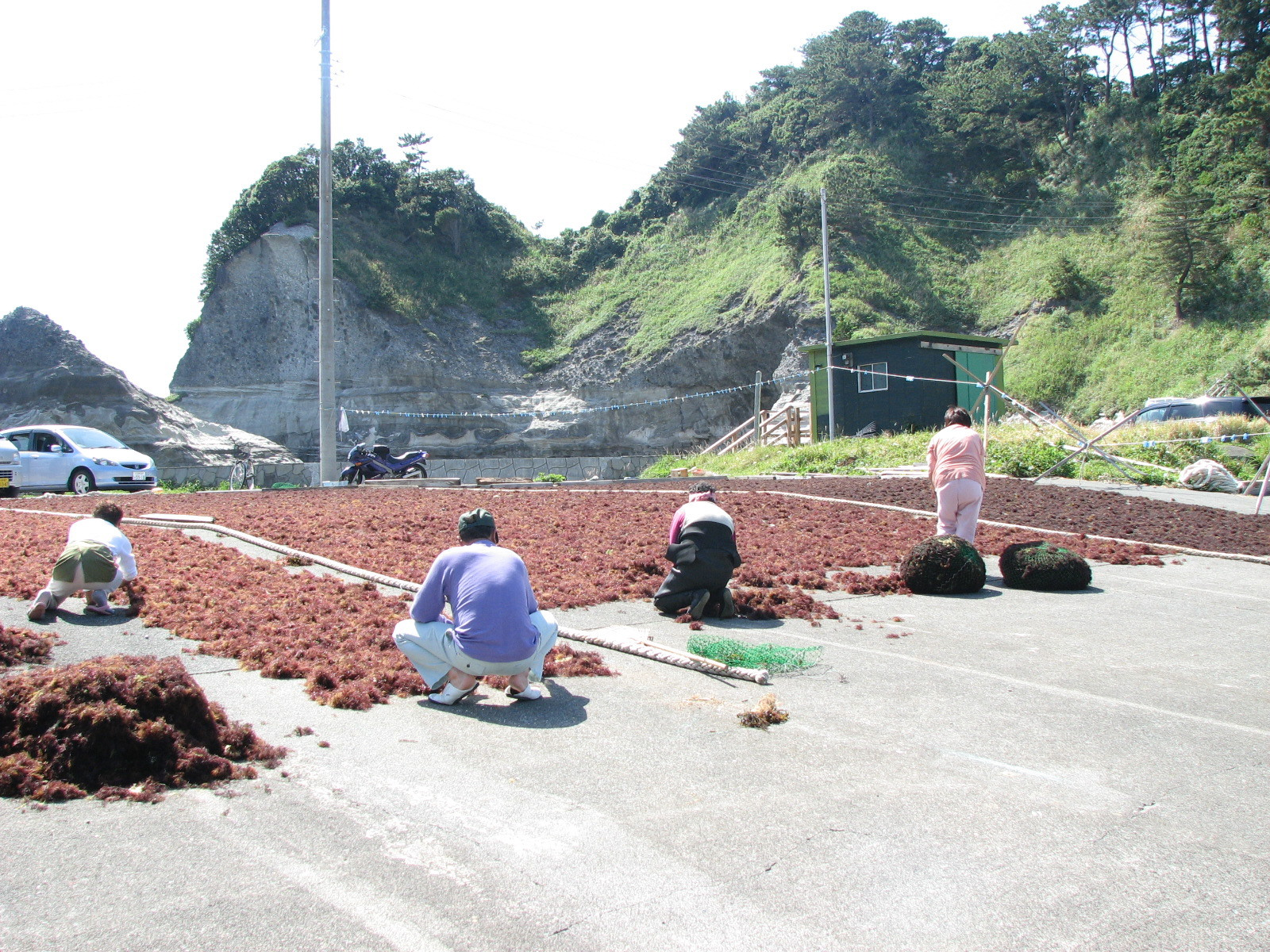
- Drying Gelidium amansii to make agar in Japan

Scientific classification
- Domain: Eukaryota
- Clade: Archaeplastida
- Division: Rhodophyta
- Class: Florideophyceae
- Order: Gelidiales
- Family: Gelidiaceae
- Genus: Gelidium
- Species: G. amansii

Binomial name
- Gelidium amansii (J.V.Lamour.)

= Gelidium amansii =

Species of alga

Gelidium amansii, known in Japan as tengusa (テングサ), in Korea as umutgasari (우뭇가사리), and in China as shí huā cài (石花菜), is an economically important species of red algae commonly found and harvested in the shallow coastal waters (3 to 10 m depth) of many East Asian countries, including China, Japan, North and South Korea, Singapore, and northeast Taiwan.

== Description ==
G. amansii can be purple, red, to yellowish-red because it contains the class of pigments known as phycobiliprotein. Its branching body is cartilaginous and can grow up to a height of 8 to 30 cm or 3 to 12 in. G. amansii may have four or five opposite, compound-lobed, pinnate leaves on each branch. It is uniaxial with an apical cell and whorled cells coming from the axial towards the exterior of the algae. The pith is compacted with apical cells and the epidermis is formed by rounded whorled cells.

== Uses ==
G. amansii is an important food source in East Asian countries and has been shown to have medicinal effects on dieting. Hence, in folklore medicine G. amansii is used to treat constipation. In Japan, it was historically used to make tokoroten.

This algae is used to make agar, whose components are the polysaccharide agarose and agaropectin, from the large amount of algin which is located in the algae's cell wall, as well it is sometimes served as part of a salad, puddings, jams, and other culinary dishes in producing regions. Agar is a gelatinous substance that is commercially used both as an ingredient in gelatinous desserts and as an incubation matrix for microbes and other products that require an ecologically friendly gelatinous matrix. G. amansii is being studied as a cheap biofuel.

== See also ==
- Alginic acid
- Chondrus crispus
- List of kampo herbs
