= Tokoroten =

Seaweed-based Japanese dish

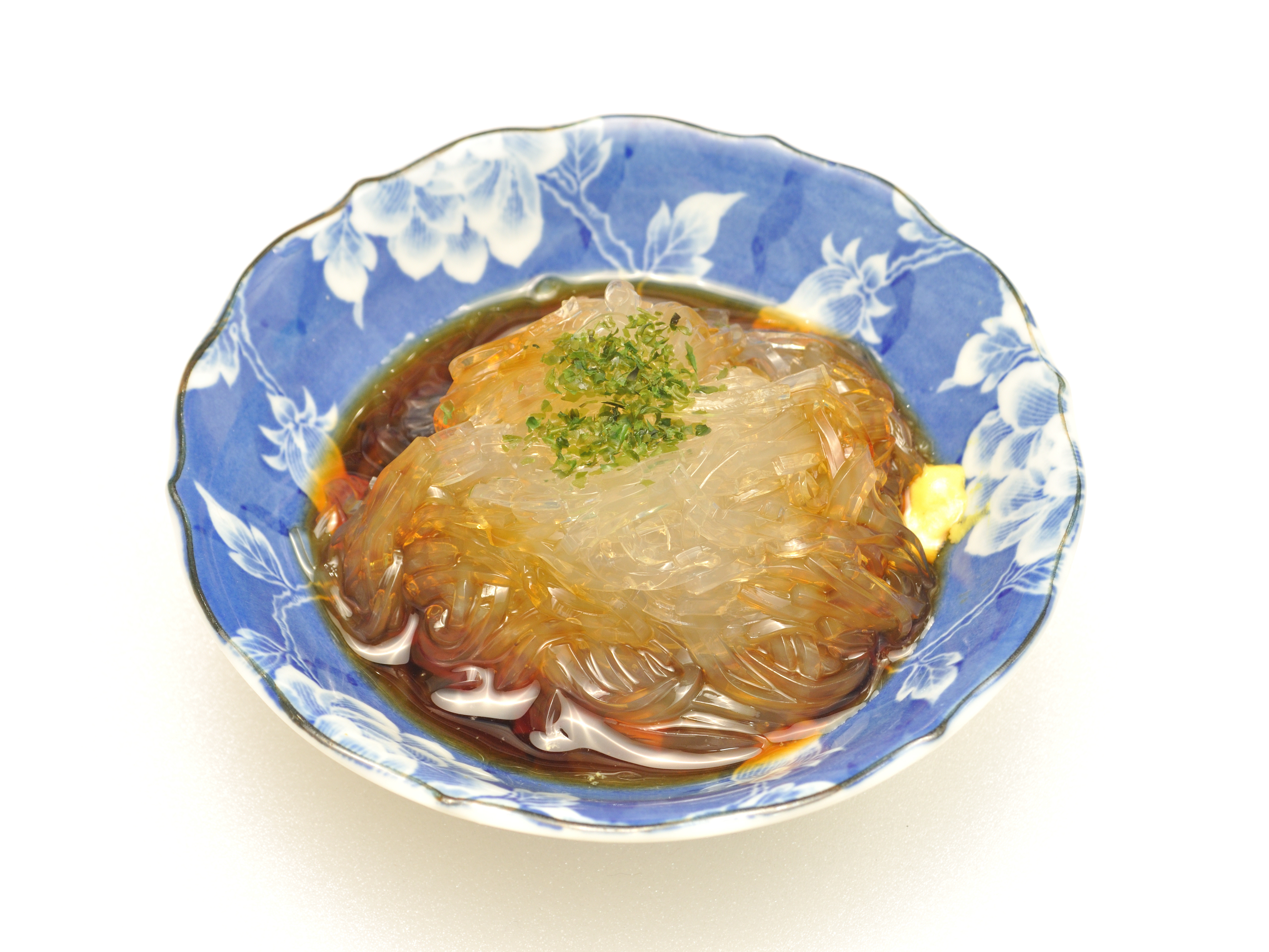
- Tokoroten with soy sauce
- Type: Wagashi
- Course: Side dish, dessert
- Place of origin: Japan
- Serving temperature: Hot, cold
- Main ingredients: Seaweed (tengusa, ogonori)

Tokoroten (心太, ところてん) is a gelatinous dish in Japanese cuisine, made from agarophyte seaweed. It was traditionally made by boiling tengusa (Gelidium amansii) and allowing the mixture to congeal into a jelly. The jelly is then pressed through an extruding device and shaped into noodles. Unlike gelatin desserts, tokoroten has a firmer texture.

Tokoroten can be eaten hot (in solution) or cold (as a gel). Flavorings and garnishes can vary from region to region. In the present day, it is common to eat it with a mixture of vinegar and soy sauce, and sometimes nori, hot pepper, or sesame. In the Kansai region, tokoroten is eaten as a dessert with kuromitsu syrup.

== History ==
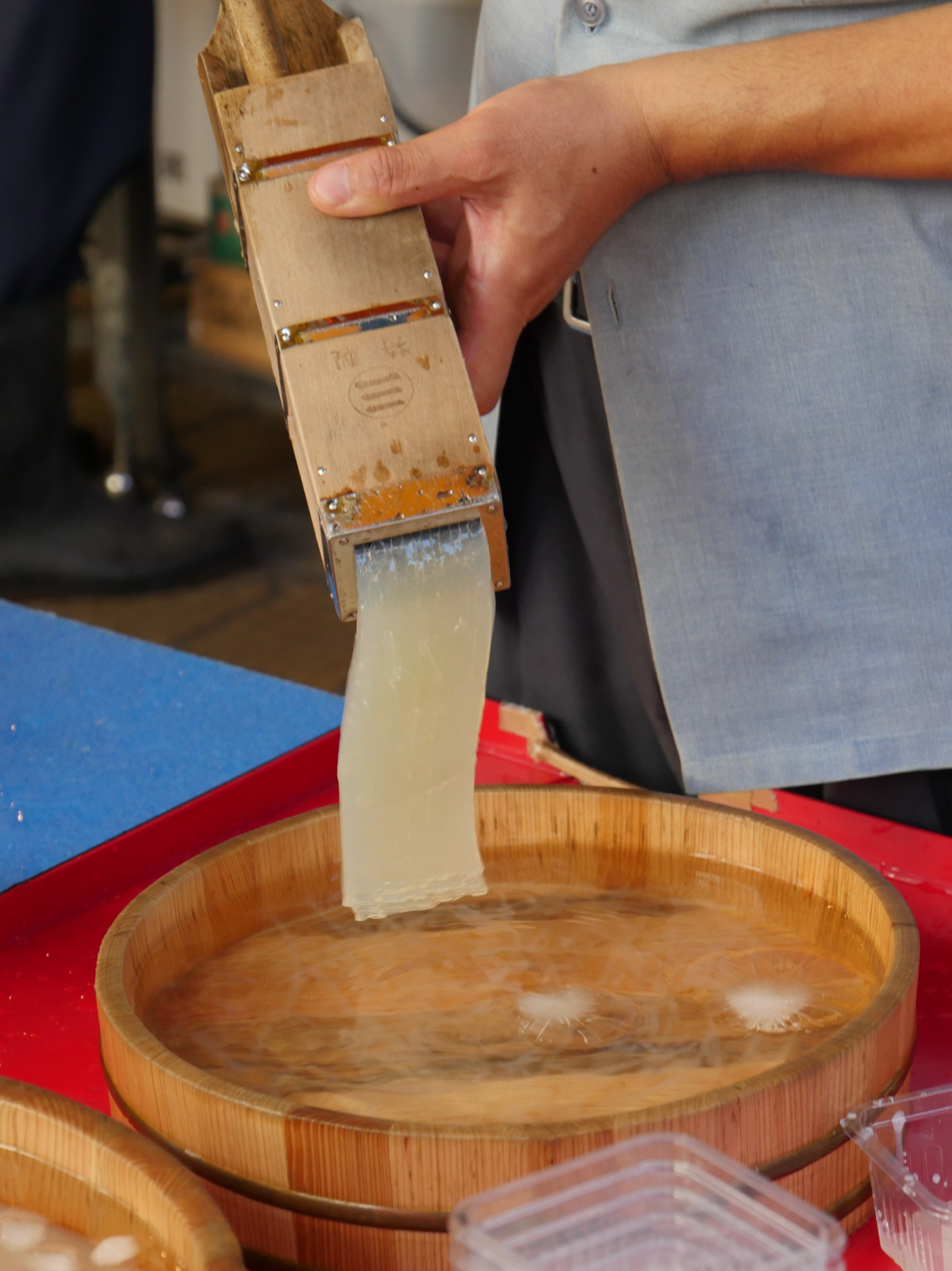
Tokoroten is made by extruding seaweed jelly through holes to form strips.

Tokoroten has been eaten in Japan for over a thousand years. It is thought to have been introduced to Japan from China during the Nara period.

During the Edo period, it was popular during the summer as a snack. It was originally made to be eaten immediately and was commonly sold around factories. In the 17th century, it was discovered that freezing tokoroten would result in a stable and dry product known as kanten (agar). While tokoroten can be made from kanten based on seaweeds such as tengusa (Gelidiaceae) and ogonori (Gracilaria), today, commercially produced kanten is mostly made from ogonori.

== Gallery ==
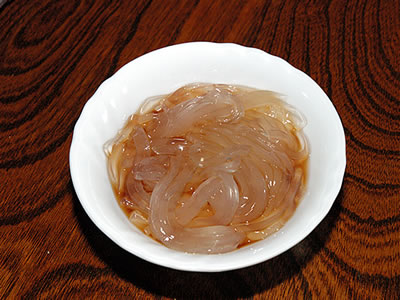

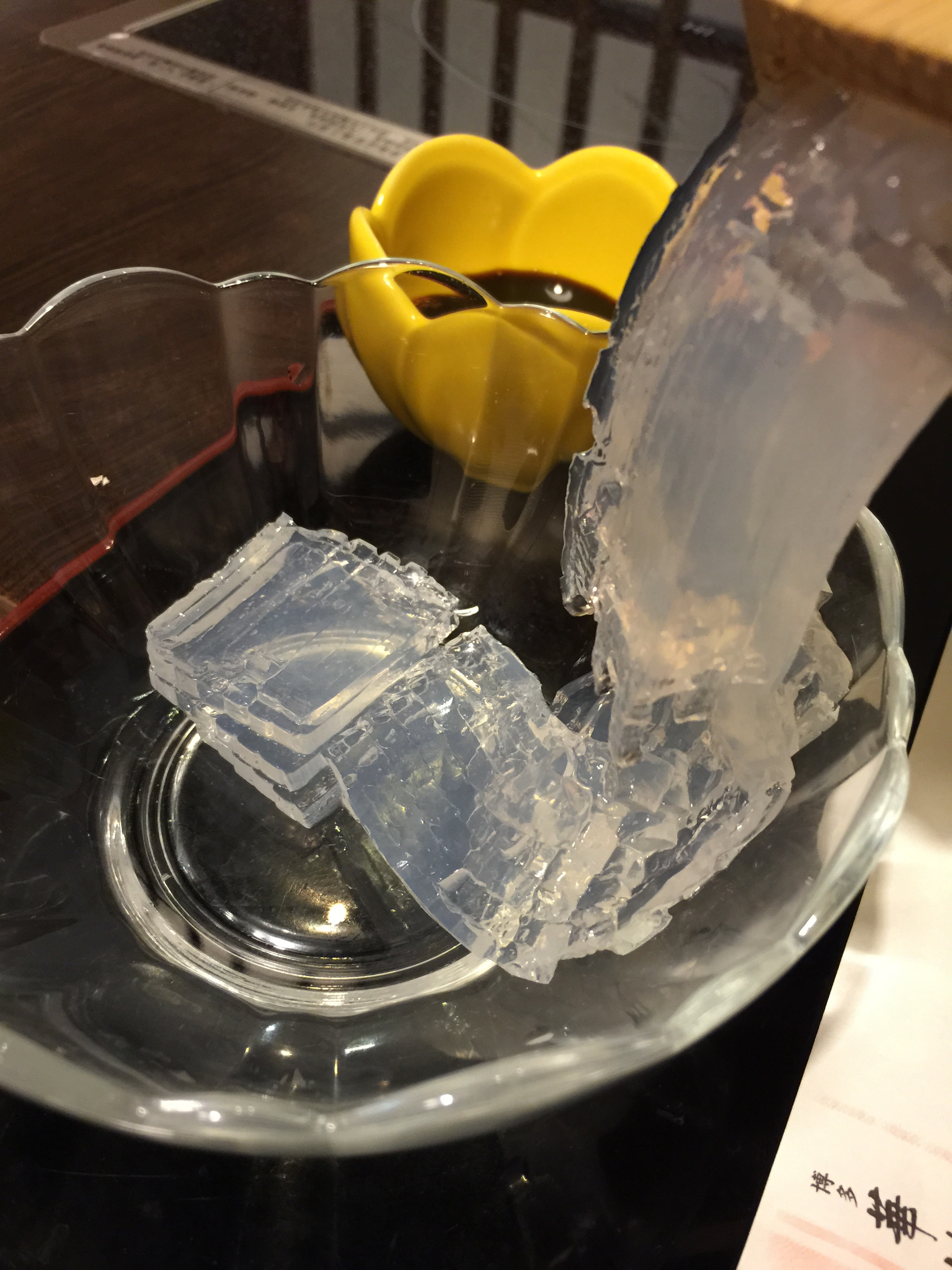

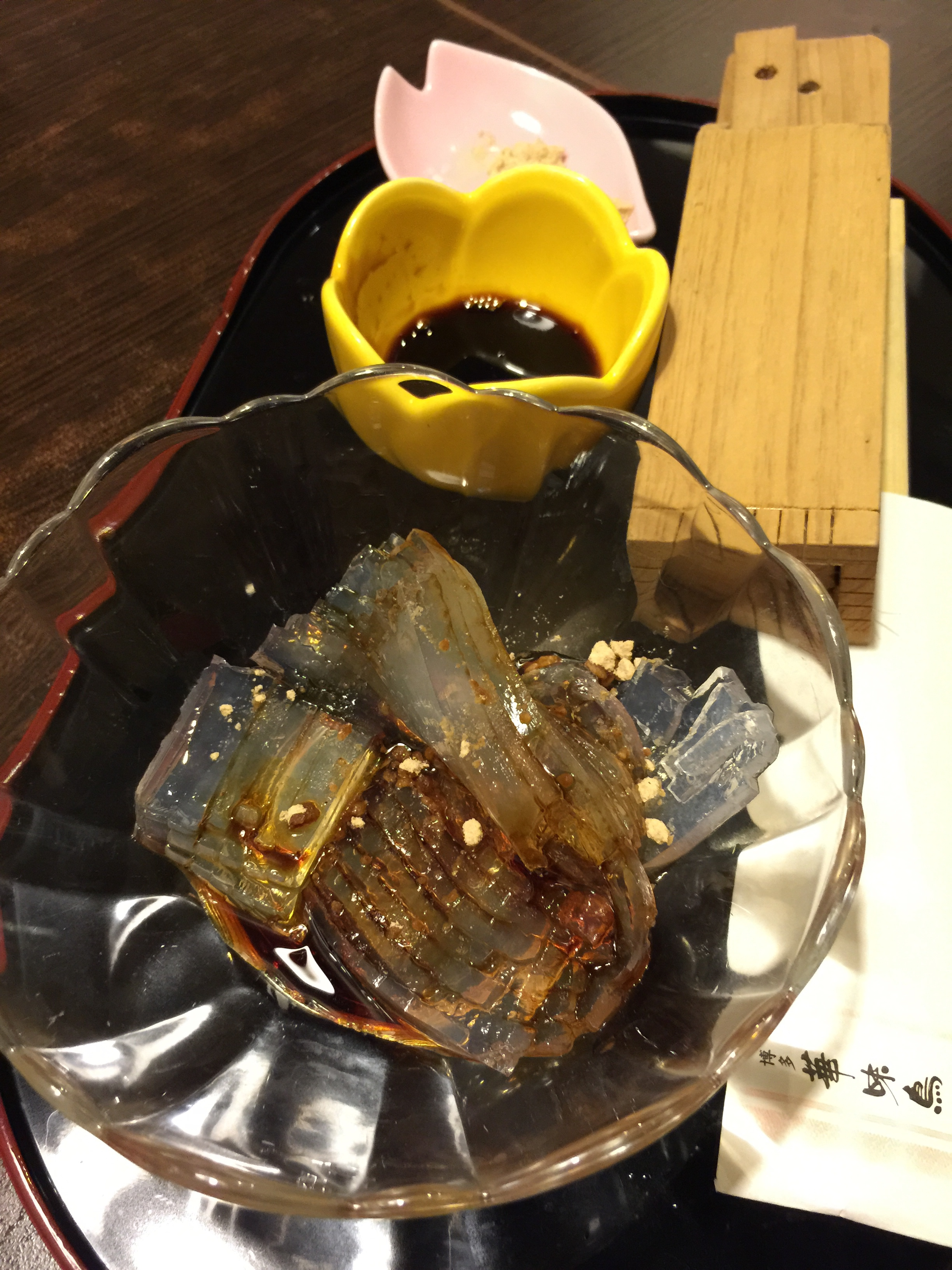

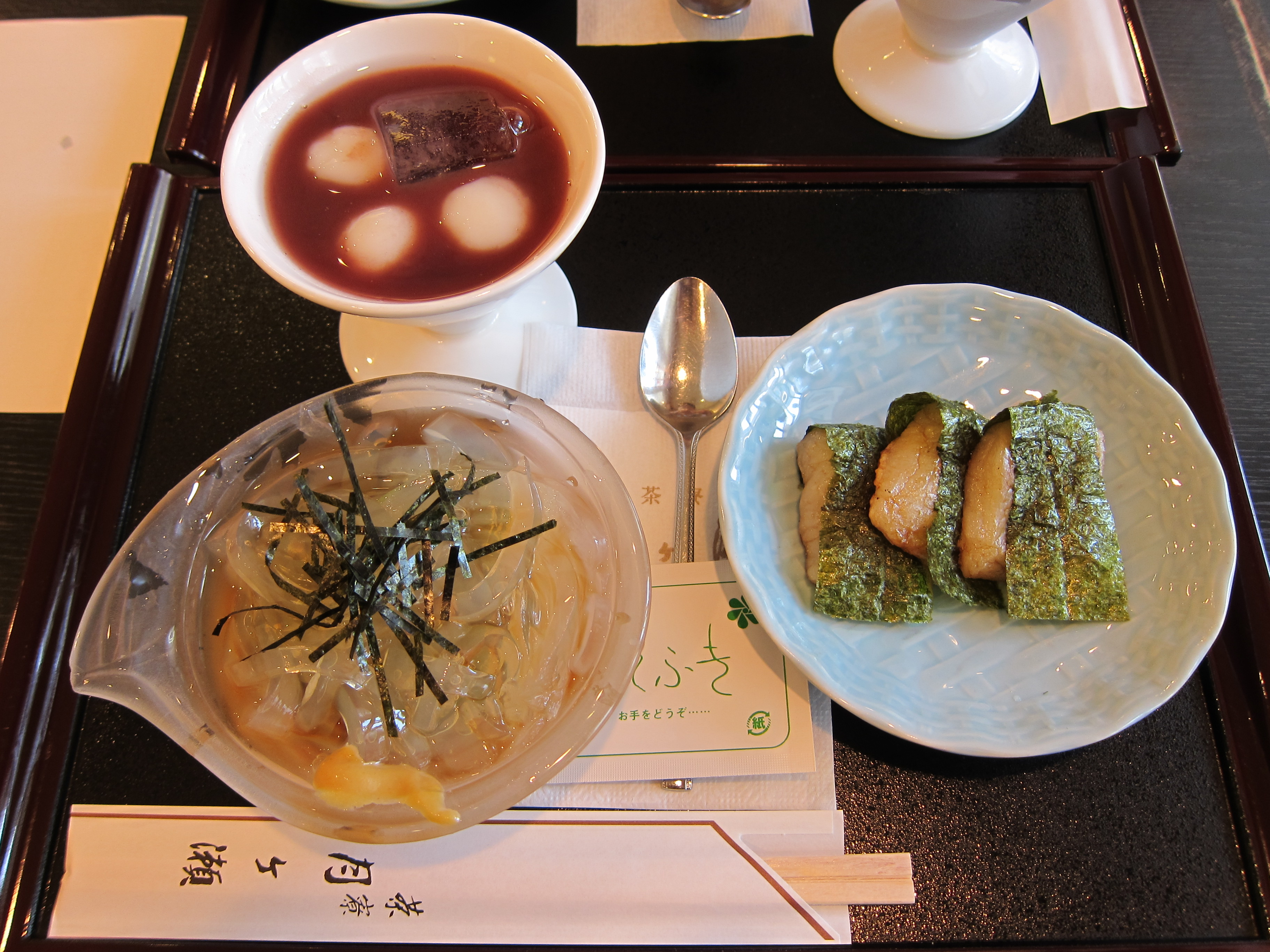
With shiruko and isobe-maki

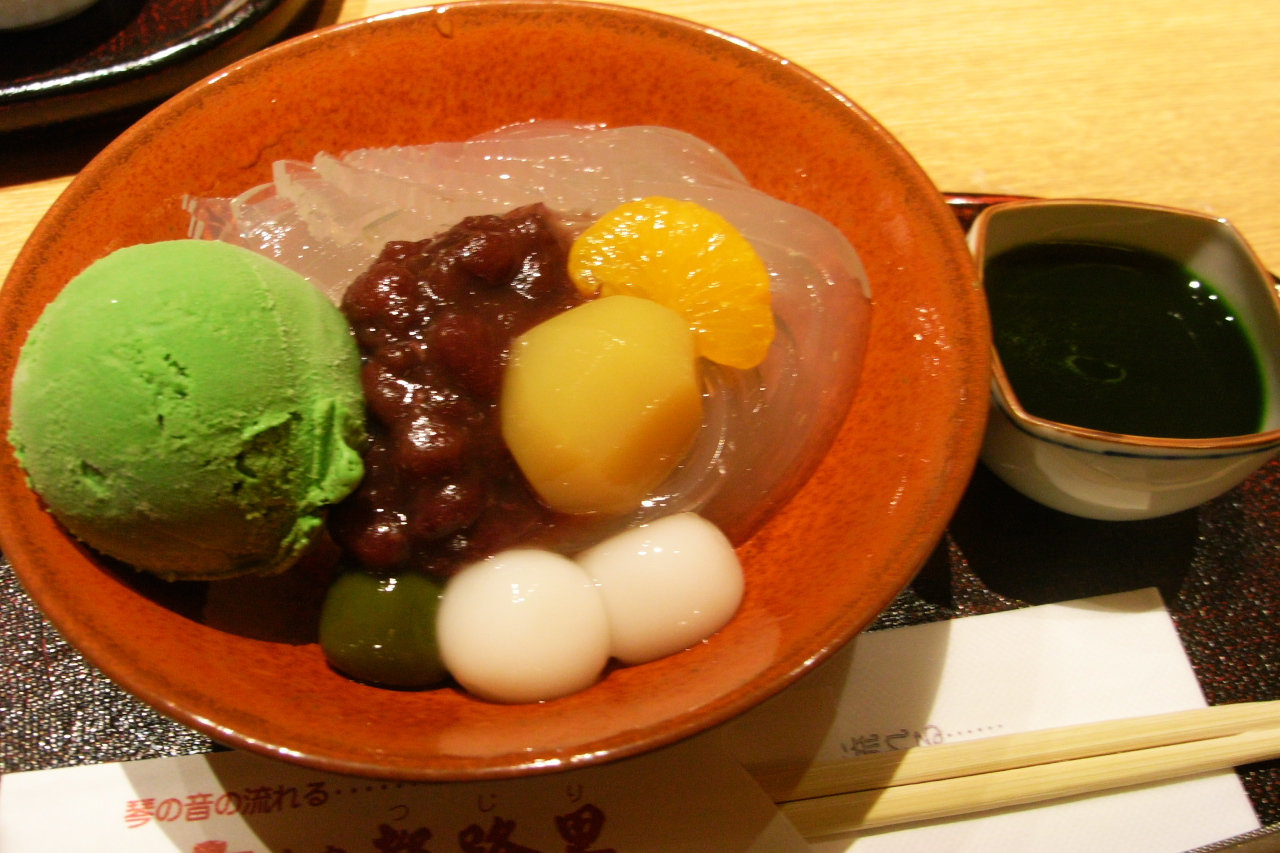
With matcha ice cream, azuki bean paste, and dango

== Sources ==
- Armisen, Rafael; Galatas, Fernando (1987). "Production, properties and uses of agar". In McHugh, Dennis J. (ed.). Production and Utilization of Products from Commercial Seaweeds. Food and Agriculture Organization. ISBN 9251026122. Archived from the original on 24 March 2017.
- Ito, Keiji; Hori, Kanji (1989). "Seaweed: Chemical composition and potential food uses". Food Reviews International. 5 (1): 101–144. doi:10.1080/87559128909540845.
- Mouritsen, Ole G. (2013). Seaweeds: Edible, Available, and Sustainable. The University of Chicago Press. ISBN 9780226044361.
- Shimamura, Natsu (4 August 2010). "Agar". The Tokyo Foundation.
- Stephen, Alistair M., ed. (1995). "Agars by Norman F. Stanley". Food Polysaccharides and Their Applications (1st ed.). Marcel Dekker – CRC Press. p. 198. ISBN 978-082479353-1. OCLC 32389736 – via Google Books. "search Tokoroten nori"
