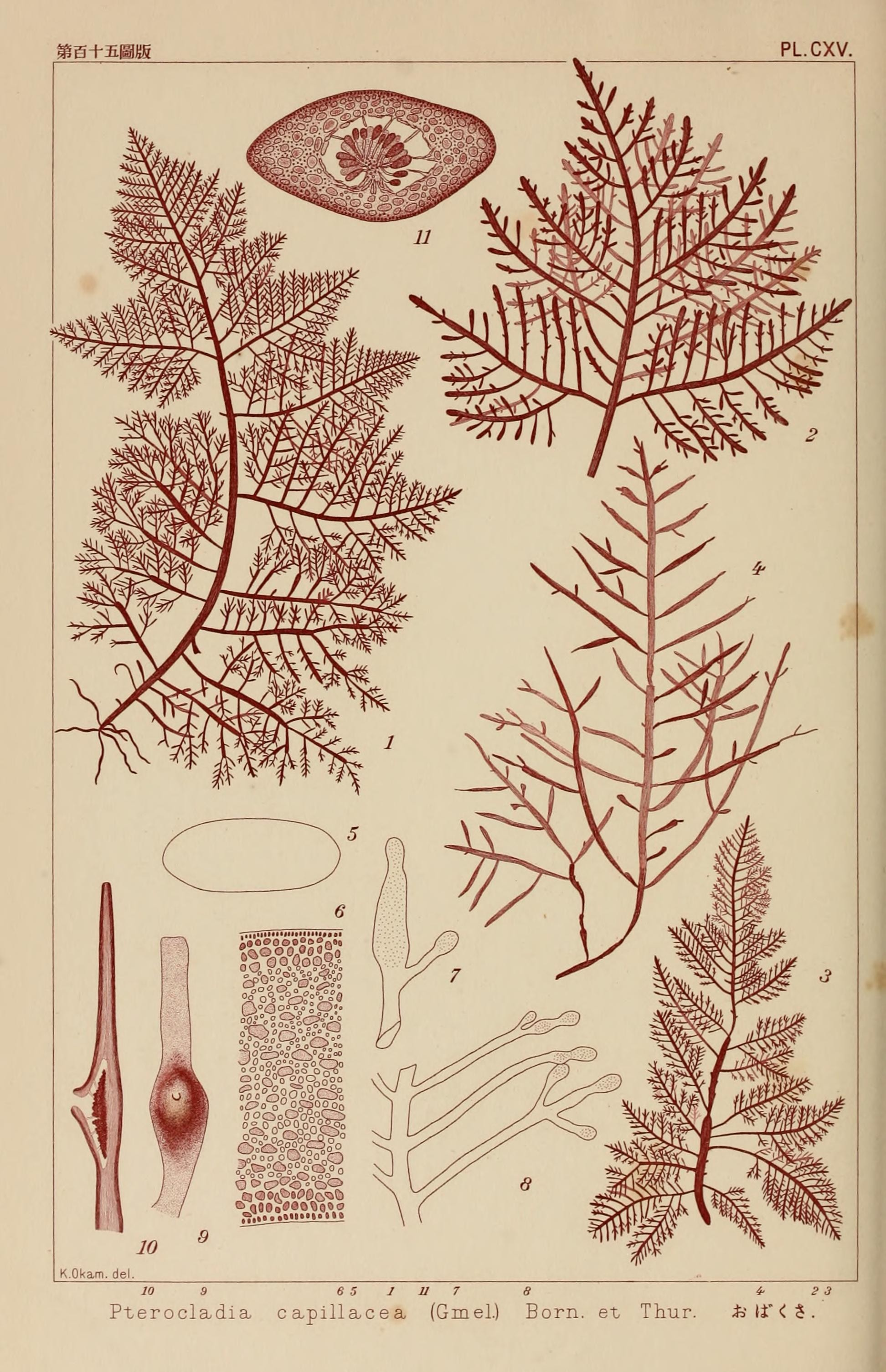
- Illustration of Pterocladia capillacea from Icones of Japanese algae, 1913

Scientific classification
- Domain: Eukaryota
- Clade: Archaeplastida
- Division: Rhodophyta
- Class: Florideophyceae
- Order: Gelidiales
- Family: Pterocladiaceae; Kung Chu Fan, 1961

= Pterocladiaceae =

Family of algae

The Pterocladiaceae is a small family of red algae containing 2 genera of agarophytes.

They are found growing on the coast of Portugal, South Africa, India, Japan, Mexico, Chile and New Zealand.

From the Gelidiales order, Gelidium J.V. Lamouroux and Pterocladia J. Agardh, are two of the most widespread genera (which have been often confused for each other) of the Gelidiaceae family. They are separated only by basic features of cystocarps (spore structures). The genus Pterocladiella Santelices et Hommersand was later established to segregate from Pterocladia those species with distinct carposporophyte developmental characters (Santelices and Hommersand 1997).

The family of Pterocladiaceae was derived in 2006 to hold the genera of Pterocladia and Pterocladiella. Molecular analyses of taxa within the Gelidiales identified four major lineages equivalent to Gelidiella, Pterocladia and Pterocladiella as sister taxa, and a fourth large clade including species of Acanthopeltis, Gelidium, Ptilophora, Porphyroglossum and Capreolia (Freshwater et al. 1995, Bailey and Freshwater 1997, Freshwater and Bailey 1998, Shimada et al. 1999).

The type genus is Pterocladia J. Agardh (1851: xi)

== Taxonomy ==
The family name of Pterocladiaceae is derived from the genus Pterocladia, which is derived from the Greek words pteron meaning wing and clados meaning branch.

== Genera ==
As accepted by GBIF;

- Pterocladia J.Agardh, 1851 (8)
  - Including P. lucida (R.Br. ex Turner) J.Agardh, 1851
- Pterocladiella B.Santelices & M.H.Hommersand, 1997 (14)

Figures in brackets are approx. how many species per genus.

== Uses ==
Agar can be derived from many types of red seaweeds, including those from families such as Gelidiaceae, Gracilariaceae, Gelidiellaceae and Pterocladiaceae (including Pterocladiella,). It is a polysaccharide located in the inner part of the red algal cell wall. It is used in food material, medicines, cosmetics, therapeutic and biotechnology industries.

== Other sources ==
- Kamiya, M., Lindstrom, S.C., Nakayama, T., Yokoyama, A., Lin, S.-M., Guiry, M.D., Gurgel, F.D.G., Huisman, J.M., Kitayama, T., Suzuki, M., Cho, T.O. & Frey, W. 2017. Rhodophyta. In: Syllabus of Plant Families, 13th ed. Part 2/2: Photoautotrophic eukaryotic Algae. (Frey, W. Eds), pp. [i]–xii, [1]–171. Stuttgart: Borntraeger Science Publishers. ISBN 978-3-443-01094-2.
