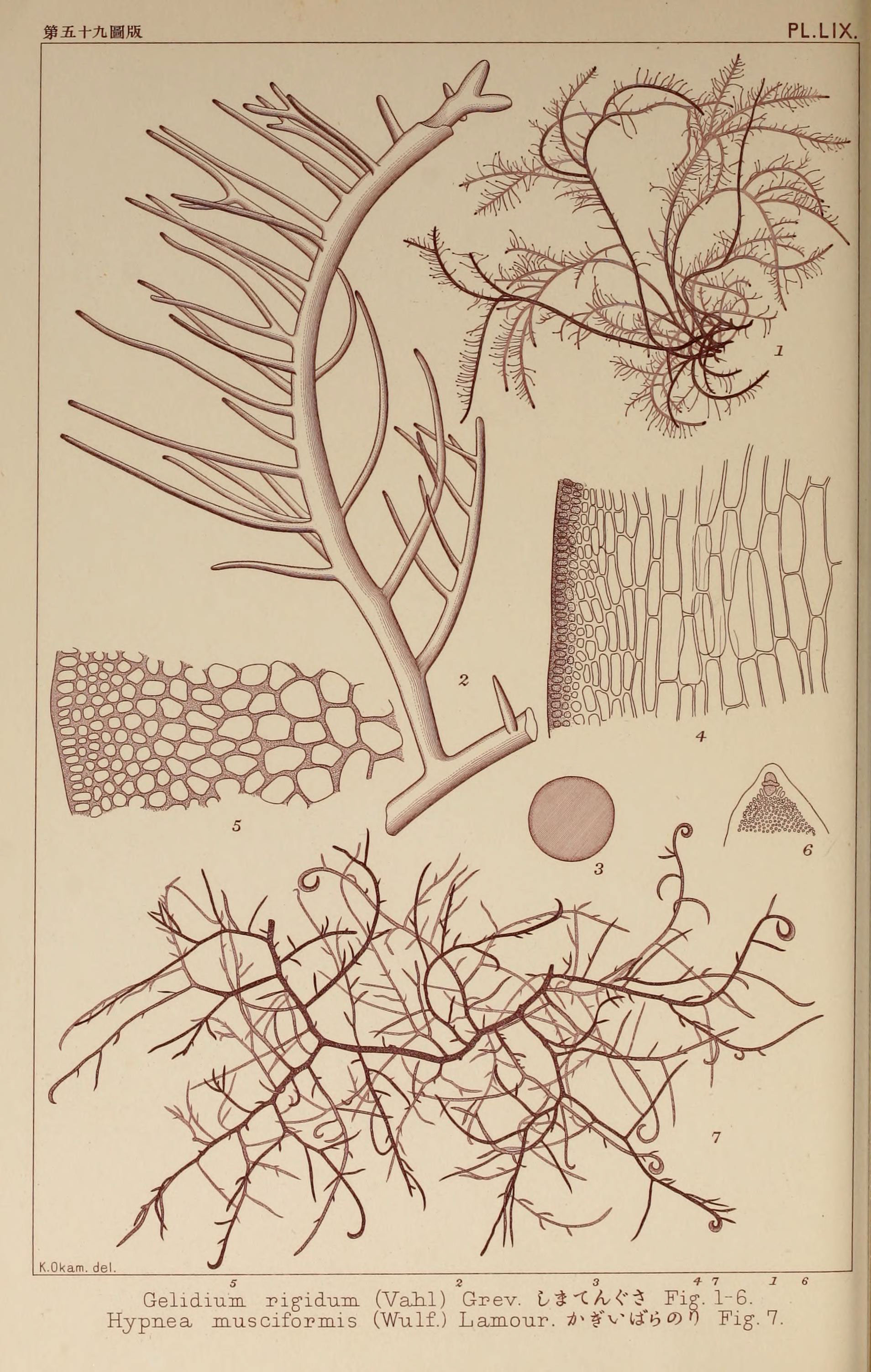
- Illustration of Gelidium rigidum (Vail) Grev. L (now Gelidiella acerosa) and Hypnea musciformis (Wulf.) Lamour.

Scientific classification
- Domain: Eukaryota
- Clade: Archaeplastida
- Division: Rhodophyta
- Class: Florideophyceae
- Order: Gelidiales
- Family: Gelidiellaceae; Kung Chu Fan, 1961

= Gelidiellaceae =

Family of algae

The Gelidiellaceae is a small family of red algae containing 5 genera of agarophytes.

Members of the family Gelidiellaceace are noted by the lack of hyphae and the lack of sexual reproduction. They have 2 kinds of tetrasporangial sori (either the acerosa-type or the pannosa-type).

Gelidiella acerosa is found worldwide, from Europe, North America, Central America and South America, the Atlantic Islands, Africa, Indian Ocean islands, South west Asia, Asia (including China, Japan and Taiwan), South-east Asia (including Vietnam, Myanmar, Thailand, Singapore, Philippines and Indonesia), Australia, New Zealand and the Pacific islands.

== Taxonomy ==
It was originally formed in 1961, to hold Gelidiella and (its single known species, Gelidiella acerosa), as it lacked a medullary hyphae (or rhizines) and lack of sexual phase in life. More species of Gelidiella from France and the British Isles were added. In 1987, Maggs and Guiry thought that the family should be merged with Gelidiaceae, but this was mostly ignored by later authors. Then Parviphycus was added in 2004, but then in 2016, three more genera were added Huismaniella, Millerella and Perronella.

== Genera ==
As accepted by GBIF;

- Gelidiella Feldmann & G.Hamel, 1934 (10)
- Huismaniella G.H.Boo & S.M.Boo, 2016 (1)
- Millerella G.H.Boo & S.M.Boo, 2016 (3)
- Parviphycus Santelices, 2004 (8)
- Perronella G.H.Boo, T.V.Nguyen, J.Y.Kim & S.M.Boo, 2016

Figures in brackets are approx. how many species per genus.

== Uses ==
Agar can be derived from many types of red seaweeds, including those from families such as Gelidiaceae, Gracilariaceae, Gelidiellaceae and Pterocladiaceae. It is a polysaccharide located in the inner part of the red algal cell wall. It is used in food material, medicines, cosmetics, therapeutic and biotechnology industries.
