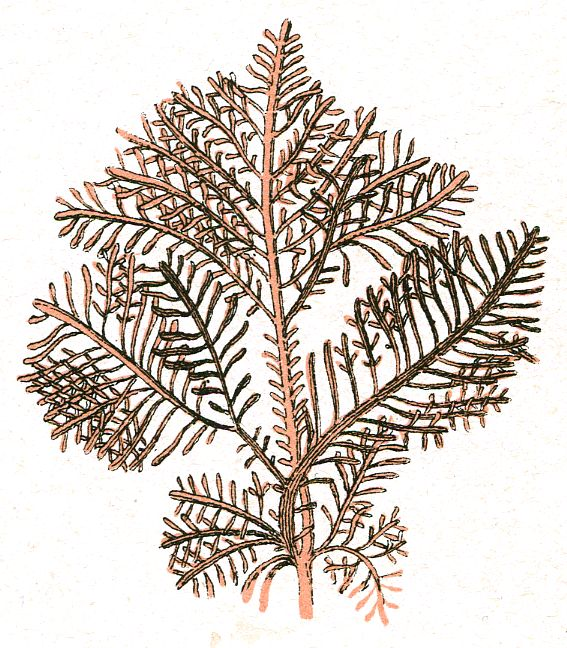
- Gelidium corneum

Scientific classification
- Domain: Eukaryota
- Clade: Archaeplastida
- Division: Rhodophyta
- Class: Florideophyceae
- Order: Gelidiales
- Family: Gelidiaceae; Kützing, 1843

Genera
- Acanthopeltis Okamura, 1892; Capreolia Guiry & Womersley, 1993; Gelidiophycus G.H.Boo, J.K.Park & S.M.Boo, 2013; Gelidium J.V. Lamouroux, 1813; Onikusa Akatsuka, 1986; Porphyroglossum Kützing, 1847; Ptilophora Kützing, 1847; Yatabella Okamura, 1900; Acrocarpus Kützing, 1843 (nomen dubium)

= Gelidiaceae =

Family of algae

The Gelidiaceae is a small family of red algae containing eight genera. Many species of this algae are used to make agar.

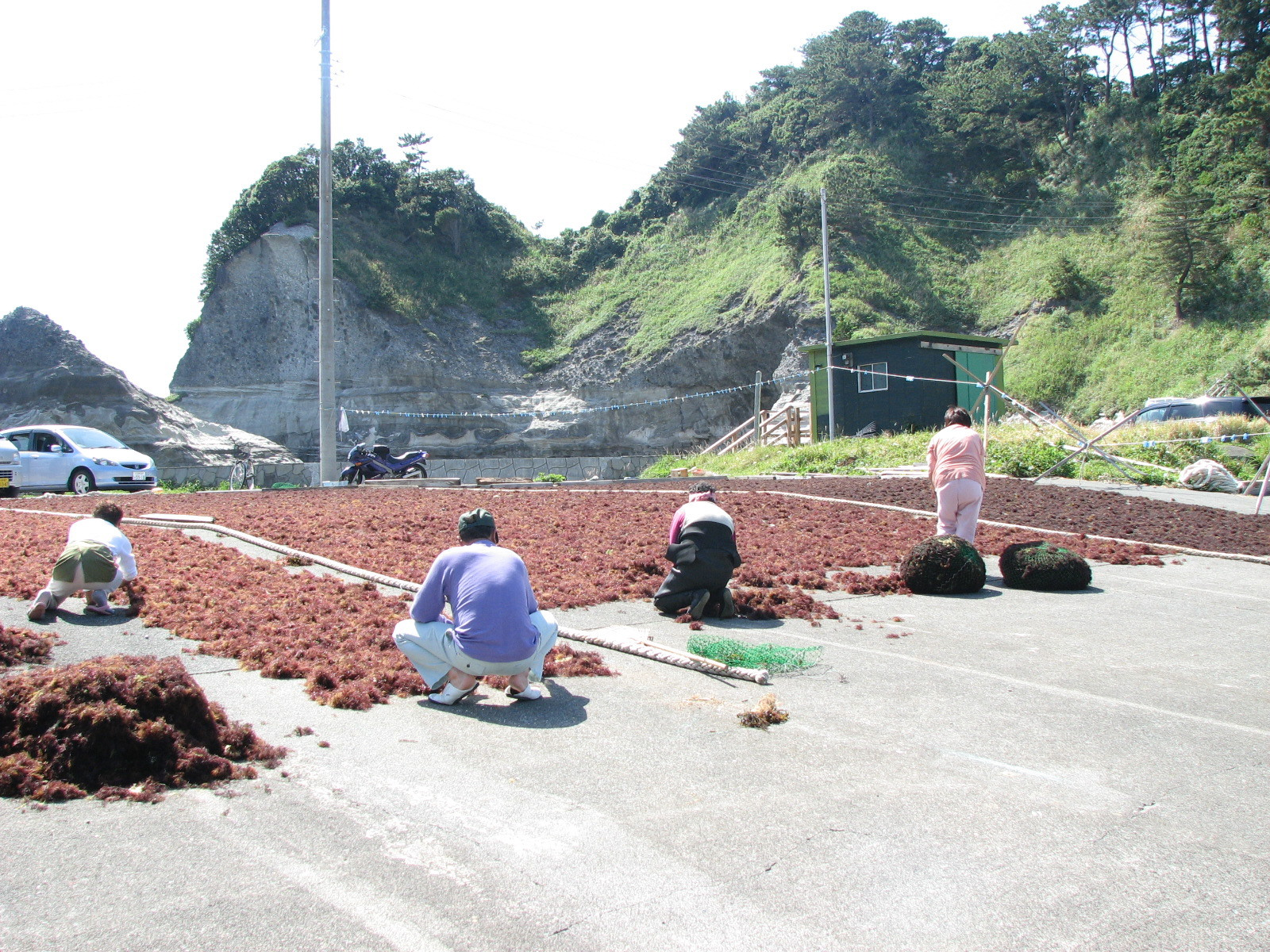
Drying Gelidium amansii to make agar

== Uses ==
Agar can be derived from many types of red seaweeds, including those from families such as Gelidiaceaae, Gracilariaceae, Gelidiellaceae and Pterocladiaceae. It is a polysaccharide located in the inner part of the red algal cell wall. It is used in food material, medicines, cosmetics, therapeutic and biotechnology industries.
