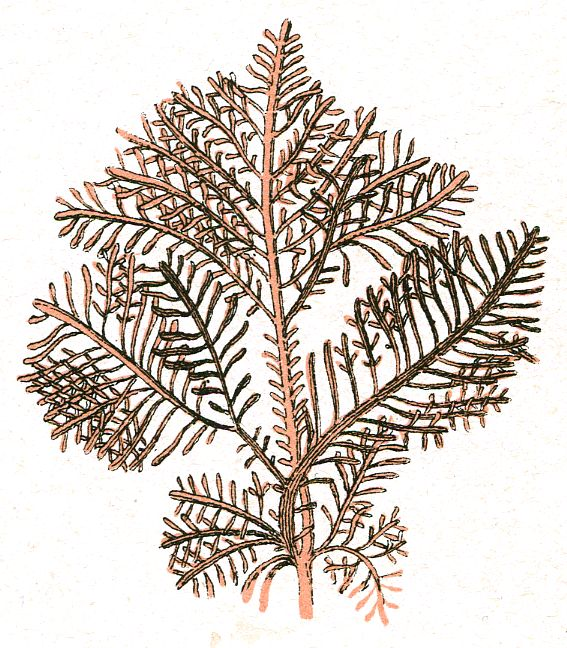
- Gelidium corneum

Scientific classification
- Clade: Archaeplastida
- Division: Rhodophyta
- Class: Florideophyceae
- Subclass: Rhodymeniophycidae
- Order: Gelidiales; Kylin

Families
- Gelidiaceae; Gelidiellaceae; Orthogonacladiaceae; Pterocladiaceae

= Gelidiales =

Order of algae

The Gelidiales is a small order of red algae containing ten genera, and approximately 130–160 species, many of which are used to make agar.
