= Olstad Glacier =

Glacier in Antarctica

- Location of Peter Island in Antarctica

- Location within Antarctica
- Type: heavily crevassed
- Location: Palmer Archipelago
- Coordinates: 68°50′S 90°41′W
- Length: 2 nmi (4 km; 2 mi)
- Thickness: unknown
- Terminus: Tofte Glacier
- Status: unknown

Olstad Glacier (68°50′S 90°41′W) is a heavily crevassed glacier descending to the west coast of Peter I Island about 2 nautical miles (3.7 km) south of Tofte Glacier. Peter I Island was circumnavigated by the Norwegian whale catcher Odd I in January 1927 and was explored from the Norvegia in February 1929.

The glacier is named for Ola Olstad, Norwegian zoologist who, transported by various whaling ships, conducted research in South Georgia, South Shetland Islands and Palmer Archipelago in 1927–28. Olstad partook in the first expedition to land on Peter I Island, the second Norvegia expedition, in February 1929.

== See also ==
- List of glaciers in the Antarctic
- Glaciology
