= Tvistein Pillars =

Rock formation near Antarctica

Tvistein Pillars (68°42′S 90°40′W) are two flat-topped pillar rocks standing 1 nautical mile (1.9 km) southwest of Cape Eva, the north extremity of Peter I Island, off the coast of Antarctica. The rocks were sighted from the Odd I by a Norwegian expedition under Eyvind Tofte in 1927. The name Tvistein (two stones) was applied by a Norwegian expedition under Nils Larsen which charted the island from the Norvegia in 1929.
