= Sandefjord Cove =

Cove located on Peter I Island, Antarctica

Coordinates: 68°47′S 90°42′W

Sandefjord Cove Sandefjord Bay
- Cove
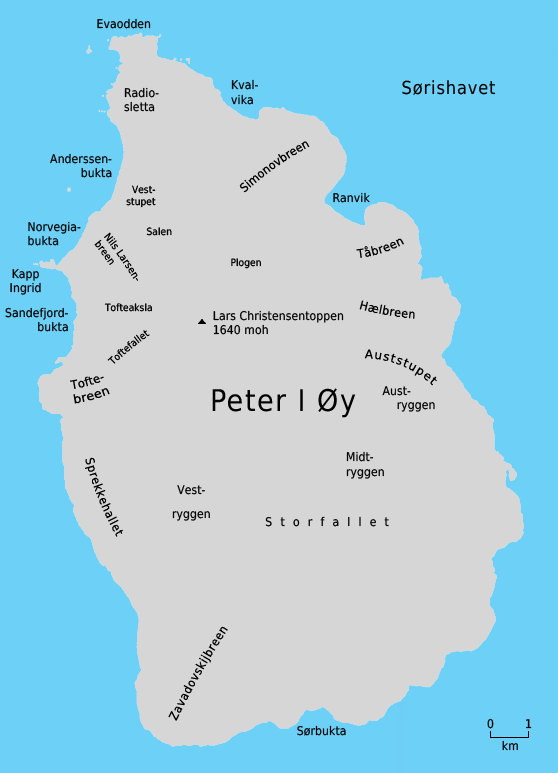
- Man of Peter I island with Sandefjord Cove being located on the west below Cape Ingrid.
- Interactive map of Sandefjord Cove
- Location: Peter I island

Sandefjord Cove (sometimes called Sandefjord Bay) is a cove between Cape Ingrid and the terminus of Tofte Glacier on the west side of Peter I Island.

A Norwegian expedition under Eyvind Tofte circumnavigated Peter I Island in the Odd I in 1927. In February 1929, the Norvegia under Nils Larsen carried out a series of investigations all around the island, landing on February 2 to hoist the Norwegian flag. The cove was named for Sandefjord, Norway, center of the Norwegian whaling industry.

== Framnes Head ==
Framnes Head is a small rock point forming one of the headlands of the cove. dIt was charted and named by Larsen's expedition. It is steep and rugged, composed of lava and basaltic tuff. When members of the US Navy Second Antarctic Development Project landed there in 1948, they discovered a small colony of Adelie penguins.
