= Nils Larsen Glacier =

Glacier in Antarctica

- Interactive map of Nils Larsen Glacier
- Location: Peter I Island

Nils Larsen Glacier (68°50′S 90°35′W) is a glacier descending to the west coast of Peter I Island close northward of Norvegia Bay. In February 1929 the crew of the Norvegia carried out a series of investigations of this island, landing on February 2. Named for Nils Larsen, captain of the Norvegia.
