= Lazarev Coast =

Coordinates: 68°51′S 90°44′W

The Lazarev Coast (Norwegian: Lazarevkysten; Russian: берег Лазарева, Лазаревский берег) is a coastal area in Antarctic. It is located on the southern side of the Bellingshausen Sea, on the Peter I Island.

The 19 km long coast from the W point of cape Eva in the N, to the point of Zavodovskijbreen in the S, W on Peter I øy. After lieutenant Mikhail P. Lazarev, commander of the sloop Mirnyj on the first Russian Antarctic expedition 1819-21, which discovered the island 20. January 1821.
