= Cecil Cave =

Antarctica's sea cave

Cecil Cave (68°46′S 90°42′W) is a sea cave which indents the southern part of Cape Ingrid on the west coast of Peter I Island in Antarctica. It was discovered and named by a Norwegian expedition under Eyvind Tofte in the Odd I in January 1927. Tofte and the second mate rowed into the cave in an unsuccessful attempt to land on the island.
