= Mount Nils =

Mountain in Enderby Land, Antarctica

Mount Nils (68°4′S 48°1′E) is a prominent, ice-covered mountain standing close west of Rayner Glacier and 3 nautical miles (6 km) south of Mount Christensen, Enderby Land. It was plotted from air photos taken by ANARE (Australian National Antarctic Research Expeditions) in 1956 and 1957 and was named by the Antarctic Names Committee of Australia (ANCA) for Captain Nils Larsen, master of the Norwegian exploration ship January 1930.
