= Cape Eva =

North end of Peter I Island, Antarctica

Cape Eva (68°42′S 90°37′W) is a cape forming the north end of Peter I Island. It was discovered and named in 1927 by a Norwegian expedition in the Odd I under Eyvind Tofte.

== See also ==
- Tvistein Pillars
