= Lars Christensen Peak =

Volcano in Antarctica

- Location within Antarctica

Highest point
- Elevation: 1,640 m (5,380 ft)
- Prominence: 1,640 m (5,380 ft)
- Listing: Ultra, Ribu
- Coordinates: 68°50′S 90°37′W

Geography
- Location: Peter I Island, Southern Ocean

Geology
- Mountain type: Shield volcano

Lars Christensen Peak, also known as Lars Christensentoppen, is the highest point at 1,640 metres (5,381 ft) on Peter I Island, off the coast of Antarctica.

The peak is a shield volcano. It is not known whether it is extinct or not, for the upper part is apparently unmodified by glaciation.

The peak owes its name to Lars Christensen, the shipowner of the SS Odd I, a whaler that circumnavigated the island in January 1927.

== See also ==
- List of volcanoes in Antarctica
- List of volcanoes in Norway
