= Ranvika =

Body of water in Antarctica

Coordinates: 68°44′S 90°30′W

Ranvika is a cove on the east coast of Peter I Island, in the Bellingshausen Sea off the coast of the Antarctic.

The island was discovered in 1927 by a Norwegian expedition on the SS Odd I commanded by Eyvind Tofte. The bay may be named after Ranvik, a bay in Norway, the site of the estate of Lars Christensen, sponsor of the expedition.
