= Tofte Glacier =

Subantarctic glacier

Coordinates: 68°48′S 90°42′W

Tofte Glacier is a glacier immediately south of Sandefjord Cove on the west side of Peter I Island. Discovered in 1927 by a Norwegian expedition in the SS Odd I and named for Eyvind Tofte, leader of the expedition.
