= Mount Norvegia =

Mountain in Enderby Land, Antarctica

Mount Norvegia (67°51′S 48°8′E) is a large ice-covered mountain, 1,340 m, standing 6 nautical miles (11 km) north of Mount Christensen, Enderby Land. It was plotted from air photos taken by ANARE (Australian National Antarctic Research Expeditions) aircraft in 1956 and 1957 and was named after the Norwegian exploration ship, Norvegia, which was off Enderby Land in December 1929-January 1930.
