= Papua New Guinean passport =

Passport of the Independent State of Papua New Guinea issued to Papuan citizens

- The front cover of a Papua New Guinean passport
- Type: Passport
- Issued by: Papua New Guinea
- Purpose: Identification
- Eligibility: Papua New Guinean citizenship
- Expiration: 5 years after date of issue
- Cost: K100

The Papua New Guinean passport is issued to citizens of Papua New Guinea for international travel.

The passport is issued by the Passport Branch of the Papua New Guinea Immigration & Citizenship Service Authority.

According to the Henley Visa Index 2024 Report, Papua New Guinea citizens can travel to 85 countries visa free. Papua New Guinean citizens are ranked 64th in terms of freedom of travel in the world.

== Physical appearance ==
Papua New Guinea passport cover in blue. The country's coat of arms is in the middle of the cover. Under the coat of arms are the name of the country (Papua New Guinea) and the name of the document (PASSPORT). The passport is 48 pages long and is written in English.

=== Identification page ===
- Passport holder photo (Width: 35 mm, Height: 45 mm; Head height (up to the top of the hair): 34.5 mm; Distance from the top of the photo to the top of the hair: 3 mm)
- Type ("P" for passport)
- Code of the country
- Serial number of the passport
- Surname and first name of the passport holder
- Citizenship
- Date of birth (DD.MM.YYYY)
- Gender (M for men or F for women)
- Place of Birth
- Date of issue (DD.MM.YYYY)
- Passport holder's signature
- Expiry date (DD.MM.YYYY)

== See also ==
- Visa requirements for Papua New Guinean citizens
- Visa policy of Papua New Guinea
