= APEC Business Travel Card =

Travel document

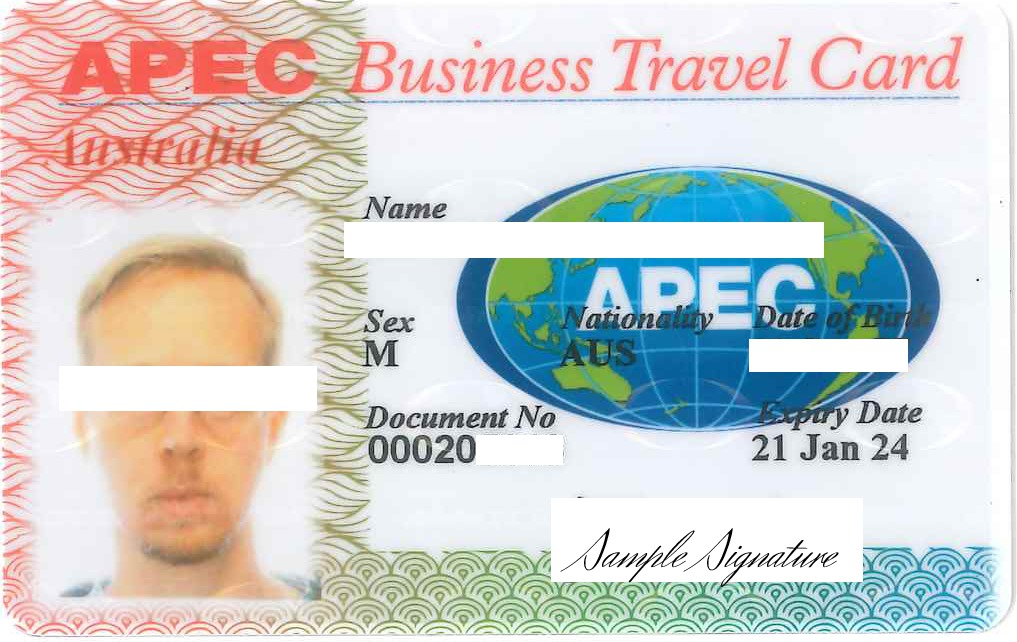
Sample of an Australian APEC Business Travel Card issued in 2019

The APEC Business Travel Card (ABTC) is a travel document issued to business travellers who are citizens of APEC member economies. Valid for five years, the card removes the need for visas when travelling to other APEC member economies, provided the holder has completed the necessary pre-clearance during the application process.

In 2021, the Virtual APEC Business Travel Card (VABTC) was introduced, offering the same benefits via a mobile application. Virtual cards are intended to replace physical cards entirely, though each participating economy will determine its own timeline for doing so. As of 2023, all APEC economies except Russia accept the VABTC for entry.

== Participating APEC economies and application process ==
Full members of the scheme Transitional members (Canada, United States)

Nineteen of the twenty-one APEC economies are full participating economies in the APEC Business Travel Card programme:

- Australia
- Brunei
- Chile
- China
- Hong Kong, China
- Indonesia
- Japan
- South Korea
- Malaysia
- Mexico
- New Zealand
- Papua New Guinea
- Peru
- Philippines
- Russia
- Singapore
- Taiwan (as Chinese Taipei)
- Thailand
- Vietnam

Transitional members:

- Canada
- United States

Russia became a full participant on 1 June 2013.

Citizens of these economies may apply for an APEC Business Travel Card through their home government. The general requirement is that applicants be business people who need to travel frequently for short-term visits within the APEC region. However, the criteria for approval vary by economy. For example, Hong Kong accepts applications from all permanent resident bona fide business people. Australia, by contrast, limits participation to representatives of businesses involved in international trade or investment between APEC economies, those who have received an Export Market Development Grant from Austrade in the preceding five years, those listed on the current Forbes Global 2000, or those who satisfy similar criteria.

After an application is accepted and the card is issued, pre-clearance still needs to be granted individually by each participating economy, and it may take three to four months for all member economies to respond. Previously, APEC offered a fast-track option for the issuance of an interim card covering up to five "priority economies" of the applicant's choice. With the virtual ABTC, pre-clearances become available in the app as soon as they are granted.

Canada and the United States are transitional members. This status permits them to issue APEC Business Travel Cards to their own citizens and nationals. It grants their cardholders access to expedited visa appointments and immigration clearance in other participating economies. However, these cardholders do not receive additional visa-free travel privileges. Canada and the United States are likewise not obliged to grant visa-free status to APEC cardholders from other economies. The United States began accepting applications for ABTCs in June 2014, while Canada announced in October 2013 that it would launch a limited-participation trial programme.

A citizen of a third-party country, including the United States and Canada, who is also a permanent resident of Hong Kong, may apply for an APEC card through the Hong Kong Immigration Department. This exception is not available in any other member economy.

== Physical appearance ==
The card is issued in credit-card-sized ID-1 format, is machine-readable, and contains the following fields:

- Name
- Sex
- Economy [name of the member economy]
- Date of Birth
- Expiry Date
- Signature
- Passport number

Apart from the name of the member economy, the card bears no national symbols. The reverse of the card lists the member economies for which clearance has been approved. The machine-readable strip begins with "CP", followed by the abbreviation of the issuing economy. These abbreviations conform to the three-letter ISO 3166-1 alpha-3 country codes. Although Taiwan participates under the name Chinese Taipei, the abbreviation TWN is used.

== Use ==
Since September 2015, the card has been valid for five years (previously three). After five years, a fresh application is required. If the holder's passport is renewed during this period, the card must be reissued with the updated passport number. As of February 2014, approximately 500,000 ABTCs were in active use.

The card must be presented alongside a passport and confers the following advantages:

- No requirement to apply for a visa or entry permit, as the card is treated as such (except by transitional members)
- Multiple short-term entries, with a maximum stay of between 59 and 90 days
- Expedited border clearance in all member economies, including transitional members

The visa-free arrangement does not apply to Chinese citizens of the Hong Kong Special Administrative Region for entry into mainland China. These citizens should continue to use the Mainland Travel Permit for Hong Kong and Macau Residents for such entry.
It also does not apply to ABTC holders from Hong Kong for entry to Taiwan.

== Country-specific information ==
=== Australia ===
As Australia is a full participating member of the scheme, Australian citizens who are frequent bona fide business travellers may apply for a card online through the Department of Home Affairs. Foreign cardholders may visit Australia visa-free for up to 90 days, and dedicated fast-track lanes are available to them at airports in Adelaide, Brisbane, Cairns, Darwin, Melbourne, Perth and Sydney.

To be eligible for an ABTC, Australian citizens must meet the following criteria:

- They travel frequently to an APEC economy for business purposes.
- They have no conviction for a criminal offence.
- Their business entity is engaged in international trade or investment between APEC economies. This is demonstrated if the business:
  - has received an Export Market Development Grant from Austrade in the preceding five years,
  - has been a finalist in the Australian Export Awards in the preceding five years,
  - is listed on the current Forbes Global 2000,
  - trades goods, services or conducts investment activities between APEC economies, or
  - is a start-up operation for which there is clear evidence of viability, sound business planning, market research and products or services to be traded.

=== Canada ===
Although Canada is not a full participant in the scheme, cardholders are eligible to use dedicated lanes at major international airports upon arrival, but remain subject to the standard entry and visa requirements. At the APEC Indonesia 2013 summit, Canadian Prime Minister Stephen Harper announced that his country would launch a pilot programme permitting Canadian citizens who were members of NEXUS to apply for ABTCs.

In June 2014, the Canada Border Services Agency published a final rule on the issuance of ABTCs to Canadian citizens. Applicants must already be enrolled in the NEXUS programme, and may apply through the GOES portal, the same US CBP-operated website used for other American trusted traveller schemes.

As Canada is only a transitional member of the ABTC scheme and does not extend any visa waiver to ABTC holders from other economies, Canadian citizens do not, reciprocally, enjoy any additional visa-free travel through the scheme. They do, however, qualify for expedited visa appointment procedures for those economies that require visas for Canadian citizens, and may use specially marked ABTC lanes at airports.

=== China ===
The People's Republic of China has accepted virtual ABTCs since 1 May 2023. The 'CHN' notification is reinstated for ABTC holders who have received pre-clearance from China.

Ahead of APEC China 2026, China announced that starting November 1, 2026, the maximum stay for eligible ABTC holders in China has increased from 60 days to 90 days per visit.

=== Hong Kong ===
All Hong Kong permanent residents who are bona fide frequent business travellers are eligible to apply for the card through the Immigration Department by submitting form ID900, regardless of whether they are Chinese citizens, provided they have never been convicted of a criminal offence or been refused entry to another APEC participating economy. The application fee is HK$540.

As Hong Kong is a full participant in the scheme, non-Hong Kong residents who hold an APEC Business Travel Card may enter Hong Kong visa-free for 90 days and are entitled to use dedicated fast-track or resident counters.

=== Japan ===
Japan has been a full participant since 2003, and the Ministry of Foreign Affairs (MOFA) issues the card to Japanese citizens who are business travellers. However, since a Japanese passport already affords a number of visa-free travel privileges, use of the card may not always extend the permitted length of stay (for example, when travelling to Chile, South Korea or Taiwan), and in some cases it may even reduce it (such as when travelling to Peru).

=== New Zealand ===
New Zealand citizens who travel frequently on business and are of good character may apply for an ABTC through Immigration New Zealand, at a cost of NZ$150.

As New Zealand is a full participant in the scheme, foreign cardholders may enter the country visa-free for up to 90 days.

=== Russia ===
Cardholders are permitted to remain for business purposes for a maximum of 90 days in any 180-day period. Travellers holding a virtual ABTC must obtain a special permit granting a multiple-entry visa to enter the Russian Federation. Those holding a physical ABTC are exempt from this requirement.

=== United States ===
Although the United States is not a full participant in the scheme, cardholders may use dedicated fast-track lanes for aircrew at international airports, but remain subject to the standard entry and visa requirements.

Applicants for ABTCs must already be enrolled in Global Entry, NEXUS, or SENTRI. As the United States is only a transitional member of the ABTC scheme and does not extend any visa waiver to ABTC holders from other economies, U.S. citizens do not, reciprocally, enjoy any additional visa-free travel through the scheme. They do, however, qualify for expedited visa appointment procedures for those economies that require visas for U.S. citizens, and may use diplomatic or crew lanes at airports. Among the 21 ABTC scheme member economies, the visa policies of China, Russia, and Vietnam require advance visas for U.S. citizens making short-term business visits, while Papua New Guinea issues visas on arrival for a fee. As of 21 November 2025, the fee to apply for ABTCs was $70.

The Asia-Pacific Economic Cooperation Business Travel Cards Act (Pub. L. 112–54 (text) (PDF)) was passed in November 2011 to authorise the issuance of ABTCs to U.S. travellers until September 2018. Implementation commenced shortly thereafter. In May 2014, the United States Department of Homeland Security published an interim final rule on the issuance of ABTCs to U.S. citizens. In June 2014, U.S. Customs and Border Protection began accepting ABTC applications through the GOES portal, the same website used for its other trusted traveller schemes. On 2 November 2017, prior to the September 2018 expiration of the temporary programme, the Asia-Pacific Economic Cooperation Business Travel Cards Act of 2017 (S. 504) was signed, making the APEC Business Travel Card a permanent programme.
