= Ola Olstad =

Norwegian zoologist and polar explorer

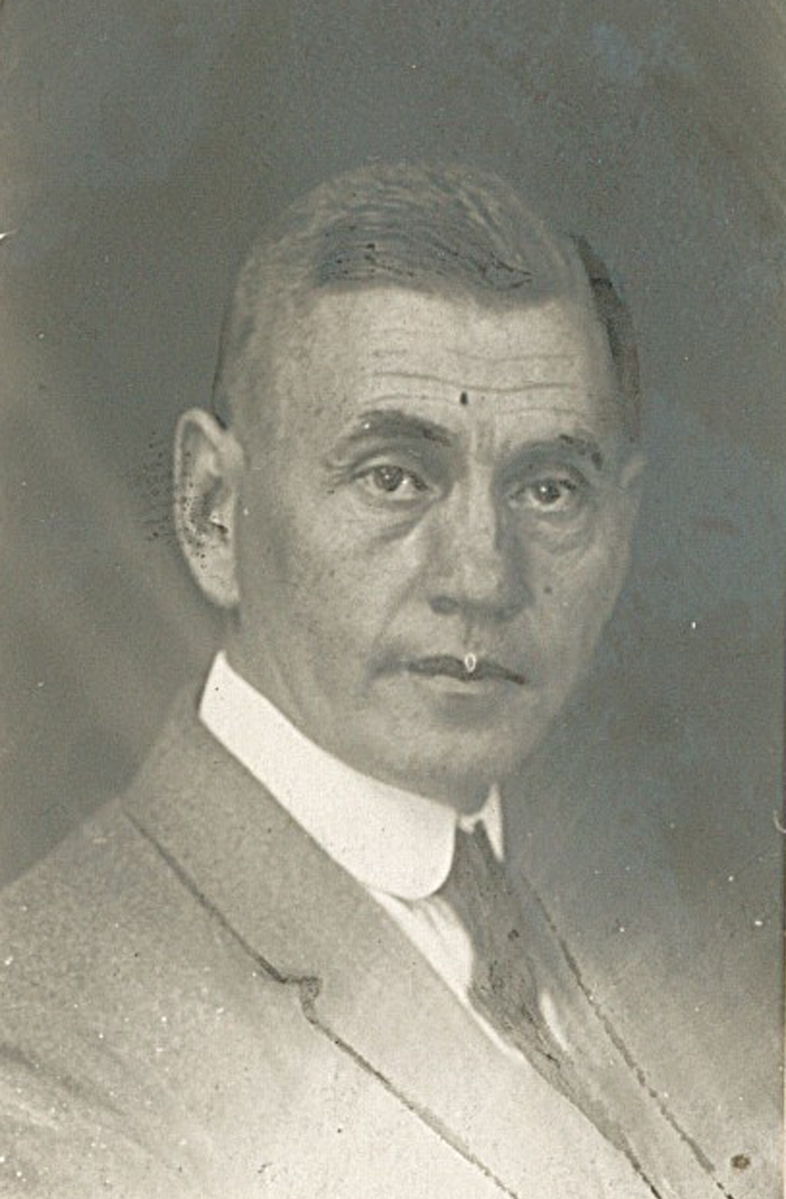
- Portrait photograph of Olstad in the 1930s

Ola Olstad (22 February 1885 – 15 November 1969) was a Norwegian zoologist and polar explorer.

Olstad Glacier on Peter I island is named after him.

== Exploration ==
Oldstad joined the Norvegia I expedition to Antarctica from 1927 to 1928.

Olstad led the Norvegia II expedition to Antarctica from 1928 to 1929. It was on this expedition that Peter I island was claimed for Norway on 2 February 1929.
