= Visa requirements for Canadian citizens =

Entry restrictions by the authorities of other states placed on citizens of the Canada

Visa requirements for Canadian citizens are administrative entry restrictions by the authorities of other countries that are imposed on citizens of Canada.

As of 2026, Canadian citizens have visa-free or visa on arrival access to 183 countries and territories, resulting in the Canadian passport being ranked 6th in the world according to the Henley Passport Index. It is ranked 7th by the Global Passport Power Rank.

== Visa requirements map ==
Visa requirements for Canadian citizens holding ordinary passports Canada Visa not required or Electronic Travel Authorisation Visa available both on arrival or online Visa on arrival eVisa Visa required prior to arrival or not established

== Visa Requirements ==
The following table indicates the entry requirements and duration of stay for a given country, along with any notes that may be relevant for that given country.

Country	Entry requirement	Stay duration	Notes (excluding departure fees)	Reciprocity
Afghanistan	eVisa	30 days	e-Visa : Visitors must arrive at Kabul International (KBL).; The Canadian government advises its citizens not to visit Afghanistan due to hostile and unpredictable security situation, likely terrorist attacks, ongoing armed conflict, the risk of kidnapping, arbitrary arrest and detention, high crime rate, and widespread violations of human rights by the de facto authorities.; Canadians do not need a visa if they were born in Afghanistan or their parent is a national of Afghanistan or was born in Afghanistan.; All visitors are fingerprinted, and are required to register with the Ministry of Foreign Affairs upon arrival.	No
Albania	Visa not required	90 days		No
Algeria	Visa required		Visa Issuance: Passengers with a boarding authorization issued by the Ministry of Tourism traveling as tourists can obtain a visa on arrival for a maximum of 30 days. They must have: a return/onward ticket and a hotel reservation confirmation.; The visa is issued upon arrival only at Algiers International Airport or at Djanet Airport.; Processing time for a tourist visa to Algeria is around 48 hours.	Yes
Andorra	Visa not required	90 days		Yes
Angola	Visa not required	30 days		No
Antigua and Barbuda	Visa not required	180 days	The digital arrival form can be completed within 72 hours prior to arrival on a mobile phone or tablet, Although the digital arrival form is encouraged, the paper form is still accepted.	No
Argentina	Visa not required	90 days	Visitors are fingerprinted (Right thumb fingerprint) and photographed upon entry.	No
Armenia	eVisa / Visa on arrival	120 days	May obtain a visa on arrival for a maximum stay of 120 days at a cost of 15,000 AMD.; May also obtain an e-Visa in advance: Visitor visa (up to 21 days of stay) / Non-refundable fee - 8 USD.; Visitor visa (up to 120 days of stay) / Non-refundable fee - 38 USD.; e-Visa processing time is up to 3 working days.; Canadians with a residence permit valid for at least six months from the date of entry into Armenia issued by one of the GCC states, US, EU Member States and Schengen Area States may get a visa free entry up to 180 days within a one-year period starting from July1st ,2026 till July1st, 2027.	No
Australia and territories	Electronic Travel Authorisation	90 days	90 days on each visit in 12-month period.; Canadian Passport Holders may enter using Smartgate system.	Yes
Austria	Visa not required	90 days	90 days within any 180-day period in the Schengen Area.	Yes
Azerbaijan	eVisa	30 days	Canadians with a residence permit issued by one of the GCC states may obtain a 30-day tourist visa on arrival in Azerbaijan. They must present their valid visa or residence permit along with their passport.	No
Bahamas	Visa not required	8 months	visitors who have items to declare must complete the "C17 Form Accompanied Baggage" before departure.	Yes
Bahrain	eVisa / Visa on arrival	30 days	Nationals of Canada can obtain a visa on arrival for a maximum stay of 1 month. They can apply to extend their stay for an additional 2 weeks.	No
Bangladesh	Visa on arrival	30 days	Visa on arrival is available at Dhaka, Chittagong, and Sylhet international airports, pre arrival visa required if arriving by sea or by land border crossing.; No visa required for Bangladeshi Canadians and their spouse and children with a copy of a former Bangladeshi passport, a Dual Nationality Certificate, NVR, a Bangladeshi NID, or a digital birth registration certificate.	No
Barbados	Visa not required	6 months	Complete an "Immigration/Customs Form" before departure.	Yes
Belarus	Visa not required / eVisa	30 days	30 day visa free access available to travelers that arrive and depart via Brest (BQT), Gomel (GME), Grodno (GNA), Minsk (MSQ) Minsk International Airport, Mogilev (MVQ) or Vitebsk (VTB) and are not arriving from or planning to depart to a Russian Federation airport. Otherwise a visa is required. Visas can be issued on arrival at the Minsk International Airport if the supporting documents are submitted at least 3 business days before arrival.; The Canadian government advises its citizens not to visit Belarus due to the risk of arbitrary enforcement of local laws and the armed conflict between Russia and Ukraine.; e-Visa can be issued for 30 days and can be used at all international checkpoints, including road and rail.	No
Belgium	Visa not required	90 days	90 days within any 180-day period in the Schengen Area.	Yes
Belize	Visa not required	30 days	All travelers must complete an arrival form and customs declaration	No
Benin	eVisa	30 days	Must have an international vaccination certificate.; Three types of electronic visa are offered: the e-Visa valid for 30 days for a single entry (50 EUR), the e-Visa valid for 30 days for several (multiple) entries (75 EUR), and the e-Visa valid for 90 days to make several (multiple) entries (100 EUR).; Free 72-hour visa for cruise passengers.	No
Bhutan	eVisa	90 days	May independently obtain an e-Visa for 90 days stay. Visa fee is 40 USD per person (nonrefundable). Visa application maybe processed within 5 business days.; The Sustainable Development Fee (SDF) of 200 USD per person, per night for almost all visitors to Bhutan. Additionally, if payment is made in US dollars from September 1, 2023 to August 31, 2027, the SDF is 100 USD.	Yes
Bolivia	Visa not required	90 days		No
Bosnia and Herzegovina	Visa not required	90 days	90 days within any 6-month period.	No
Botswana	Visa not required	90 days	90 days within any 1-year period.	No
Brazil	eVisa	90 days	Visa requirements reinstated for Nationals of Canada, and Canadian citizens are able to obtain visas online.	No
Brunei	Visa not required	90 days	Must obtain an e-arrival card before departure or upon arrival.	Yes
Bulgaria	Visa not required	90 days	90 days within any 180-day period in the Schengen Area.	Yes
Burkina Faso	eVisa		The Canadian government advises its citizens not to visit Burkina Faso due to the volatile security situation and the high threat of kidnapping, terrorism and armed banditry and the instability of the political situation.	No
Burundi	Online Visa / Visa on arrival	1 month	From December 2021, passengers of all countries that previously required a visa can now obtain visas on arrival at Bujumbura International Airport and all land borders.	Yes
Cambodia	eVisa / Visa on arrival	30 days	Cambodia introduced the v-Pass (Visitor Pass) on July 1, 2025.	No
Cameroon	eVisa		Tax for a visa on internal flights has to be obtained upon arrival.; Holders of a pre-arranged approval issued by "Le Delegue General de la Surete" can obtain a visa on arrival.	Yes
Cape Verde	Visa not required	30 days	Must register online at least five days prior to arrival.	No
Central African Republic	Visa required		The Canadian government advises its citizens not to visit the Central African Republic due to the unstable security situation activities of armed rebel groups and the high level of violent crime.; A letter of invitation to the Central African Republic must be applied 2 weeks in advance before the planned date of travel.	Yes
Chad	eVisa	90 days	Canadians are now able to apply for an e-Visa to visit Chad as it was introduced recently; Multiple-entry e-Visa valid for 90 days is 100 EUR.	Yes
Chile	Visa not required	90 days		Yes
China	Visa not required	30 days	From 17 February 2026 to 31 December 2026, visas are not required for 30 days for business, tourism, family/friends visit, exchange and transit purposes.; 240-hour (10-day) visa-free transit to a third country or region (including Hong Kong, Macau or Taiwan) using any mode of transport. Must have a confirmed onward ticket/itinerary, and enter through 1 of 64 approved ports.; During which, may freely travel within the 24 provinces permitted for visa-free transit and engage in tourism, business, and visits.; 24-hour visa-free transit to a third country or region (including Hong Kong, Macau, and Taiwan), is available at most international airports, without leaving the airport.; Travellers who need to leave the airport may obtain a temporary entry permit from immigration.; 5-day port visa (Visa on Arrival) for Shenzhen if arriving at designated ports of entry from Hong Kong by land or sea, for stays within Shenzhen.; 3-day port visa (Visa on Arrival) if arriving in Zhuhai or Xiamen at designated ports of entry, for stays within the respective city.; 15-day visa-free entry for cruise ship passengers in tour groups, if arriving at any cruise port along China's coastline, including but not limited to Tianjin; Dalian; Shanghai; Lianyungang; Wenzhou; Zhoushan; Xiamen; Qingdao; Guangzhou; Shenzhen; Beihai; Haikou; Sanya. May further travel inland to all regions of coastal provinces (and equivalents) and Beijing.; May apply for a port visa (Visa on Arrival) if travelling for an urgent, qualified reason. Prior clearance for port visa is highly recommended or may be denied boarding by airlines.; Visa not required for 30 days visiting Hainan Island, if arriving directly on the island from outside Mainland China.; Visas for Canadian citizens are valid for up to 9 years and 11 months.	No
Colombia	Visa not required	90 days	Extendable up to 180-days stay within a 1-year period.; 256,000 Colombian Pesos (equivalent to CAD$85) must be paid upon arrival. Passengers older than 79 years or younger than 14 years are exempt.	No
Comoros	Visa on arrival	45 days	Visa on arrival cost is 30 EUR or 50 USD.	No
Republic of the Congo	Online Visa required		Visas and invitation letters are only approved via tour operators except passengers with a VIP invitation.; Travelers must obtain a visa from the Republic of the Congo embassy. However, they can also apply for the visa online at the website of at the Republic of the Congo embassy in France.	Yes
Democratic Republic of the Congo	eVisa	7 days	Visa on arrival will be issued at Ndjili International Airport if a letter of invitation (Visa volant) given by the Ministry of Interior and Security.; The Canadian government advises its citizens not to travel to Democratic Republic of the Congo (DRC) due to the unstable security situation, ongoing armed conflict, terrorism and violent crime.; Canadians with a prove of being of Democratic Republic of the Congo (DRC) origins or their parents of Democratic Republic of the Congo (DRC) origins can obtain a visa upon arrival for a maximum of 30 days.	Yes
Costa Rica	Visa not required	180 days		No
Côte d'Ivoire	eVisa	3 months	e-Visa holders must arrive via Port Bouet Airport.	No
Croatia	Visa not required	90 days	90 days within any 180-day period in the Schengen Area.	Yes
Cuba	eVisa	90 days	e-Visas are included on the ticket price for passengers on direct flights from Canada.; Must complete the "D'Viajeros" form within 7 days before departure.	Yes
Cyprus	Visa not required	90 days	90 days within any 180-day period in the Schengen Area.	Yes
Czech Republic	Visa not required	90 days	90 days within any 180-day period in the Schengen Area.	Yes
Denmark and territories	Visa not required	90 days	90 days within any 180-day period regardless of previous time spent in other Schengen countries (except the other Nordic countries).	Yes
Djibouti	eVisa	90 days		No
Dominica	Visa not required	6 months	Visitors must complete a landing card 3 days before departure.	No
Dominican Republic	Visa not required	30 days		No
Ecuador	Visa not required	90 days		No
Egypt	eVisa / Visa on arrival	30 days	On-arrival visa costs 36 USD for Single entry visa (Tourism).; According to Timatic, citizens of Canada may enter Egypt without a visa at Sharm el-Sheikh, Saint Catherine or Taba airports, for a maximum stay of 15 days.	No
El Salvador	Visa not required	180 days	Part of the Central America-4 Free Mobility Agreement. One ninety-day extension may be granted if applied five days before the first expires.; In the CA4 area, you get 90 days total for the entire area. To reset your stay, you must leave the area.	No
Equatorial Guinea	eVisa		e-Visa holders must arrive via Malabo International Airport. The processing fee is 75 USD.	Yes
Eritrea	Visa required		A tourist visa for Canadian citizens is issued for a stay of 1 month from arrival to Eritrea.; Visa on arrival can be obtained only at Asmara International Airport upon previous authorization from the Government.	Yes
Estonia	Visa not required	90 days	90 days within any 180-day period in the Schengen Area.	Yes
Eswatini	Visa not required	30 days		No
Ethiopia	eVisa / Visa on arrival	90 days	Visa on arrival is obtainable only at Addis Ababa Bole International Airport.; e-Visa holders must arrive via Addis Ababa Bole International Airport.; e-Visa is available for 30 or 90 days.	No
Fiji	Visa not required	4 months		No
Finland	Visa not required	90 days	90 days within any 180-day period in the Schengen Area.	Yes
France and territories	Visa not required	90 days	90 days within any 180-day period in the Schengen Area (in the Regions of France).; A Canadian passport is not required for visa-free travel to the French overseas territory of Saint Pierre et Miquelon; an identification document (e.g. driver's licence or Secure Certificate of Indian Status) can be used instead.	Yes
Gabon	eVisa	90 days	e-Visa holders must arrive via Libreville International Airport.	No
Gambia	Visa not required	30 days	Visitors can apply for an additional 30 days extension, but must apply for a residence permit by the 56th day of stay.	No
Georgia	Visa not required	1 year		No
Germany	Visa not required	90 days	90 days within any 180-day period in the Schengen Area.	Yes
Ghana	eVisa		May apply online.; Visitors staying longer than 60 days are required to extend their visas at the Ghana Immigration Service (GIS).; Visa applications to be processed within 5 working days.	Yes
Greece	Visa not required	90 days	90 days within any 180-day period in the Schengen Area.	Yes
Grenada	Visa not required	3 months	Passengers must present an Embarkation/Disembarkation (ED) Form upon arrival. The form can be completed at most 72 hours before departure or upon arrival.	No
Guatemala	Visa not required	90 days	Part of the Central America-4 Free Mobility Agreement.; In the CA4 area, you get 90 days total for the entire area. To reset your stay, you must leave the area.	No
Guinea	eVisa	90 days	Citizens of Canada who obtain an e-Visa can stay in Guinea for up to 5 years.	No
Guinea-Bissau	Visa on arrival	90 days		No
Guyana	Visa not required	90 days	An online Immigration and Customs declaration form before arrival.	No
Haiti	Visa not required	3 months	The Canadian government advises its citizens not to visit Haiti due to high level of kidnapping, violent crime and civil unrest.	No
Honduras	Visa not required	3 months	Part of the Central America-4 Free Mobility Agreement.; In the CA4 area, you get 90 days total for the entire area. To reset your stay, you must leave the area.	No
Hungary	Visa not required	90 days	90 days within any 180-day period regardless of previous time spent in other Schengen countries.	Yes
Iceland	Visa not required	90 days	90 days within any 180-day period in the Schengen Area.	Yes
India	eVisa	30 days	Canadians who are or have been Pakistani nationals or have had ancestors who are or have been Pakistani nationals are required to follow a stringent and longer procedure.; Canadians who have a defence/military/security/police background(serving/retired) or hold an official/diplomatic passport, are not eligible for e-Visa and must apply for a visa at the embassy.	No
Indonesia	e-VOA / Visa on arrival	30 days	Visa on arrival (IDR 500,000) renewable a maximum of once for 30 days.; All travelers to Indonesia must apply for an Arrival Card online before visiting the archipelago.	No
Iran	Visa required		Canadian citizens who want to travel to Iran, need to do so with a fully organized tour. Applying for an Iranian visa without booking a complete tour from a local travel agency will result in getting rejected by the Iranian Ministry of Foreign Affairs (MFA).; Tourists for Kish and Qeshm Islands do not require a visa for a total of 14 days.; The Canadian government advises its citizens not to visit Iran due to violent civil unrest volatile security situation, the regional threat of terrorism and the possibility of arbitrary detention	Yes
Iraq	eVisa	30 days	Canadians may obtain an e-Visa or visa on arrival for up to 30 days to Kurdistan Region.; The Canadian government advises its citizens not to visit Iraq (including Kurdistan region) due to the volatile and unpredictable security situation the ongoing thread of terrorism, violent extremism and organized crime.	No
Ireland	Visa not required	90 days		Yes
Israel	Electronic Travel Authorization	90 days	The Canadian government advises its citizens not to visit Israel due to a hostile and unpredictable security situation.; Entry refused to anyone who "knowingly issues a public call for boycotting Israel."	Yes
Italy	Visa not required	90 days	90 days within any 180-day period in the Schengen Area.	Yes
Jamaica	Visa not required	90 days	90 days (business), 6 months (tourist).; Must submit the customs and immigration C5 form before departure or upon arrival.	No
Japan	Visa not required	90 days		Yes
Jordan	eVisa / Visa on arrival	30 days	Visa can be obtained upon arrival, it will cost a total of 40 JOD, obtainable at most international ports of entry and land border crossings. (except King Hussein/Allenby Bridge)	No
Kazakhstan	Visa not required	30 days		No
Kenya	Electronic Travel Authorisation	90 days	Applications can be submitted up to 90 days prior to travel and must be submitted at least 3 days in advance.; eTA fee is 32.50 USD.; Proof of reservation at the hotel where visitors plan to stay is required (if staying with friends, an invitation letter is also acceptable).; Yellow fever vaccination certificate is required if coming from endemic countries.; Can also be entered on an East Africa tourist visa issued by Rwanda or Uganda.	No
Kiribati	Visa not required	90 days	May not exceed 90 days within any given 12 months period.	No
North Korea	Visa required		The Canadian government advises its citizens not to visit North Korea due to the possibility of arbitrary detention, and uncertain security situation caused by its nuclear weapons development program and highly repressive regime.; Visitors traveling for tourist purposes have to hold an authorization to travel, issued by a travel company in North Korea (Dem. People's Rep.).; Independent travelers must be escorted by a tour guide at all times.	Yes
South Korea	Electronic Travel Authorization	6 months	South Korea extends K-ETA exemption for Canadians until December 31, 2026.; Canadian Travelers must be in possession of a Korea Electronic Travel Authorization (K-ETA) to enter Korea visa-free, which can be completed up to 24 hours before boarding a flight, The validity period of a K-ETA is 3 years from the date of approval.	Yes
Kuwait	eVisa / Visa on arrival	3 months		No
Kyrgyzstan	Visa not required	30 days	A single or multiple tourist or business e-Visa for 90 days is also available	No
Laos	eVisa / Visa on arrival	30 days	18 (Note: Savannakhet Airport; Lanetoui - Mengkang (China); Meuangmom - Wan Pong (Myanmar); Banvang - Ban Khok Phai (Thailand); Namngeun - Huay Kon (Thailand); Paksan - Bueng Kan (Thailand); Paktaphan - Pak Saeng (Thailand); Pangmon - Ban Huak (Thailand); Phoudou (Thailand); Dak ta ock - Nam Giang (Vietnam); La Lai (Vietnam); Namkan (Vietnam); Namphao - Cau Treo (Vietnam); Namsoy - Na Meo (Vietnam); Naphao - Cha Lo (Vietnam); Pahang - Long Sap (Vietnam); Panghok - Tây Trang (Vietnam); Phoukeua - Bo Y (Vietnam)) of the 33 border crossings are only open to regular visa holders.; e-Visa may be used to enter Laos through the Luang Prabang, Pakse and Vientiane international airports, 3 Thai-Lao Friendship Bridges (Note: Vientiane (Friendship Bridge 1); Savannakhet (Friendship Bridge 2); Bokeo (Friendship Bridge 4)), in Boten (road and railroad), and in Vientiane (at Khamsavath railway station).; Visa on arrival is available at the Luang Prabang, Pakse and Vientiane international airports, 4 Thai-Lao Friendship Bridges (Note: Vientiane (Friendship Bridge 1); Savannakhet (Friendship Bridge 2); Khammouane (Friendship Bridge 3); Bokeo (Friendship Bridge 4)) and 7 border crossings. (Note: Nongnokkheane - Trapeang Kriel (Cambodia); Boten - Bo han (China); Golden Triangle/Samliemkham (Thailand); Khamsavath railway station (Thailand); Namheuang - Ban Na Kraseng (Thailand); Vang tao - Chongmek (Thailand); Dansavan - Lao Bảo (Vietnam))	No
Latvia	Visa not required	90 days	90 days within any 180-day period in the Schengen Area.	Yes
Lebanon	Free visa on arrival	1 Month	The Canadian government advises its citizens not to visit Lebanon due to ongoing military activity.; Extendable for 2 additional months; granted free of charge at Beirut International Airport or any other port of entry if there is no Israeli visa or seal, holding a telephone number, an address in Lebanon, and a non-refundable return or circle trip ticket.	No
Lesotho	Visa not required	30 days		No
Liberia	e-VOA	3 months	Travelers can pre-apply for the visa online through a dedicated portal allows them to obtain a Visa upon arrival in Liberia if there is no embassy in their home country. But if there is a Liberian embassy in your country, you are required to apply for your visa directly at the embassy and not through this portal.; Currently available only upon arrival at Roberts International Airport (ROB) in Monrovia.	Yes
Libya	eVisa	30 days	Tourist e-Visa is valid for 90 days and good for single entry, it allows applicants from most countries to stay no more than 30 days by paying a 63 USD fee.; The Canadian government advises its citizens not to travel to Libya due to ongoing conflict and the threat of terrorism and kidnapping. Canadians currently in Libya are strongly advised to depart immediately.	Yes
Liechtenstein	Visa not required	90 days	90 days within any 180-day period in the Schengen Area.	Yes
Lithuania	Visa not required	90 days	90 days within any 180-day period in the Schengen Area.	Yes
Luxembourg	Visa not required	90 days	90 days within any 180-day period in the Schengen Area.	Yes
Madagascar	eVisa / Visa on arrival	90 days	For durations of less than 15 days, the visa fee is free, but an administrative fee of 30 EUR (35 USD) has to be paid.; 30 days - 35 EUR / 41 USD; 60 days - 40 EUR / 47 USD; 90 days - 50 EUR / 59 USD	No
Malawi	eVisa / Visa on arrival	30 days		No
Malaysia	Visa not required	3 months	The electronic Malaysia Digital Arrival Card must be submitted within three days before the date of arrival in Malaysia.	No
Maldives	Free visa on arrival	30 days	Extendable stay.	No
Mali	Visa required		The Canadian government advises its citizens not to visit Mali due to the threat of terrorism, kidnapping, banditry and unpredictable security situation.; An average processing time for a tourist visa to Mali is around 3-15 working days.	Yes
Malta	Visa not required	90 days	90 days within any 180-day period in the Schengen Area.	Yes
Marshall Islands	Visa on arrival	90 days		No
Mauritania	eVisa	30 days	As of Jan 5th 2025 will be able to apply for an e-Visa.; e-Visa available for 30, 90, 360 or 720 days duration.; After getting the visa approval a QR code has to be printed, presented to the security personnel and fees must be paid upon arrival in Mauritania cost of USD 60 for a 30 days e-visa.	No
Mauritius	Visa not required	90 days	180 days per calendar year for tourism, 120 days per calendar for business	No
Mexico	Visa not required	180 days	Actual permitted duration of stay is decided on arrival by border agents, and is often shorter than 180 days	No
Micronesia	Visa not required	30 days		No
Moldova	Visa not required	90 days	90 days within any 180-day period.	No
Monaco	Visa not required	90 days	90 days within any 180-day period.; Monaco does not have a visa policy of its own and the Schengen visa policy applies.	Yes
Mongolia	Visa not required	30 days		No
Montenegro	Visa not required	90 days	90 days within any 180-day period.	No
Morocco	Visa not required	3 months		No
Mozambique	Electronic Travel Authorization	30 days	Visitors must register their ETA on the e-Visa platform at least 48 hours before travel and pay a processing fee of 48 USD.	No
Myanmar	eVisa	28 days	e-Visa holders must arrive via Yangon, Nay Pyi Taw or Mandalay airports or via land border crossings with Thailand — Tachileik, Myawaddy and Kawthaung or India — Rih Khaw Dar and Tamu.; e-Visa available for both tourism (allowed stay is 28 days) or business (allowed stay is 70 days) purposes.; The Canadian government advises its citizens not to visit Myanmar due to ongoing civil unrest and armed conflict.	No
Namibia	eVisa / Visa on arrival	90 days	Can obtain a visa upon arrival at Hosea Kutako International Airport, Walvis Bay International Airport and main land border crossings.	No
Nauru	Visa required		Criminal record and medical fitness certificates are not required for Canadian citizens.; Visa Issuance: Passengers with an entry permit letter (visa letter) issued by Nauru. Applications can be submitted via email before departure	Yes
Nepal	Online Visa / Visa on arrival	90 days	May obtain a visa on arrival which is good for multiple entries and allows visitor to stay for no more than 15, 30 or 90 days.; May obtain a visa through kiosks at the airport.	No
Netherlands	Visa not required	90 days	90 days within any 180-day period in the Schengen Area.	Yes
New Zealand	Electronic Travel Authority	3 months	May enter using eGate.; International Visitor Conservation and Tourism Levy must be paid upon requesting an Electronic Travel Authority.; Holders of an Australian Permanent Resident Visa or Resident Return Visa may be granted a New Zealand Resident Visa on arrival permitting indefinite stay (pursuant to the Trans-Tasman Travel Arrangement), subject to meeting character requirements and obtaining an Electronic Travel Authority prior to departure. Such travelers are not required to pay the International Visitor Conservation and Tourism Levy.	Yes
Nicaragua	Visa not required	90 days	All visitors must pay 10 USD in cash for a tourist entry stamp upon arrival (exact change is recommended.). The stamp is valid for up to 90 days.; Part of the Central America-4 Free Mobility Agreement.; In the CA4 area, you get 90 days total for the entire area. To reset your stay, you must leave the area.	No
Niger	Visa required		The Canadian government advises its citizens not to visit Niger due to political instability and the risk of terrorism and kidnapping.; Visa on arrival at Diori Hamani International Airport if a letter of invitation ('Visa Volant') issued by the Ministry of Interior is honored.	Yes
Nigeria	eVisa	30 days	All you need to know about Nigeria Immigration Services.; Holders of written e-Visa approval issued by the Immigration Authority can obtain a visa on arrival for Business, provided they hold a visa application form and e-Visa application payment receipt and have an invitation letter from a Nigerian company accepting immigration responsibilities.; Visa not required for Nigerian-born citizens.	Yes
North Macedonia	Visa not required	90 days		No
Norway	Visa not required	3 months	3 months within any 6-month period, regardless of previous time spent in other Schengen countries, but including time spent in other Nordic countries.	Yes
Oman	Visa not required / eVisa	14 days / 30 days	Visa exemption valid for 14 days, evisa for 30 days; Holders of a visa or entrance stamp of the Emirate of Dubai that is valid for at least 21 days are visa exempt.; Holders of a visa for Qatar that is valid for travel to Oman and valid for at least one month are visa exempt when arriving directly from Qatar.	No
Pakistan	eVisa	3 months		No
Palau	Free visa on arrival	30 days	Extendable stay by twice only with a fee.; Passengers must submit the Palau Entry Form at most 72 hours before departure.	No
Panama	Visa not required	180 days		No
Papua New Guinea	eVisa / Visa on arrival	60 days	Visa on arrival is only available at Port Moresby Airport.; Available at Gurney Airport (Alotau), Mount Hagen Airport, Port Moresby Airport and Tokua Airport (Rabaul).	Yes
Paraguay	Visa not required	90 days		No
Peru	Visa not required	90 days		No
Philippines	Visa not required	30 days	For longer periods, a visa extension is available once inside the country from the Bureau of immigration.; Arriving foreign passengers should register at The eTravel System.	No
Poland	Visa not required	90 days	90 days within any 180-day period in the Schengen Area.	Yes
Portugal	Visa not required	90 days	90 days within any 180-day period in the Schengen Area.	Yes
Qatar	Visa not required	30 days		Yes
Romania	Visa not required	90 days	90 days within any 180-day period in the Schengen Area.	Yes
Russia	Visa required		Cruise ship passengers cruising in and out of a Russian port within 72 hours, who spend each night on board, and who only leave the ship on tours organized by the cruise company, do not require a tourist visa.; The Canadian government advises its citizens not to visit Russia due to the Russian invasion of Ukraine.; Process of tourist visas for stays with a period of 30 days is required.; Canadians with a valid visa issued by Belarus can enter the Russian Fed visa free and the Belarusian visa must be valid for the period of intended stay in The Russian Fed.; May apply online and then submit all the documents at the embassy to get the visa	Yes
Rwanda	Visa not required	30 days	Can also be entered on an East Africa tourist visa issued by Kenya or Uganda.	No
Saint Kitts and Nevis	Electronic Travel Authorisation	6 months		No
Saint Lucia	Visa not required	6 weeks	Must present an Immigration Form upon arrival can be completed before departure or upon arrival	No
Saint Vincent and the Grenadines	Visa not required	30 days	Can be extended up to 1 year, permitting the discretion of local immigration authorities.	No
Samoa	Entry permit on arrival	90 days		Yes
San Marino	Visa not required	90 days		Yes
São Tomé and Príncipe	Visa not required	15 days		No
Saudi Arabia	eVisa / Visa on arrival	90 days	Non-Muslim residents might be prohibited from visiting Mecca and its holy sites. Other religious places may also be restricted to Non-Muslim people.	No
Senegal	Visa not required	90 days		No
Serbia	Visa not required	90 days		No
Seychelles	Electronic Border System	3 months	Application can be submitted up to 30 days before travel.; Visitors must upload a reservation confirmation(s) for each visitor's location of stay in Seychelles.; Yellow fever vaccination certificate is required if coming from endemic countries.; Payment of the fee (EUR 10) by credit or debit card.; Valid for one journey only and it expires once exit the country.	No
Sierra Leone	eVisa / Visa on arrival	3 months / 30 days		No
Singapore	Visa not required	30 days	Submitting the SG Arrival Card (SGAC) before arrival is must via the mobile application or the website.	Yes
Slovakia	Visa not required	90 days	90 days within any 180-day period in the Schengen Area.	Yes
Slovenia	Visa not required	90 days	90 days within any 180-day period in the Schengen Area.	Yes
Solomon Islands	Free Visitor's permit on arrival	3 months	3 months with any 1-year period.	Yes
Somalia	eVisa	30 days	The Canadian government advises its citizens not to visit Somalia including Somaliland due to significant threat from terrorism, kidnapping, armed conflict and a high level of violent crime, extremely volatile security situation and high threat of domestic terrorism.	No
South Africa	Visa not required	90 days	South Africa's ETA portal is now accessible, but not yet functional.	No
South Sudan	eVisa		Obtainable online 30 days single entry for 100 USD, 90 days multiple entry for 200 USD and 180 days multiple entry for 350 USD.; Printed visa authorization must be presented at the time of travel.; The Canadian government advises its citizens not to visit South Sudan due to ongoing armed conflict, inter-ethnic violence and high levels of violent crime.	No
Spain	Visa not required	90 days	90 days within any 180-day period in the Schengen Area.	Yes
Sri Lanka	Electronic Travel Authorization / Visa on arrival	30 days	Electronic Travel Authorization subject to granting/issuing.; With effect from 05.25.2026, Canadian nationals are eligible to obtain tourist visa (ETA) free-of-charge for a period of 30 days.	No
Sudan	Visa required		The Canadian government advises its citizens not to visit Sudan due to armed conflict, civil unrest, terrorism and kidnapping, the volatile security situation.; Khartoum International Airport is closed and options for leaving Sudan are extremely limited. There may be ongoing disruptions to critical infrastructure and essential services.; Visa on arrival if holding letter of invitation registered in Sudan with a pre-approval from the Ministry of Foreign Affairs (Sudan).; Can obtain a visa upon arrival if married to a national of Sudan or prove that are of Sudanese origins from the father's side.	Yes
Suriname	Visa not required	90 days	An entrance fee of USD 50 or EUR 50 must be paid online prior to arrival.; Multiple entry e-Visa is also available.	No
Sweden	Visa not required	90 days	90 days within any 180-day period in the Schengen Area.	Yes
Switzerland	Visa not required	90 days	90 days within any 180-day period in the Schengen Area.	Yes
Syria	Visa required		The Canadian government advises its citizens not to visit Syria due to the ongoing armed conflict, terrorism, criminality, arbitrary detention, torture and forced disappearance.; Canadians that were born in Algeria, Jordan, Lebanon, Mauritania, Morocco, Somalia, Sudan, Syria, Tunisia, Yemen or GCC member state do not need a visa.; Canadians of Syrian origin don't need a visa, they must have a proof.; Canadians with a residence permit issued by GCC member state or Lebanon, can obtain a visa upon arrival. They must have a valid address in Syria, a contact number and sufficient funds to cover their stay.; Nationals of countries without any Syrian representation can obtain a visa on arrival.; Syria Visa Fees is 100 USD for Tourism duration of 1 month single entry.	Yes
Taiwan	Visa not required	90 days	Taiwan Arrival Card	Yes
Tajikistan	Visa not required / eVisa	30 days / 60 days	e-Visa also available.; e-Visa holders can enter through all border points.; Visiting GBAO requires a permit that can be requested alongside the eVisa.	No
Tanzania	eVisa / Visa on arrival	90 days		No
Thailand	Visa not required	30 days	Maximum 2 visits annually if not arriving by air.	No
Timor-Leste	Visa on arrival	30 days	VOA is obtainable at Presidente Nicolau Lobato International Airport and at Dili Sea Port.; Fees are for Transit 20 USD, Tourist 30 USD and Business 50 USD.	No
Togo	eVisa	15 days		No
Tonga	Free visa on arrival	30 days	Extendable up to 6 months.	No
Trinidad and Tobago	Visa not required	90 days	Passengers must submit the online Arrival/Departure Card at most 72 hours before arrival	No
Tunisia	Visa not required	4 months		No
Turkey	Visa not required	90 days	90 days within any 180-day period.	No
Turkmenistan	eVisa		10-day visa on arrival if holding a letter of invitation provided by a company registered in Turkmenistan with a prior approval from the Foreign Ministry. Visitors can apply to extend their stay for an additional 10 days.; When transiting between two non-bordering countries, visitors can obtain a Turkmenistan transit visa for a five-day stay. This must be applied for in advance at the Turkmenistan Embassy. Visitors must also submit copies of the visas for the country of entry into Turkmenistan and the country of departure from Turkmenistan. Visa fee is 20 USD.; Canadian citizens have the right to visa-free transit through the international transit area of Ashgabat International Airport.	Yes
Tuvalu	Visa on arrival	1 month		No
Uganda	eVisa	3 months	Visa fee is 50 USD.; Can also be entered on an East Africa Tourist Visa issued by Kenya or Rwanda.	No
Ukraine	Visa not required	90 days	90 days within any 180-day period.; The Canadian government advises its citizens not to visit Ukraine due to the Russian invasion of Ukraine.	No
United Arab Emirates	Visa not required	90 days	Visa Exemptions : Nationals of Canada with a normal passport for a maximum stay of 90 days. Information: The maximum stay is granted within 180 days.	Yes
United Kingdom	Electronic Travel Authorisation	6 months	Can use ePassport gates starting 1 June 2019.; UK-ETA isn't required if the passenger has a UK ancestry clearance visa.; ETA UK will be valid for 2 years.	Yes
United States	Visa not required	6 months	ESTA exempt. Canadian passport holders do not have to get an ESTA.; 6 month stay rather than typical 90 day VWP stay.; Most non immigrant statuses can be applied for on arrival at a port of entry.; Canada is not a Visa Waiver Program country, the permission to travel is from a different US immigration regulation.; Canadian Passport required and must be valid for the period of intended stay.; Canadian Passport exemptions only for nationals of Canada with a NEXUS card embarking in Canada or USA. For frequent travellers the NEXUS program is in place, allowing pre-approved, low-risk travellers to cross the Canada–United States border quickly.; Most Canadian citizens are not required to provide biometric data on entry.	Yes
Uruguay	Visa not required	3 months		No
Uzbekistan	Visa not required	30 days		No
Vanuatu	Visa not required	120 days		No
Vatican City	Visa not required	90 days	Open borders but de facto follows Italian visa policy.	Yes
Venezuela	eVisa		The Canadian government advises its citizens not to visit Venezuela due to the significant level of violent crime, unstable political and economic situation and the decline in basic living conditions.; Introduction of Electronic Visa System for Tourist and Business Travelers.	Yes
Vietnam	eVisa	90 days	30 days visa-free when visiting Phú Quốc.; e-Visa is valid for 90 days and multiple entry.; Foreign nationals entering Vietnam must fill out a digital arrival card before entering.	No
Yemen	Visa required		The Canadian government advises its citizens not to visit Yemen (including the island of Socotra) due to the ongoing armed conflict, terrorist attacks and kidnapping.; Canadians of Yemeni origins with a Yemeni identification document or a proof of Yemeni origins do not need a visa.; Yemen introduced an e-Visa system for visitors who meet certain eligibility requirements (group travel of 10 or more people, business trips, and transit etc.).	Yes
Zambia	Visa not required	90 days	Also eligible for a universal (KAZA) visa allowing access to Zimbabwe.; Duration maximum stay of 90 days(tourism) and 30 days (business) within 1 year.; e-Visas can be obtained before departure.	No
Zimbabwe	eVisa / Visa on Arrival	1 month	Eligible for a universal (KAZA) visa allowing access to Zambia.; The period of stay for a single-entry visa is one month.; Traveling as tourists can obtain a KAZAUNIVISA on arrival at Harare (HRE) and Victoria Falls (VFA). The visa is also valid for entry into Zambia and allows multiple entries between the two countries. The combined stay must not exceed 30 days. Offering convenience for travelers exploring multiple countries within the KAZA TFCA.; Eligible to obtain a visa allowing multiple entries upon arrival at the destination's port of entry, catering for frequent visitors. This visa is valid within a designated timeframe of six (6) months.	No

=== Dependent, disputed, or restricted territories ===
Visa requirements for Canadian citizens for visits to various territories, disputed areas, partially recognized countries, and restricted zones:

Africa

- British Indian Ocean Territory — special permit required.
- Eritrea (outside Asmara) — visa covers Asmara only; to travel in the rest of the country, a Travel Permit for Foreigners is required (20 Eritrean nakfa).
- Mayotte — Visa not required for 90 days with a 180-day period.
- Réunion — Visa not required for 90 days within a 180-day period.
- Saint Helena, Ascension and Tristan da Cunha
  - Ascension Island — e-Visa for 2 months within any year period
  - Saint Helena — Visitor's Pass granted on arrival valid for 4/10/21/60/90 days for 12/14/16/20/25 pound sterling.
  - Tristan da Cunha — Permission to land required for 15/30 pounds sterling (yacht/ship passenger) for Tristan da Cunha Island or 20 pounds sterling for Gough Island, Inaccessible Island or Nightingale Islands.
- Sahrawi Arab Democratic Republic (Western Sahara controlled territory) — undefined visa regime.
- Somaliland — visa required (30 days for 30 USD, payable on arrival).

Asia

- (China) Hainan — Visa not required for 30 days. Available at Haikou Meilan International Airport and Sanya Phoenix International Airport.
- Hong Kong — Visa not required for 3 months.
- India — Protected Area Permit (PAP) required for all of Arunachal Pradesh, Manipur, Mizoram and parts of Himachal Pradesh, Jammu and Kashmir and Uttarakhand. Restricted Area Permit (RAP) required for all of Andaman and Nicobar Islands and Lakshadweep and parts of Sikkim. Some of these requirements are occasionally lifted for a year.
- Iraqi Kurdistan - You can apply for an e-Visa (30 days) to visit the Iraqi Kurdistan Region.
- Macau — Visa not required for 30 days.
- North Korea outside Pyongyang - People are not allowed to leave the capital city, tourists can only leave the capital with a governmental tourist guide (no independent moving)
- (Tajikistan) Gorno-Badakhshan Autonomous Province — OIVR permit required (15+5 Tajikistani Somoni) and another special permit (free of charge) is required for Lake Sarez.
- (China) Tibet Autonomous Region — Tibet Travel Permit required.
- (United Nations) Korean Demilitarized Zone — restricted zone.
- (United Nations) UNDOF Zone and Ghajar — restricted zones.
- Arab League — Certain countries will deny access to holders of Israeli visas or passport stamps of Israel because of the Arab League boycott of Israel.
- Saudi Arabia — Non-Muslims are not allowed in Mecca or Medina.

Caribbean and North Atlantic

- Anguilla — Visa not required for 3 months.
- Aruba — Visa not required for 30 days.
- Bermuda — Visa not required.
- (Netherlands) Bonaire, St. Eustatius and Saba — Visa not required for 3 months.
- British Virgin Islands — Visa not required.
- Cayman Islands — Visa not required for 6 months.
- Curaçao — Visa not required for 3 months.
- Montserrat — Visa not required for 6 months.
- Puerto Rico — Visa not required for 180 days, same as the United States mainland.
- Sint Maarten — Visa not required for 3 months.
- Turks and Caicos Islands — Visa not required for 90 days.
- U.S. Virgin Islands — Visa not required for 6 months, same as the United States mainland.

Europe

- Abkhazia — Visa required. Tourists from all countries (except Georgia) can visit Abkhazia for a period not exceeding 24 hours as part of an organized tourist group.
- Mount Athos — Special permit required (4 days: EUR 25 for Orthodox visitors, EUR 35 for non-Orthodox visitors, EUR 18 for students). There is a visitors' quota: maximum 100 Orthodox and 10 non-Orthodox per day and women are not allowed.
- (Belarus) Brest and Grodno — Visa not required for 10 days.
- (Autonomous Republic of Crimea) Crimea — Visa issued by Russia is required.
- Northern Cyprus — Visa free access for 3 months. Passport required.
- (United Nations) UN Buffer Zone in Cyprus — Access Permit is required for travelling inside the zone, except Civil Use Areas.
- Gibraltar — Visa not required.
- (Norway) Jan Mayen — Permit issued by the local police required for staying for less than 24 hours and permit issued by the Norwegian police for staying for more than 24 hours.
- Svalbard of Norway — Right to live and work under the Svalbard Treaty.
- Kosovo — Visa free for 90 days.
- South Ossetia — To enter South Ossetia, visitors must have a multiple-entry visa for Russia and register their stay with the Migration Service of the Ministry of Internal Affairs within 3 days.
- Transnistria — Visa free. Registration required after 24h.

Oceania

- American Samoa — Electronic authorization for 30 days.
- (Australia) Ashmore and Cartier Islands — special authorisation required.
- (France) Clipperton Island — Special permit required.
- Cook Islands — Visa free access for 31 days.
- Guam — Visa not required.
- Niue — Visa on arrival valid for 30 days is issued free of charge.
- Northern Mariana Islands — Visa not required.
- Pitcairn Islands — 14 days visa free and landing fee USD 35 or tax of USD 5 if not going ashore.
- United States Minor Outlying Islands — special permits required for Baker Island, Howland Island, Jarvis Island, Johnston Atoll, Kingman Reef, Midway Atoll, Palmyra Atoll and Wake Island.

South America

- Galápagos — 60 days; Visitors must pre-register to receive a 20 USD Transit Control Card (TCT).

South Atlantic and Antarctica

- Falkland Islands — A visitor permit is normally issued as a stamp in the passport on arrival, The maximum validity period is 1 month.
- South Georgia and the South Sandwich Islands — Pre-arrival permit from the commissioner required (72 hours/1 month for 110/160 pounds sterling).
- Antarctica and adjacent islands — Special permits required for Bouvet Island, British Antarctic Territory, French Southern and Antarctic Lands, Argentine Antarctica, (Australia) Australian Antarctic Territory, (Antártica Chilena Province) Chilean Antarctic Territory, (Australia) Heard Island and McDonald Islands, (Norway) Peter I Island, (Norway) Queen Maud Land, (New Zealand) Ross Dependency.

== Pre-approved visas pick-up ==
Pre-approved visas can be picked up on arrival in the following countries instead of an embassy or consulate.

Pre-approved visas pick-up on arrival	Conditions
Bhutan	For a maximum stay of 15 days if the application was submitted at least 2 1/2 months before arrival and if the clearance was obtained.
Cameroon	Must hold approval from the General Delegate of Security.
Eritrea	Must have a sponsor who must submit an application at least 48 hours before arrival.
Liberia	Available only if arriving from a country without a diplomatic mission of Liberia and if a sponsor obtained an approval.
Nigeria	Holders of a visa application who have a Nigerian company taking responsibility for them.
Sudan	Holders of an entry permit issued by the Ministry of Interior.
Turkmenistan	Holders of an invitation letter from the local company that was approved by the Ministry of Foreign Affairs.

== Consular protection of Canadian citizens abroad ==
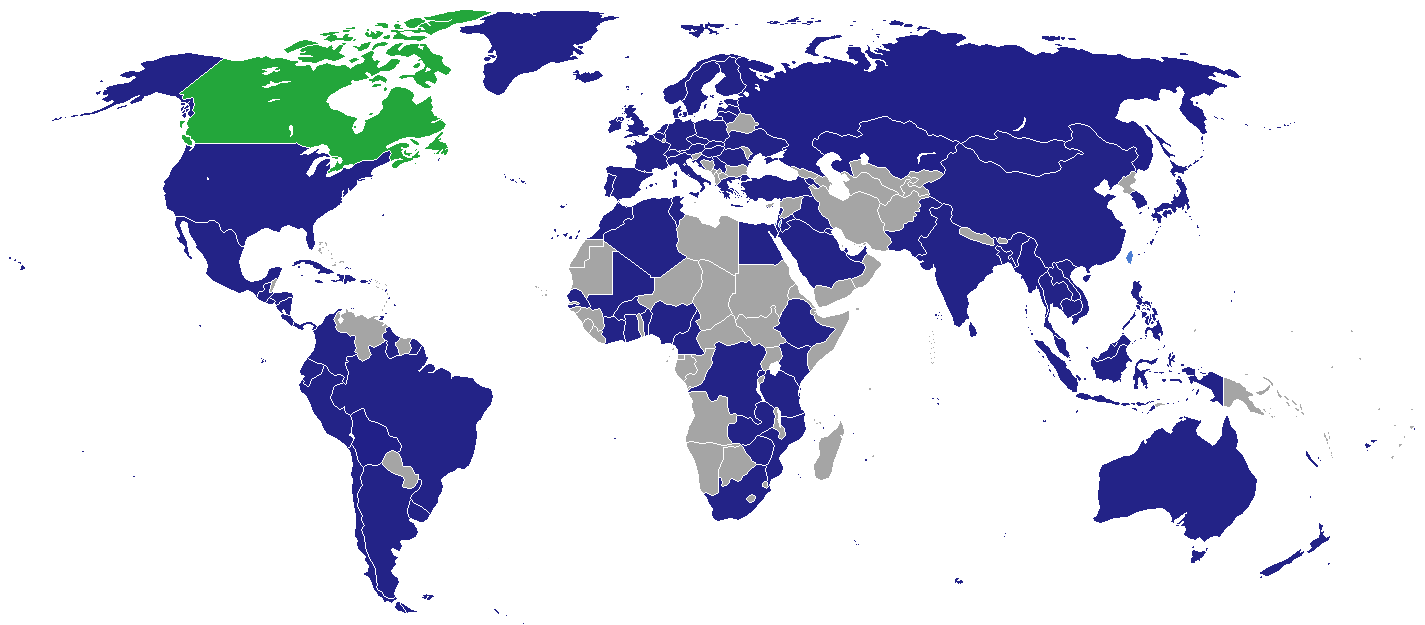
Countries that have a Canadian Embassy or High Commission are shown in blue. Canada is shown in green.

Canada has diplomatic and consular offices (including honorary consuls) in over 270 locations in approximately 180 foreign countries. In some countries Canadians may receive consular assistance from British missions or Australian missions under the Canada–Australia Consular Services Sharing Agreement.

== Non-visa restrictions ==
=== Blank passport pages ===
Many countries require a minimum number of blank pages to be available in the passport being presented, typically one or two pages. Endorsement pages, which often appear after the visa pages, are not counted as being valid or available.

=== Vaccination ===
Cover of the new International Certificate of Vaccination issued by the Bureau of Quarantine in the Philippines since 2021

The African countries of Angola, Benin, Burkina Faso, Burundi, Cameroon, Central African Republic, Democratic Republic of the Congo, Republic of the Congo, Côte d'Ivoire, Gabon, Ghana, Guinea-Bissau, Mali, Niger, Sierra Leone and Togo, South Sudan and Uganda, along with French Guiana in South America, require all incoming passengers older than nine months to one year, to have a current International Certificate of Vaccination or Prophylaxis.

Some other countries require vaccination only if the passenger is coming from an infected area or has visited one recently or has transited for 12 hours in those countries: Algeria, Botswana, Cabo Verde, Chad, Djibouti, Egypt, Eswatini, Ethiopia, Gambia, Ghana, Guinea, Lesotho, Libya, Equatorial Guinea, Eritrea, Madagascar, Malawi, Mauritania, Mauritius, Mozambique, Namibia, Nigeria, Papua New Guinea, Seychelles, Somalia, South Africa, Sudan, Tunisia, Uganda, Tanzania, Zambia and Zimbabwe.

=== Passport validity length ===
Very few countries, such as Paraguay, just require a valid passport on arrival.

However many countries and groupings now require only an identity card – especially from their neighbours. Other countries may have special bilateral arrangements that depart from the generality of their passport validity length policies to shorten the period of passport validity required for each other's citizens or even accept passports that have already expired (but not been cancelled).

Some countries, such as Japan, Ireland and the United Kingdom, require a passport valid throughout the period of the intended stay.

In the absence of specific bilateral agreements, countries requiring passports to be valid for at least 6 more months on arrival include Afghanistan, Algeria, Anguilla, Bahrain, Bhutan, Botswana, British Virgin Islands, Brunei, Cambodia, Cameroon, Cape Verde, Cayman Islands, Central African Republic, Chad, Comoros, Costa Rica, Côte d'Ivoire, Curaçao, Ecuador, Egypt, El Salvador, Equatorial Guinea, Fiji, Gabon, Guinea Bissau, Guyana, Haiti, India, Indonesia, Iran, Iraq, Israel, Jordan, Kenya, Kiribati, Kuwait, Laos, Madagascar, Malaysia, Marshall Islands, Mongolia, Myanmar, Namibia, Nepal, Nicaragua, Nigeria, Oman, Palau, Papua New Guinea, Peru, Philippines, Qatar, Rwanda, Samoa, Saudi Arabia, Singapore, Solomon Islands, Somalia, Sri Lanka, Sudan, Suriname, Tanzania, Thailand, Timor-Leste, Tokelau, Tonga, Turkey, Tuvalu, Uganda, United Arab Emirates, Vanuatu, Venezuela, and Vietnam.

Countries requiring passports valid for at least 4 months on arrival include Micronesia and Zambia.

Countries requiring passports with a validity of at least 3 months beyond the date of intended departure include Azerbaijan, Bosnia and Herzegovina, Honduras, Montenegro, Nauru, Moldova and New Zealand. Similarly, the EEA countries of Iceland, Liechtenstein, Norway, all European Union countries (except Ireland) together with Switzerland also require 3 months validity beyond the date of the bearer's intended departure unless the bearer is an EEA or Swiss national.

Countries requiring passports valid for at least 3 months on arrival include Albania, North Macedonia, Panama, and Senegal.

Bermuda requires passports to be valid for at least 45 days upon entry.

Countries that require a passport validity of at least one month beyond the date of intended departure include Eritrea, Hong Kong, Lebanon, Macau, the Maldives and South Africa.

==== Maximum passport age ====
Countries of the Schengen area require non-EU passports to be less than 10 years old upon entry.

=== Criminal record ===
Some countries, including Australia, Canada, Fiji, New Zealand and the United States, routinely deny entry to non-citizens who have a criminal record, while others impose restrictions depending on the type of conviction and the length of the sentence.

=== Persona non grata ===
The government of a country can declare a diplomat persona non grata, banning them from entering the country or expelling them if they have already entered. In non-diplomatic use, the authorities of a country may also declare a foreigner persona non grata permanently or temporarily, usually because of unlawful activity.

=== Israeli stamps ===
Kuwait, Lebanon, Libya, and Yemen do not allow entry to people with passport stamps from Israel or whose passports have either a used or an unused Israeli visa, or where there is evidence of previous travel to Israel such as entry or exit stamps from neighbouring border posts in transit countries such as Jordan and Egypt.

To circumvent this Arab League boycott of Israel, the Israeli immigration services have now mostly ceased to stamp foreign nationals' passports on either entry to or exit from Israel (unless the entry is for some work-related purposes). Since 15 January 2013, Israel no longer stamps foreign passports at Ben Gurion Airport. Passports are still (as of 22 June 2017) stamped at Erez when passing into and out of Gaza.

Iran refuses admission to holders of passports containing an Israeli visa or stamp that is less than 12 months old.

=== Biometrics ===
Several countries mandate that all travellers, or all foreign travellers, be fingerprinted on arrival and will refuse admission to or even arrest travellers who refuse to comply. In some countries, such as the United States, this may apply even to transit passengers who merely wish to change planes rather than go landside.

Fingerprinting countries/regions include Afghanistan, Argentina, Brunei, Cambodia, China, Ethiopia, Ghana, Guinea, India, Japan, Kenya (both fingerprints and a photo are taken), Malaysia upon entry and departure, Mongolia, Saudi Arabia, the Schengen Area, Singapore, South Korea, Taiwan, Thailand, Uganda, the United Arab Emirates and the United States.

Many countries also require a photo be taken of people entering the country. The United States, which does not fully implement exit control formalities at its land frontiers (although long mandated by its own legislation), intends to implement facial recognition for passengers departing from international airports to identify people who overstay their visa.

Together with fingerprint and face recognition, iris scanning is one of three biometric identification technologies internationally standardised since 2006 by the International Civil Aviation Organization (ICAO) for use in e-passports and the United Arab Emirates conducts iris scanning on visitors who need to apply for a visa. The United States Department of Homeland Security has announced plans to greatly increase the biometric data it collects at US borders. In 2018, Singapore began trials of iris scanning at three land and maritime immigration checkpoints.

== Visa requirements amendment log ==
Visa requirements for Canadian citizens were lifted by Austria in 1956, Finland in 1958, Japan (20 September 1964), Micronesia (18 December 1980), Taiwan (1 January 1994), Ukraine (1 August 2005), Kyrgyzstan (27 July 2012), Mongolia (1 January 2014), Kazakhstan (1 January 2017), Argentina (1 January 2018), Armenia (10 July 2018), Brazil (17 June 2019). and Turkey (1 January 2024)

Canadian citizens were made eligible for eVisas by India (1 May 2015), Brazil (25 January 2018, visa free from 17 June 2019 to 10 April 2025), Angola (30 March 2018)., Namibia (1 April 2025) and Brazil (10 April 2025)

== Foreign travel statistics ==
The following data from the Statistics Canada National Travel Survey estimate the number of visits made by Canadian residents to most-visited countries in the year 2025.

Destination	Number of visits (thousands)
United States	23,096
Mexico	2,662
Bahamas	188
Barbados	113
Cuba	706
Dominican Republic	984
Jamaica	203
Argentina	52
Brazil	138
Colombia	79
Costa Rica	305
Panama	31
Peru	66
Austria	146
Belgium	113
Croatia	135
Czech Republic	122
Denmark	67
France	977
Germany	270
Greece	332
Hungary	54
Iceland	83
Ireland	213
Italy	805
Netherlands	248
Norway	52
Poland	56
Portugal	571
Spain	580
Sweden	35
Switzerland	155
Turkey	99
United Kingdom	878
Morocco	137
South Africa	39
China (excluding Hong Kong)	617
Hong Kong	283
India	248
Indonesia	39
Japan	695
Philippines	187
Singapore	119
South Korea	149
Taiwan	146
Thailand	124
United Arab Emirates	92
Viet Nam	92
Australia	101

== See also ==
- Visa policy of Canada
- Canadian passport
