= Visa policy of Papua New Guinea =

Policy on permits required to enter Papua New Guinea

Visitors to Papua New Guinea must obtain either a visa on arrival or an e-Visa. Visitors may also apply for a visa from one of the PNG diplomatic missions.

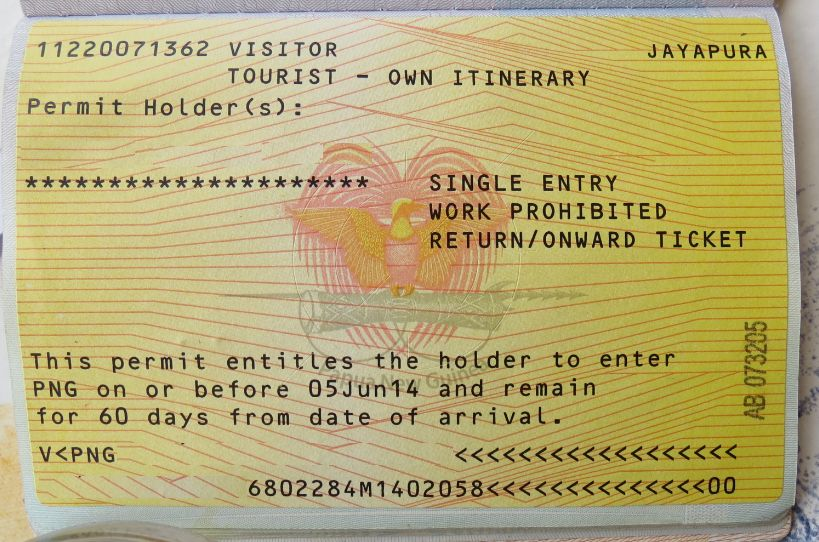
Visa sticker

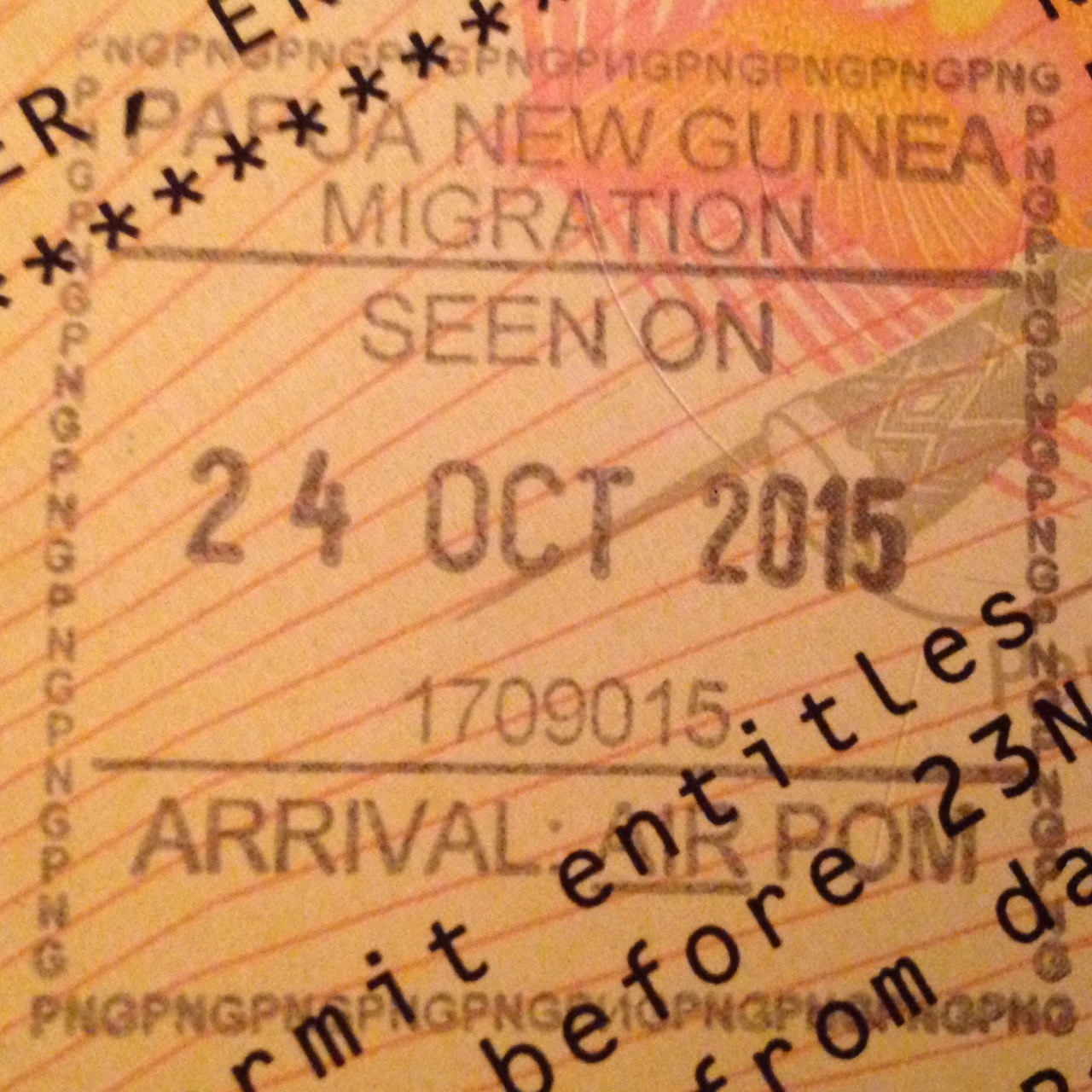
Entry stamp

All visitors must have a passport valid for at least 6 months.

== Visa policy map ==
Visa policy of Papua New Guinea Papua New Guinea Individual visa on arrival (60 days) / Easy Visitor Permit (60 days) Visa on arrival for group tours / eVisa Easy Visitor Permit (60 days) Easy Visitor Permit (30 days) eVisa

== Visa on arrival ==
Citizens of the following countries and regions may obtain a visa on arrival valid for 60 days (unless otherwise noted) at Port Moresby International Airport.

- American Samoa
- Canada
- Cook Islands
- Fiji
- French Polynesia
- Guam
- Indonesia
- Israel
- Japan
- Kiribati
- Marshall Islands
- Micronesia
- Nauru
- New Caledonia
- Niue
- Northern Mariana Islands
- Palau
- Samoa
- Singapore
- Solomon Islands
- Tokelau
- Tonga
- Tuvalu
- United Arab Emirates
- United Kingdom
- Vanuatu
- Wallis and Futuna

- China
Citizens of China holding ordinary passports can obtain a visa on arrival when entering Papua New Guinea on a group tour through a travel agency registered in Papua New Guinea.

In addition, citizens of China, Indonesia and Japan holding diplomatic or official passports may obtain a visa on arrival, valid for a maximum stay of 30 days.

Holders of passports from all Pacific Island States are eligible for Visa on arrival at all authorized ports of entry in Papua New Guinea, specifically Jacksons International Airport and Wutung land border post. The Immigration Department said VOA does not apply to diplomats and civil servants on formal long-term contracts, but only to those visiting on short-term contracts.

=== Future changes ===
Papua New Guinea has signed visa exemption agreements with the following countries, but they have not yet entered into force:

Country	Passports	Agreement signed on
South Korea	Diplomatic, official	29 May 2023
India	Diplomatic, official	21 May 2023

== Electronic visa (e-Visa) ==
Citizens of all countries and regions may apply for e-Visa according to their purposes of visit.

e-Visas have the following classes:

- Business Visa Classes
- Entertainer Visa Classes
- Restricted Visa Classes
- Special Exemption Visa Classes
- Visitor Visa Classes
- Working Resident Visa Classes

Among them, there are the following types of Visitor Visa Classes:

- Easy Visitor Permit
- Journalist
- Sportsperson
- Tourist - Own Itinerary
- Tourist - Tour Package
- Visiting Relatives
- Yachtperson

Visa fees vary for each class and type.

=== Easy Visitor Permit ===
Citizens of the following countries and regions may obtain an Easy Visitor Permit (EVP) whose duration of stay is 30 or 60 days online. The EVP cannot be extended.

Applications lodged via the e-Visa portal will attract a fee of 50 USD. This EVP is valid for a single entry and expressly prohibits the holder from engaging in paid work.

60 days

- All European Union member states^{1}

- Andorra
- Argentina
- Brazil
- Brunei
- Canada
- Chile
- Ecuador
- Fiji
- Hong Kong
- Iceland
- Indonesia
- Israel
- Japan
- Kiribati
- Liechtenstein
- Macau
- Malaysia
- Maldives
- Marshall Islands
- Mexico
- Micronesia
- Monaco
- Nauru
- New Zealand^{2}
- Norway
- Palau
- Peru
- Philippines
- Samoa
- San Marino
- Singapore
- Solomon Islands
- South Korea
- Switzerland
- Taiwan
- Thailand
- Tonga
- Tuvalu
- United Kingdom
- United States^{3}
- Uruguay
- Vanuatu
- Vatican City

30 days

- Antigua and Barbuda
- Australia
- Bahamas
- Barbados
- Belize
- Botswana
- Dominica
- Grenada
- Guyana
- India
- Jamaica
- Kenya
- Lesotho
- Mauritius
- Namibia
- Russia
- Rwanda
- Saint Kitts and Nevis
- Saint Lucia
- Saint Vincent and the Grenadines
- Seychelles
- South Africa
- Trinidad and Tobago
- Vietnam
- Zambia

_{1 - Also applicable to passports issued to residents of French and Dutch territories in the Caribbean.}
_{2 - Also applicable to passports issued to residents of Cook Islands, Niue and Tokelau.}
_{3 - Also applicable to passports issued to residents of Guam, Northern Mariana Islands, Puerto Rico and Virgin Islands.}

=== Tourist Visa ===
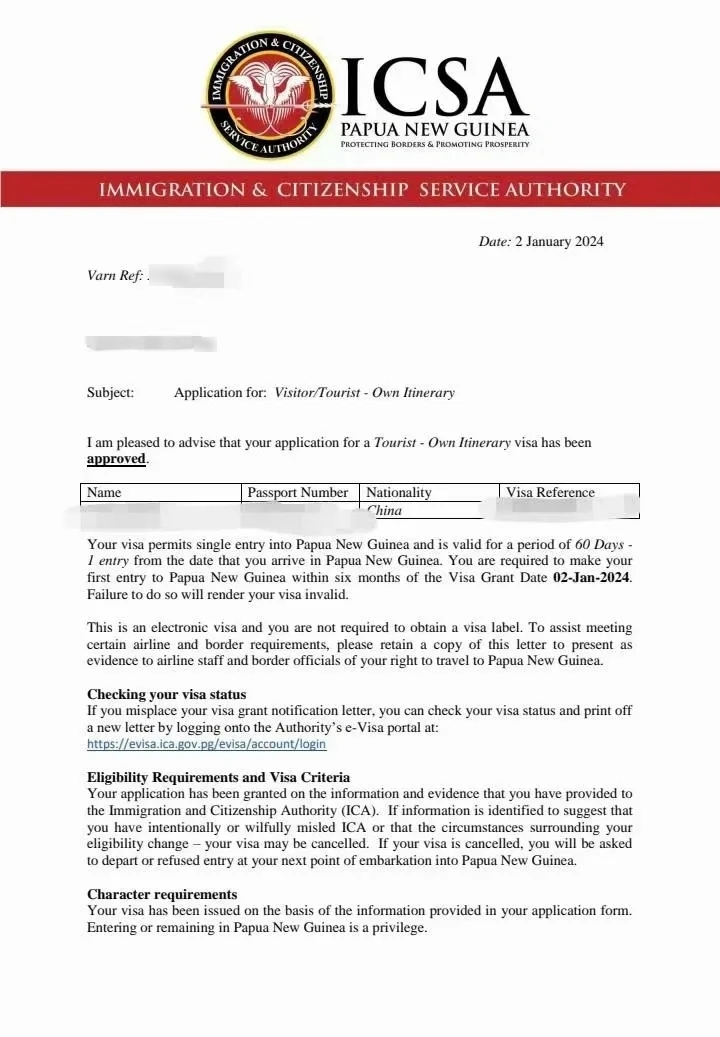
Sample of tourist visa

Citizens of countries not included in the Easy Visitor Permit and regions may apply for a Tourist Visa according to their purposes of visit. Tourist visas are classified into Own Itinerary for individual tourists and Tour Package for group tourists.

These visas can be obtained by paying 50 USD online lodgement fee, it is valid for 6 months, single entry and allows visitors stay up to 60 days. Tourist Visa can be extended.

== APEC Business Travel Card ==
Holders of passports issued by the following countries who possess an APEC Business Travel Card (ABTC) containing a "PNG" code on the reverse side, which indicates that it is valid for travel to Papua New Guinea, can enter Papua New Guinea without a visa for business trips for up to 60 days.

ABTCs are issued to citizens of:

- Australia
- Brunei
- Chile
- China
- Hong Kong
- Indonesia
- Japan
- South Korea
- Malaysia
- Mexico
- New Zealand
- Peru
- Philippines
- Russia
- Singapore
- Taiwan
- Thailand
- Vietnam

== Visitor statistics ==
Most visitors arriving in Papua New Guinea were from the following countries of nationality:

Rank	Country or territory	2016	2015	2014
1	Australia	88,092	91,368	93,433
2	Philippines	14,090	13,569	13,745
3	China	12,937	10,255	8,970
4	United States	12,181	12,762	11,668
5	New Zealand	10,265	10,149	10,698
6	Indonesia	7,827	6,763	5,896
7	United Kingdom	6,974	7,399	6,994
8	Malaysia	5,558	5,306	4,759
9	India	4,293	4,012	3,476
10	Germany	3,276	3,557	3,300
	Total	197,632	198,685	191,442

== See also ==
- Visa requirements for Papua New Guinean citizens
- Foreign relations of Papua New Guinea
