= Norvegia Bay =

Bay located on Peter I Island, Antarctica

Coordinates: 68°45′S 90°42′W

Norvegia Bay is a cove at the north side of Cape Ingrid on the west side of Peter I Island. Named after the Norvegia, the Norwegian research vessel which visited the island in February 1929. The crew engaged in charting the island and in sounding and dredging operations.
