= Cape Ingrid =

Dark rock promontory In Antarctica

- Cape
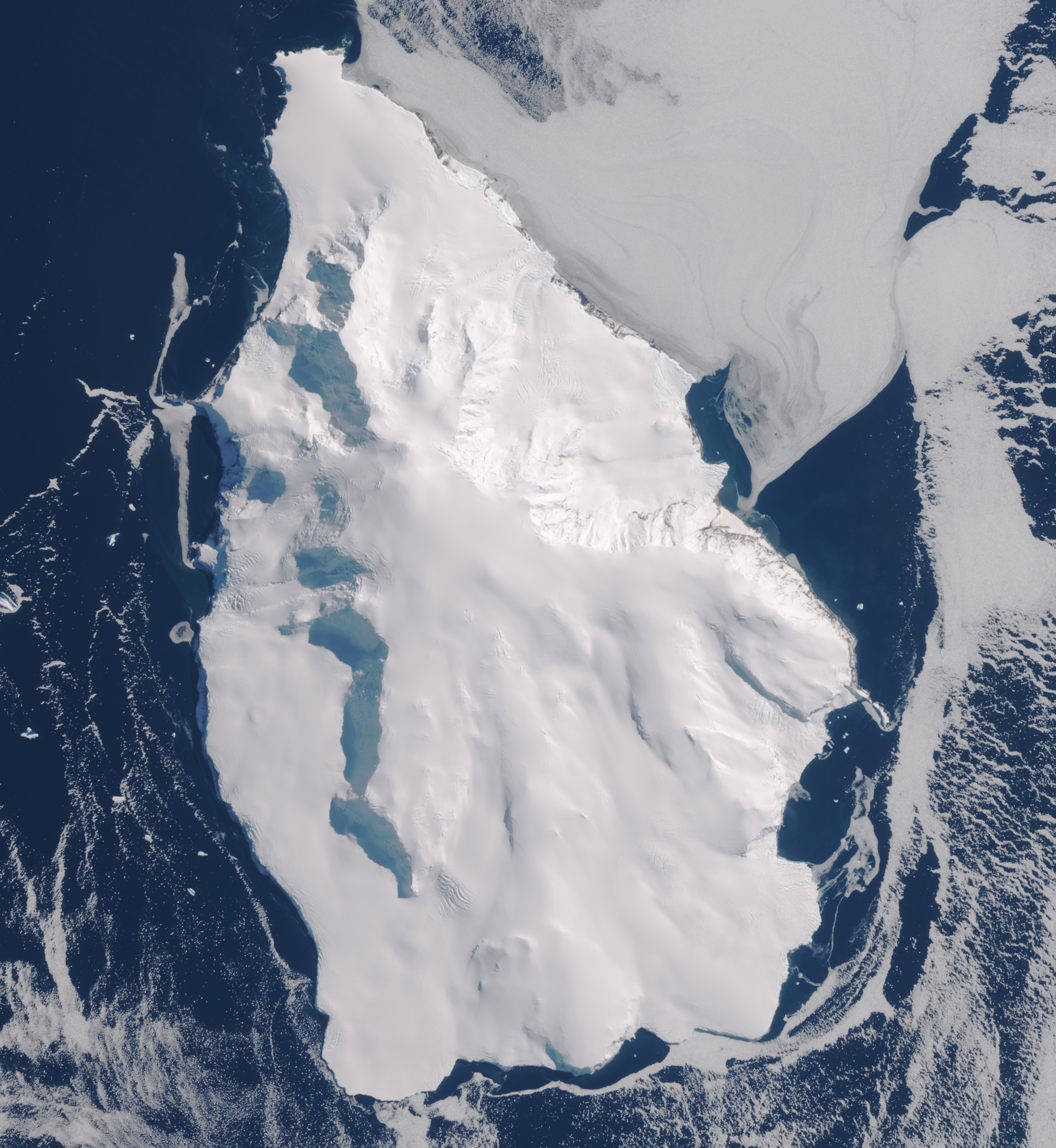
- Interactive map of Cape Ingrid
- Location: Peter I Island, Antarctica (68°46′S 90°42′W)
- Etymology: Named after Ingrid Christensen

Cape Ingrid (68°46′S 90°42′W) is a dark rock promontory separating Norvegia Bay and Sandefjord Cove on the west side of Peter I Island, Antarctica.

It was discovered in 1927 by a Norwegian expedition under Eyvind Tofte in the Odd I, a vessel of Lars Christensen's whaling fleet, and named for Ingrid Christensen, the wife of Lars.
