= Nils Larsen =

Norwegian sea captain (1900–1976)

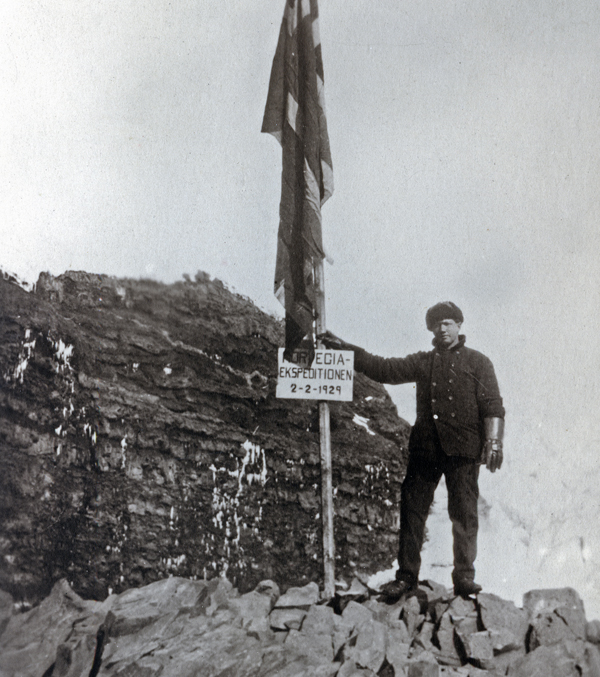
Larsen on Peter I Island in 1929

Nils Larsen (19 June 1900 – 29 September 1976) was a Norwegian sea captain. Larsen is perhaps most associated with the Norvegia expeditions of Antarctica.

Larsen was born in Sandeherad Municipality, and became a noted whaler, captaining a number of whaling ships principally for Thor Dahl A/S of Sandefjord. He also served as a first mate on Norvegia expeditions of Antarctica financed by Norwegian whale-ship owner Lars Christensen. During these expeditions, Norway achieved annexation of Bouvet Island (1927) and Peter I Island (1929).

Larsen died in Sandefjord Municipality, at the age of 76. Geographical areas in Antarctica named after him include: Mount Nils Larsen (Queen Maud Land), Mount Nils (Enderby Land) and Nils Larsen Glacier (Peter I Island).
