= Mount Christensen =

Mountain in Enderby Land, Antarctica

Mount Christensen (67°58′S 47°52′E) is a prominent ice-covered mountain, 1,475 metres (4,840 ft) high, at the southwest side of Rayner Glacier in Enderby Land. It was discovered on 13 January 1930 by the British Australian New Zealand Antarctic Research Expedition under Mawson, who named it for Consul Lars Christensen, Norwegian whaling magnate and promoter of several Norwegian Antarctic expeditions.
