= SS Odd I =

Norwegian whaling ship

History
- Name: Dominion II (1912–1921); Odd I (1921–1940); Orkan (1940–1945); Odd I (1945–1964); Annstein (1964–1971)
- Owner: A/S Dominion Whaling Ltd (1912–1920); A/S Odd (1920–1922); A/S Odd I (1922–1925); Bryde & Dahls Hvalfangerselskap A/S (1925–1932); Thorland Ltd (1932–1938); O Telnes (1938); Partrederi Odd I (1938–1940); Kriegsmarine (1940–1945); Partrederi Odd I (1945–1950); P/R Odd (1950–1963); Gerh. Midttveit (1963–1971)
- Operator: T.Dannevig & Co (1912–1918); Chr. Christensen jr. A/S (1918–1922); I Bryde & L Thorsen (1922–1925); Bryde & Dahls Hvalfangerselskap A/S (1925–1932); A/S Thor Dahl (1932–1938); O Telnes (1938); Partrederi Odd I (1938–1940); Kriegsmarine (1940–1945); Partrederi Odd I (1945–1950); H Methlie (1950–1963); Gerh. Midttveit (1963–1971)
- Port of registry: Sandefjord, Norway (1912– ); (Norway) Porsgrund ( –1932); London, United Kingdom (1932–1938); (Norway) Bergen (1938–1940); Kriegsmarine (1940–1945); (Norway) Bergen (1945–1971)
- Yard number: 68
- Launched: July 1912
- In service: 1912-1971
- Out of service: 1971
- Identification: Code Letters MHQS (1912–1934); Code Letters LKBK (1939–1940, 1945–1971); Pennant number V 5103 (1940); Pennant number V 5104 (1941–1942); Pennant number V 5102 (1942–1945)
- Fate: Scrapped

General characteristics
- Tonnage: 156 GRT, 50 NRT (1912–1947); 218 GRT, 82 NRT (1947–1971)
- Length: 31.70 metres (104 ft 0 in) (1912–1947); 40.06 metres (131 ft 5 in) (1947–1971)
- Beam: 6.12 metres (20 ft 1 in)
- Depth: 3.56 metres (11 ft 8 in)
- Installed power: Triple expansion steam engine, 58 nhp (1912–1939); Diesel engine, 111 nhp (1939–1947), 400 bhp / 64 nhp (1947–1971)
- Propulsion: Screw propeller

Odd I was a 156 GRT Norwegian whaler, launched in 1912 as Dominion II. She was renamed Odd I in 1921 and retained that name until 1963 when she became Annstein, except for a period during World War II when she served as a Vorpostenboot for the German Kriegsmarine under the name Orkan. She was condemned in 1971 and was deleted from the Norwegian Ship Register on 15 March 1971.

== Description ==
The ship was 31.70 metres (104 ft 0 in) long, with a beam of 6.12 metres (20 ft 1 in) and a depth of 3.56 metres (11 ft 8 in). She was assessed at 156 GRT, 50 NRT. She was powered by a triple expansion steam engine which drive a single screw propeller. It had cylinders of 30 centimetres (12 in), 51 centimetres (20 in) and 84 centimetres (33 in) diameter by 61 centimetres (24 in) stroke. The engine was rated at 58 nhp.

== History ==
Dominion II was built in 1912 as yard number 68 by Porsgrund Mekaniske Værksted, Porsgrund for A/S Dominion Whaling Ltd, Sandefjord. She was launched in July. The Code Letters MHSQ were allocated and her port of registry was Sandefjord. She was operated under the management of T. Dannevig & Co. Sandefjord. In December 1918, she was placed under the management of Chr. Christensen jr. A/S, Sandefjord. In May 1920, Dominion II was transferred to A/S Odd, Sandefjord. She was renamed Odd I in May 1921.

In 1922, she was sold to A/S Odd I and placed under the management of I Bryde & L Thorsen, Sandefjord. In September 1925, she was sold to Bryde & Dahls Hvalfangerselskap A/S, Sandefjord.

=== Antarctic expedition ===
The Odd I expedition was the first of nine scientific expeditions in the Antarctic fitted out by Lars Christensen. It was led by Eyvind Tofte, with Anton A. Andersson serving as captain. The expedition arrived at Peter I Island on 17 January 1927, but was unable to land. They then circumnavigated the island and discovered Cape Ingrid.

They also found and named Cecil Cave, a sea cave which indents the southern part of Cape Ingrid on the west coast of Peter I Island in Antarctica. It was discovered and named by a Norwegian expedition under Eyvind Tofte in January 1927. Tofte and the second mate rowed into the cave in an unsuccessful attempt to land on the island.

By 1930, her port of registry was changed to Porsgrund. In 1932, she was sold to Thorland Ltd. Her port of registry was changed to London, United Kingdom. She was operated under the management of A/S Thor Dahl. In 1938, she was sold to Ole Telnes, Bergen. Her port of registry was changed to Bergen and the Code Letters LKBK were allocated. A new diesel engine was fitted in 1938. The engine was a two-stroke single cycle single action engine manufactured by M. Haldorsen & Sön. It had two cylinders of 451 mm (17 3/4 in) bore by 502 mm (19 3/4 in) stroke and was rated at 111 nhp. In December 1938, she was sold to Partrederi Odd I, Bergen.

=== World War II ===
After the onset of the German occupation of Norway, on 15 June 1940 the occupying authorities acquired Odd I. They then took her into service as a Vorpostenboote in the 51 Vorpostenflotille under the name Orkan. She was allocated the Pennant number V 5103. This was changed to V 5104 on 1 January 1941 and V 5102 in May 1942.

On 7 January 1942 she was escorting two German freighters, SS Hedwigschütte and SS Eisenblick, when they were bombed by Armstrong Whitworth Whitley aircraft of the Royal Air Force. They were also shelled by HMS Inglefield and HMS Intrepid of the Royal Navy. During the attack the crew of V 5104 Orkan beached their vessel at Florø to avoid sinking. After Germany's defeat, Norwegian authorities returned her to her owners on 11 June 1945.

=== Post-war ===
Odd I returned to mercantile service. A new Gørlitz diesel engine was fitted in 1947 and she was lengthened by 8.36 metres (27 ft 5 in). She was assessed at 218 GRT, 82 NRT. She was sold to P/R Odd, Bergen in 1959 and placed under the management of H Methlie. In 1963. Odd I was sold to Gerh. Midttveit, Bergen and renamed Annstein. In 1966 she became a purse seiner.. She served until 1971 when she was condemned.
