= Peter I Island =

Norwegian island in Antarctica

Peter I Island Peter I Øy (Norwegian)
- Dependent territory of Norway
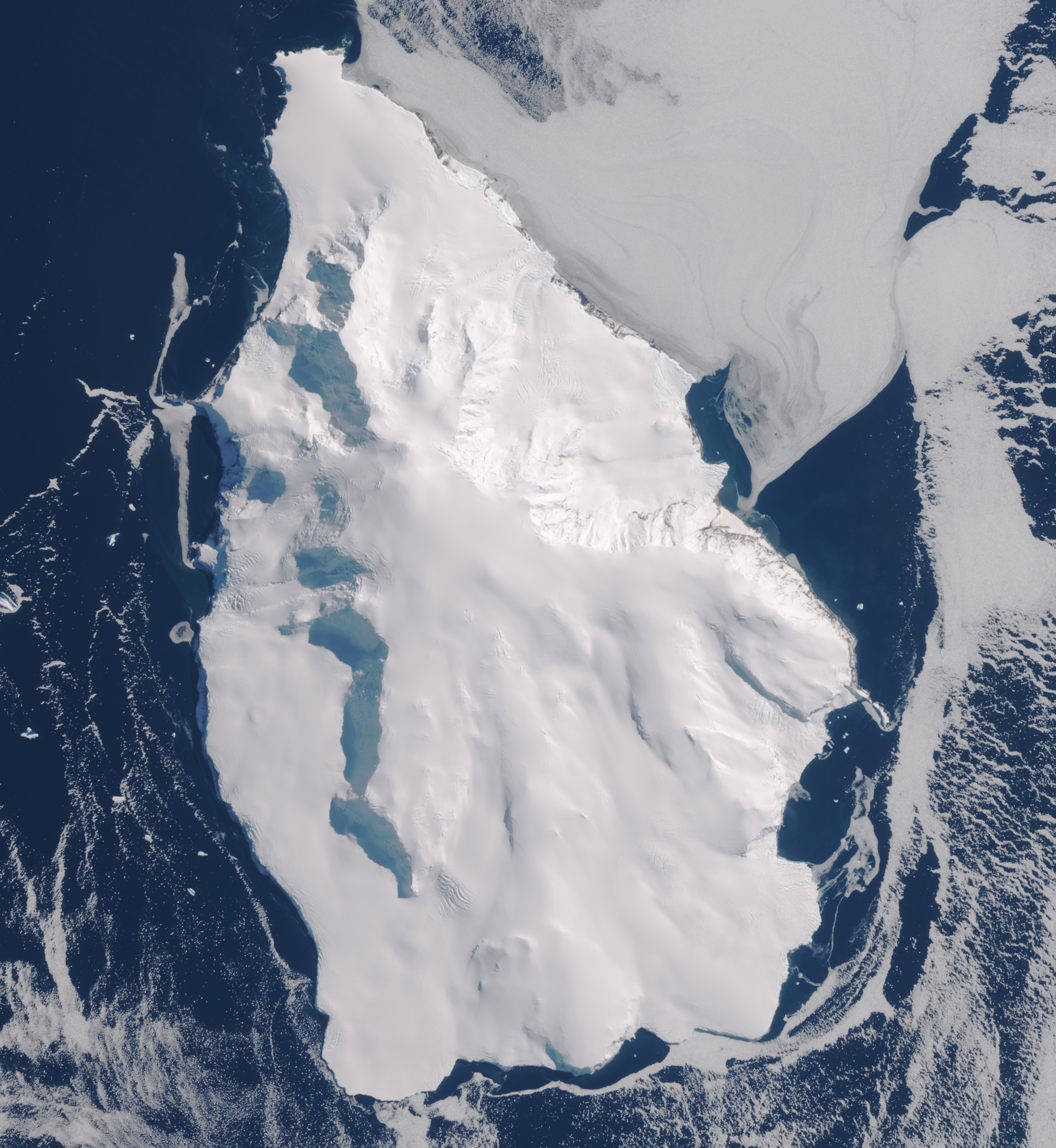
- December 2022 satellite image of Peter I Island

- Flag

- Location of Peter I Island (circled in red, relative to Antarctica)
- Sovereign state: Norway
- Claimed by Norway: 6 March 1931
- Antarctic Treaty: 23 June 1961

Area
  - Total: 154 km^{2} (59 sq mi)
  - Glaciated: 95%
- Highest elevation: 1,640 m (5,380 ft)
- ISO 3166 code: AQ
- Internet TLD: .aq; .no

Peter I Island (Norwegian: Peter I Øy) is an uninhabited volcanic island in the Bellingshausen Sea, 450 kilometres (240 nmi) from continental Antarctica. It is claimed as a dependency of Norway and, along with Bouvet Island and Queen Maud Land, composes one of the three Norwegian dependent territories in the Antarctic and Subantarctic. The island measures approximately 11 by 19 kilometres (7 by 12 mi), with an area of 156 km^{2} (60 sq mi); its highest point is the ultra-prominent, 1,640-metre-tall (5,380 ft) Lars Christensen Peak. Nearly all the island is covered by a glacier, and it is surrounded most of the year by pack ice, making it inaccessible during these times. There is little vertebrate animal life on the island, apart from some seabirds and seals.

The island was first sighted by Fabian Gottlieb von Bellingshausen on 21 January 1821 and was named after Peter I of Russia. Not until 2 February 1929 did anyone set foot on the island, when Nils Larsen and Ola Olstad's second Norvegia expedition, financed by Lars Christensen, was successful. They claimed it for Norway, which annexed it in 1931 and made it a dependency in 1933. The next landing occurred in 1948, and the island has been subject to some scientific research and a limited amount of tourism. The island became subject to the Antarctic Treaty in 1961. Since 1987, there has been an automated meteorological station on the island. Three amateur radio DX-peditions have visited the island, and there are sporadic landings by tourists.

== History ==
The first sighting of Peter I Island was made on 21 October 1821 by Fabian Gottlieb von Bellingshausen's expedition, who commanded the ships Vostok and Mirny under the Russian flag. He named the island after Tsar Peter I of Russia. Drift ice made it impossible for Bellinghausen to come nearer than 25 kilometers (16 mi) from the island. It was the first land to have been spotted south of the Antarctic Circle, and was thus also the southernmost sighted land at the time of its discovery. In January 1910, the French expedition led by Jean-Baptiste Charcot and his ship Pourquoi-Pas confirmed Bellingshausen's discovery, but they also did not land, being stopped 5 kilometers (3.1 mi) from the island by pack ice.

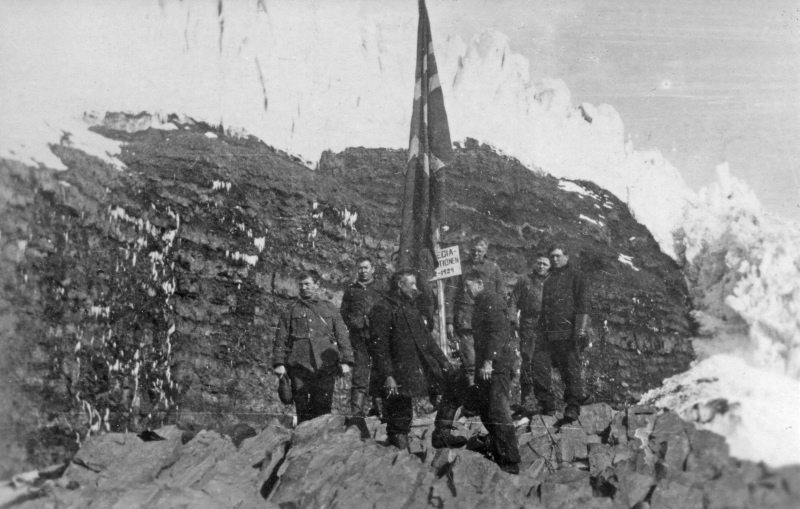
The first landing on the island (1929)

In 1926 and 1927, the Norwegian sailor Eyvind Tofte circumnavigated and surveyed the island from Odd I. However, he was also prevented from landing. The Norwegian whale-ship owner Lars Christensen financed several expeditions to the Antarctic, in part for research and in part to claim land for Norway. The latter was motivated by the British taxation of whaling stations in the Antarctic, and Christensen hoped to be able to establish stations on Norwegian territory to gain better privileges and so at least the taxes went to his home country. The first expedition to land on the island was the Christensen-financed second Norvegia expedition, led by Nils Larsen and Ola Olstad. They landed on 2 February 1929 and claimed the island for Norway. Larsen attempted to land again in 1931, but was hindered by pack ice. On 6 March 1931, a Norwegian royal proclamation declared the island under Norwegian sovereignty and on 23 March 1933 the island was declared a dependency.

The next landing occurred on 10 February 1948 by Larsen's ship Brategg. Biological, geological and hydrographic surveys underwent for three days, before the pack ice forced the expedition to leave. The expedition built a hut and placed a copy of the document of occupation from 1929 inside. On 23 June 1961, Peter I Island became subject to the Antarctic Treaty, after Norway's signing of the treaty in 1959. Since then, there have been several landings on the island by various nations for scientific investigations, as well as a limited number of ships that have successfully landed tourists on the island.

In 1987, the Norwegian Polar Institute sent five scientists to spend eleven days on the island. The main focuses were aerial photography and topographical measurements to allow an accurate map of the island to be produced. The second important area was marine biological investigations, although also geological, biological and other surveys were conducted. The team also built an automatic weather station. Three DX-peditions have been sent to the island, in 1987, 1994 and 2006. Due to geographic isolation and the island's glacier terrain perched vertically above antarctic seas, this station is considered one of the most challenging QSL stations to operate (requiring two helicopters) when it is active.

== Geography ==
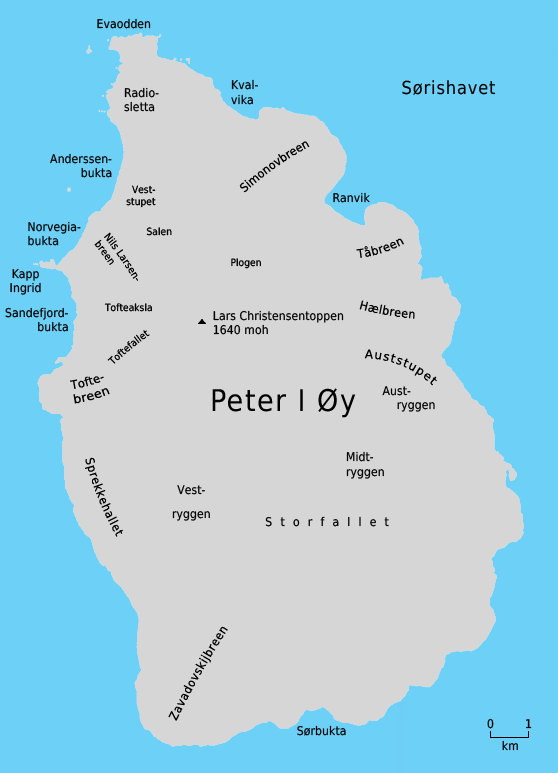
Map of the island

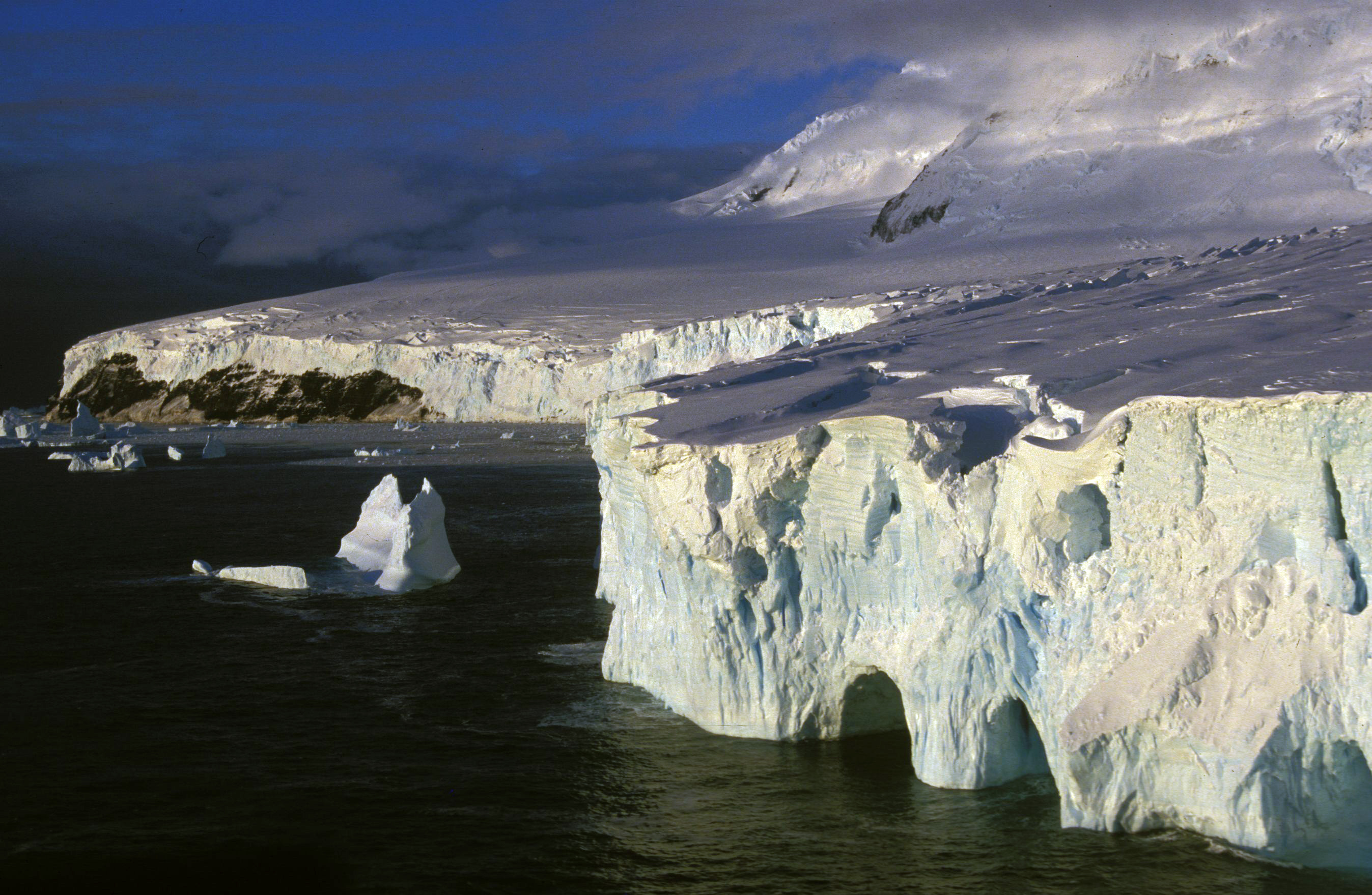
Coastline of Peter I Island, visited during an expedition of the German research icebreaker RV Polarstern in 1994

Peter I Island is a volcanic island located 450 kilometres (280 mi) off the coast of Ellsworth Land of continental Antarctica, and about 1,400 km (870 mi) to the south-west of Smith Island, the nearest of the South Shetland Islands. It has an area of 154 square kilometres (59 sq mi). The island is almost entirely covered by glacier, with about 95% of the surface covered by ice.

Surrounding the island is a 40-meter (130 ft) tall ice front and vertical cliffs. The long stretches of ice caps are supplemented with rock outcrops. Landing is only possible at three points, and only during the short period of the year in which the island is not surrounded by pack ice. These landings take place on the west side at Kapp Ingrid Christensen, a peninsula which divides the bays Norvegiabukta and Sandefjordbukta. On the cape are some narrow strips of beach, which are suitable for landing. The beach in Norvegiabukta is just 4 meters (13 ft) wide and is entered via the natural arch Tsarporten. On the west side is a plateau, while the north and south coasts feature ice shelves. The eastern side is the steepest and features two rock columns with flat tops in the sea.

The island is a shield volcano, although it is not known if it is still active, and it has been categorized as either Holocene or historic, based on date samples ranging from 0.1 to 0.35 million years ago. The summit, Lars Christensen Peak, is a 100-metre (330 ft) wide circular crater. An ultra-prominent peak at 1,640 metres (5,380 ft) elevation, it is named after Lars Christensen. It is not known whether this volcano is extinct or not, because the upper part is apparently unmodified by glaciation, indicating an eruption several centuries ago.

== Environment ==
The island has a very harsh climate with strong winds and freezing temperatures. The vegetation of the island consists exclusively of mosses and lichens which have adapted to the extreme Antarctic climate of Peter I Island. Seaweed and algae also exist. The steady snowfall keeps the vegetation here to a minimum.

== Biodiversity ==
The islands biodiversity have only been subjected to a limited number of studies and a limited number of taxonomic groups. Despite this, it has been found that this island is host to a high degree of biodiversity with it being much more biodiverse than any other part of the Bellingshausen Sea. An example of the islands diversity can be seen with a study by (Troncoso et al. 2007) where they pulled only four box cores of marine sediment and revealed 22 species of mollusk.

=== Birds ===
The island is a breeding ground for a few seabirds, particularly southern fulmars, but also Wilson's storm petrels and Antarctic terns. Penguins, including Adélie and chinstrap penguins, visit the island infrequently.

=== Mammals ===
There are numerous seals, particularly crabeater seals, leopard seals and smaller numbers of southern elephant seals. The island also contains Weddell seals. The island has many species of whales such as humpback whales, Antarctic minke whales, sei whales, blue whales, fin whales, and sperm whales.

=== Plants ===
The only plants on the island are mosses and lichens with seaweed and algae located in the surrounding sea. Algal species that live around the island include Desmarestia anceps, Sarcopeltis skottsbergii, Iridaea cordata, Myriogramme manginii, Phycodrys quercifolia, Prasiola crispa, and various species of Plocamium.

=== History of research ===
The high amount of biodiversity that the island has was not always known. Information about benthic macrofauna of the island and surrounding sea was scarce. This scarcity of knowledge is likely due to poor sampling. The BENTART program (BENTART 03, from 24 January – 3 March 2003 and BENTART 06, 2 January – 17 February 2006) had RV Hesperides sent to the island where a more detailed study of the benthic life, such as mollusks, can be done.

== Politics ==
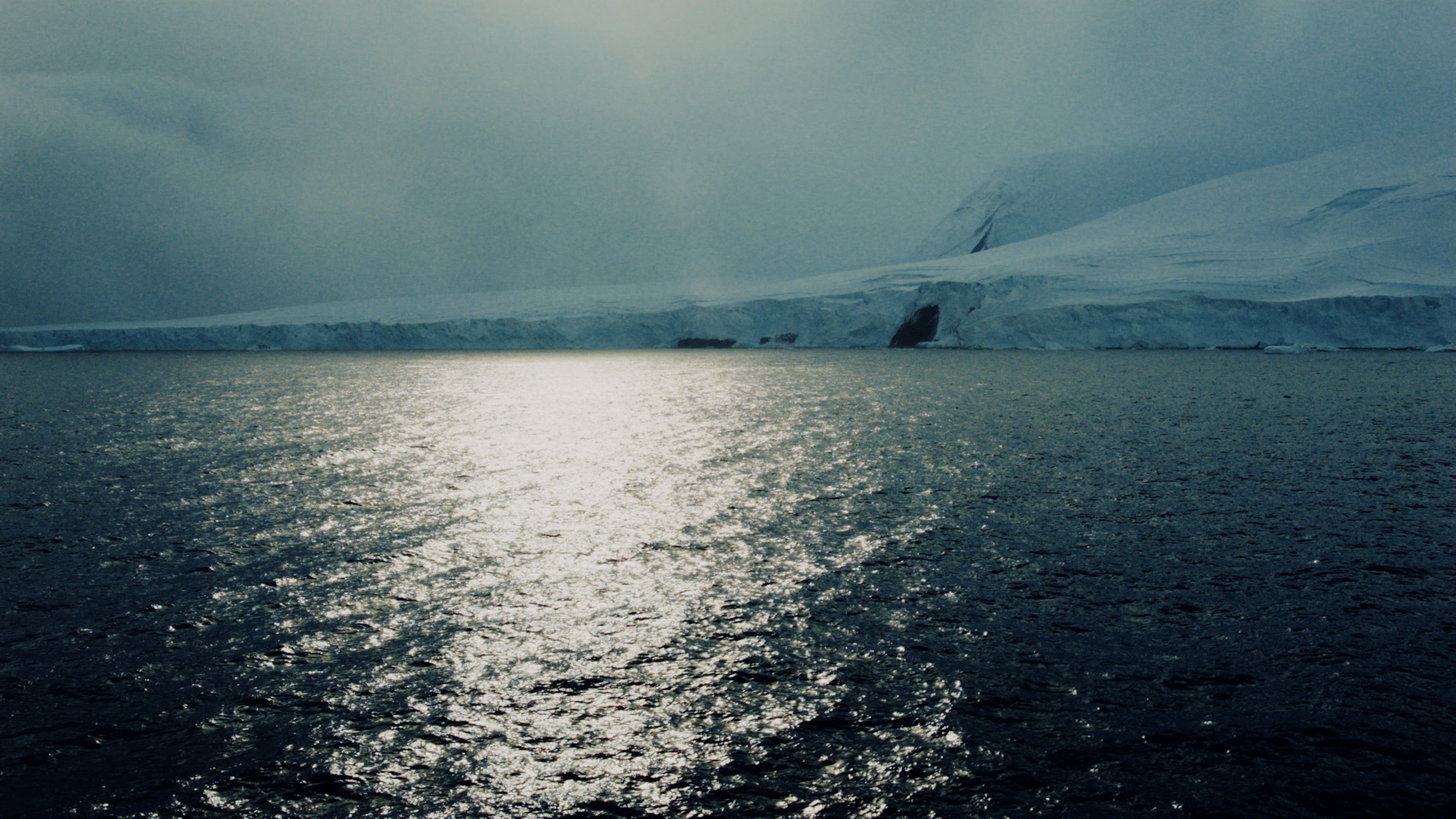
Coast of Peter I Island, 2017

Peter I Island is one of Norway's two territorial claims in Antarctica, the other being Queen Maud Land. Norway, Australia, France, New Zealand and the United Kingdom have all mutually recognized each other's claims in Antarctica. Other countries however, including the United States, do not recognize this claim. Peter I Island is the only claim within 90°W and 150°W and is also the only claim which is not a sector. Being south of 60°S, the island is subject to the Antarctic Treaty. The treaty ensures free access to the island for any scientific investigation, and states that it can be used only for peaceful purposes.

Norwegian administration of the island is handled by the Polar Affairs Department of the Ministry of Justice and Public Security, located in Oslo. The annexation of the island is regulated by the Dependency Act of 24 March 1933. It establishes that Norwegian criminal law, private law and procedural law applies to the island, in addition to other laws that explicitly state they are valid on the island. It further establishes that all land belongs to the state, and prohibits the storage and detonation of nuclear products.

Since 5 May 1995, Norwegian law has required all Norwegian activity in Antarctica, including on Peter I Island, to follow international environmental law for Antarctica. All Norwegian citizens who plan activities on Peter I Island must therefore report to the Norwegian Polar Institute, who may deny any non-conforming activity. All people visiting the island must follow laws regarding protection of nature, treatment of waste, pollution and insurance for search and rescue operations.

== See also ==
- List of Antarctic and subantarctic islands
- List of islands of Norway by area
- List of possessions of Norway
- List of volcanoes in Antarctica
- Ranvika, a cove on the eastern shore of the island.

== Bibliography ==
- Barr, Susan (1987). Norway's Polar Territories. Oslo: Aschehoug. ISBN 82-03-15689-4.
- Kyvik, Helga, ed. (2008). Norge i Antarktis. Oslo: Schibsted Forlag. ISBN 978-82-516-2589-0.
- LeMasurier, W. E.; Thomson, J. W., eds. (1990). Volcanoes of the Antarctic Plate and Southern Oceans. American Geophysical Union. ISBN 0-87590-172-7.
- Rubin, Jeff (2005). Antarctica. Lonely Planet. ISBN 1-74059-094-5.
