= Outline of Papua New Guinea =

Island nation in Oceania

The Flag of Papua New Guinea

The location of Papua New Guinea

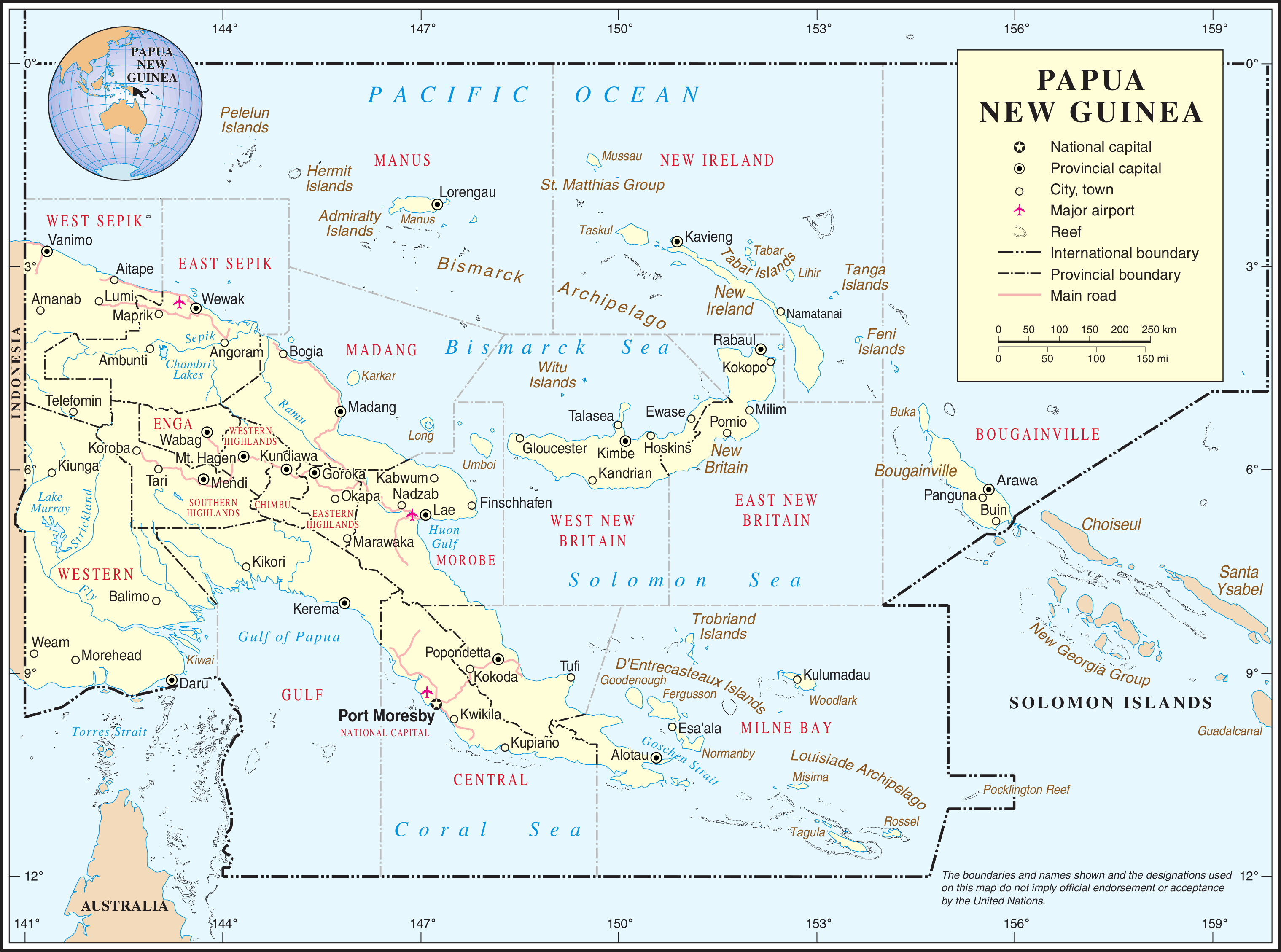
An enlargeable map of Papua New Guinea

The following outline is provided as an overview of and topical guide to Papua New Guinea:

Papua New Guinea is a sovereign island nation of Oceania comprising the eastern half of the Island of New Guinea (Note: The western portion of the Island of New Guinea is a part of Indonesian provinces of Papua and West Papua.) and numerous offshore islands in the western South Pacific Ocean. Papua New Guinea is located in a region defined since the early 19th century as Melanesia. Its capital, and one of its few major cities, is Port Moresby. It is one of the most diverse countries on Earth, with over 850 indigenous languages and at least as many traditional societies, out of a population of just under 6 million. It is also one of the most rural, with only 18 per cent of its people living in urban centres. The country is also one of the world's least explored, culturally and geographically, and many undiscovered species of plants and animals are thought to exist in the interior of Papua New Guinea.

The majority of the population live in traditional societies and practise subsistence-based agriculture. These societies and clans have some explicit acknowledgement within the nation's constitutional framework. The PNG Constitution (Preamble 5(4)) expresses the wish for traditional villages and communities to remain as viable units of Papua New Guinean society, and for active steps to be taken in their preservation. The PNG legislature has enacted various laws in which a type of tenure called "customary land title" is recognised, meaning that the traditional lands of the indigenous peoples have some legal basis to inalienable tenure. This customary land notionally covers most of the usable land in the country (some 97% of total land area); alienated land is either held privately under State Lease or is government land. Freehold Title (also known as fee simple) can only be held by Papua New Guinea citizens.

The country's geography is similarly diverse and, in places, extremely rugged. A spine of mountains runs the length of the island of New Guinea, forming a populous highlands region. Dense rainforests can be found in the lowland and coastal areas. This terrain has made it difficult for the country to develop transportation infrastructure. In some areas, planes are the only mode of transport. After being ruled by three external powers since 1884, Papua New Guinea gained its independence from Australia in 1975.

== General reference ==
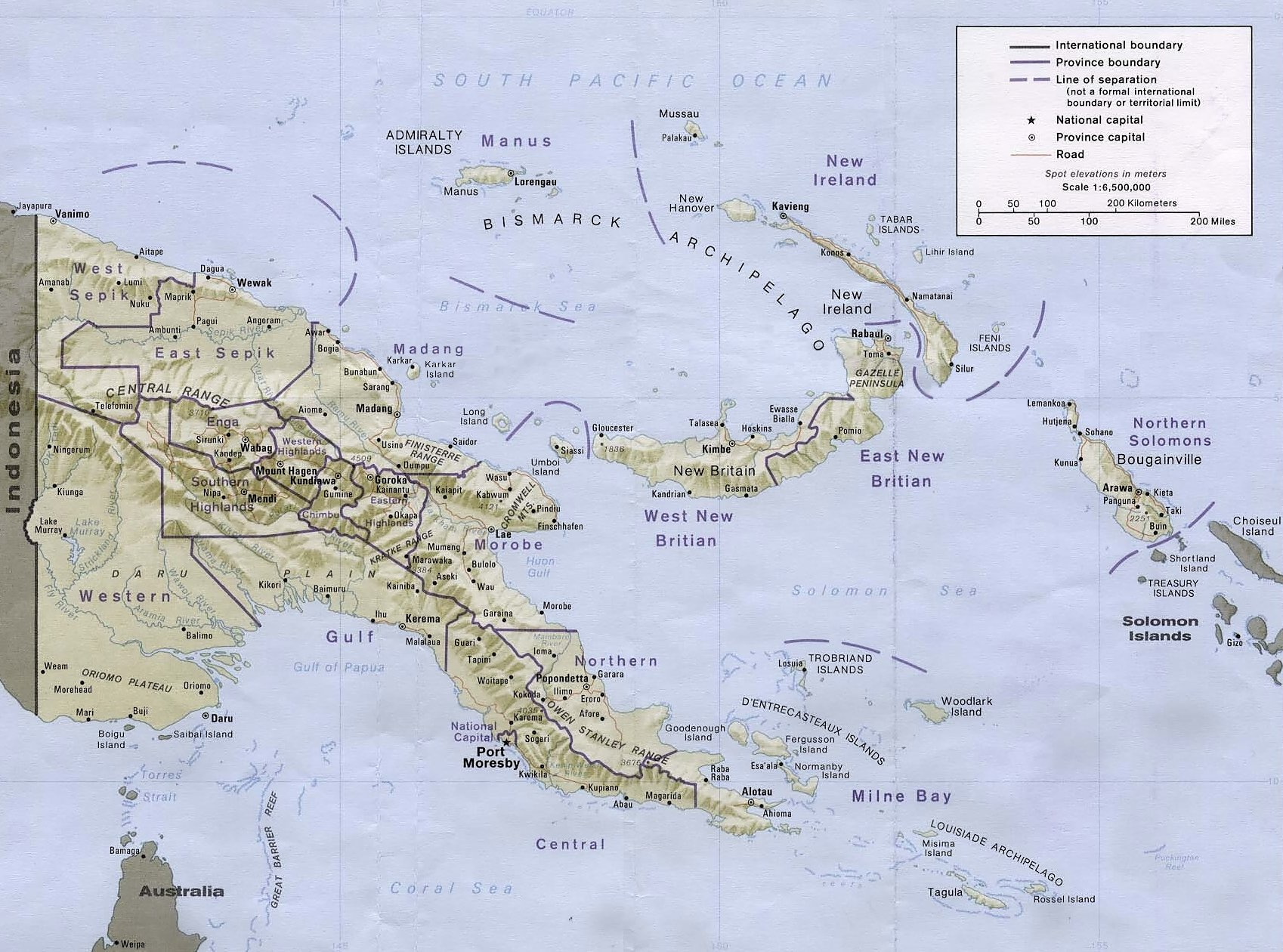
An enlargeable relief map of Papua New Guinea

- Pronunciation: /ˈpæpwə njuː ˈɡɪni/
- Common English country name: Papua New Guinea
- Official English country name: The Independent State of Papua New Guinea
- Adjectives: Papua New Guinean
- Demonym(s): Papua New Guinean
- Etymology: Name of Papua New Guinea
- International rankings of Papua New Guinea
- ISO country codes: PG, PNG, 598
- ISO region codes: See ISO 3166-2:PG
- Internet country code top-level domain: .pg

== Geography of Papua New Guinea ==
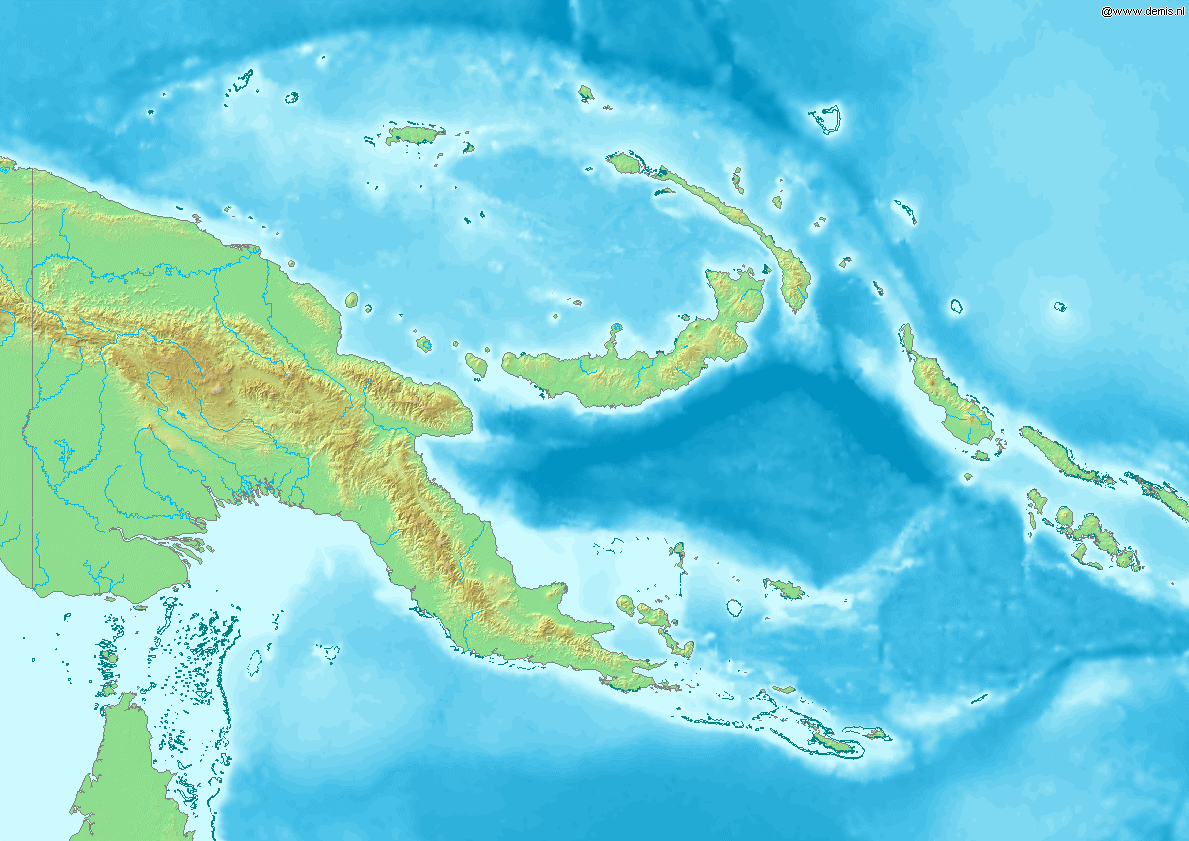
An enlargeable topographic/hydrographic map of Papua New Guinea

Geography of Papua New Guinea

- Papua New Guinea is...
  - a country (on an island)
    - a nation state
      - a Commonwealth realm
    - a megadiverse country
- Location:
  - Southern Hemisphere and Eastern Hemisphere
  - Pacific Ocean
    - South Pacific
      - Oceania
        - Melanesia
          - New Guinea (eastern half)
  - Time zone: UTC+10
  - Extreme points of Papua New Guinea
    - High: Mount Wilhelm 4,509 m (14,793 ft)
    - Low: Coral Sea and South Pacific Ocean 0 m
  - Land boundaries: Indonesia 820 km
  - Coastline: 5,152 km
- Population of Papua New Guinea: 6,331,000 – 82nd most populous country
- Area of Papua New Guinea: 245,857 km^{2}
- Atlas of Papua New Guinea

=== Environment of Papua New Guinea ===
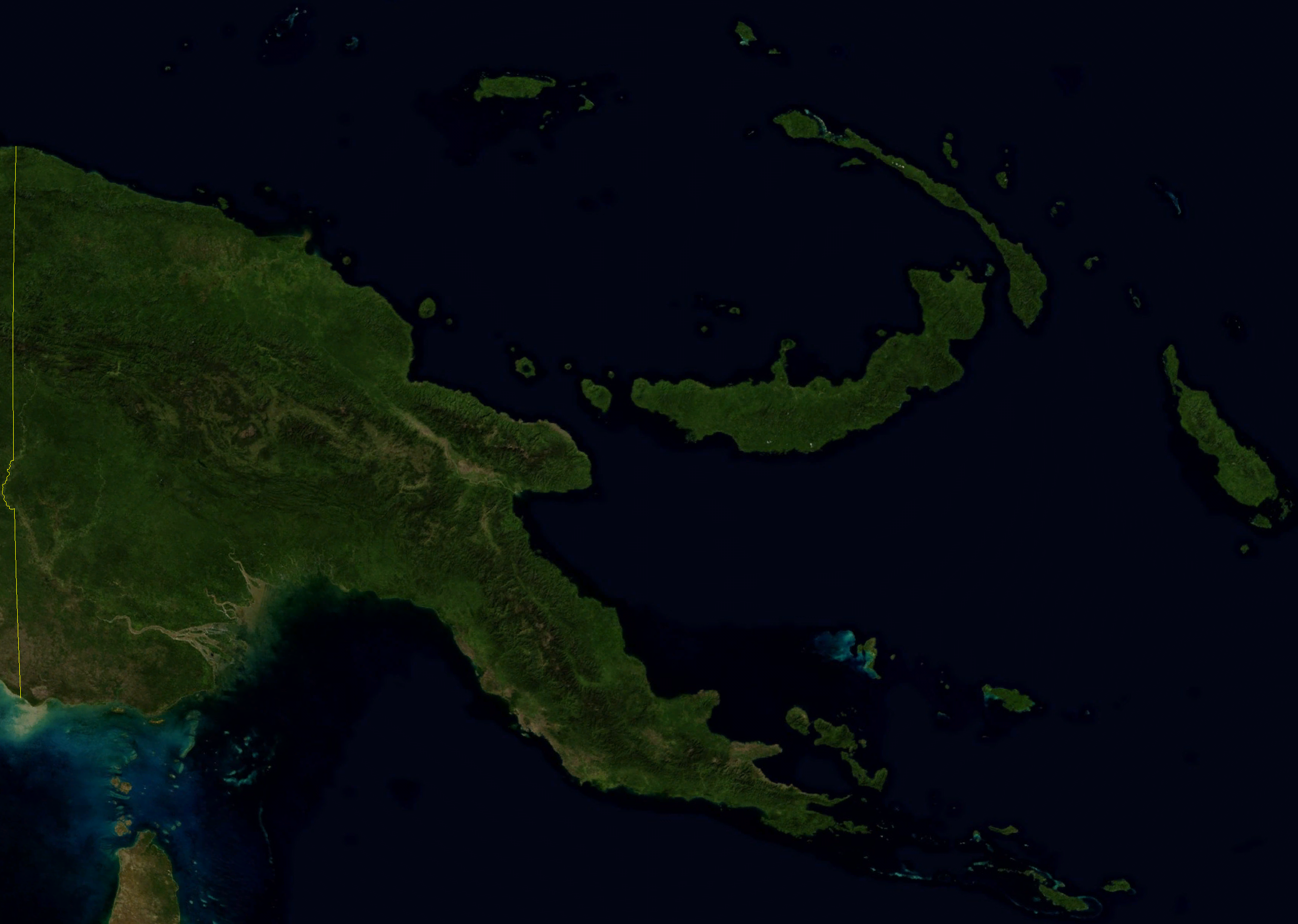
An enlargeable satellite image of Papua New Guinea

Environment of Papua New Guinea

- Climate of Papua New Guinea
- Environmental issues in Papua New Guinea
- Renewable energy in Papua New Guinea
- Geology of Papua New Guinea
- Protected areas of Papua New Guinea
  - Biosphere reserves in Papua New Guinea
  - National parks of Papua New Guinea
- Wildlife of Papua New Guinea
  - Fauna of Papua New Guinea
    - Butterflies of Papua New Guinea
    - Non-marine molluscs of Papua New Guinea
    - Fish of Papua New Guinea
    - Amphibians of Papua New Guinea
    - Reptiles of Papua New Guinea
    - Birds of Papua New Guinea
    - Mammals of Papua New Guinea

==== Natural geographic features of Papua New Guinea ====
- Islands of Papua New Guinea
- Lakes of Papua New Guinea
- Mountains of Papua New Guinea
  - Volcanoes in Papua New Guinea
- Rivers of Papua New Guinea
  - Waterfalls of Papua New Guinea
- Valleys of Papua New Guinea
- World Heritage Sites in Papua New Guinea
  - Kuk Early Agricultural Site

=== Regions of Papua New Guinea ===
Regions of Papua New Guinea

==== Ecoregions of Papua New Guinea ====
List of ecoregions in Papua New Guinea

- Ecoregions in Papua New Guinea

==== Administrative divisions of Papua New Guinea ====
Administrative divisions of Papua New Guinea

- Provinces of Papua New Guinea
  - Districts of Papua New Guinea
    - Local-level governments of Papua New Guinea
- Capital of Papua New Guinea: Port Moresby
- Cities of Papua New Guinea

=== Demography of Papua New Guinea ===
Demographics of Papua New Guinea

== Government and politics of Papua New Guinea ==
Politics of Papua New Guinea

- Form of government: parliamentary monarchy (Commonwealth realm)
- Capital of Papua New Guinea: Port Moresby
- Elections in Papua New Guinea
- Political parties in Papua New Guinea

=== Branches of the government of Papua New Guinea ===
Government of Papua New Guinea

==== Executive branch of the government of Papua New Guinea ====
- Head of state: King of Papua New Guinea, Charles III
  - Governor General of Papua New Guinea, the King's representative: Bob Dadae
- Head of government: Prime Minister of Papua New Guinea, James Marape
- Cabinet of Papua New Guinea

==== Legislative branch of the government of Papua New Guinea ====
- Parliament of Papua New Guinea (unicameral)

==== Judicial branch of the government of Papua New Guinea ====
Court system of Papua New Guinea

- Supreme Court of Papua New Guinea

=== Foreign relations of Papua New Guinea ===
Foreign relations of Papua New Guinea

- Diplomatic missions in Papua New Guinea
- Diplomatic missions of Papua New Guinea
- Australia-Papua New Guinea relations

==== International organization membership ====
The Independent State of Papua New Guinea is a member of:

- African, Caribbean, and Pacific Group of States (ACP)
- Asian Development Bank (ADB)
- Asia-Pacific Economic Cooperation (APEC)
- Association of Southeast Asian Nations (ASEAN) (observer)
- Association of Southeast Asian Nations Regional Forum (ARF)
- Colombo Plan (CP)
- Commonwealth of Nations
- Civil One (PNG) Ltd
- Food and Agriculture Organization (FAO)
- Group of 77 (G77)
- International Bank for Reconstruction and Development (IBRD)
- International Civil Aviation Organization (ICAO)
- International Criminal Police Organization (Interpol)
- International Development Association (IDA)
- International Federation of Red Cross and Red Crescent Societies (IFRCS)
- International Finance Corporation (IFC)
- International Fund for Agricultural Development (IFAD)
- International Hydrographic Organization (IHO)
- International Labour Organization (ILO)
- International Maritime Organization (IMO)
- International Monetary Fund (IMF)
- International Olympic Committee (IOC)
- International Organization for Migration (IOM) (observer)
- International Organization for Standardization (ISO) (correspondent)
- International Red Cross and Red Crescent Movement (ICRM)
- International Telecommunication Union (ITU)
- International Telecommunications Satellite Organization (ITSO)
- Inter-Parliamentary Union (IPU)
- Multilateral Investment Guarantee Agency (MIGA)
- Nonaligned Movement (NAM)
- Organisation for the Prohibition of Chemical Weapons (OPCW)
- Pacific Islands Forum (PIF)
- Secretariat of the Pacific Community (SPC)
- South Pacific Regional Trade and Economic Cooperation Agreement (Sparteca)
- United Nations (UN)
- United Nations Conference on Trade and Development (UNCTAD)
- United Nations Educational, Scientific, and Cultural Organization (UNESCO)
- United Nations Industrial Development Organization (UNIDO)
- Universal Postal Union (UPU)
- World Customs Organization (WCO)
- World Health Organization (WHO)
- World Intellectual Property Organization (WIPO)
- World Meteorological Organization (WMO)
- World Tourism Organization (UNWTO)
- World Trade Organization (WTO)

=== Law and order in Papua New Guinea ===
Law of Papua New Guinea

- Cannabis in Papua New Guinea
- Capital punishment in Papua New Guinea
- Law of Papua New Guinea
- Crime in Papua New Guinea
- Sexual violence in Papua New Guinea
- Human rights in Papua New Guinea
  - Abortion in Papua New Guinea
  - LGBT rights in Papua New Guinea
  - Freedom of religion in Papua New Guinea
- Law enforcement in Papua New Guinea

=== Military of Papua New Guinea ===
Military of Papua New Guinea

- Command
  - Commander-in-chief:
    - Ministry of Defence of Papua New Guinea
- Forces
  - Army of Papua New Guinea
  - Navy of Papua New Guinea
  - Air Force of Papua New Guinea
  - Special forces of Papua New Guinea
- Military history of Papua New Guinea
- Military ranks of Papua New Guinea

== History of Papua New Guinea ==
History of Papua New Guinea

- Timeline of the history of Papua New Guinea
- Current events of Papua New Guinea
- Military history of Papua New Guinea

== Culture of Papua New Guinea ==
Culture of Papua New Guinea

- Architecture of Papua New Guinea
- Cuisine of Papua New Guinea
- Festivals in Papua New Guinea
- Languages of Papua New Guinea
  - Papuan languages
- Media in Papua New Guinea
- National symbols of Papua New Guinea
  - Coat of arms of Papua New Guinea
  - Flag of Papua New Guinea
  - National anthem of Papua New Guinea
- People of Papua New Guinea
- Public holidays in Papua New Guinea
- Records of Papua New Guinea
- Religion in Papua New Guinea
  - Bahá'í Faith in Papua New Guinea
  - Christianity in Papua New Guinea
  - Hinduism in Papua New Guinea
  - Islam in Papua New Guinea
  - Judaism in Papua New Guinea
  - Sikhism in Papua New Guinea
- World Heritage Sites in Papua New Guinea

=== Art in Papua New Guinea ===
- Art in Papua New Guinea
- Cinema of Papua New Guinea
- Literature of Papua New Guinea
- Music of Papua New Guinea
- Television in Papua New Guinea
- Theatre in Papua New Guinea

=== Sports in Papua New Guinea ===
Sports in Papua New Guinea

- Football in Papua New Guinea
- Papua New Guinea at the Olympics

== Economy and infrastructure of Papua New Guinea ==
Economy of Papua New Guinea

- Economic rank, by nominal GDP (2007): 133rd (one hundred and thirty third)
- Agriculture in Papua New Guinea
- Banking in Papua New Guinea
  - National Bank of Papua New Guinea
- Communications in Papua New Guinea
  - Internet in Papua New Guinea
- Companies of Papua New Guinea
- Currency of Papua New Guinea: Kina
  - ISO 4217: PGK
- Energy in Papua New Guinea
  - Energy policy of Papua New Guinea
  - Oil industry in Papua New Guinea
- Mining in Papua New Guinea
- Tourism in Papua New Guinea
- Transport in Papua New Guinea
- Papua New Guinea Stock Exchange

== Education in Papua New Guinea ==
- Education in Papua New Guinea
  - List of schools in Papua New Guinea
- Papua New Guinea Academic and Research Network

== Infrastructure of Papua New Guinea ==
- Health care in Papua New Guinea
- Transportation in Papua New Guinea
  - Airports in Papua New Guinea
  - Rail transport in Papua New Guinea
  - Roads in Papua New Guinea
- Water supply and sanitation in Papua New Guinea

== See also ==
- Papua New Guinea
- List of international rankings
- Member states of the Commonwealth of Nations
- Member states of the United Nations
- Monarchy of Papua New Guinea
- Outline of Oceania
