= Television in Papua New Guinea =

Television was introduced into Papua New Guinea in 1987. Initially there were two channels, EM TV and NTN. NTN shut down after one year on air due to financial difficulties, leaving EM TV in a monopoly situation until 2008, when Kundu 2 opened. In 2014, Digicel opened TVWan.

== History ==
Television in Papua New Guinea was first suggested in 1964, when it was still an Australian territory, per a World Bank mission, with the initial aim of introducing an educational service for schools. A two-man commission for the development of television was set up in October 1965 by Professor Derek Broadbent and Douglas Brooke. It was expected that their findings were to be sent to Administrator Donald Cleland in January 1966.

The government of Papua New Guinea first considered having a television service in 1977. The initial plan suggested the creation of a national television service using satellite technology to cover the country by 1982, with battery-powered receivers sent to remote areas. The government rejected the idea of television the following year, under the principle that television would be "counterproductive to development". Shortly after the decision, Ikini Holloway of the National Broadcasting Corporation demanded that television should be introduced with different programming than initially suggested, but one of the three sub-committees was against the introduction of television. Even without television, video cassette recorders began to emerge in Papua New Guinea.

In 1981, two Australian expatriates created HiTRON, Papua New Guinea's first subscription television company. The company relayed television channels from satellites years before the creation of the first local television stations. This meant that only wealthy elites could access television; videotapes were the only other alternative. When the Parry Corporation, owners of NBN, decided to establish the Niugini Television Network in early 1984, the government finally legislated satellite television.

NTN, licensed in December 1984, was scheduled to open on 16 September 1985, but this was later delayed to 18 July 1986, and then 21 January 1987. The station broadcast on channel 7 in Port Moresby; EM TV opened on 23 July (Remembrance Day) on channel 9. EM TV was backed by the Nine Network, which it shared with local investors. Although it was originally meant to be a sort of Nine affiliate, foreign programming had to be negotiated directly with the producers and distributors due to licensing rules.

NTN faced financial difficulties in late 1987 and shut down on 15 March 1988. This left EM TV in a monopoly. That year, EM TV started expanding its terrestrial footprint and claimed an audience of 900,000 viewers nationwide.

On 16 September 2008, EM TV's monopoly was broken with the launch of the National Television Service, better known as Kundu 2 until 2015. It was renamed NBC Television in October of that year. On 14 November 2014, TVWan launched, coinciding with the launch of Digicel Play.

Digital terrestrial broadcasts began on 16 December 2024, using a grant from the Chinese government. The service launched with a 16-channel capacity with eight channels occupied and another eight vacant.

== Channels ==
Name	Owner	Launched
EM TV	Media Niugini Limited	23 July 1987
NBC TV	NBC PNG	18 September 2008
TVWan	Digicel	14 November 2014
