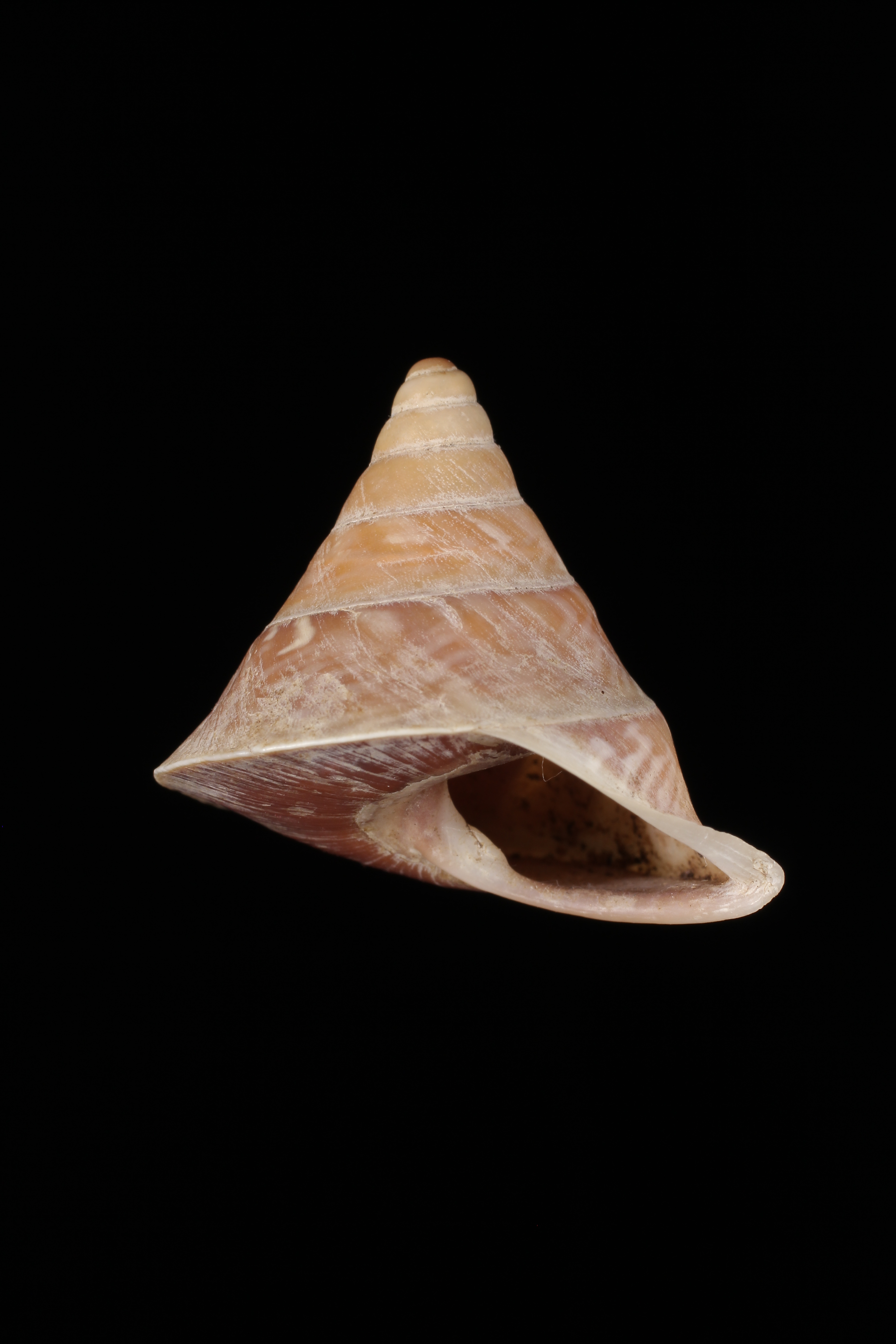
- Shell of Papuina johnabbasi (holotype at MNHN, Paris)

Scientific classification
- Kingdom: Animalia
- Phylum: Mollusca
- Class: Gastropoda
- Order: Stylommatophora
- Superfamily: Helicoidea
- Family: Camaenidae
- Subfamily: Hadrinae
- Genus: Papuina; Martens, 1860

Type species
- Helix lituus Lesson, 1831

Synonyms
- Carmerope Iredale, 1941; Eugenia Albers, 1860; Helix (Papuina) Martens, 1860; Insularia Tapparone Canefri, 1883; Merope E. von Martens, 1860; Molmerope Iredale, 1941; Municeps Iredale, 1941; Papuina (Municeps) Iredale, 1941· accepted, alternate representation; Papuina (Papuina) Martens, 1860; Papuina (Smeatonia) Iredale, 1941· accepted, alternate representation; Papuina (Solmodora) Iredale, 1943· accepted, alternate representation; Papuina (Solmogada) Iredale, 1941· accepted, alternate representation; Papuina (Solmopesta) Iredale, 1943· accepted, alternate representation; Papuina (Solmotella) Iredale, 1941· accepted, alternate representation; Papuina (Tepomusa) Iredale, 1941· accepted, alternate representation; Smeatonia Iredale, 1941; Solmodora Iredale, 1941; Solmopesta Iredale, 1941; Solmotella Iredale, 1941; Tepomusa Iredale, 1941; Zetemina Iredale, 1941

= Papuina =

Genus of gastropods

Papuina is a genus of air-breathing land snails, terrestrial pulmonate gastropod mollusks in the subfamily Hadrinae of the family Camaenidae.

== Description ==
(Original description in Latin) The shell is narrowly umbilicate, conical, and somewhat shiny. It is finely striated and banded. Comprising six convex whorls with the body whorl flattened at the base. The aperture is transversely subovate, and the columella is short and oblique. The peristome is expanded, reflexed, and angular, with the columellar margin semi-occulting the umbilicus.

== Species ==
Species within the genus Papuina include:

- Papuina abbasi Thach, 2016
- Papuina abbasiana Parsons, 2019
- Papuina acmella (Pfeiffer, 1860)
- Papuina acuta (Quoy & Gaimard, 1832)
- Papuina adonis (Angas, 1869)
- Papuina antiqua (A. Adams & Reeve, 1850)
- Papuina aurora Pfeiffer, 1862
- Papuina bartletti Cotton, 1941
- Papuina blainvillei (Le Guillou, 1842)
- Papuina blanfordiana (H.Adams, 1865)
- Papuina bougainvilliana I. Rensch, 1934
- Papuina brodiei (Brazier, 1872)
- Papuina caerulescens (Angas, 1870)
- Papuina canovarii (Tapparone-Canefri, 1883)
- Papuina christae Falconieri, 1996
- Papuina comriei (Angas, 1876) (species inquirendum)
- Papuina dampieri (Angas, 1869)
- Papuina donnaisabellae (Angas, 1869)
- Papuina eddystonensis (Reeve, 1854)
- Papuina eros (Angas, 1867)
- Papuina eyerdami I. Rensch, 1934
- Papuina exsultans (Tapparone-Canefri, 1883)
- Papuina fakfakensis Thach, 2020
- Papuina fallax Fulton, 1904
- Papuina flexilabris (Pfeiffer, 1856)
- Papuina franzhuberi Thach, 2018
- Papuina fringilla (Pfeiffer, 1855)
- Papuina gamelia (Angas, 1867)
- Papuina gelata (Cox, 1873)
- Papuina goldiei (Brazier, 1881)
- Papuina groulti (Dautzenberg, 1902)
- Papuina guadalcanarensis (Cox, 1871)
- Papuina gudei Vernhout, 1912
- Papuina guppyi (E. A. Smith, 1885)
- Papuina gurgustii (Cox, 1879)
- Papuina hargreavesi (Angas, 1869)
- Papuina hedleyi (E. A. Smith, 1892)
- Papuina hellwigensis Schepman, 1919
- Papuina hermione (Angas, 1869)
- Papuina hero (E.A.Smith, 1891) (species inquirendum)
- Papuina incerta I. Rensch, 1929
- Papuina jensi Falconieri, 1996
- Papuina johnabbasi Thach, 2020
- Papuina johnabbasiana Thach, 2020
- Papuina juttingae Mienis, 1993
- Papuina kapaurensis E. A. Smith, 1897
- Papuina labium (Ferussac, 1822)
- Papuina lacteolata japenensis Benthem-Jutting, 1965
- Papuina lanceolata (L. Pfeiffer, 1862)
- Papuina lepida Fulton, 1916
- Papuina leucorhaphe Möllendorff, 1899
- Papuina leucothoe (Pfeiffer, 1861)
- Papuina lienardiana (Crosse, 1864)
- Papuina linterae Möllendorff, 1897
- Papuina lituus (Lesson, 1831)
- Papuina lorentzi Schepman, 1919
- Papuina malantanensis (Adams & Angas, 1876)
- Papuina mayri (Rensch, 1934)
- Papuina mendana (Angas, 1867)
- Papuina mendoza (Brazier, 1872)
- Papuina meta (Pfeiffer, 1856)
- Papuina migratoria (Pfeiffer, 1855)
- Papuina molesta E.A.Smith, 1897 (taxon inquirendum)
- Papuina motacilla (L. Pfeiffer, 1855)
- Papuina mysolensis (Pfeiffer, 1862)
- Papuina nigrofasciata (Pfeiffer, 1864)
- Papuina nodifera (Pfeiffer, 1861)
- Papuina novoguineensis (Pfeiffer, 1862)
- Papuina obiensis (Dautzenberg, 1902)
- Papuina papuensis (Quoy & Gaimard, 1832)
- Papuina pelechystoma (Tapparone Canefri, 1880)
- Papuina phaecostoma (von Martens, 1877)
  - Papuina phaecostoma fulgurata Rolle, 1902
- Papuina philomela (Angas, 1872)
- Papuina pileolus (Férussac, 1821)
- Papuina pileus (Muller, 1774)
- Papuina piliscus (E. von Martens, 1898)
- Papuina plagiostoma (Pfeiffer, 1856)
- Papuina pseudolabium (Pfeiffer, 1868)
- Papuina pseudolanceolata Dautzenberg, 1903
- Papuina pseudosatsuma Möllendorff, 1902
- Papuina redempta (Cox, 1873)
- Papuina rhynchostoma (L. Pfeiffer, 1861)
- Papuina rianae Delsaerdt, 2012
- Papuina sachalensis (Pfeiffer, 1855)
- Papuina schafferyi Iredale, 1940
- Papuina smithi Boettger, 1919
- Papuina spectrum (Reeve, 1845)
  - Papuina spectrum wallaceana Sykes, 1903
- Papuina splendescens (Cox, 1865)
- Papuina stevenliei Thach, 2021
- Papuina steursiana (Pfeiffer, 1853)
  - Papuina steursiana concolor (E.A.Smith, 1897)
- Papuina subcostata Fulton, 1916
- Papuina suprapicta Fulton, 1905
  - Papuina tabarensis warreni Clench & Turner, 1964
- Papuina translucida (Quoy & Gaimard, 1832)
- Papuina trochiformis Preston, 1903 (taxon inquirendum)
- Papuina vexillaris (Pfeiffer, 1855)
- Papuina vitrea (A. Férussac, 1821)
- Papuina walleri Brazier, 1833
- Papuina weeksiana M. Smith, 1946
- Papuina wollastoni Robson, 1914

Species brought into synonymy

- Papuina admiralitatis (Rensch, 1931): synonym of Megalacron admiralitatis (I. Rensch, 1931) (original combination)
- Papuina albocarinata (E.A.Smith, 1887): synonym of Rhynchotrochus albocarinatus (E. A. Smith, 1887)
- Papuina alfredi (Cox, 1871): synonym of Megalacron alfredi (Cox, 1871) (superseded combination)
- Papuina ambrosia (Angas, 1867): synonym of Megalacron ambrosia (Angas, 1868)
- Papuina arrowensis (Le Guillou, 1842): synonym of Dendrotrochus arrowensis (Le Guillou, 1842)
- Papuina bequaerti (Clench & Turner, 1964): synonym of Megalacron bequaerti Clench & Turner, 1964
- Papuina boivini (Petit, 1841): synonym of Megalacron boivini (Petit de la Saussaye, 1841)
- Papuina brumeriensis (Forbes, 1852): synonym of Letitia brumeriensis (Forbes, 1851)
- Papuina buehleri (Rensch, 1933): synonym of Forcartia buehleri (Rensch, 1933)
- Papuina chancei (Cox, 1870): synonym of Papustyla chancei (Cox, 1870)
- Papuina cynthia (Fulton, 1902): synonym of Canefriula cynthia (Fulton, 1902) (original combination)
- Papuina globula (Rensch, 1930): synonym of Forcartia globula (I. Rensch, 1930) (original combination)
- Papuina hindei (Cox, 1888): synonym of Papustyla hindei (Cox, 1886)
- Papuina klaarwateri (Rensch, 1931): synonym of Megalacron klaarwateri (I. Rensch, 1931)
- Papuina kubaryi Möllendorf, 1895: synonym of Rhynchotrochus kubaryi (Möllendorff, 1895)
- Papuina lambei (Pfeiffer, 1856): synonym of Megalacron lambei (Pfeiffer, 1856)
  - Papuina lambei mahurensis Rehder, 1934: synonym of Megalacron tabarensis (I. Rensch, 1933)
  - Papuina lambei novohibernica M.Smith, 1946: synonym of Megalacron lambei (Pfeiffer, 1856)
- Papuina lilium (Fulton, 1905): synonym of Papustyla lilium (Fulton, 1905) (original combination)
- Papuina louisiadensis(Forbes, 1852): synonym of Rhynchotrochus louisiadensis (Forbes, 1852)
- Papuina lufensis Thiele, 1928: synonym of Megalacron lufensis (Thiele, 1928) (original combination)
- Papuina macgillivrayi (Forbes, 1852): synonym of Rhynchotrochus macgillivrayi (Forbes, 1852)
- Papuina melanesia (Clench & Turner, 1964): synonym of Megalacron melanesia Clench & Turner, 1964
- Papuina miser (Cox, 1873): synonym of Papuina meta (L. Pfeiffer, 1856)
- Papuina misima (Iredale, 1941): synonym of Rhynchotrochus misima (Iredale, 1941)
- Papuina naso (von Martens, 1894): synonym of Rhynchotrochus naso (von Martens, 1883)
- Papuina novaegeorgensis (Cox, 1870): synonym of Megalacron novaegeorgiensis (Cox, 1870)
- Papuina (Pinnadena) periwonensis Dell, 1955: synonym of Megalacron periwonensis (Dell, 1955)
- Papuina phaeostoma (Pfeiffer, 1877): synonym of Megalacron phaeostoma (Pfeiffer, 1877)
- Papuina pulcherrima Rensch, 1931: synonym of Papustyla pulcherrima (I. Rensch, 1931) (original combination)
- Papuina sellersi (Cox, 1872): synonym of Megalacron sellersi (Cox, 1872)
- Papuina spadicea Fulton, 1902: synonym of Megalacron spadicea (Fulton, 1902) (original combination)
  - Papuina spadicea dunkeri (Leschke, 1912): synonym of Megalacron spadicea (Fulton, 1902)
- Papuina strabo (Brazier, 1876): synonym of Rhynchotrochus strabo (Brazier, 1876)
- Papuina tabarensis Rensch, 1933: synonym of Megalacron tabarensis (I. Rensch, 1933) (original combination)
- Papuina tayloriana (Adams & Reeve, 1850): synonym of Rhynchotrochus taylorianus (A. Adams & Reeve, 1850) (unaccepted generic combination)
- Papuina tomasinelliana (Tapparone-Canefri, 1883): synonym of Canefriula tomasinelliana (Tapparone Canefri, 1883) (superseded combination)
- Papuina wiegmanni (Martens, 1894): synonym of Rhynchotrochus wiegmanni (Martens, 1894)
- Papuina woodlarkiana (Souverbie, 1863): synonym of Rhynchotrochus woodlarkianus (Souverbie, 1863)
- Papuina xanthochila (Pfeiffer, 1861): synonym of Papustyla xanthochila (Pfeiffer, 1861)
- Papuina yulensis (Brazier, 1876): synonym of Rhynchotrochus yulensis (Brazier, 1876)

== See also ==
- Emerald green snail
