= Capital punishment in Papua New Guinea =

Capital punishment is no longer a legal punishment in the Independent State of Papua New Guinea.

Capital punishment was abolished on 22 January 2022. It was legal under Australian colonial rule, but was abolished in 1970 in the leadup to independence. It was reinstated in 1991, but never used. The last execution was by hanging, in Port Moresby, in November 1954.

Within the Pacific Islands Forum, all countries (albeit not PNG) have either completely abolished capital punishment or have refrained from imposing it for numerous decades. The use of capital punishment in PNG has fluctuated throughout history and has again become unsettled in recent years.

== History ==
=== British New Guinea ===
British New Guinea was made a British protectorate in 1884 and became a Crown colony in 1888. Under the administration of William MacGregor, 11 legal executions of convicted murderers were carried out between 1889 and 1893. All executed individuals were natives and all but two of the victims where white. Executions were carried out by hanging, often at the scene of the crime, and typically witnessed by local residents and kinsmen of the condemned.

=== Territory of Papua ===
Following the transfer of British New Guinea to Australian control, acting administrator Christopher Robinson authorised two executions in the Northern Division in 1903. The policy of Hubert Murray, who was lieutenant-governor of the newly constituted Territory of Papua for over 30 years, varied significantly in the first decade and the remaining years of his administration. Murray authorised four executions early in his tenure and another in 1914. Nine others were hanged in 1915 and 1916, either for the murders of white men or Papuan members of the Royal Papuan Constabulary.

Under the Papua Act 1905, the Australian government could not directly overrule the lieutenant-governor's decision to carry out a death sentence, although in 1930 the Scullin government influenced Murray to grant a reprieve in line with its general opposition to capital punishment. Stephen Gorambaru was hanged in 1934 for offences under the White Women's Protection Ordinance, after being convicted of raping a five-year-old white girl. The last execution under Murray's tenure occurred in 1938 when Karo Araua was publicly hanged in Port Moresby for murdering the gaoler at Badili and the gaoler's wife and daughter.

=== Territory of New Guinea ===
During the Australian occupation of German New Guinea, military administrator Samuel Pethebridge authorised subordinate officers to carry out summary executions of any New Guineans they deemed guilty of murder. At least three such executions were carried out by firing squad, including that of Kaipaith, an alleged "cannibal chief", in 1915. Pethebridge subsequently reversed his orders and required all sentences of death to be confirmed by the administrator. According to the British Administration of German New Guinea Government Gazette, 25 New Guineans were legally executed between 1918 and 1921, while many others were killed without trial in punitive expeditions.

Under the civilian administration of the Territory of New Guinea, legally a League of Nations mandate after 1920, public executions were used as a "tool of government". In 1933, a district officer reported that two executions in New Britain had been carried out before crowds of hundreds of people, and that "execution of the murderers on the spot has done much to make these natives fall in with the wishes of the government". Around 65 executions were carried out between 1921 and the Japanese occupation of New Guinea in 1942.

Following the Japanese occupation, 22 New Guinean civilians convicted of collaboration offences – members of the Orokaiva people – were publicly executed by the Australian New Guinea Administrative Unit (ANGAU) in 1943 and 1944. The hangings were intended as a deterrent against other prospective collaborationists, with the offenders "hung two at a time from early in the morning until late in the afternoon in front of thousands of local people".

=== Post-independence ===
Since 1954, PNG appeared to have maintained a strong "long-standing de facto moratorium" which was later passed into law. The complete abolishment of capital punishment occurred in 1970 whilst PNG was still under the colonial administration of Australia. However, in 1973, PNG took the first step towards becoming independent and began the process of self-governance. Two years later in 1975, Australia gave up its remaining powers over PNG, allowing the country to proceed to complete independence.

In August 1991, the Government of PNG re-introduced capital punishment as an amendment to the PNG Criminal Code Act 1974. At this point its application was limited to cases of wilful murder, but the imposition of the death penalty would not be mandatory and therefore be "at the discretion of the Judge." The re-introduction of capital punishment into legislation was greeted with a mixed response not only in PNG but throughout the world. The Government at the time justified its actions by arguing that it was aligning legislation to reflect public perception that there was a necessity to deter abhorrent behaviour. According to Bernard Narokobi (the Justice Minister at the time), "it reflected the community's outrage and disgust" at heinous criminal offences. Despite his support for Papua New Guinean communities to express their views, Narokobi made it clear that he did not endorse the move towards the re-introduction of capital punishment. However, the country's Prime Minister at the time, Rabbie Namaliu, argued that the alarming deterioration in the country's enforcement of law and order was a threat to the country's future and needed to be dealt with. On the contrary, there was also strong opposition for the re-introduction of capital punishment. Amnesty International pleaded that PNG addressed the deterioration of law and order in other ways and declared that Amnesty International "opposed the death penalty in all cases on the grounds that it is a violation of the human right to life."

In 2010, Manfred Nowak undertook a comprehensive review of PNG's use of "torture and other cruel, inhuman or degrading treatment or punishment" and subsequently recommended that PNG took immediate steps to abolish the death penalty. Following this, Nowak also suggested that PNG become party to the International Covenant on Civil and Political Rights (the ICCPR) and ratify the second optional protocol, aimed at abolishing the death penalty worldwide.

However, in May 2013 PNG took further steps to revive the use of capital punishment, simultaneously amending legislation to reflect harsher punishments for a variety of criminal offences. Due to the failed deterrence of criminal offences following the 1991 Criminal Code amendment, the government subsequently passed another amendment to the Criminal Code. Under earlier versions of the PNG Criminal Code, offences of treason, piracy and attempted piracy were also punishable by death. In addition, the 2013 amendment allowed that aggravated rape and robbery, alongside wilful murder would be punishable by death. Concurrently, the Government repealed the Sorcery Act 1971 therefore making sorcery-related murder also punishable by death. The Prime Minister (former) Peter O'Neill stated "the proposed laws are tough, but they are necessary. We have to address a situation which is destroying our country." The amendments came into force on 18 September 2013.

== Recent events ==
In 2014, it was indicated that the state was moving to use capital punishment since its reintroduction in 1991 and widening in 2013. The Constitutional Law Reform Commission discussed capital punishment in a public forum which was held in 11/2014, following the report given to the government on preferred methods.

On 5 February 2015, the Secretary of the Department of Justice and Attorney General, Lawrence Kalinoe, indicated that there were 13 people on death row. All had exhausted their appeals and were set to be executed that year. Kalinoe also confirmed that the government had "approved an interagency committee to oversee the implementation of capital punishment." A new facility was planned at Bomana Prison in Port Moresby to carry out the executions of the prisoners.

On 12 January 2022, Prime Minister James Marape announced plans to abolish capital punishment. The Capital Punishment Act was repealed on 20 January 2022, and all sentenced prisoners had their death sentences commuted to life imprisonment.

== Cases ==
=== Charles Bougapa Ombusu ===
On 20 February 1995, Charles Bougapa Ombusu was the first person to be sentenced to death after PNG's re-introduction of capital punishment in 1991, following his supposed "fatal shooting of the father of a girl he had raped" in Popondetta, Northern Province. Ombusu was later acquitted in April 1995. The Supreme Court found that Ombusu had acted in self-defence. Critics of capital punishment have raised concerns that this form of punishment risks executing innocent people. Since 1995, other death sentences have been handed down, but no executions have been carried out due to an absence of regulations surrounding the appropriate process.

=== Steven Loke Ume ===
On 2 December 1995, the three appellants were among a group of nine who had abducted and brutally killed a woman. The trial judge deemed the facts of the case to accord with the worst kind of wilful murder and thus sentenced each of the appellants to death. The issue in the case on appeal was whether or not the trial judge had erred in reaching the conclusion of imposing the death sentence. The question was essentially whether or not there were "extenuating circumstances or mitigating factors which warranted lesser punishment" than the death penalty. The PNG Supreme Court quashed the death sentences imposed on each appellant and concluded that without further guidance from legislation, "Parliament may wish to consider prescribing the types of aggravating circumstances in wilful murder cases which warrant the death penalty." Or further, clarify when "extenuating circumstances" are relevant. Finally, the PNG Supreme Court concluded with situations in which the imposition of the death penalty would be more appropriate;

1. The killing of a child, a young or old person, or a person under some disability needing protection;
2. The killing of a person in authority or responsibility in the community providing invaluable community service, whether for free or for fee who are killed in the course of carrying out their duties or for reasons to do with the performance of their duties e.g. policeman, correctional officer, government officer, school teacher, church worker, company director or manager:
3. The killing of a leader in government or the community, for political reasons;
4. The killing of person in the course of committing other crimes perpetrated on the victim or other persons such as rape, robbery or theft;
5. The killing for hire;
6. The killing of two or more persons in the single act or series of acts;
7. For an offence committed by a prisoner in detention or custody serving sentence for another serious offence of violence; or
8. The prisoner has prior conviction(s) for murder offences.

Applying this case, prosecutors are to determine whether the death penalty is the appropriate sentence in light of the facts and circumstances of the particular case.

== Methods ==
The primary method of capital punishment was hanging. While precise statistics of all cases are unknown, it is known that "at least 67 people were executed by hanging" under the colonial administration of Australia, the United Kingdom, and Germany between World War I and World War II.

Following the 2013 amendment of the Criminal Code, the government introduced lethal injection, gas inhalation, firing squad, and electrocution, in addition to hanging. With the addition of the four alternative methods, the commission was required to report the best and most appropriate method. The commission travelled to the United States, Malaysia, Indonesia, Thailand and Singapore "in order to provide advice to the government on what methods of execution should be adopted".

Following the report by the commission, the Cabinet endorsed hanging, firing squad, and lethal injection as appropriate methods. One of these three methods would have been used if an offence punishable by death had been committed and a sentence of death had been imposed.

== Exceptions ==
There were three situations in which a sentence of capital punishment would have been rejected: minors at the time the offence was committed; pregnant women; and mentally ill persons.

=== Juveniles ===
If a person under the age of 18 committed a criminal offence that was punishable by death, they would not have been executed. PNG ratified the ICCPR and the Convention on the Rights of the Child (CRC), both of which are international instruments that prohibit the execution of a person under 18.

=== Pregnant women ===
Pregnant women would not have been executed during or after pregnancy for the crime sentenced for.

=== Mentally ill persons ===
A person with the incapacity to understand or control their actions would not have been liable for a criminal offence they committed. Also, persons who committed offences due to delusions would have only been "held liable insofar as the delusion would support criminal liability if it were true."

== Legal framework ==
The state is governed by a mixture of national and international legislation.

=== National ===
PNG had two notable pieces of legislation concerning capital punishment. The Criminal Code Act 1974 and the Constitution of the Independent State of Papua New Guinea (Constitution) were at the front of the law. Imposing capital punishment for murder in PNG was prescribed in section 299(2) of the Criminal Code Act 1974 and was validated by the country's constitution. The right to life provision stated "no person shall be deprived of his life intentionally except ... in execution of a sentence of a court following his conviction of an offence for which the penalty of death is prescribed by law". The provision concerning the freedom from inhuman treatment confirmed that the killing of a person under section 35(1)(a) did not contravene section 36(1).

=== International ===
The ICCPR and the CRC are fundamental human rights documents which the state is party to. On 21 July 2008, PNG ratified the ICCPR. However, it is not party to the Second Optional Protocol to the International Covenant on Civil and Political Rights which is aimed at abolishing capital punishment. In the same year, it abstained from the vote on the UN moratorium on the death penalty and went on to oppose a similar notion in 2011. The state signed the CRC on 30 September 1990 and ratified it on 2 March 1993.

== See also ==
- Human rights in Papua New Guinea
- Right to life
- Outline of Papua New Guinea

== Sources ==
- Chisholm, Murray (2024). Capital Punishment, Clemency and Colonialism in Papua New Guinea, 1954–1965. ANU Press. ISBN 9781760466466.
- Inglis, Amirah (1975). The White Women's Protection Ordinance: Sexual Anxiety and Politics in Papua. Sussex University Press. ISBN 0856210498.
- Nelson, Hank (1978). "The Swinging Index: Capital Punishment and British and Australian Administrations in Papua and New Guinea, 1888-1945". The Journal of Pacific History. 13 (3): 130–152.
