= Meri Toksave =

- Founded: 2013
- Founders: Ayesha Lutschini; Tasman Bain; Courtney Price
- Type: Charity and NGO
- Purpose: Violence against women Gender-based violence Sexual violence Gender equality Women's rights Human rights Youth empowerment Gender and development Community development
- Location(s): Brisbane, Australia and Port Moresby, Papua New Guinea
- Region served: Papua New Guinea
- Volunteers: 10 (2014)
- Website: meritoksavedotorg.wordpress.com

Meri Toksave is a youth-led, non-profit, non-governmental organisation that designs and delivers programmes and partnerships for the promotion and protection of human rights, the empowerment of women and girls, the advancement of gender equality, and the prevention and elimination of domestic, sexual and gender-based violence in Papua New Guinea.

== Background ==
Meri Toksave was founded in early 2013 by University of Queensland students Ayesha Lutschini, Tasman Bain and Courtney Price. They subsequently were awarded a Fellowship with The Resolution Project at the Harvard World Model United Nations in March 2013.

Location of Papua New Guinea

Meri Toksave is Tok Pisin loosely translated into English as information for women.

Sexual violence in Papua New Guinea is endemic, with two-thirds of all women having been subject to abuse or violence. Human rights in Papua New Guinea also has a troubled record, with women still being discriminated against in many communities.

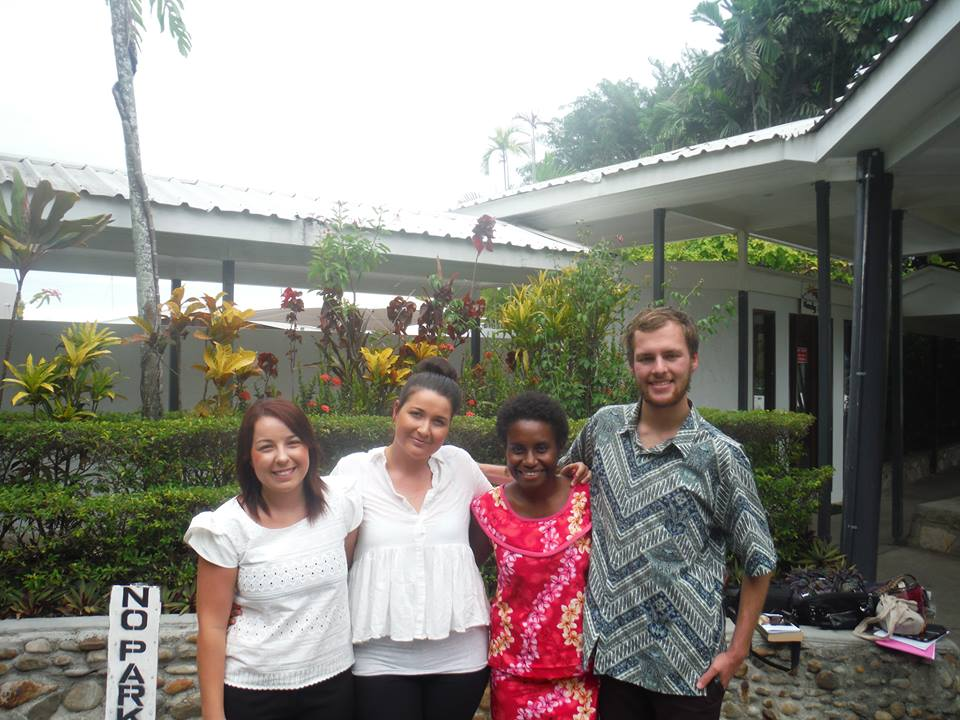
The Co-Founders of Meri Toksave in Port Moresby

== Activities ==
=== 2013 ===
The first project of Meri Toksave was to research, collate and verify the Meri Toksave Directory, the first ever country-wide directory of emergency and support services for survivors of gender-based violence in Papua New Guinea. The directory has been distributed to a range of service providers throughout Papua New Guinea with which Meri Toksave has developed partnerships, including UN Women, Oxfam, World Vision, Anglicare, Port Moresby General Hospital, the Papua New Guinea Department of Education, Médecins Sans Frontières, Soroptimist, Marie Stopes, ChildFund, United States Agency for International Development, Australian Department of Foreign Affairs and Trade, and other local and international organisations in the private and public sectors.

In September 2013, Ayesha Lutschini was invited to speak at the United Nations Association of Australia International Day of the Girl Child Forum. Also in September, Meri Toksave was granted observer status with the International NGO Development Council of Papua New Guinea when the team visited Port Moresby.

Ayesha Lutschini was a finalist for The Australian Women's Weekly 2013 Women of the Future Scholarship for her work with Meri Toksave and was also a finalist for the UnitingCare Australia 2014 Anti-Poverty Awards.

=== 2014 ===
In March 2014, Meri Toksave was invited to attend the Papua New Guinea Women's Forum hosted by the United States Department of State. The top four recommendations of the Papua New Guinea Women's Forum included references to Meri Toksave and the Meri Toksave Directory to be utilised to "Launch a Nation-wide Campaign Against Gender Based Violence" and to "develop and carry out a nation-wide public and media messaging campaign against gender based violence (GBV) and create a practical tool that can improve coordination and service delivery for GBV services." Meri Toksave was also featured in the Papua New Guinea Women's Directory formulated by the United States Department of State.

The Australian Institute of International Affairs invited Meri Toksave to present at the Young Professional Network NGO Information Evening in October 2014. Ayesha Lutschini was also invited to attend the Queensland Premier’s Special Task Force on Domestic and Family Violence Summit chaired by Dame Quentin Bryce. Also in October 2014, Meri Toksave was one of the featured organisations with an installation at the Resolution Project's annual gala, Resolve, hosted in the Harvard Club of New York. In December, Ayesha Lutschini was a panelist and panel moderator for the FHI 360 Gender Learning Forum in Mt Hagan in the highlands of Papua New Guinea.

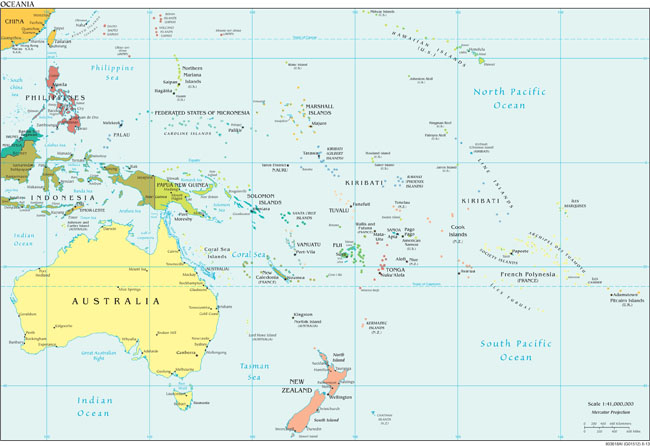
The Region of Oceania

=== 2015 ===
In March, Ayesha Lutschini attended the United States Department of State 2015 Papua New Guinea Women's Forum. Also in March, Courtney Price was a presenter at the UN Youth Australia Queensland State Conference. For the University of Queensland Union 2015 Social Justice Week, Tasman Bain was invited to join a panel discussion on the progress for women's rights in the Millennium Development Goals. In May, Tasman Bain also delivered a presentation on Meri Toksave and the role of young people in social justice to the Queensland Youth Parliament.

In June 2015, Ayesha Lutschini was a keynote speaker for the Oxfam Australia Gender Empowerment Speaker Night alongside Oxfam Australia CEO Helen Szoke. Also in June, Ayesha Lutschini and Tasman Bain were panelists for the closing session of the International Feminist Journal of Politics Conference hosted at the Women's College of the University of Queensland. In July, Tasman Bain delivered a keynote presentation on Meri Toksave at the Bond University Social Justice Dinner. In August, Tasman Bain was a speaker at the Australian National University for a panel on the role of men in gender equity and also a speaker at the University of Queensland Feminist Fortnight panel discussion on men in feminism. Tasman Bain was recognised as a Queensland State Finalist for the Young Australian of the Year Award in September 2016. In October, Meri Toksave was a featured initiative at the Resolution Project's Advisory Board meeting and in the opening remarks of the Resolution Project Resolve Gala. In November, Ayesha Lutschini was appointed a Member of the Board of Directors of the One Woman Project.

=== 2016 ===
Since early 2016, Meri Toksave has been a featured organisation by Pacific Women in Business, an initiative funded by Westpac Pacific and the Australian Aid Program to support and connect women business leaders and entrepreneurs across the Pacific Islands. The Meri Toksave Directory has also been featured by the Oil Search Foundation as a key resource.

In May 2016, Tasman Bain was invited by the Queensland Premier to attend the Queensland End Domestic and Family Violence Design Forum to formulate innovative communication strategies for domestic and family violence prevention as per the recommendations of the "Not Now, Not Ever: Putting an End to Domestic and Family Violence in Queensland" report.

In June, Ayesha Lutschini was appointed a Member of the Board of Directors of the Coalition for Change PNG, a leading community-based organisation for the elimination of domestic and family violence in Papua New Guinea. Also in June, Somerville House senior student leaders organised a fundraising evening for Meri Toksave.

=== 2017 ===
In March 2017, Meri Toksave was selected as one of 50 featured initiative in the inaugural Youth Solutions Report of the United Nations Sustainable Development Solutions Network showcasing youth-led solutions for the Sustainable Development Goals.

In April 2017, Meri Toksave was profiled by Feminist Foreign Policy.

In October 2017, Tasman Bain delivered a seminar on cross-sectoral programming for the elimination of gender-based violence at the Global Ideas Forum at the University of Melbourne.

=== 2018 ===
In February 2018, Meri Toksave contributed to the Youth Sector Consultation Final Statement for the Australian Voluntary National Review on Agenda 2030 and the Sustainable Development Goals by the Department of Foreign Affairs and Trade.

=== United Nations ===
Meri Toksave is a member of the United Nations Global Partnership for Youth in the Post-2015 Development Agenda founded and chaired by the United Nations Office of the Secretary-General's Envoy on Youth, is an official partner of the United Nations My World Global Survey, and is a Member of the United Nations Sustainable Development Solutions Youth Network. Also, through the Resolution Project, Meri Toksave has access to United Nations Department of Public Information NGO Youth Representative Status.

== See also ==
- UN Women
- Human rights in Papua New Guinea
- Sexual violence in Papua New Guinea
