= Communications in Papua New Guinea =

Communications in Papua New Guinea refers to the media in the country which are regulated by the Media Council of Papua New Guinea such as newspapers, radio, television, and the Internet.

== Newspapers ==
Papua New Guinea has two circulating newspapers:

- The National, and the
- Papua New Guinea Post-Courier.

== Radio ==
Radio broadcasting in Papua New Guinea was launched on 25 October 1935 by the Australian Broadcasting Commission (ABC). It was replaced by the National Broadcasting Commission which was formed under the Broadcasting Commission Act of 1973 (authority of Parliament). The commission was renamed as the National Broadcasting Corporation in 1994:

- The state-run National Broadcasting Corporation operates three radio networks with multiple repeaters and about 20 provincial stations (2009).
- Several commercial radio stations with multiple transmission points as well as several community stations (2009).
- Transmissions of several international broadcasters are accessible (2009).
- Radios: 410,000 (1997).

== Television ==
- Three free-to-air television networks, limited to larger population centres or areas where mine sites, or local community groups have decided to redistribute the signal:
  - EM TV - commercial, owned by Fiji Television, started in 1987 but bought off by Telikom PNG in 2014
  - NBC TV - state owned, started in 2008
  - TV Wan - digital free-to-view channel, started in 2014
- Satellite and cable TV services are available through Digicel Play PNG and Click TV PNG, who owns both satellite and terrestrial services in PNG. MMDS subscription television is available through Hitron Digital.

== Telephone ==
- Papua New Guinea's international country code is 675.
- Telephone lines: 139,000 fixed lines in use, 140th in the world (2012); 63,000 main lines in use (2005).
- Mobile lines: 2.7 million lines, 134th in the world (2012); 75,000 lines (2005).
- Telephone system: services are minimal; facilities provide radiotelephone and telegraph, coastal radio, aeronautical radio, and international radio communication services. Domestic access to telephone services is not widely available although combined fixed-line and mobile-cellular teledensity has increased to roughly 40 per 100 persons as of 2009.
- Satellite earth station: Intelsat (Pacific Ocean).
- Submarine cable: the APNG-2 submarine communications cable links Papua New Guinea directly to Australia and indirectly to New Zealand and the rest of the world. A collaboration between Telikom PNG, Telstra (Australia), and Telecom New Zealand, it has been in service since late 2006. It replaced the APNG-1 cable, a coaxial copper cable of 16 Mbit/s, which was retired in 2006.

== Internet ==
- Country code (Top level domain): .pg. Papua New Guinea University of Technology is the registrar.
- Internet users: 145,256 users, 163 in the world; 2.3% of the population, 198th in the world (2012).
- Fixed broadband: 8,077 subscriptions, 153rd in the world; 0.1% of the population, 164th in the world (2012).
- Mobile broadband: unknown (2012).
- Internet hosts: 5,006 hosts, 145th in the world (2012).
- IPv4: 49,920 addresses allocated, 7.9 per 1000 people.
- Internet service providers: Four in 2004, up from two in 1999.

=== Censorship ===
There are no government restrictions on access to the Internet or credible reports that the government monitors e-mail or Internet chat rooms without judicial oversight. Individuals and groups engage in the expression of views via the Internet, including by e-mail.

The constitution provides for freedom of speech and press, and the government generally respects these rights in practice. Newspapers offer a variety of editorial viewpoints and report on controversial topics. There is no evidence of officially sanctioned government censorship, although newspaper editors complained of intimidation tactics aimed at influencing coverage. There were some examples of police officers targeting journalists who negatively covered police activities. Although the constitution prohibits arbitrary interference with privacy, family, home, or correspondence, there are instances of abuse.

== See also ==
- Media Council of Papua New Guinea
