= National Television Service =

Television channel in Papua New Guinea

The National Television Service (NTS) is a free-to-air state-owned television channel launched in September 2008 in Papua New Guinea. Originally, it was known as Kundu 2 (after the drum) and competes against EM TV, owned by Media Niugini Limited (Telikom PNG), which was the country's only free-to-air television service until 2008. Since 2015, the channel broadcasts at a national scale under the name NBC Television.

== History ==
The National Broadcasting Corporation was interested in opening a television channel as early as 1978, offering an educational line-up, but one of the three sub-committees was against the introduction of television. Subsequently, television began in 1987 when two television stations opened subsequently in Port Moresby (NTN and EM TV). NTN lasted little more than a year when financial constraints caused by the US stock market crash late in 1987, while EM TV took advantage of the situation and formed a monopoly for 20 years.

In 2008, Peter Aitsi of Transparency International PNG and owner of radio stations in the country, said that there was already a market for two national channels. The channel started broadcasting on 16 September 2008, during the 33rd Independence Day of Papua New Guinea. At launch, NTS broadcast for two hours every evening. Its programmes include news, documentaries and other educational programmes. The network initially ran in some built up areas of PNG but remote areas and minor centres still could not find the station.

As of 2009, Kundu 2 is on air in Port Moresby, Lae, Wewak, Madang, Rabaul, Goroka and Mount Hagen. The National Broadcasting Corporation of Papua New Guinea is expanding the stations broadcast footprint to eventually cover all areas of the country. Kundu 2 is beginning another period of growth as it comes to the end of its first year of existence.

Kundu 2 currently provides a live telecast of the PNGRFL (BeMobile Cup) and made history with the first instant replay of local sports coverage in PNG's history, on 21 June 2009.

On 1 June 2010, NBC appointed Joe Wafewa as its executive director; he was acting director with the channel since launch in 2008. On 17 July 2010, Kundu 2 launched in Aitape, twelve years after the tsunami.. On 6 June 2012, it launched in Pangia.

In July 2013, NBC announced a plan to roll-out NBC at a national scale, pending government approval of a submission. Nine million kina were granted for installing infrastructure. It carried the entirety of the 2014 FIFA World Cup in cooperation with Australian rights holder SBS.

Wheels of Change first aired on Kundu 2 in July 2013 and focuses on people with disabilities. Initially, the programme only focused on such people in Port Moresby, but announced an expansion for the 2015 series to cater other cities.

In October 2015, Kundu 2 was renamed NBC Television. In March 2016, NBC TV launched on Click TV, reaching rural areas. Sign language was added to the news in late 2016, costing 20,000 kina. The channel was available free to all DigicelPLAY users even without a subscription, but became a subscription-only channel in late 2019.

At 6pm on 16 December 2024, NBC started digital terrestrial broadcasts. In January 2026, it was awarded the exclusive right to broadcast the Betfred Super League, and sublicensed rights to New Zealand and Pacific territories.
