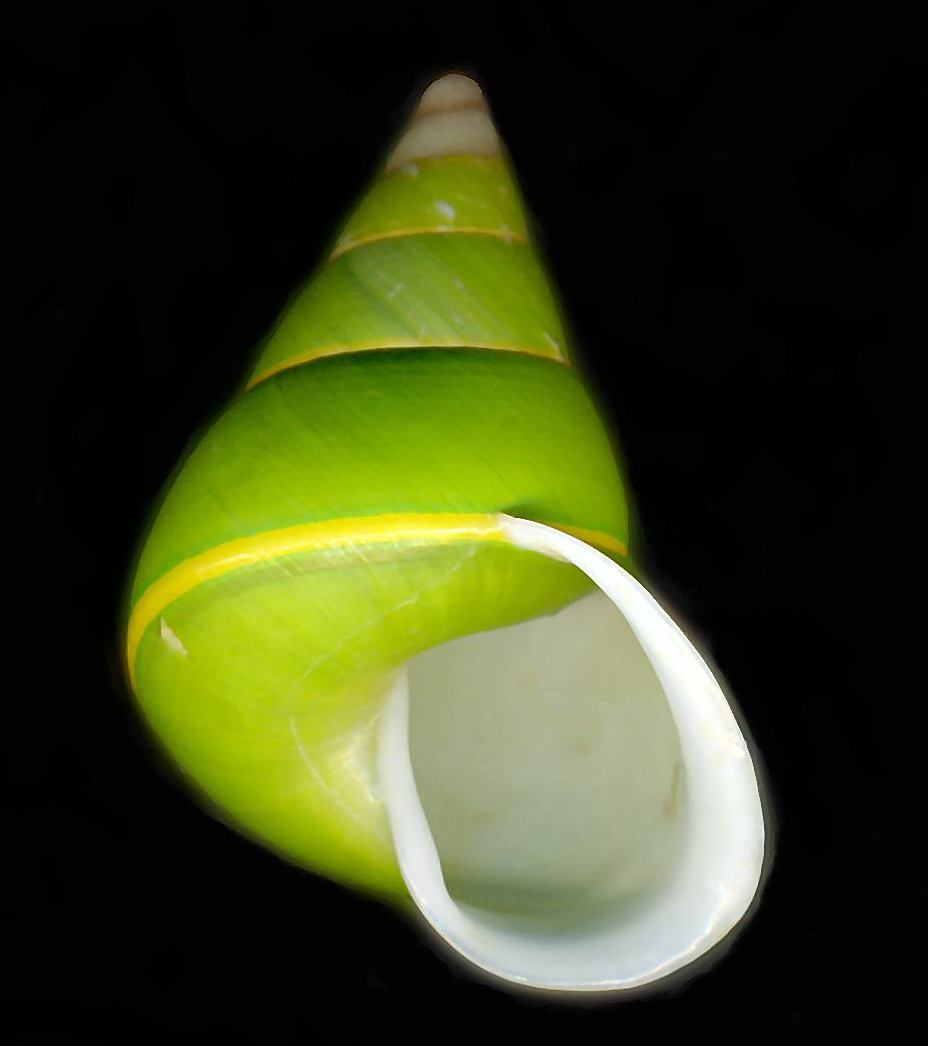
- Apertural view of a shell of Papustyla pulcherrima

Scientific classification
- Kingdom: Animalia
- Phylum: Mollusca
- Class: Gastropoda
- Order: Stylommatophora
- Superfamily: Helicoidea
- Family: Camaenidae
- Subfamily: Hadrinae
- Genus: Papustyla; Pilsbry, 1893

Type species
- Cochlostyla hindei Cox, 1886

Synonyms
- Hombronula Iredale, 1941; Papuina (Papustyla) Pilsbry, 1893

= Papustyla =

Genus of gastropods

Papustyla is a genus of air-breathing land snails, terrestrial pulmonate gastropod mollusks in the subfamily Hadrinae of the family Camaenidae.

== Species ==
This genus contains the following species:

- Papustyla chancei (Cox, 1870) Chance's Papustyla.
- Papustyla chapmani (Cox 1870), Chapman's Papustyla.
- Papustyla fergusoni (H. Adams, 1872) Ferguson's Papustyla.
- Papustyla hindei (Cox, 1886)
- Papustyla lilium (Fulton, 1905) Lily-white Papustyla.
- Papustyla novaepommeraniae (I. Rensch & B. Rensch, 1929) New Pommeran Papustyla.
- Papustyla pulcherrima (I. Rensch, 1931) Emerald green snail.
- Papustyla xanthochila (Pfeiffer, 1861) Golden mouth Papustyla.

Species brought into synonymy

- Papustyla horderi (G. B. Sowerby III, 1890): synonym of Papuina antiqua horderi (G. B. Sowerby III, 1890)(superseded combination)
