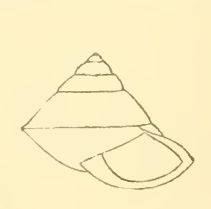
- Original image of a shell of Papuina trochiformis

Scientific classification
- Kingdom: Animalia
- Phylum: Mollusca
- Class: Gastropoda
- Order: Stylommatophora
- Family: Camaenidae
- Genus: Papuina
- Species: P. trochiformis

Binomial name
- Papuina trochiformis H.B. Preston, 1903

= Papuina trochiformis =

Species of gastropod

Papuina trochiformis is a species of air-breathing land snail, a terrestrial pulmonate gastropod mollusk in the family Camaenidae.

== Distribution ==
The type locality for this species is described as Mafor Island, New Guinea.

== Shell description ==
The height of the shell attains 19 mm, its maximum diameter is 23 mm, minimum diameter 19 mm; aperture: diameter 9 mm, height 9 mm.

(Original description) The conical shell has an acute spire. It contains 5-6 whorls The last is sharply keeled, the upper whorls show a much greater convexity in proportion than the last two. The suture is shallow. The aperture is oblique, having a distinct callosity, presenting a somewhat heliciniform appearance, The peristome is expanded and reflexed. The columella is stout, with a protuberance at its base. The umbilicus is very narrow, partly concealed by reflexion of the lip. The shell is striated with somewhat coarse growth lines, otherwise it is destitute of sculpture. The colourof the shell is pale whitish yellow, deepening on earlier whorls.
