= Media Council of Papua New Guinea =

The Media Council of Papua New Guinea (MCPNG) was established in 1985 and is a body responsible for the development of media and the regulator of media services in Papua New Guinea (PNG).

The MCPNG’s purpose is to provide innovative solutions to strengthening the media in PNG. It is also responsible for enhancing the capacity of the media, and acting as a “watch-dog, agenda-setter and gate-keeper”. The MCPNG hopes to create a “free, pluralistic and vibrant media” that contributes to the democratic governance debate in the country.

== Programmes ==
The MCPNG advances its goals through two programmes – the Media for Development Initiative (MDI) and the Development Communication Initiative (DCI). The MDI is focused on the advancement of media in PNG and the DCI is responsible for engaging civil society in the communication of development information across the country.

AusAID reports that the MDI contributed “to improved stability, governance and service provision by supporting an open and democratic media that delivers quality information services to all areas of PNG.” Working with the National Broadcasting Corporation and the Media Council, the MDI strengthens the capacity and the operations of the media in PNG, particularly in the rural areas.

This approach is based on the principle that an accessible and effective media can:

- Increase the voices of the poor and marginalised in public policy
- Support civic education, peace-building and promotion of culture
- Foster civil society networks
- Provide access to development information and complement basic services delivery, for example through agricultural extension radio programs and broadcasts on the availability of health clinics.

The MDI is run by Justin Kili, a veteran journalist who has spent time working for the British Broadcasting Corporation. He is known as “the voice of PNG”.

== Initiatives ==
In a presentation to the OECD, the Media Council listed several initiatives that it has led in line with its goals. They are:

- A radio and newspaper campaign started to fight corruption that developed into a pledge from all local media houses to donate A$150,000 to promote governance, transparency and decency;
- A campaign during the 2002 national elections that encouraged voters to vote for good leadership, change and ousting corruption;
- The establishment of an independent media standard committee;
- Establishment of an editor’s task force on corruption; and
- Sections in print and electronic media on promoting good governance.

== Supporters ==
The MCPNG lists its main supporters as AusAID and the embassy of the People’s Republic of China.

AusAID contributes up to A$500 million to the programme per year. Between 2003 and 2008, AusAID contributed A$13.9 million specifically to the MDI.

== Misallocation of funds ==
In June 2011, AusAID suspended its donations to the MCPNG after a routine audit found anecdotal evidence of fraud. The audit found that funds “had not been managed in accordance with procurement guidelines” and that several thousand dollars were missing.

An executive director of MCPNG, Nimo Kama, was suspended following the revelation. Kama was formerly the MCPNG’s chief executive before being appointed as vice president of the Pacific Islands News Association (PINA), a body providing representation to media professionals across 23 Pacific Islands. Kama replaced the former vice president, John Woods, who resigned over disagreements with the PINA board’s stance on the constitutional crisis in Fiji.

== See also ==
- Communications in Papua New Guinea
