= Sexual violence in Papua New Guinea =

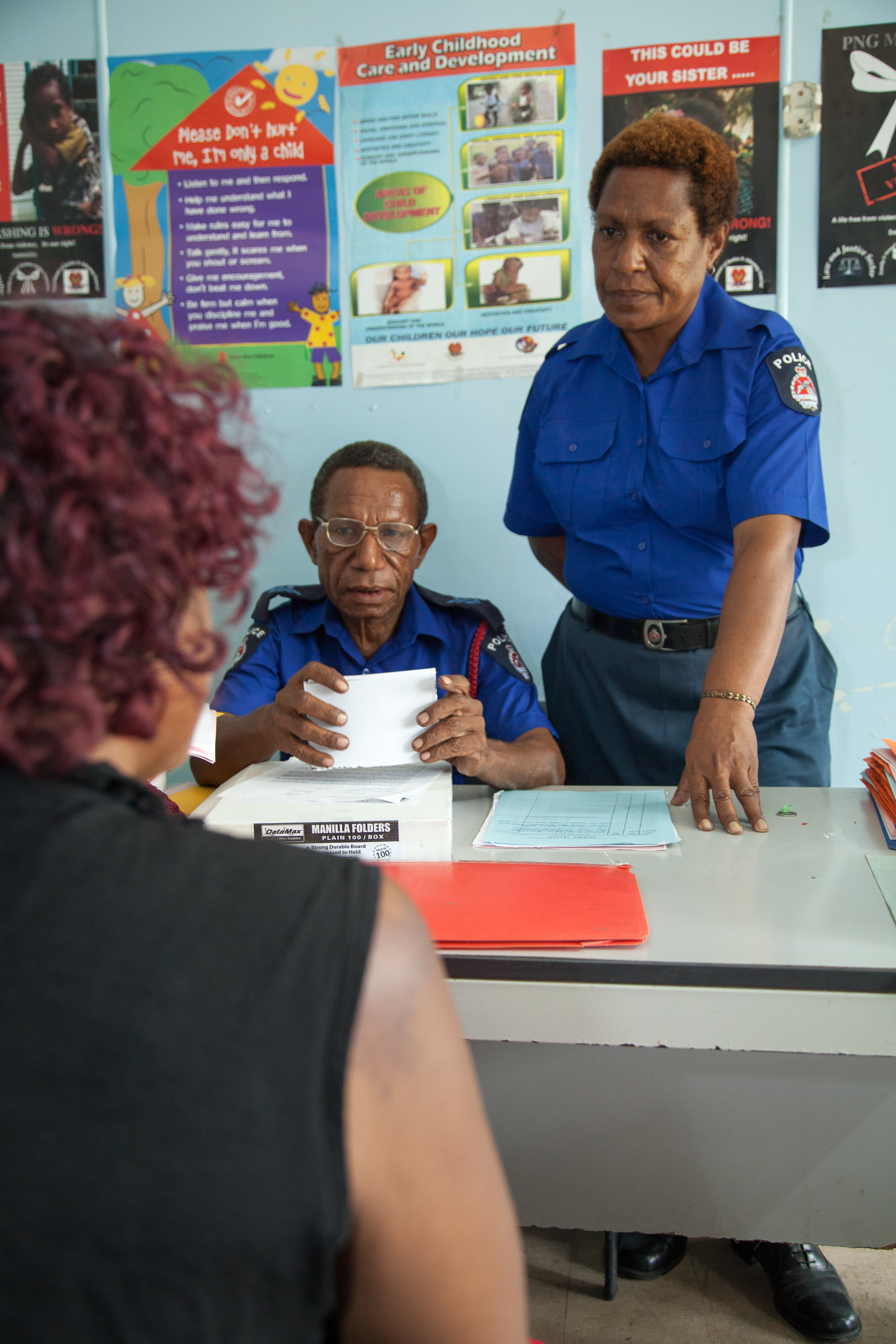
A client at the Family and Sexual Violence Unit at Waigani Police Station speaks to police officers about a case.

Papua New Guinea (PNG) is often labelled as potentially the worst place in the world for gender-based violence. Domestic violence and rape are common and rarely adequately addressed.

== Types ==
=== Violence against women ===
According to a 1992 survey by the PNG Law Reform Commission, an estimated 67% of wives have been beaten by their husbands with close to 100% in the Highlands Region. In urban areas, one in six women interviewed needed treatment for injuries caused by their husbands. The most common forms of violence include kicking, punching, burning and cutting with knives, accounting for 80–90% of the injuries treated by health workers.

According to a 1993 Survey by the PNG Medical Research Institute, an estimated 55% of women have experienced forced sex, in most cases by men known to them. Abortion in Papua New Guinea is illegal unless it is necessary to save the woman's life, so those who experience pregnancy from rape have no legal way of terminating forced pregnancies.

=== Violence against infants, children and adolescents ===
UNICEF describes the children in Papua New Guinea as some of the most vulnerable in the world. According to a 2008 UNICEF report, nearly half of reported rape victims are under 15 years of age and 13% are under seven, while a 2013 report by ChildFund Australia citing former Parliamentarian Dame Carol Kidu claimed 50% of those seeking medical help after rape are under 16, 25% are under 12 and 10% are under eight. Up to 50 percent of girls are at risk of becoming involved in sex work, or being internally trafficked. Many are forced into marriage from 12 years of age under customary law. One in three sex workers are under 20 years of age.

==== Sexual initiation rites ====
Initiation rites of prepubescent boys as young as seven among groups in the highlands of New Guinea involved sexual acts with older males. Fellatio and semen ingestion were found among the Sambia, the Baruya and Etoro. Among the Kaluli people, this involved anal sex to deliver semen to the boy. These rites often revolve around beliefs that women represent a cosmic disorder. The Sambia abandoned the practice, while the other groups practiced potentially till at least the early 80s.

=== Violence against men ===
A 2013 study found that 7.7% of men have sexually assaulted another male.

== Perpetrators ==
=== Statistics ===
A 2013 study by Rachel Jewkes and colleagues, on behalf of the United Nations Multi-country Cross-sectional Study on Men and Violence research team, found that 41% of men on Bougainville Island admit to coercing a non-partner into sex, and 59% admit to having sex with their partner when she was unwilling. According to this study, about 14.1% of men have committed multiple perpetrator rape. In a survey in 1994 by the PNG Institute of Medical Research, approximately 60% of men interviewed reported to have participated in gang rape (known as lainap) at least once.

=== Urban gangs ===
In urban areas, particularly slum areas, Raskol gangs often require raping women for initiation reasons. Peter Moses, one of the leaders of the "Dirty Dons 585" Raskol gang, stated that raping women was a "must" for the young members of the gang. In rural areas, when a boy wants to become a man, he may go to an enemy village and kill a pig to be accepted as an adult, while in the cities "women have replaced pigs". Moses, who claimed to have raped more than 30 women himself, said, "And it is better if a boy kills her afterwards, there will be less problems with the police".

== See also ==
- Meri Toksave
