= Papua New Guinea Academic and Research Network =

Nonprofit organisation

The Papua New Guinea Academic and Research Network (PNGARNET) is a nonprofit organisation owned and operated by the Papua New Guinea Vice-Chancellors Committee. PNGARNET's stated mission is to expand the availability of cost-effective Internet services to the nation's universities and research centres.

== History ==
Efforts to develop cost-effective Internet connectivity between Papua New Guinea’s higher education institutions began in the mid-1990s. In 2006, discussions between the nation’s telecommunications providers, universities and government resulted in the decision to create a single entity that would address the issue.

PNGARNET was launched in April 2008, and its initial membership consisted of four state-funded schools – University of Goroka, University of Papua New Guinea, University of Technology and Vudal University – plus the privately owned Divine Word University and Pacific Adventist University and two government agencies, the National Research Institute and the National Agricultural Research Institute.

== Internet connectivity ==
Among PNGARNET’s earliest projects has been the development of a computer satellite virtual local area network designed to increase Internet bandwidth to the nation's higher education institutions. The first installation coordinated by PNGARNET was a 3.7 metre satellite dish at the University of Goroka, which was designed to replace an older and slower dish while enabling the facility to facilitate full Internet research and communications services across Papua New Guinea and in connection with other nations.

Papua New Guinea’s topography, with its rugged landforms and seismic activity, discouraged the installation of optical fibre as the main telecommunications medium for Internet connectivity. A microwave transmission was not pursued, since the technology requires line-of-sight between towers, which could only be constructed and maintained by PNG Telikom. Therefore, it was decided to use satellite transmission for PNGARNET’s connectivity.

The PNGARNet system is made up of the participating institutions and a hub that is located in Hong Kong. The Hong Kong location was chosen due to the guarantee of uninterrupted electrical power and Internet connectivity and for its access to technology experts and supplies. PNGARNet rents its bandwidth on a geo-stationary orbiting satellite.

== Funding ==
The institutions participating in PNGARNET are required to purchase and maintain their on-site equipment, and each institution is charged a fee to help defray the costs of the Hong Kong hub. Internet bandwidth needs are paid on a predetermined scale that is reviewed annually.
