= Emerald green snail =

- A shell of Papustyla pulcherrima

Conservation status
- Near Threatened (IUCN 3.1)
- CITES Appendix II (CITES)

Scientific classification
- Kingdom: Animalia
- Phylum: Mollusca
- Class: Gastropoda
- Order: Stylommatophora
- Family: Camaenidae
- Genus: Papustyla
- Species: P. pulcherrima

Binomial name
- Papustyla pulcherrima Rensch, 1931

Synonyms
- Papuina pulcherrima

Species of gastropod

The emerald green snail, green tree snail, or Manus green tree snail, scientific name Papustyla pulcherrima, sometimes listed as Papuina pulcherrima, is a species of large, air-breathing tree snail, a terrestrial pulmonate gastropod mollusk in the family Camaenidae.

The shells of this species were in demand for making jewelry, and were popular with shell collectors and, partly as a result of this, the species is now near being threatened.

== Distribution and habitat ==
P. pulcherrima is endemic to Manus Island in Papua New Guinea. This snail lives in trees, and inhabits rain forest areas up to 112 m (367 ft) above sea level.

== Description ==
The shell of this species is a vivid green color, which is unusual in snails. The green color is however not within the solid, calcium carbonate part of the shell but instead it is a very thin protein layer known as the periostracum. Under the periostracum the shell is yellow.

== Endangered ==
Overharvesting of the species for commercial purposes led to a decline in the population of this snail. Logging of the rain forest where this species lives is also a serious threat to its survival.

The snail and its shell are protected under CITES (Convention on International Trade in Endangered Species of Wild Fauna and Flora) and the species is listed in the IUCN Red List as near threatened as of 2015.

Papustyla pulcherrima is the only foreign gastropod species that is listed as Federally Endangered in the United States since 3 June 1970.
