= Juvenile justice in Papua New Guinea =

Papua New Guinea (PNG) has a population of 6.8 million, nearly half of which is under 18 years of age. Public trust in the justice system has been eroded, and the country’s significant crime problem exacerbated, by brutal responses from police against those they suspect of having committed offences, and the routine violence, abuse and rape carried out by police against persons, including children, within their custody. Many incidents are cases of opportunistic abuses of power by police instead of their following official processes. While a raft of measures have been assembled in order to improve conditions and processes for youths within the justice system, their success has been hampered by a severe lack of implementation, insufficient resources, and failure to impose appropriate penalties on authorities for failure to adhere to their provisions.

== International legal obligations ==
The Convention Against Torture (CAT) and the International Covenant on Civil and Political Rights (ICCPR) work to prohibit torture and cruel, inhuman, or degrading treatment and punishment. Many abuses that children in PNG have been subjected to amount to "torture" which is defined in CAT to mean any act where severe pain or suffering, (physical or mental), is inflicted by a state official or with their consent or acquiescence, for a purpose such as obtaining a confession or information, punishment, intimidation or coercion. PNG ratified the ICCPR in 2008 but has not yet ratified the CAT, however the prohibition against such treatment is widely regarded to have attained the status of a jus cogens norm meaning that it is a binding norm of customary international law from which states are not permitted to derogate.

Pursuant to the United Nations Convention on the Rights of the Child, which PNG ratified in 1993, a child has a right to protection from "all forms of physical or mental violence, injury or abuse, neglect or negligent treatment, maltreatment or exploitation including sexual abuse, while in the care of parent(s), legal guardian(s) or any other person who has the care of the child." Article 37 prohibits the subjection of children to "torture or other cruel, inhuman or degrading treatment or punishment". It further states that arrest, detention or imprisonment of children should only be used as a last resort for the shortest appropriate time, that children should be separated from adults, and that children deprived of their liberty must have the right to prompt access to legal assistance.

== Juvenile justice reforms ==
In response to concerns regarding the handling of young offenders in PNG, the Juvenile Courts Act 1991 (JCA) was enacted, entering into force in 2003, and representing PNG’s endeavour to incorporate the Convention on the Rights of the Child into its domestic criminal justice system. Through the JCA, PNG became the first country in the Pacific to establish a distinct justice system for juvenile offenders, a juvenile being "a person aged not less than seven years and less than 18 years".

Free legal assistance for juveniles is only obtainable from the Office of the Public Solicitor where they face serious charges or seek to appeal a custodial sentence. However, the JCA provides for the appointment of juvenile court officers (JCO) who, pursuant to section 13 of the JCA should have the power to enter places where children are detained, including police lockups; interview children; be present during interrogation; advise children of their rights; question arresting officers; attend court; and make submissions regarding sentence. Anyone obstructing a JCO from exercising their powers commits an offence under the JCA. In practice their role has largely proved ineffective on account of their insufficient training; lack of legitimacy from the perspective of police and correctional institution staff who regularly refuse them access to juveniles; deficient financial resources for expenses incurred in performing their duties (such as travel); and inadequate supervision of JCOs following training.

The Juvenile Courts established under the JCA have jurisdiction for all indictable offences except homicide, rape or offences punishable by death or imprisonment; the more serious charges will come before National Court Judges. Juvenile Magistrates and Judges are guided by the Juvenile Court Protocol which requires them to "monitor the use of physical force used against a juvenile" and to exclude any evidence obtained by use of threats or torture pursuant to both domestic and international standards. The Juvenile Court Protocol, prohibits Magistrates from placing children in institutions that lack a separate juvenile section, and directs them to review police decisions with regard to detention. Magistrates are provided a checklist so that they may ensure that any arrest or detention of juveniles is carried out in compliance with the JCA and the Protocol. However, Human Rights Watch (HRW) has found that Magistrates and Judges were not asking children about their physical treatment, even in cases where they were obviously injured, and often ignored reports of violence volunteered by children.

The 2004 Administrative Review of the Police recommended reform with regard to accountability, enforcement of disciplinary codes, reform of task forces, mobile squads and auxiliary police, and an improvement of police response to cases of domestic violence and sexual abuse. The Police Juvenile Justice Policy and Diversity Protocol was drafted in February 2006 with the aim of realigning police practices and procedures with JCA provisions and ensuring that the interests of juveniles are the primary consideration. In accordance with these procedures, arrest and detention of juveniles are only to be used in extreme or special circumstances, and their identity and records are to be kept strictly confidential. The Protocol places emphasis on restorative justice and diversion with a view to diverting those who commit less serious offences away from the formal justice processes.

== Problems with implementation of reforms ==
=== Police violence ===
Violence within PNG’s police force is endemic and the vulnerability of children, and the assumption that most young males are "raskols" (members of criminal gangs), render children particularly easy targets. During his visit to PNG in 2010 the UN Special Rapporteur on Torture received numerous complaints of beatings and ill-treatment of juveniles whose allegations were corroborated by medical evidence. In interviews conducted by HRW, children reported such abuses as being kicked, beaten with crowbars, batons, rubber hoses, and chairs, as well as being shot or knifed, with the pain and suffering often inflicted in order to obtain confessions to crimes or to punish them for things they had done. Girls are often subjected to sexual abuse or rape at the hands of police and because girls are seldom charged, tried or sentenced, any contact they may have with the police is not necessarily formally recognized. Sexual violence has contributed to a rapidly escalating HIV epidemic as fear of police deters people from reporting sex offences as well as other crimes.

In a 2010 Report the Special Rapporteur expressed concerns that police in PNG were often in a position where it was difficult for them to enforce the rule of law on account of insufficient financial and human resources, low standards of professionalism and widespread corruption, difficulties in accessing remote rural areas, and a general lack of political will. The resulting situation is a reliance on private security companies who are tasked with carrying out some of the core duties of the police; in 2011 there were more operative private security officers than police (4,800 and 1,200 respectively) illustrating a worrying trend in the eyes of the Special Rapporteur who suggested that "it reflects police weakness and a failure of the State to provide security and freedom from fear."

=== Detention facility conditions ===
While conditions of areas in police lock-ups and correctional institutions vary significantly throughout PNG, there tends to be a general atmosphere of neglect and violence within many areas of detention. Many children are often detained for long periods, sometimes months, in squalid conditions in violation of basic international standards, with little or no medical care, even where they have serious injuries. In some instances medical assistance has been withheld or suspended as additional punishment, or there are delays in taking children to court in order to allow swelling to go down on injuries inflicted by police. The Special Rapporteur found that detention areas in police stations failed to meet international minimum standards for treatment of detainees, with many cells being overcrowded, filthy, with inadequate ventilation and natural light, infested with rodents and insects, and lacking in sufficient bedding, water and food.

While the Police Juvenile Justice Policy and Diversity Protocol has been lauded as "an excellent tool to deal with juveniles in conflict with the law" the Special Rapporteur found that it is not always applied. Despite its mandate that police cells are to be used only in extreme circumstances, in no police stations visited by the Special Rapporteur were juveniles separated from adults placing juveniles at risk of violence, rape and criminal socialization.

Within correctional institutions, juveniles were, in principle separated from adults, though there were a number of instances of youths not being separated from adults, even where there was sufficient space to do so, and there were many cases of juveniles having been remanded in contravention of the Juvenile Court Protocol.

=== Impunity ===
A key enabler of police violence is that officers and commanders enjoy almost complete impunity. HRW in a 2006 Report found that the majority of police face little or no penalty for their abusive actions either administratively or within the court system. Within the police there is little or no willingness to investigate, prosecute or punish offenders. Mechanisms outside the police such as the Ombudsman Commission, Public Solicitor’s Office and civil claims against the State are ineffective in reducing police violence. While there are some examples of sanctions, dismissals or prosecutions "the frequency of these punishments is so low compared with the scale of violations as to render non-existent any deterrent effect."

High-level officials often characterize failure to discipline as lying with the victims who failed to report or follow up on abuses, however individuals spoken to by HRW said that the complaints process is very difficult with complainants often being laughed at, ignored, and, particularly in the case of young girls, asked for sex, meaning the process very rarely achieved results. The Special Rapporteur similarly found that many persons deprived of their liberty were unaware of, or had no trust in, any complaints mechanism that was available to them. When complaint mechanisms for victims fail to work people become discouraged, particularly where complaining just brings them further trouble or retaliations. Other impediments include the threat of "paybacks" which causes police to fear retaliation if they were to report abusive behaviour by a colleague, and the wantok system which demands loyalty to clans or family groups superseding all other obligations.

== Successes ==
Evidence shows that in areas where Juvenile Courts have been established there has followed a marked reduction in juvenile incarceration rates. It has been suggested that much of this success is attributable to the fact that one properly trained Magistrate can have a significant impact on the improvement of sentencing and rehabilitative outcomes for youths whose petty crimes would formerly have resulted in their incarceration but now were being dealt with by way of diversion or fines.

Correctional facilities with dedicated juvenile sections generally provide better living conditions for minors than for adults, including adequate bedding and blankets. In a report by the United Nations Special Rapporteur, the Hohola remand centre was cited as a well-equipped facility offering juvenile detainees access to work and educational programs.

== Community-based justice ==
There exist a number of community based institutions that provide effective means of diverting juveniles away from the more formal state procedures. The most common is the Village Courts which are able to adjudicate disputes through reliance on custom and may hear minor civil and criminal matters but must have District Court approval to jail juveniles. Village Court Act 1989 (PNG), sections 69-70. While community based justice mechanisms are subordinate to official state justice regimes, it has been suggested that their ability to deliver swift justice, often more restorative in nature, within their immediate communities may be a valuable solution to the problem of diverting youths away from the potential harms of the formal State system.
