= International rankings of Papua New Guinea =

These are the international rankings of Papua New Guinea.

== International rankings ==
Organization	Survey	Ranking
Institute for Economics and Peace	Global Peace Index	93 out of 144
United Nations Development Programme	Human Development Index	148 out of 182
Transparency International	Corruption Perceptions Index	154 out of 180
