= Niugini Television Network =

- Country: Papua New Guinea
- Broadcast area: Port Moresby
- Headquarters: Port Moresby, Papua New Guinea

Ownership
- Owner: NBN Limited (Parry Corp)

History
- Launched: 21 January 1987; 39 years ago
- Closed: 15 March 1988; 38 years ago

The Niugini Television Network (NTN) was the first television station in Papua New Guinea. It was built and operated by the Australian regional television station NBN Television from Newcastle. It operated for barely more than a year before shutting down; the launch of the channel was delayed several times due to government pressure.

== History ==
=== Background to its foundation ===
The government of Papua New Guinea first considered having a television service in 1977. The initial plan suggested the creation of a national television service using satellite technology to cover the country by 1982, with battery-powered receivers sent to remote areas. The government rejected the idea of television the following year, under the principle that television would be "counterproductive to development". Shortly after the decision, Ikini Holloway of the National Broadcasting Corporation demanded that television should be introduced with different programming than initially suggested, but one of the three sub-committees was against the introduction of television. Even without television, video cassette recorders began to emerge in Papua New Guinea.

The government passed legislation to introduce satellite television in early 1984. At the time, television was limited to wealthy elites watching either by satellites or by means of videotapes. The Parry Corporation, owners of NBN Television, decided to set up the first television station in the country. Lower class households did not have a television set at the time, and the advertising market in the country was non-existent. NBN Limited issued a pitch to the Cabinet of Papua New Guinea and gained the license to operate in October 1984, set to start in 1985. The company suggested Ebia Olewale as its chairman. The capital was set at A$5.8 million. Parry Corp would hold 25%, the government 15%, Olewale 10% and the remaining 55% was given to local interests. The station would employ a staff of 35, consisting of 12 expats and 23 locals. The commercial programming slots were to be limited between 3.35 pm and 10.40 pm, with daytime programming at the mercy of the government.

To avoid producing content that would provoke cultural shock to a country without television, NBN sought advice from United Nations agencies UNESCO and Unicef.

NTN received its license in December 1984 and was scheduled to open on 16 September 1985, the tenth anniversary of Papua New Guinea's independence. In the year it was scheduled to open, the station entered into a conflict with the Somare government, who opposed the introduction of television, claiming it to be "overt colonial imperialism". Facing these criticisms, NTN rescheduled its launch for 18 July 1986.

On 8 July 1986, ahead of the planned launch of NTN, the prime minister demanded the suspension of all potential terrestrial and extant cable television companies before the conclusion of an inquiry in February 1987. Only in January 1987, NTN had given the right to broadcast. The service was limited to Port Moresby, unlike the previous plan which suggested additional relays in Lae, Goroka and Mount Hagen.

=== Signing on ===
NTN opened on VHF channel 7 on 21 January 1987, months ahead of the 24 July launch date of EM TV on channel 9. NTN also aired a local version of Romper Room, which was based on the NBN Television version.

=== Shutdown ===
The effects of Black Monday by the end of 1987 caused Kevin Parry to sell his stock held at NBN Enterprises due to a management buyout. Attempts to sell the station to Alan Bond, owner of half of EM TV, were made, however the government was against Bond's domination of national television.

On 15 March 1988, NTN shut down, citing "ending legal action against Papua New Guinea authorities connected with broadcasting affairs". Plans for a revival were scrapped when Media Niugini Limited bought the station's equipment for $1 million.
