= List of non-marine molluscs of Papua New Guinea =

Location of Papua New Guinea

The non-marine molluscs of Papua New Guinea are a part of the molluscan fauna of Papua New Guinea (fauna of New Guinea).

== Land gastropods ==
Hydrocenidae

- Hydrocena spiralis Wiktor, 1998

Diplommatinidae

- Palaina bundiana Wiktor, 1998

Cyclophoridae

- Dominamaria calvata Wiktor, 1998

Helicarionidae

- Cryptaustenia mirabilis Wiktor, 2002
- Cryptaustenia saltatoria Wiktor, 2002

Pupinidae

- Pupina bella Wiktor, 1998
- Pupina flexuosa Wiktor, 1998
- Pupina remota Wiktor, 1998
- Pupina variegata Wiktor, 1998

Camaenidae

- Papustyla pulcherrima Rensch, 1931

Caecidae

- Caecum directum Vannozzi, 2019
- Caecum frugi Vannozzi, 2019
- Caecum granulatum Vannozzi, 2019
- Caecum nasutum Vannozzi, 2019
- Caecum neoguineanum Vannozzi, 2019
- Caecum nofronii Vannozzi, 2019
- Parastrophia cornucopiae (de Folin, 1869)

== See also ==
- Molluscs of New Guinea – entire island.
- List of non-marine molluscs of Australia
