= Human rights in Papua New Guinea =

Papua New Guinea (PNG) is a constitutional parliamentary democracy with an estimated population of 6,187,591. Police brutality, provincial power struggles, violence against women, and government corruption all contribute to the low awareness of basic human rights in the country.

== History and legal framework ==
=== Constitutional and other domestic law ===
The Constitution of Papua New Guinea entered into force on the 16 September 1975. It is one of the few unique constitutions around the world that contains almost all the rights and freedoms enshrined the United Nations Charter and the Universal Declaration of Human Rights 1948. The constitution contains many civil and political rights that are able to be enforced by the judiciary. These include right to freedom (Section 32); right to life (Section 35); freedom from inhuman treatment (Section 36); freedom of conscience, thought and religion (Section 45); freedom of expression (Section 46) and right to vote and stand for public office (Section 50). Economic, social and cultural rights are not included in the constitution and are instead provided for in the National Goals and Directive Principles. These remain as guidelines and are non-justiciable.

However, the Constitution does not include “gender” or “sex” as a prohibited ground of discrimination, which is inconsistent with PNG's obligations under the UN Convention on the Elimination of All Forms of Discrimination against Women, Article 2.

=== International treaties ===
PNG has ratified 6 of the core human rights treaties; the third highest number in the Pacific behind New Zealand and Australia. These include the International Covenant on Civil and Political Rights (ICCPR), International Covenant on Economic, Social and Cultural Rights (ICESCR), the International Convention for the Elimination of All Forms of Racial Discrimination (CERD), the Convention on the Rights of the Child (CRC), the Convention on the Elimination of All Forms of Discrimination Against Women (CEDAW) and the Convention on the Rights of Persons with Disabilities (CRPD), ratified in 2013. Despite this the most recent Amnesty International submission prepared for the Universal Periodic Review (UPR) of PNG in May 2011 found that reporting by the government of PNG on its obligations under the international human rights treaties to which it is party has been very poor.

PNG joined the United Nations (UN) in 1975 and on the 11 May 2011 extended a standing invitation to all the thematic mechanisms of the United Nations Commission on Human Rights to visit the country. In May 2010 the United Nations Special Rapporteur on Torture visited PNG and suggested that the country urgently Ratify the Convention Against Torture (CAT) and its Optional Protocol. As well as this the rapporteur also suggested that PNG ratify the first Optional Protocol to the ICCPR which provides for the right of victims to lodge individual complaints to the United Nations Human Rights Committee and also the second Optional Protocol aiming at the abolition of the death penalty. PNG has not yet ratified these instruments.

=== National Human Rights Commission ===
In 1997, the government approved in principle the establishment of a human rights commission for PNG with the minimum standards set by the Paris Principles. This commitment was reaffirmed in 2007 with the presentation of the 2007 Final Option Paper on the establishment of the PNG human rights commission; and in 2008 a draft organic law on the establishment of a human rights commission was prepared. This draft Bill has yet to go through the parliamentary process and it is unclear whether the O'Neill Government remains committed to the establishment of this institution.

== Civil and political rights ==
The Constitution provides for the right of citizens to change their government peacefully which is exercised in practice through periodic elections. All citizens possess the right to vote and political parties are able to operate free from restriction and outside influence. However, in the most recent elections violence was common in the Highlands which compromised the possibility of free and fair voting.

The right to freedom of speech and freedom of press as provided for in the Constitution are generally respected. There is no evidence of officially sanctioned government censorship, however newspaper owners have complained about intimidation tactics being used in an attempt to influence coverage.

The right to freedom of assembly is also present in the constitution however is often limited in practice. Public demonstrations require 14 days notice as well as police approval which is rarely granted.

== Women's rights ==
Papua New Guinea is often labelled as potentially the worst place in the world for violence against women.

=== Sexual violence ===
A study by Rachel Jewkes et al., in The Lancet in 2013, on behalf of the United Nations Multi-country Cross-sectional Study on Men and Violence research team, found that 41% of men on Bougainville Island, Papua New Guinea, admit to raping a non-partner. About 14.1% of men have committed multiple perpetrator rape. Other research indicates that two thirds of women have experienced domestic violence and fifty percent of women have experienced forced sex. Rape is a crime punishable by imprisonment, but a prevalent culture of silence has resulted in few rapists being apprehended. Police officials have been directly implicated in the widespread sexual violence against women.

Polygyny, as well as the custom of paying a ‘bride price’ to obtain a bride, are recurring problems, as is using women as compensation between tribes to settle disputes. The courts have ruled that such settlements have denied the women their constitutional rights. In July 2010 the Committee on the Elimination of Discrimination against Women urged the government to "put in place without delay a comprehensive strategy, including legislation, to modify or eliminate customary practices and stereotypes that discriminate against women in conformity with articles 2, 2 (f) and 5 (a) of the Convention." There are no employment or antidiscrimination laws.

=== Witch-hunts ===
Women are 6 times more likely to be accused of sorcery than men and hundreds of accused witches and sorcerers are killed annually. The accusers often hire diviners known as a "Glass man" or "Glass mary" to confirm the accusation. The accused are often the weak of society, such as widows, while those with sons to support them have a higher chance of not being accused. Relatives often reject giving refuge to the accused because they have been paid a bride price by the husband, which would have to be returned if the wife leaves the husband. While killing witches used to be done discreetly, it has grown into a public spectacle.

In 2009, a group of men stripped a woman naked, bound her hands and feet, forced a cloth in her mouth and then burnt her to death on a dumpsite. In 2009 a committee was established under the Constitutional Review and Law Reform Commission, to review the laws relating to sorcery and other measures to curb the number of sorcery-related murders. In 2013, the government repealed a law that criminalized sorcery and the use of accusing someone of witchcraft as a defense in murder trials.

== Children's rights ==
According to UNICEF, nearly half of reported rape victims are under 15 years of age and 13% are under 7 years of age, while a report by ChildFund Australia citing former Parliamentarian Dame Carol Kidu claimed 50% of those seeking medical help after rape are under 16, 25% are under 12 and 10% are under 8.

== Ethnic discrimination ==
With over 800 indigenous tribes and languages, PNG is one of the most heterogeneous countries in the world. Recognition of indigenous rights in the country is poor and the divide in language, customs and tradition, has resulted in regular intertribal feuds. PNG has not ratified either the ILO Convention on Indigenous and Tribal Peoples in Independent Countries 1989 (CITP) or the United Nations Declaration on the Rights of Indigenous Peoples. Clans and tribes in New Guinea have fought each other for centuries over various disputes such as land. While the bow and arrows has been the staple weapon for centuries, the recent introduction of automatic firearms have led to more tragic outcomes.

== Land rights ==
On May 27, 2010 the government of PNG passed the Environment (Amendment) Bill 2010 which amends sections of the Environment and Conservation Act 2000 and gives the Secretary of the Department of Conservation the power to approve activities by mining and petroleum companies without the agreement of the traditional landowners. Any approval issued by the director will be final and “may not be challenged or reviewed in any court or tribunal, except at the instigation of an Authorization Instrument”.

These amendments are in contravention of the right of indigenous people to own land under s 53 of the constitution and Articles 14, 15 and 16 of the CITP as well as traditional customary law which recognises indigenous customary title to land. They also violate article 15.2 of the CITP which asserts that where the state retains ownership of sub-surface resources they shall consult indigenous peoples before undertaking or permitting any programs for the exploitation of such resources in regards to their lands.

Although the right of indigenous peoples to own land is protected under the constitution, this only pertains to the first six feet below the surface of the land. As a result, the government can lease mining rights to companies to mine below the lands surface. Mining corporation Barrick Gold has been leased mining rights to mine in Porgera in the Southern Highlands. As a result, there have been forced eviction of people from their homes and serious misconduct by police in this area. Amnesty International found that there were no effective means for people of the public could complain against the police acting in violation of international law and standards.

== Historical situation ==
The following chart shows Papua New Guinea's ratings since 1975 in the Freedom in the World reports, published annually by Freedom House. A score of 1 is "most free" and 7 is "least free".

Historical ratings

Year	Political Rights	Civil Liberties	Status	Prime Minister
1975	3	2	Partly Free	Michael Somare
1976	2	2	Free	Michael Somare
1977	2	2	Free	Michael Somare
1978	2	2	Free	Michael Somare
1979	2	2	Free	Michael Somare
1980	2	2	Free	Julius Chan
1981	2	2	Free	Julius Chan
1982	2	2	Free	Michael Somare
1983	2	2	Free	Michael Somare
1984	2	2	Free	Michael Somare
1985	2	2	Free	Paias Wingti
1986	2	2	Free	Paias Wingti
1987	2	2	Free	Paias Wingti
1988	2	3	Free	Rabbie Namaliu
1989	2	2	Free	Rabbie Namaliu
1990	2	3	Free	Rabbie Namaliu
1991	2	3	Free	Rabbie Namaliu
1992	2	3	Free	Paias Wingti
1993	2	4	Partly Free	Paias Wingti
1994	2	4	Partly Free	Julius Chan
1995	2	4	Partly Free	Julius Chan
1996	2	4	Partly Free	Julius Chan
1997	2	4	Partly Free	Bill Skate
1998	2	3	Free	Bill Skate
1999	2	3	Free	Mekere Morauta
2000	2	3	Free	Mekere Morauta
2001	2	3	Free	Mekere Morauta
2002	2	3	Free	Michael Somare
2003	3	3	Partly Free	Michael Somare
2004	3	3	Partly Free	Michael Somare
2005	3	3	Partly Free	Michael Somare
2006	3	3	Partly Free	Michael Somare
2007	3	3	Partly Free	Michael Somare
2008	4	3	Partly Free	Michael Somare
2009	4	3	Partly Free	Michael Somare
2010	4	3	Partly Free	Sam Abal (acting for Somare)
2011	4	3	Partly Free	Peter O'Neill/Michael Somare (disputed)
2012	4	3	Partly Free	Peter O'Neill
2013	3	3	Partly Free	Peter O'Neill
2014	4	3	Partly Free	Peter O'Neill

== See also ==
- Ethnic violence in Papua New Guinea
- LGBT rights in Papua New Guinea
- Juvenile justice in Papua New Guinea
