= National Broadcasting Corporation of Papua New Guinea =

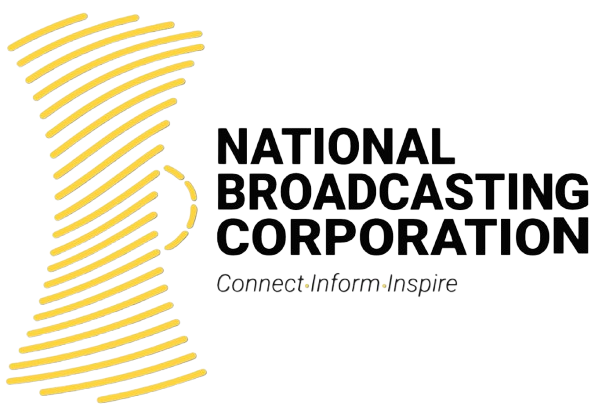
- Type: Corporation
- Availability: Papua New Guinea
- Motto: "Connect, Inform, Inspire"
- Headquarters: Port Moresby
- Broadcast area: Papua New Guinea
- Owner: Government of Papua New Guinea
- Launch date: December 1973; 52 years ago (Radio); 16 September 2008; 18 years ago (Television)
- Former names: National Broadcasting Commission
- Callsigns: NBC
- Callsign meaning: National; Broadcasting; Corporation

The National Broadcasting Corporation of Papua New Guinea (NBC PNG) is Papua New Guinea's state owned broadcaster. Its head office is located along Sir Hubert Murray Highway, 5 Mile, Port Moresby, and has 22 Provincial Radio Stations around the country. It operates two National Radio Stations – NBC Radio (90.7 FM) which also broadcasts on the AM Frequency 585 MHz with Tribe 92FM (92.3FM) – and one television station NBC TV (formerly Kundu 2 and National Television Service).

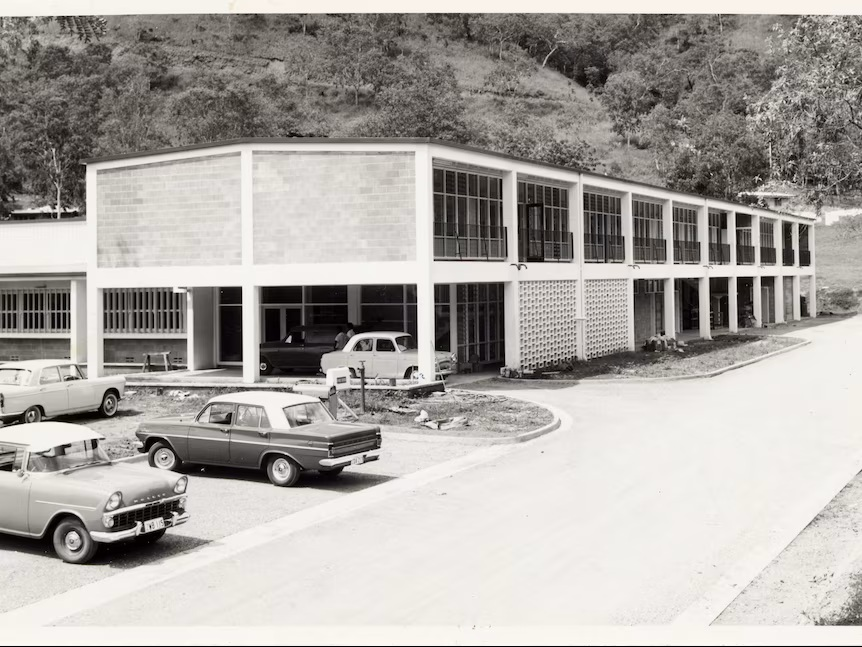
Broadcast House at 5 Mile Port Moresby in 1965, before becoming the headquarters of the NBC in 1973

NBC was established under the Broadcasting Commission Act (Authority of Parliament) on 1 December 1973 and was known as National Broadcasting Commission, until 1994 when it took the present name.

== NBC Radio ==
NBC Radio is the Radio Programs Division of NBC PNG.

=== Main station ===
The main station broadcasts on frequency 90.7 FM and 585 MW on AM band.

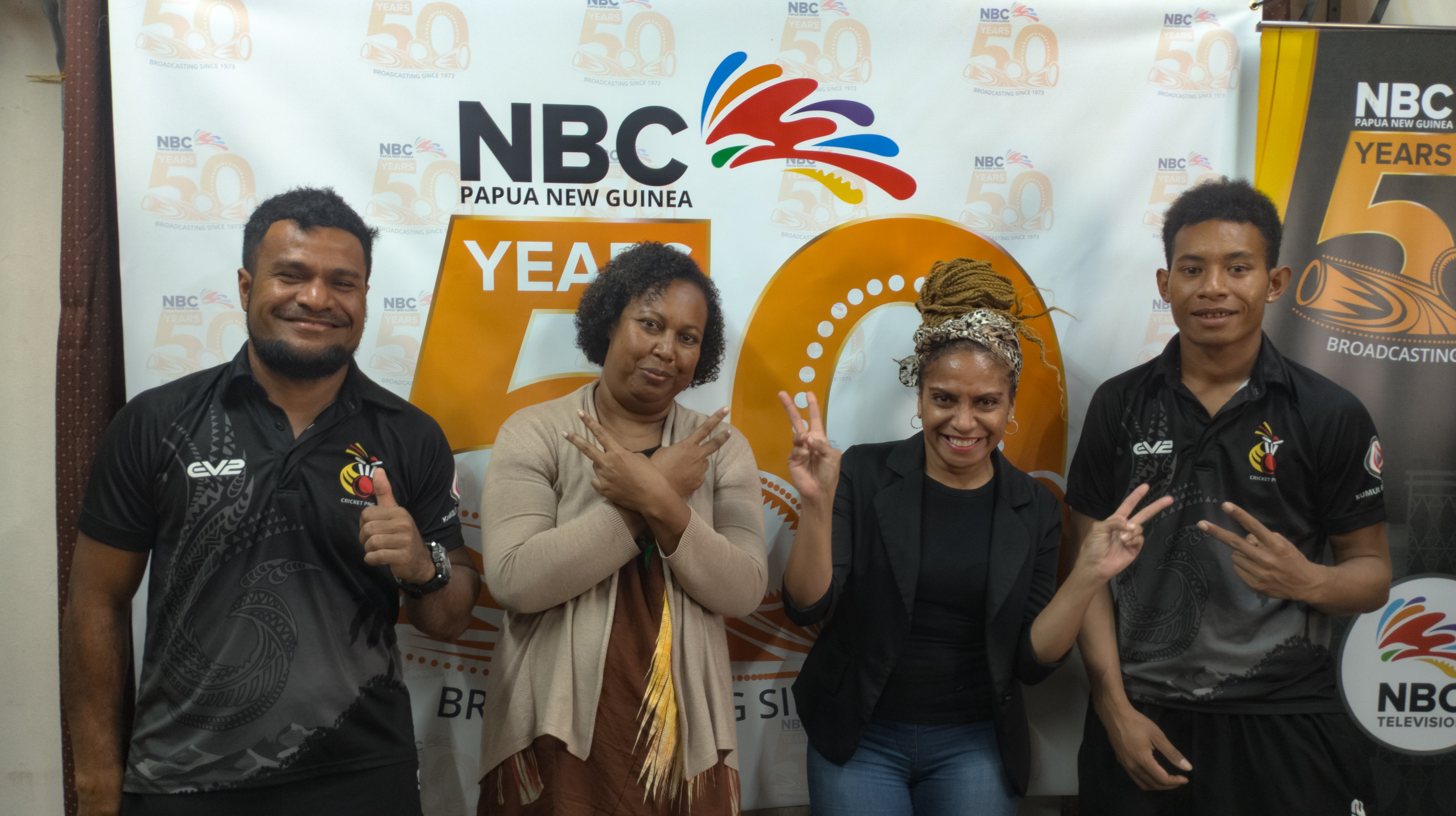
PNG National Cricket team (Barramundis) with NBC Radio's Josephine Oberlueter

==== Weekday Programming (Main) ====
| Program | Timeslot | Presenter | Producers |
|---|---|---|---|
| Wake Up with NBC | 0500 – 0900 | Mark Ali | Josephine Oberleuter & Timothy Vanua |
| Let's Talk About it | 0900 – 1200 | Stephen Mase | Josephine Oberleuter & Timothy Vanua |
| Noon to 4 | 1200 – 1500 | Aileen Asi | Enos Kalo & Michael Moia |
| Pacific Beat | 1500 – 1600 | Relayed | |
| PM Edition | 1600 – 1900 | Hans Messea | Enos Kalo & Michael Moia |
| Night Beat | 1900 – 2300 | Micheal Arifeae | McRei Kei & Nelson Noma |

=== Tribe 92FM ===
Tribe 92FM is the NBC's younger arm of radio that hosts music and talk for a younger audience. It broadcasts on frequency 92.3 FM to parts of Papua New Guinea.

==== Tribe as a Segment on NBC Radio ====
In 2008, Tribe was created as a segment every Saturday nights from 9pm to 12 Midnight on NBC Radio to talk about issues faced and trending topics regarding the young voices of PNG. The hosts during that time consisted of Dylan Mallar, Josephine Oberleuter and Vinna Wingur.

==== Tribe 92FM as a station ====
In August 2015, the segment became a fully fledged radio station with the inclusion of new personalities following the departure of Dylan and Josephine. The new personalities or 'Tribers' included, Alice Ashwin, Heidee Woito, Olivia Jimmy, Jivannah Thavala, James Leia, Michael Sanginumbuk, Michael Arifeae and Timothy Vanua headed by then Executive Producer for Tribe Shane Amean. Further departures followed with Olivia, Jivannah, Alice (all three to Kalang), Michael Sanginumbuk (to NBC TV), Timothy Vanua and Micheal Arifeae (to National Radio). New Tribers included, Raymond Polon, Hazel Parpa (exit in 2021), Maureen Orea in 2017 followed by Jason Omba, Tamal Watt and Ishmael Saulep in 2020. Benjamin Rapilla and Juanita joined the team in 2023. The current Executive Producer is Matilda Gaveva.

==== Weekday Programming (Tribe 92FM) ====
| Tribe Program | Timeslot | Presenter | Producers |
|---|---|---|---|
| AM Fix | 0600 – 1000 | Maureen "Moe" Orea | Juanita Asi |
| Midday Pulse | 1000 – 1400 | Tamal Watt | Benjamin Rapilla |
| Lekfaia | 1400 – 1800 | Jason Omba | Mary Trakalowa |
| Tribing Your Nights | 1900 – 0000 | Ishmael Saulep | Raymond Polon |

=== NBC Provincial Radio Stations ===
- Radio New Ireland
- Radio Chimbu
- Radio Enga
- Radio Southern Highlands
- Radio Sandaun
- Rado East Sepik
- Radio Madang
- Radio Central
- Radio Gulf
- Radio Western
- Radio Northern
- Radio Morobe
- Radio Milne Bay
- Radio Eastern Highlands
- Radio Western Highlands
- Radio Manus
- Radio East Britain
- Radio West New Britain
- Radio Bougainville

=== Social media ===
| Platform | Officer |
|---|---|
| Facebook (Promos & Updates) | Admins |

== NBC Television ==
NBC TV, formerly known as Kundu 2 Television and National Television Service, is the television division of NBC PNG. It was launched on 16 September 2008 as a platform for the National Government to provide information services for Papua New Guineans.

NBC TV now broadcasts digitally, switching from analog in December 2024. Viewers can watch in HD through a set top box with 22 digital channels available for free.

== See also ==
- Communications in Papua New Guinea
