= EM TV =

National television service in Papua New Guinea

EMTV
- Former logo of EMTV
- Country: Papua New Guinea
- Broadcast area: Nationwide
- Headquarters: Port Moresby

Ownership
- Owner: Media Niugini (Telikom PNG)

History
- Launched: 24 July 1987; 39 years ago

EMTV is a commercial television station in Papua New Guinea. For most of its life until the launch of the National Television Service in September 2008, it was the country's only free-to-air television service.

It is owned by Telikom PNG through a subsidiary Media Niugini. It was previously owned by Fiji Television Limited and Nine Network Australia.

== History ==
=== Background ===
Television in Papua New Guinea was first suggested in 1964, when it was still an Australian territory, per a World Bank mission, with the initial aim of introducing an educational service for schools. A two-man commission for the development of television was set up in October 1965 by Professor Derek Broadbent and Douglas Brooke. It was expected that their findings were to be sent to Administrator Donald Cleland in January 1966.

The parent company behind EM TV, Media Niugini, was set up in 1984 delivering videotape foreign programming to public places. These tapes also included some local advertising inserts and community announcements.

In 1986 the Post and Telecommunications Corporation (PTC) issued licenses to two television stations, EM TV and NTN.

=== Early years ===
The station commenced broadcasting in July 1987 in Port Moresby. It was a 50-50 joint venture between the Nine Network and other investors. It followed the short-lived Niugini Television Network, owned by NBN, which operated from January 1987 to March 1988. The TV-owning audience was already served by free and subscription satellite and cable TV services, including part-Nine affiliate Television North Queensland.

In April 1988, the station opened relays in Lae, Mt. Hagen, Goroka, Arawa and Rabaul. The next year, the Post and Telecommunications Department (PTC) made a microwave bearer available for live transmission in Lae, Mt. Hagen, Goroka, and Madang.

=== Development ===
In November 1993, EMTV moved off the PTC's bearer and transferred program distribution to a satellite system. The current satellite footprint allows the signal to be seen within all of PNG, and as far away as Pakistan, India, Australia, New Zealand, and Fiji.

Today, EM TV operates two transmitters in Port Moresby, and leases and maintains six downlink and retransmission centers in Lae, Rabaul, Mt Hagen, Goroka, Madang, and Kavieng. Other groups such as mine sites, cable operators, and local community groups have set up their satellite receivers and redistribute the signal in areas such as Pogera, Ok Tedi (Tabubil), Misima, Lihir, Kutubu, Wewak, Kimbe, Popondetta, Manus and many other smaller areas.

== Affiliation with Nine Network ==
EMTV was previously owned by Nine Network Australia, from where most of its shows, idents, slogans, and ads were sourced. One of the most recognizable Nine Network affiliate ship flag was EMTV's 2004 ident, which used Nine's 'Still the One' music, first used by ABC in the United States in 1976. This ident is still in use today, despite EMTV dropping its affiliation with Nine in late 2006 when it was sold to Fiji Television Limited, leading to a slowdown in the network's quality of television, and the dropping of Nine's American television lineup. EMTV continues to host many shows produced by Nine, as it still shows Nine's Australian shows through 2009, including Domestic Blitz, the Today Show, and RPA.

After the split, EMTV began showing other shows such as The Simpsons, Grey's Anatomy, Army Wives, Neighbours and 24, which are held by Nine's rivals, Network Ten and the Seven Network. From its beginning, instead of buying from the Nine Network, due to licensing rules, EM TV bought foreign content and sporting events direct from the producers and rights holders.

== News and current affairs ==
EMTV's news flagship is EMTV News and is telecast daily from 6 pm. They show locally made news reports. Being Papua New Guinea's only commercial station, EMTV controls a major aspect of news in the country.
