= Landlady's wig =

Landlady's wig can refer to two kinds of seaweeds:

- Ahnfeltia plicata
- Desmarestia

== See also ==
- Landlord
- Wig
