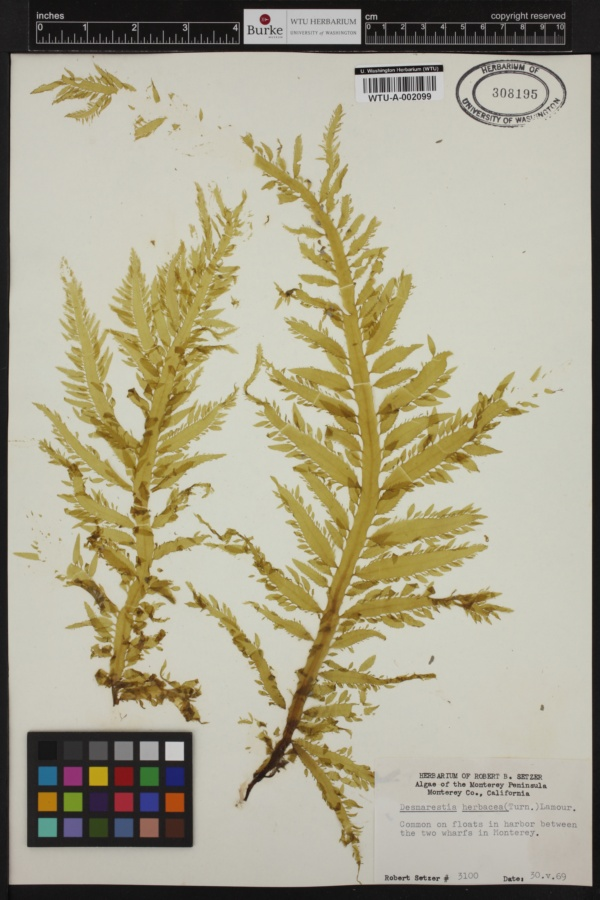

Scientific classification
- Domain: Eukaryota
- Clade: Diaphoretickes
- Clade: Sar
- Clade: Stramenopiles
- Phylum: Gyrista
- Subphylum: Ochrophytina
- Class: Phaeophyceae
- Order: Desmarestiales
- Family: Desmarestiaceae
- Genus: Desmarestia
- Species: D. herbacea

Binomial name
- Desmarestia herbacea (Turner) J.V.Lamouroux

= Desmarestia herbacea =

Species of brown algae

Desmarestia herbacea is a species of brown algae found worldwide. Its common names include color changer, Desmarest's flattened weed, and sea sorrel, though the last name can also refer to other species of Desmarestia.

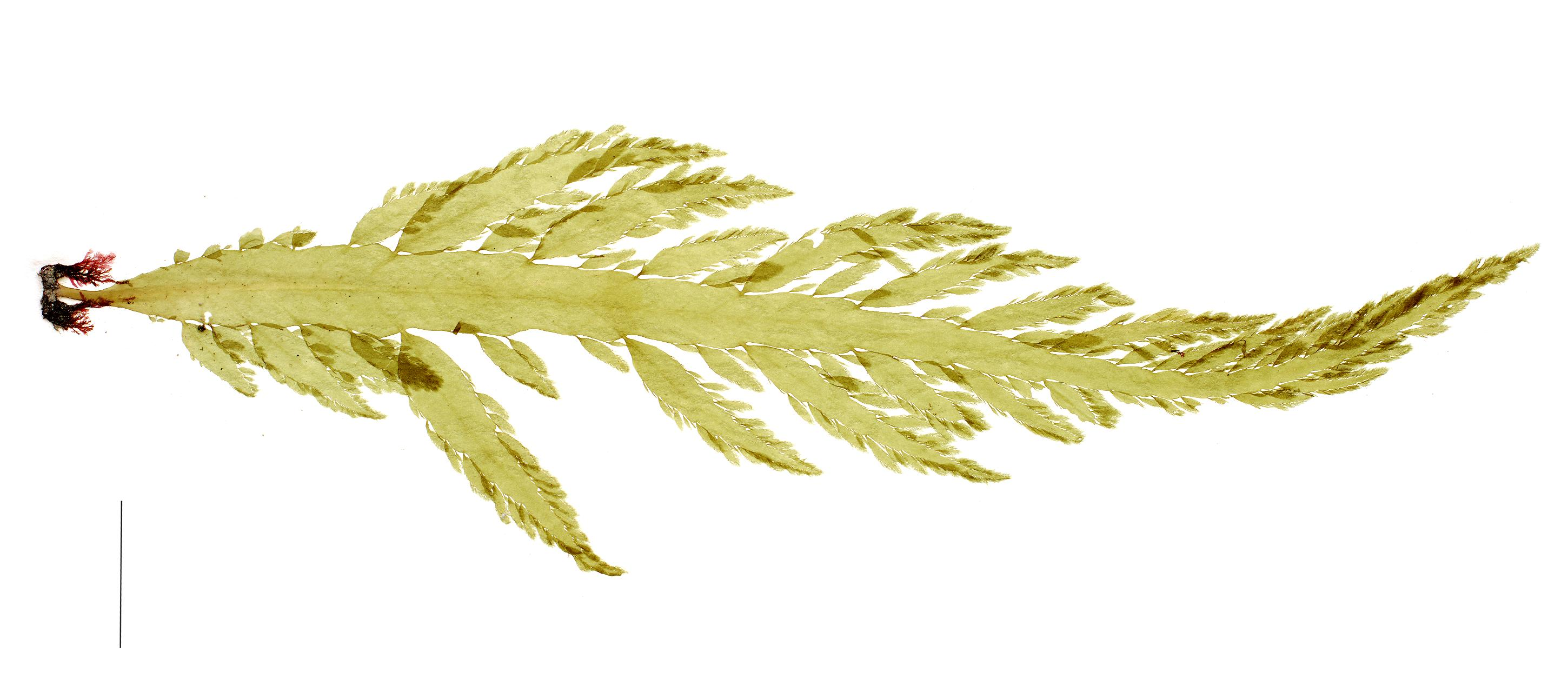
Desmarestia herbacea

== Photos ==
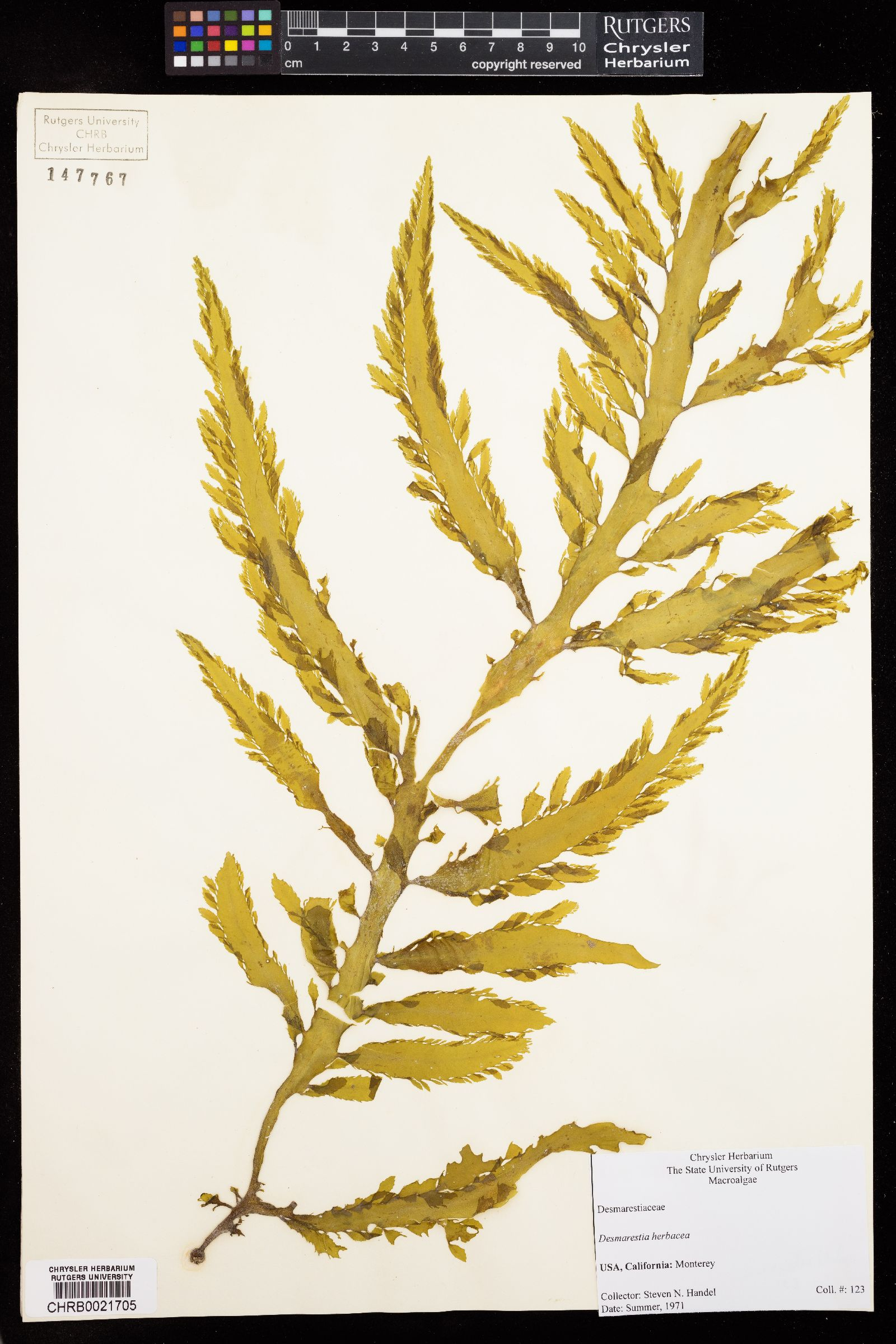
Collected and pressed sample

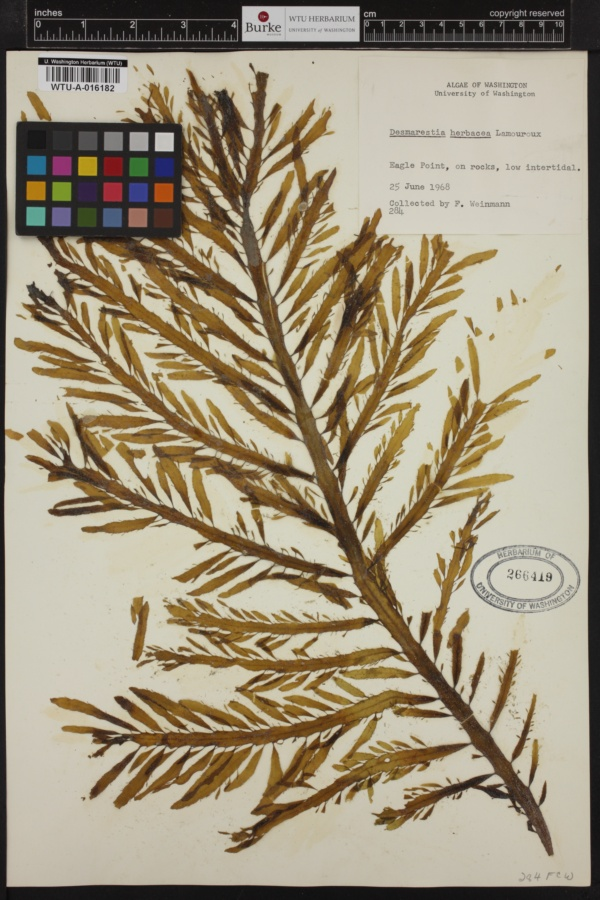
Collected and pressed sample

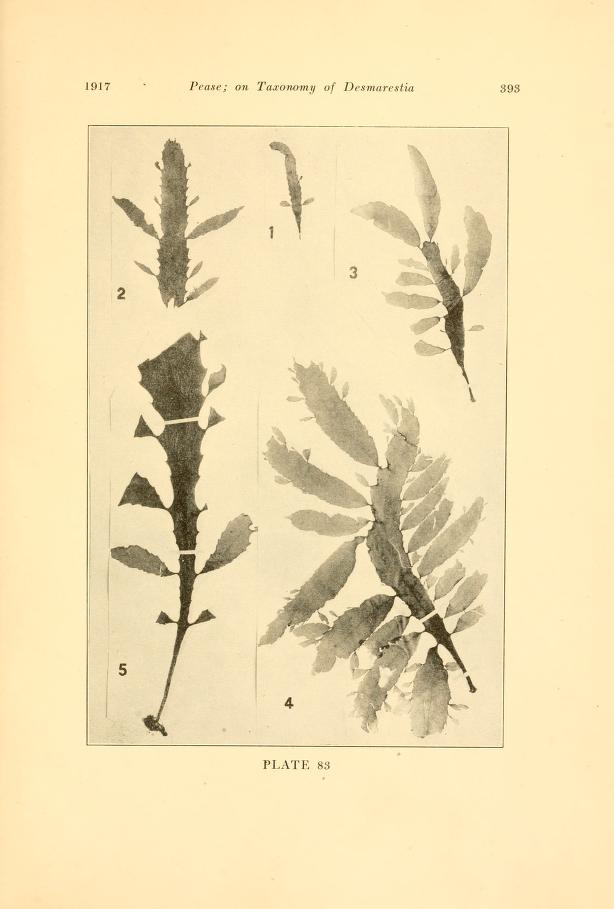
Photo illustration from Puget Sound Marine Station publications
