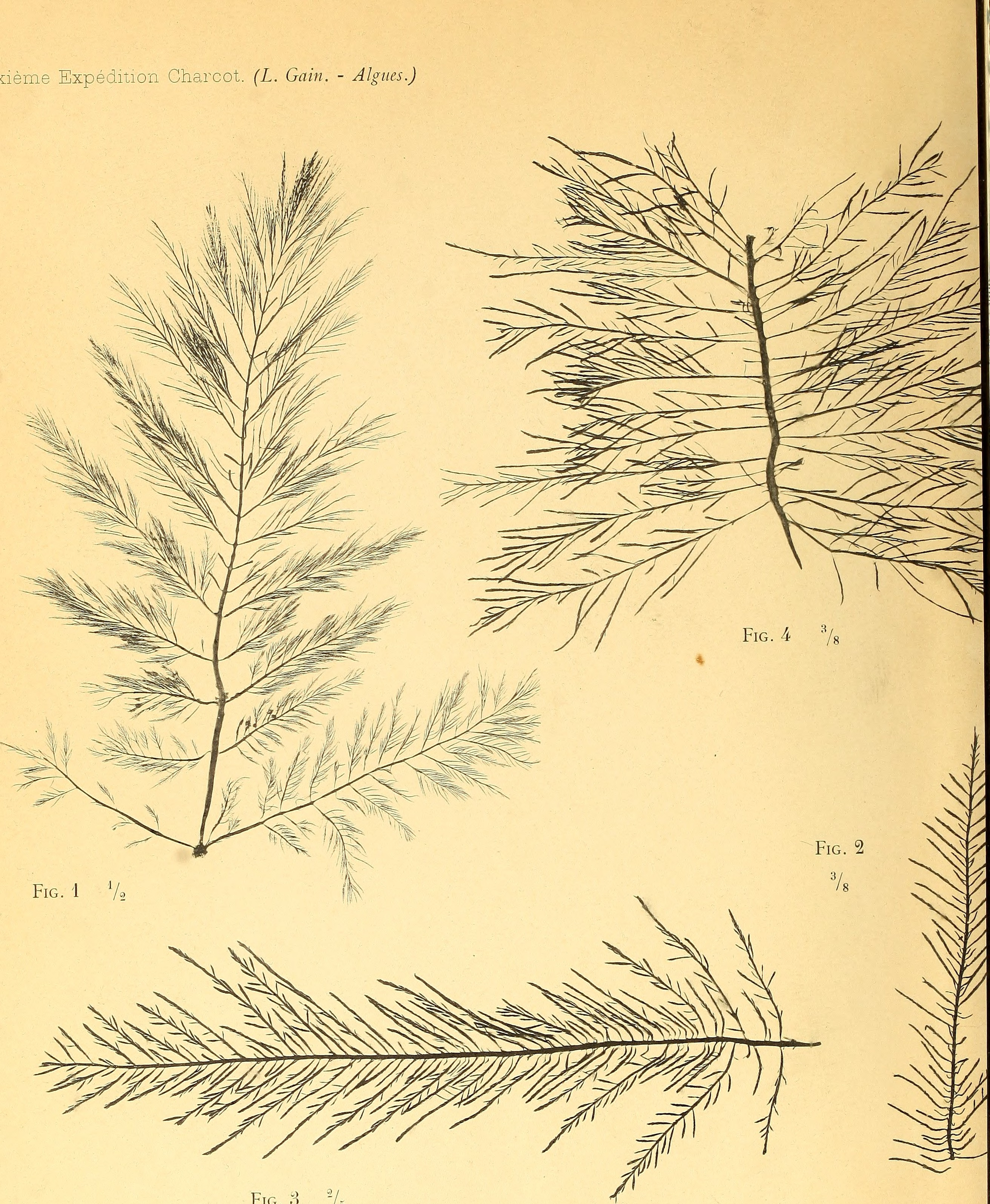
- Figures 2 to 4

Scientific classification
- Domain: Eukaryota
- Clade: Diaphoretickes
- Clade: SAR
- Clade: Stramenopiles
- Phylum: Gyrista
- Subphylum: Ochrophytina
- Class: Phaeophyceae
- Order: Desmarestiales
- Family: Desmarestiaceae
- Genus: Desmarestia
- Species: D. anceps

Binomial name
- Desmarestia anceps Montagne

= Desmarestia anceps =

Species of alga

Desmarestia anceps is a species of brown algae found in the Antarctic Peninsula.
