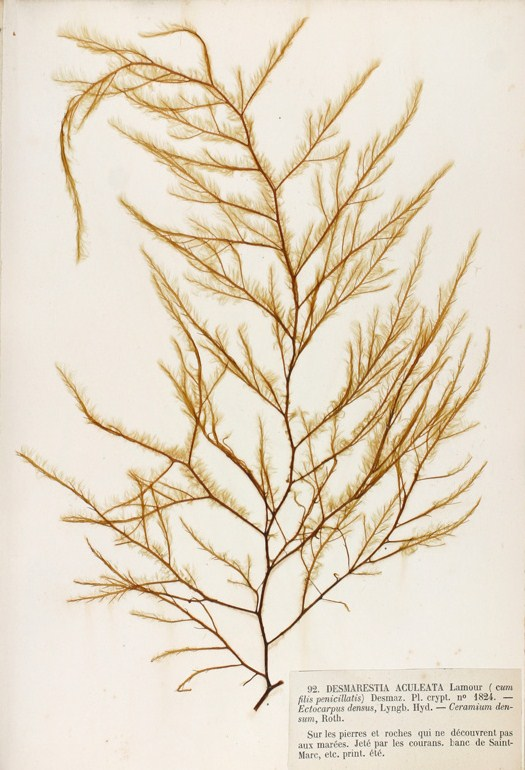

Scientific classification
- Domain: Eukaryota
- Clade: Diaphoretickes
- Clade: SAR
- Clade: Stramenopiles
- Phylum: Gyrista
- Subphylum: Ochrophytina
- Class: Phaeophyceae
- Order: Desmarestiales
- Family: Desmarestiaceae
- Genus: Desmarestia
- Species: D. aculeata

Binomial name
- Desmarestia aculeata (L.) J.V.Lamouroux

= Desmarestia aculeata =

Species of alga

Desmarestia aculeata is a species of brown algae found worldwide. Its common names include color changer, Desmarest's flattened weed, and sea sorrel, though the last name can refer to other species of Desmarestia.

== Photos ==
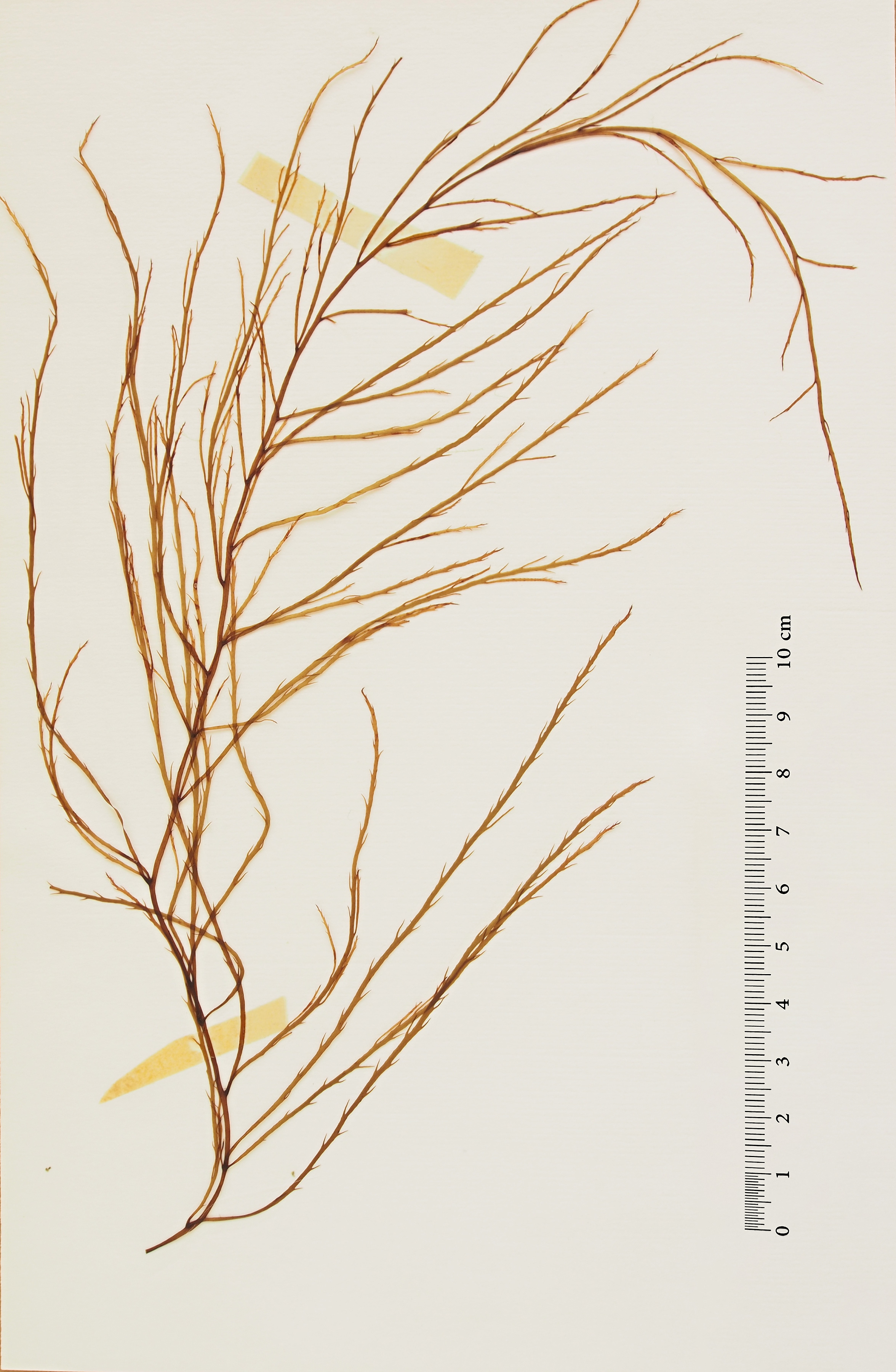
Collected and pressed sample 1988

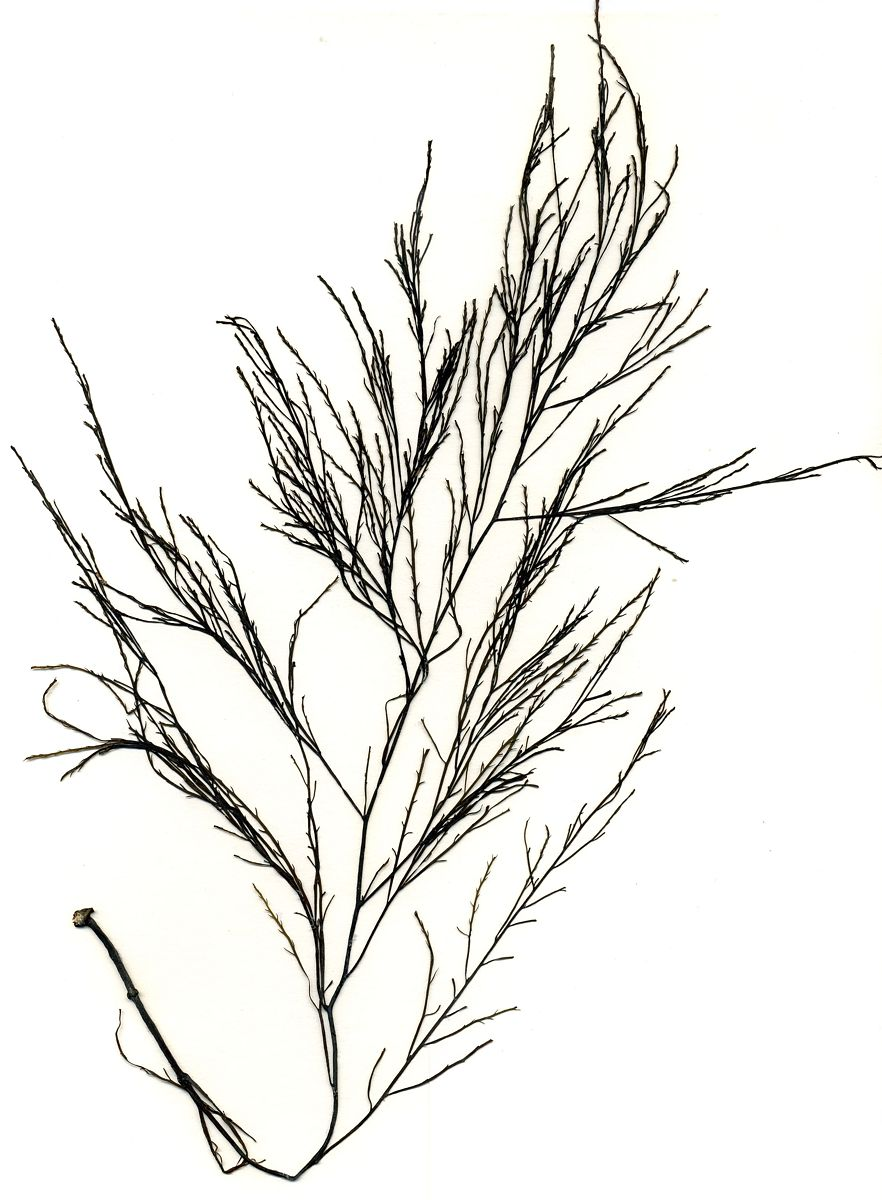
Collected and pressed sample 1985

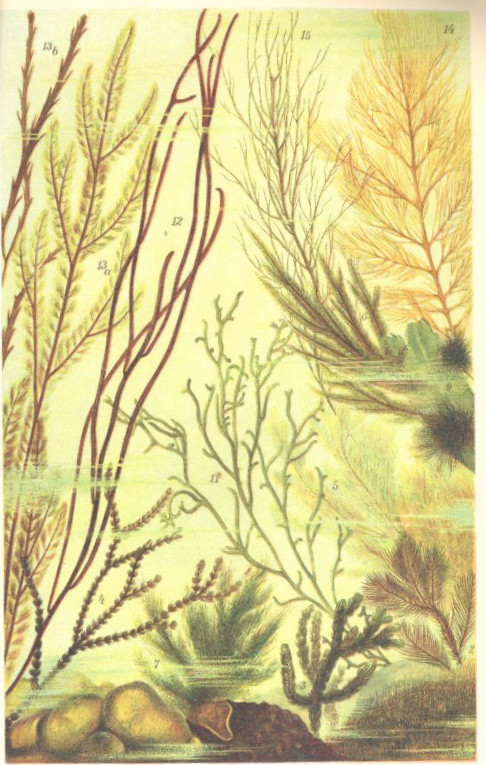
Aquatic Botany 1906 Artist rendition Desmarestia aculeata - figure 13a/b

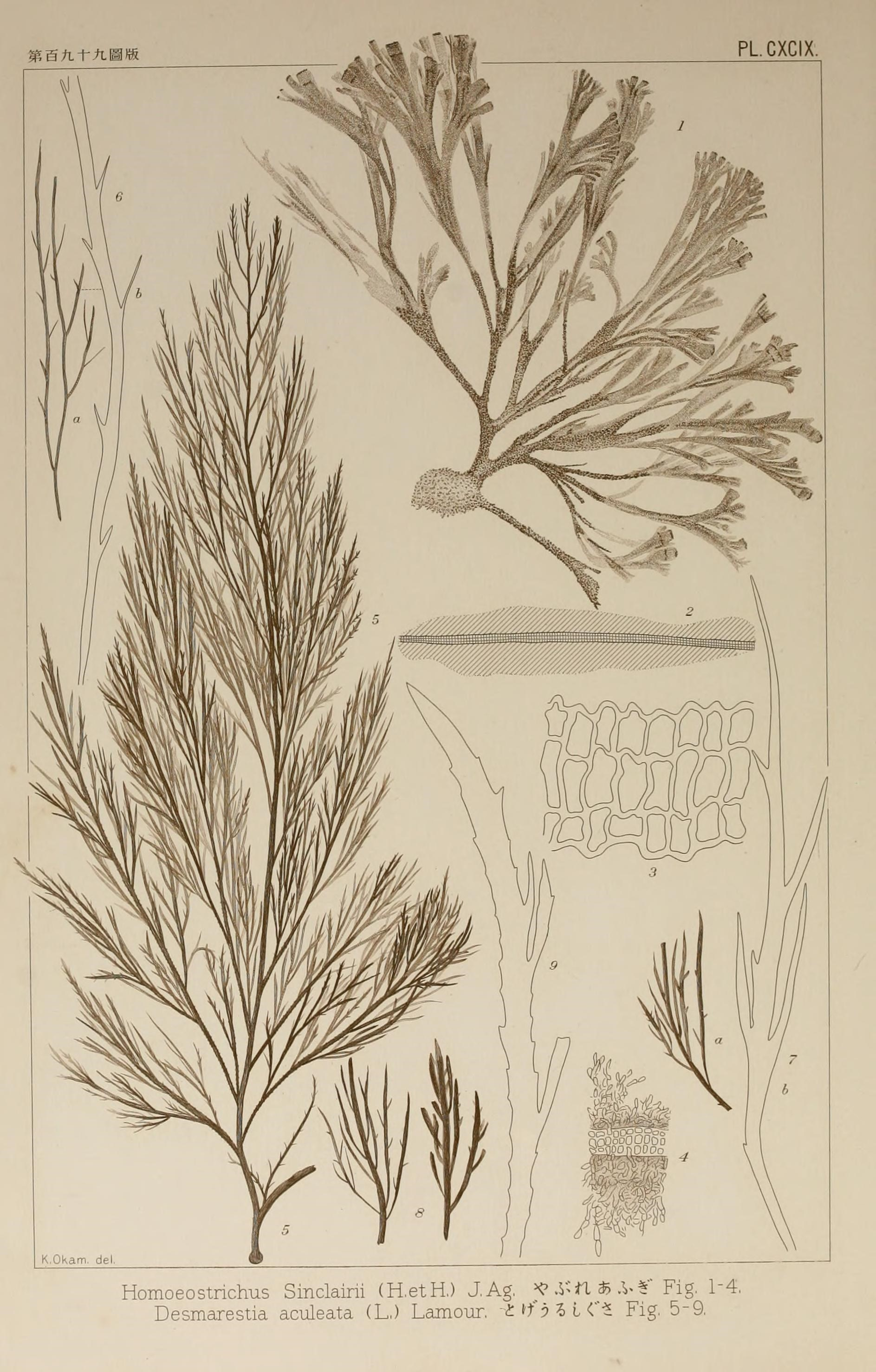
Icones of Japanese algae v.4 1907-1942 Desmarestia aculeata figures 5 - 9

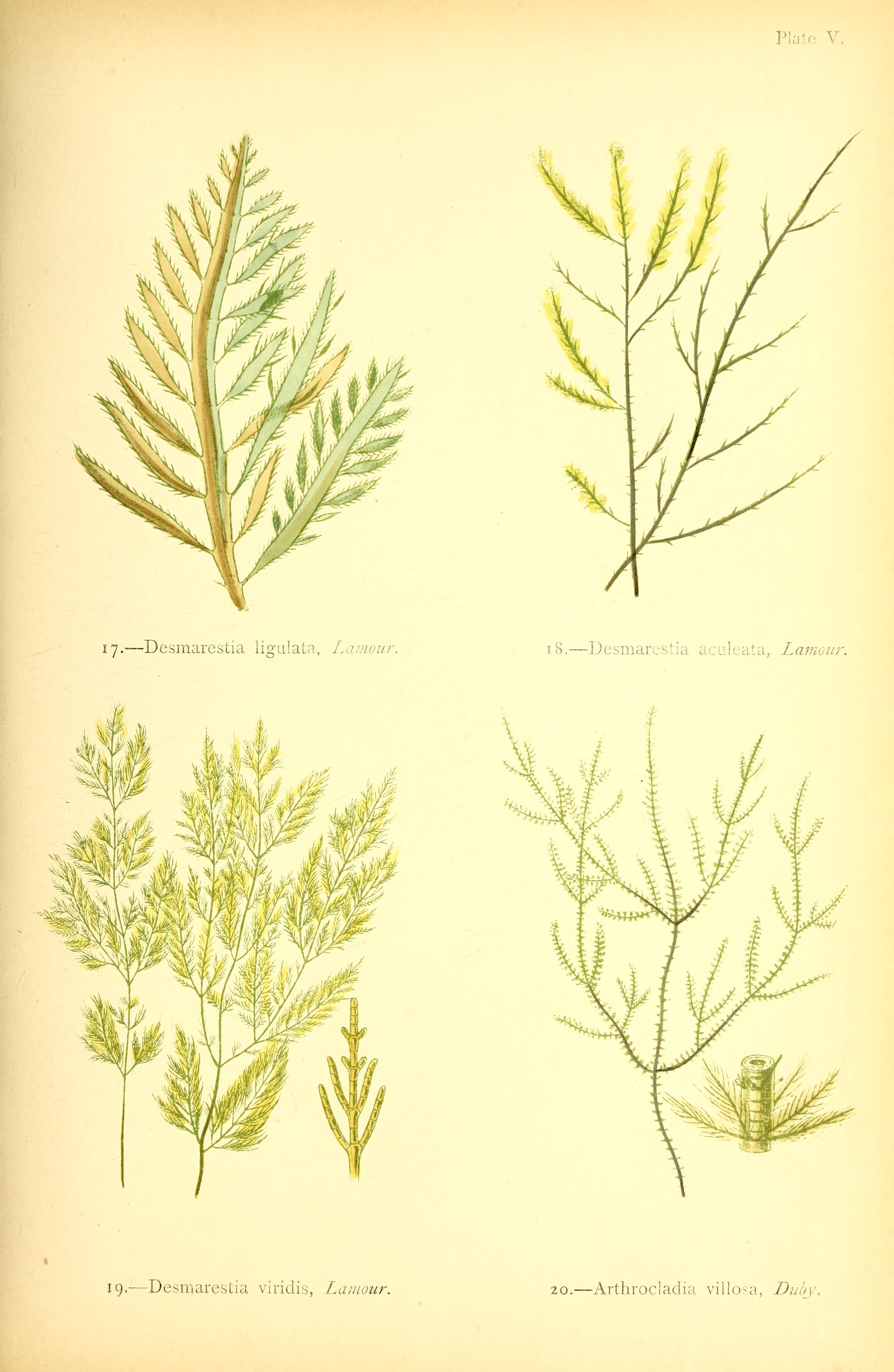
British seaweeds Artist rendition 1872 Desmarestia aculeata figure 18

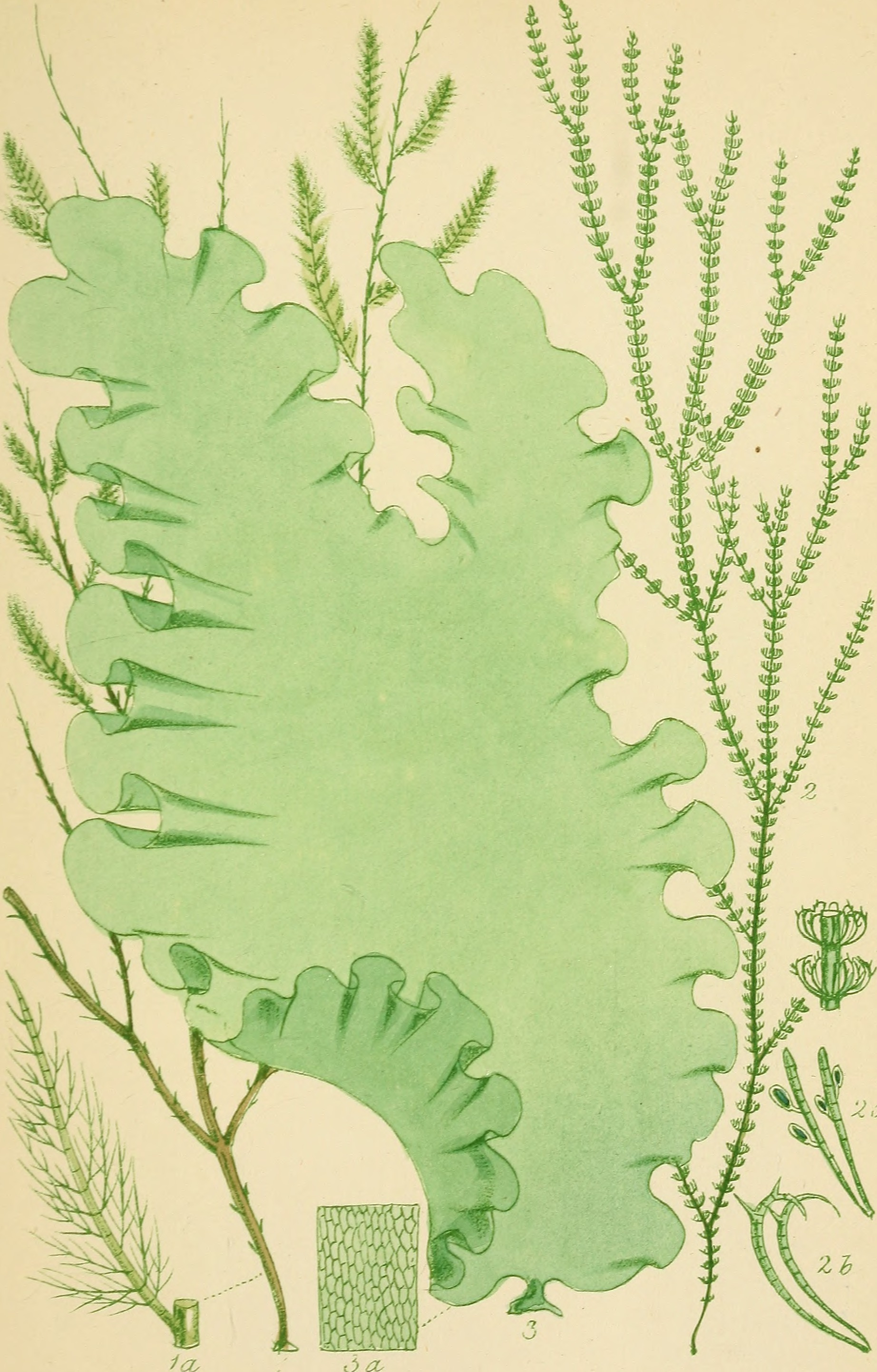
British seaweeds: an introduction to the study of the marine Algae of Great Britain Artist rendition - Desmarestia aculeata figure 1a

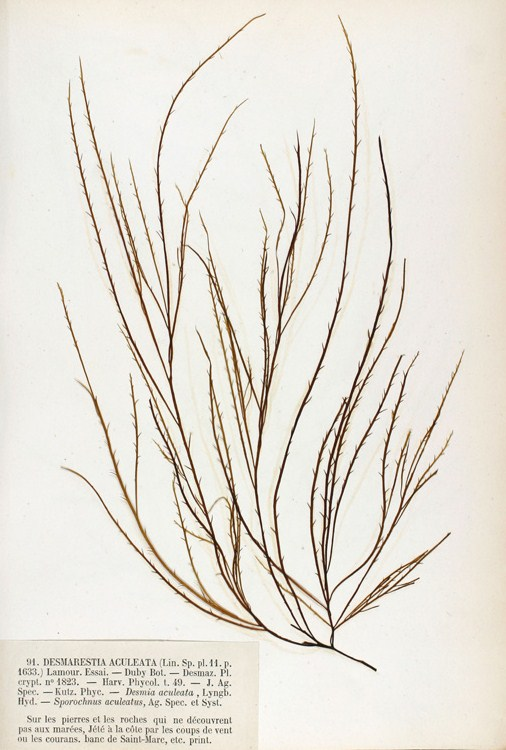
Collected and pressed sample 1852

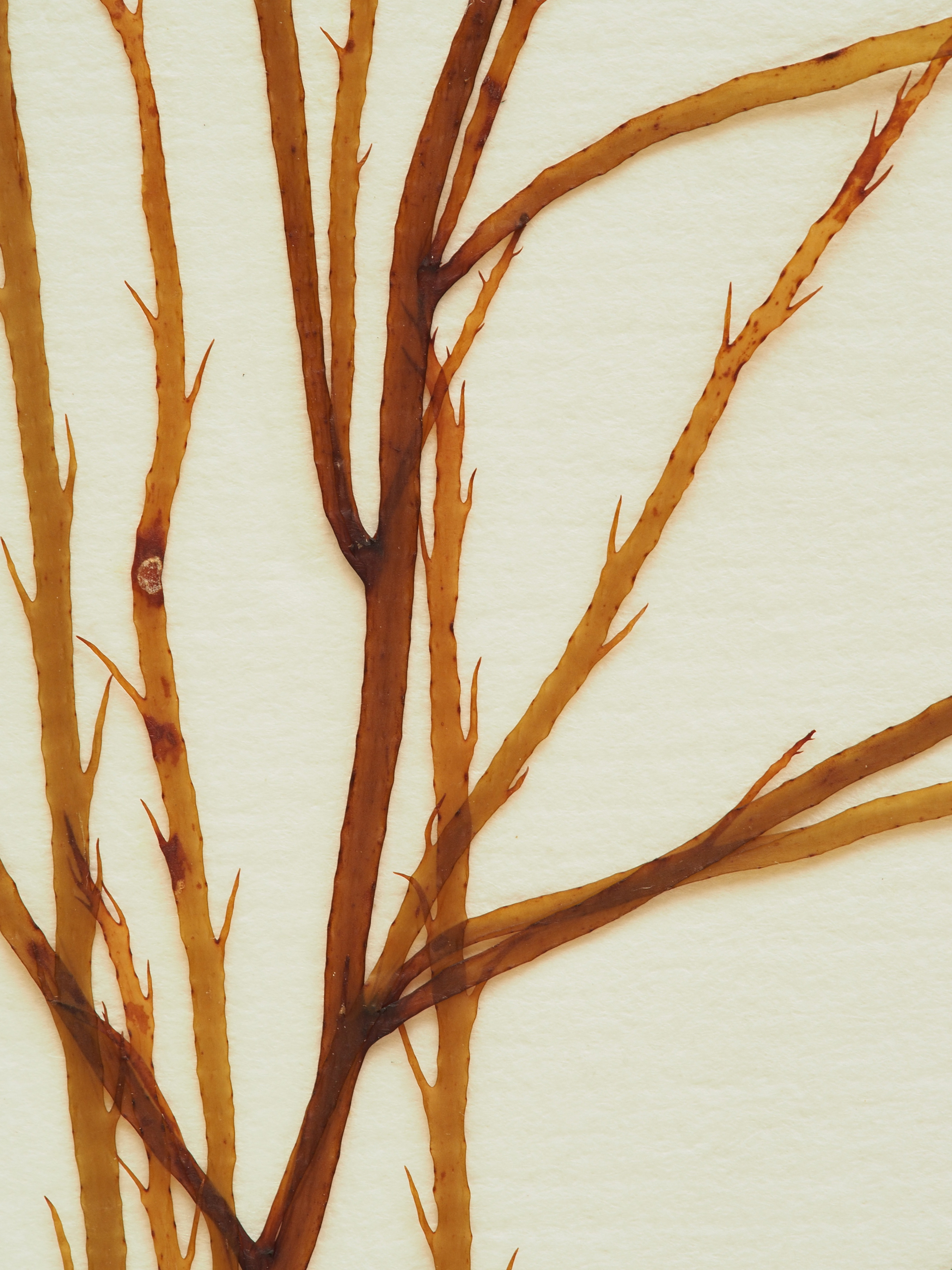
Close-up of sample 1988
