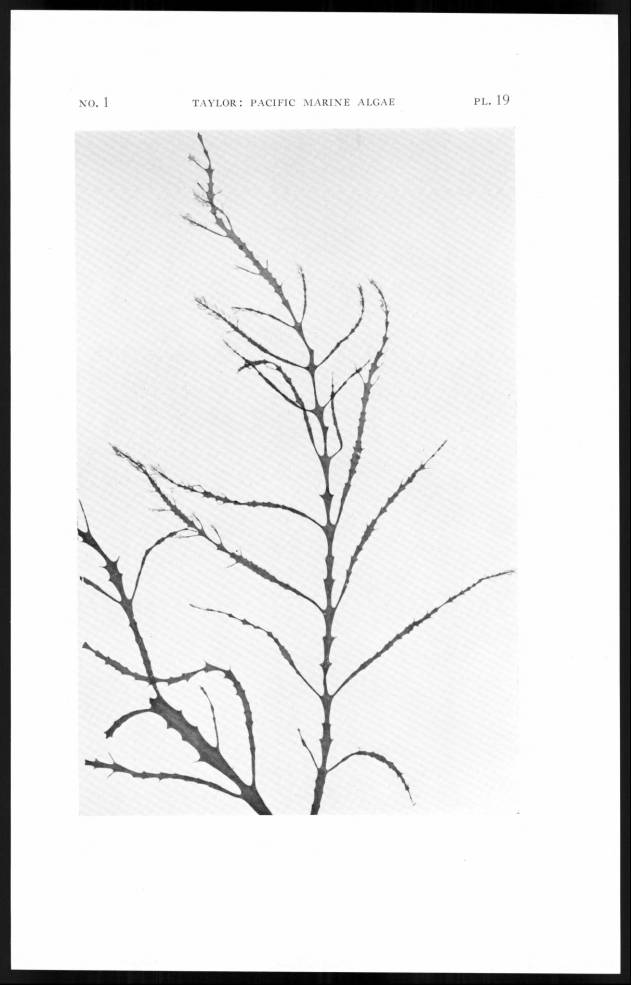
- Desmarestia tropica A small portion of a branch tip to show the serration, the young branchlets, and the hair tufts on the teeth near the tips. In most collections the hair tufts have been lost, probably by damage due to the inevitably rough handling resulting from dredging.

Conservation status
- Critically endangered, possibly extinct (IUCN 3.1)

Scientific classification
- Domain: Eukaryota
- Clade: Sar
- Clade: Stramenopiles
- Division: Ochrophyta
- Class: Phaeophyceae
- Order: Desmarestiales
- Family: Desmarestiaceae
- Genus: Desmarestia
- Species: D. tropica

Binomial name
- Desmarestia tropica W. R. Taylor, 1945

= Desmarestia tropica =

Species of seaweed

Desmarestia tropica, sometimes called tropical acidweed, is a species of seaweed in the family Desmarestiaceae. It is critically endangered, possibly extinct, and one of only fifteen protists evaluated by IUCN. Endemic to the Galápagos Islands, the specific epithet tropica alludes to its tropical habitat, rare for members of Desmarestiales. The common name acidweed applies to members of the genus Desmarestia, generally characterized by fronds containing vacuoles of concentrated sulfuric acid, but it is unclear if this species also produces acid.

== History ==
D. tropica was first collected by William Randolph Taylor on 19 January 1935, and twice more later that month. He published a description of the species ten years later in May 1945. The organism was last collected in 1972, and not seen since despite efforts to search the sighted locations and other possible habitats in the archipelago. Because of its preference for deep, cold water in a tropical location, it was likely severely affected by El Niño, especially the 1982–83 El Niño event. This event killed much of the macroalgae in the area, and D. tropica likely declined from overgrazing by herbivores resulting from El Niño and overfishing of predator fish. There is a small possibility that the species still lives in deeper water in a cryptic gametophyte stage, but if so it has yet to return to the more visible sporophyte stage. The gametophyte has also never been observed.

== Description ==
The thallus of D. tropica can be about 40 centimetres (16 in) tall and is soft, bushy, and light brown in color. The holdfast is tiny and not very differentiated. The stipe is 3 millimetres (0.12 in) in diameter and short, fleshy, and firm. It continues up as the rachis where it flattens out, only visible underneath the blade, and widens to 5–8 millimetres (0.20–0.31 in). Opposite branching starts 1–2 centimetres (0.39–0.79 in) from the base with wide-angled branches every 1–3 centimetres (0.39–1.18 in), and continues from each branch for several degrees. The blades have short, broad teeth which on the younger blades include short brown filaments. These filaments are oppositely branched.

D. tropica differs from D. latifrons by being more bushy and having more of a gradation in branches from the apex to the base. The branches are also more expansive in D. tropica than in D. latifrons or similar species. D. tropica is in the section Herbacea of Desmarestia, but compared to other North American species it is less membranous.

== Habitat ==
Tropical acidweed has been found in only two locations: Post Office Bay off Floreana Island and Caleta Tagus (Tagus Cove) off Isabela Island. At the former site it was found at depths from 14–60 metres (46–197 ft). It was once thought to be found off the mainland coast of Peru, but these specimens are considered instead to be D. firma.

Despite its tropical range, it prefers the cold, deep water of upwelling areas of the lower sublittoral zone.
