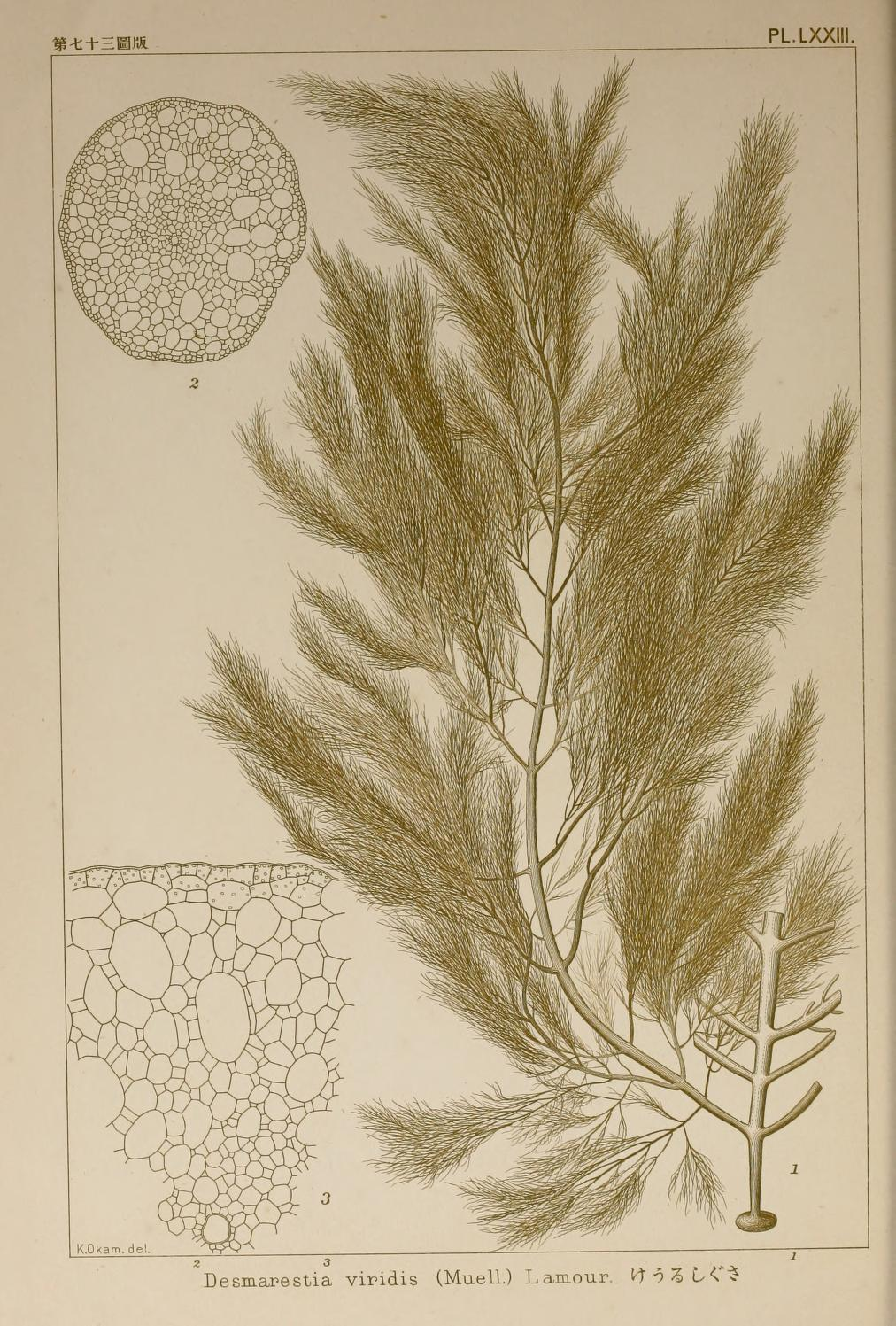

Scientific classification
- Domain: Eukaryota
- Clade: Sar
- Clade: Stramenopiles
- Phylum: Ochrophyta
- Class: Phaeophyceae
- Order: Desmarestiales
- Family: Desmarestiaceae
- Genus: Desmarestia
- Species: D. viridis

Binomial name
- Desmarestia viridis (O.F.Müller) J.V.Lamouroux

Synonyms
- Chordaria viridis (O.F.Müller) C.Agardh, 1817; Desmarestia pacifica Setchell & N.L.Gardner, 1924; Dichloria viridis (O.F.Müller) Greville, 1830; Fucus viridis O.F.Müller, 1782; Gigartina viridis (O.F.Müller) Lyngbye, 1819; Iridea fluitans Stackhouse, 1816; Sporochnus viridis (O.F.Müller) Greville, 1830

= Desmarestia viridis =

Species of alga

Desmarestia viridis is a species of brown algae and a member of the phylum Ochrophyta. It is also known as stringy acid kelp, and is the most acidic of the acid kelps with a vacuolar pH of about 1. It is best known for releasing sulfuric acid when damaged, usually destroying itself and other nearby marine plant life. Desmarestia viridis is typically found in colder, shallow, intertidal zones all around the world.

== Physical description ==
This algal species can grow up to 48 inches tall. It is made up of a disk-like holdfast to attach itself to the substrate, protecting the plant from getting swept away due to wave energy. It has a cylindrical center and its fronds have a signature pattern of opposite branching which can resemble the branches of a bush. It is the color brown, rather than green like many other types of algae, due to the pigment fucoxanthin dominating and masking the other pigments.

== Reproduction ==
Desmarestia viridis, like all brown algae, can do both asexual and sexual reproduction. Brown algae reproduces by means of gametes and flagellated spores and the life cycle consists of two stages. At first, the algae exist as the flagellated spores. These are released from the parent, get fertilized, and then settle on the substrate. This begins the second stage of life. The algae grows into a mature plant and then releases spores, continuing the cycle.

== Habitat and distribution ==
Desmarestia viridis has been found in nearly every ocean across the globe, with the only exception being the Indian Ocean. However, Desmarestia viridis is very common around Ireland, Great Britain, and the Isle of Man, and like most brown algae species, tends to prefer cooler climates. Its preferred habitat is on hard rock substrates in the subtidal to intertidal zones and can sustain life in both protected and exposed habitats. It survives best in the intertidal because the shallow depth allows the plant the access to sunlight to perform photosynthesis.

== Ecological role ==
Desmarestia viridis is a primary producer, and like all other algae species, produces its own food via photosynthesis. Brown algae does contain chlorophyll, however the majority of their photosynthetic production is from the pigment fucoxanthin. Fucoxanthin reflects yellow light, and absorbs the sunlight and then transfers this energy along to the chlorophyll to process.

An interesting correlation researchers have looked into is the relationship between D. viridis and the Green Sea Urchin species Strongylocentrotus droebachiensis. One study conducted in Norway looked specifically at the effect of D. viridis on S. droebachiensis distribution and grazing patterns in the field, as well as a lab experiment to determine the effect of the sulphuric acid released from D. viridis on the sea urchin movement. They found that S. droebachiensis densities were one-to-two hundred times lower in areas with high concentrations of kelp than in those with low concentrations. Additionally, they found that the kelp Alaria esculenta that is eaten by S. droebachiensis was consumed less when also in the presence of D. viridis. This implies that the presence of D. viridis has a negative effect on the S. droebachiensis. In the lab experiment, they found that exposing S. droebachiensis to 500 μl water with a pH of 7.5 made them stop moving, while adding just 25 μl of water at pH of 1 (which is the pH of the sulfuric acid that D. viridis releases) made the urchins move in the opposite direction.

== Photos ==
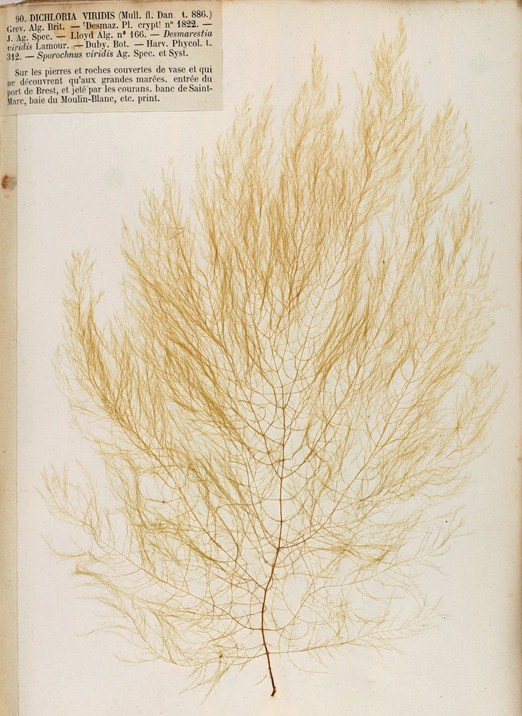
Sketch drawing of Desmarestia viridis

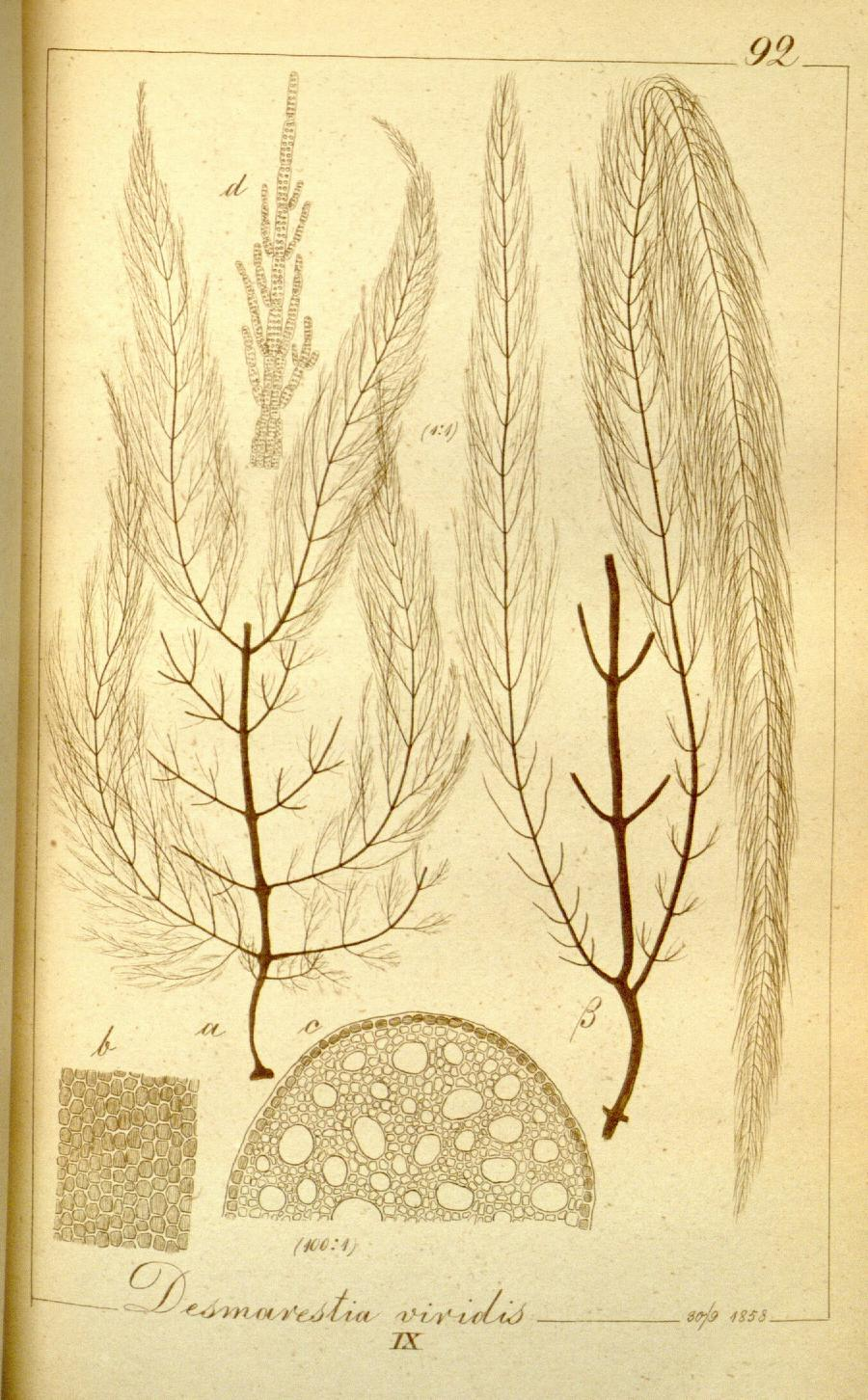
Drawings of Desmarestia viridis Nordhausen :Gedruckt auf kosten des verfassers (in commission bei W. Köhne),1845-71.

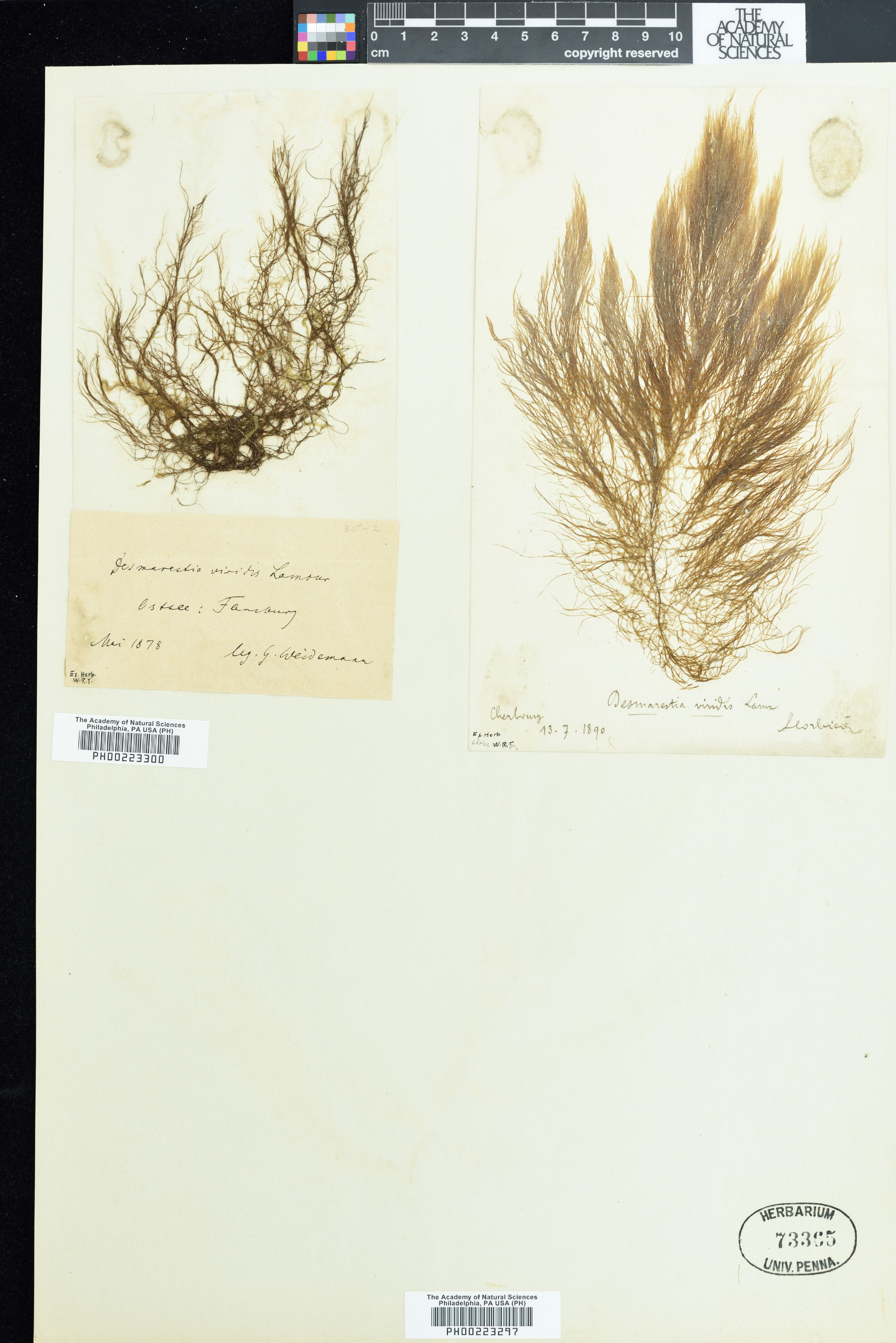
Desmarestia viridis. Specimen on top left corner of sheet, Ex Herb W. R. Taylor Collected and Pressed

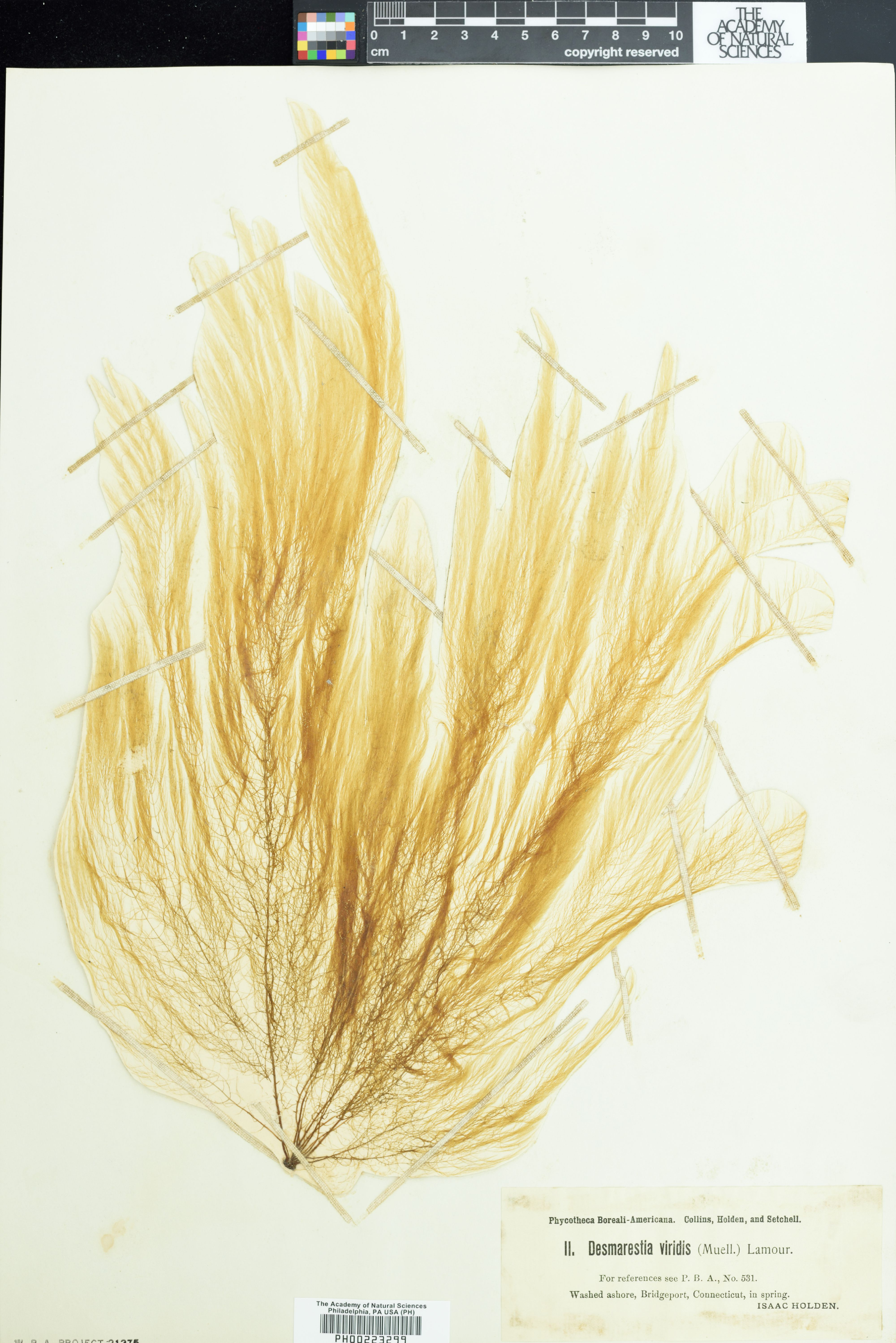
Phycotheca Boreali-Americana, a collection of dried specimens of the Algae of North America

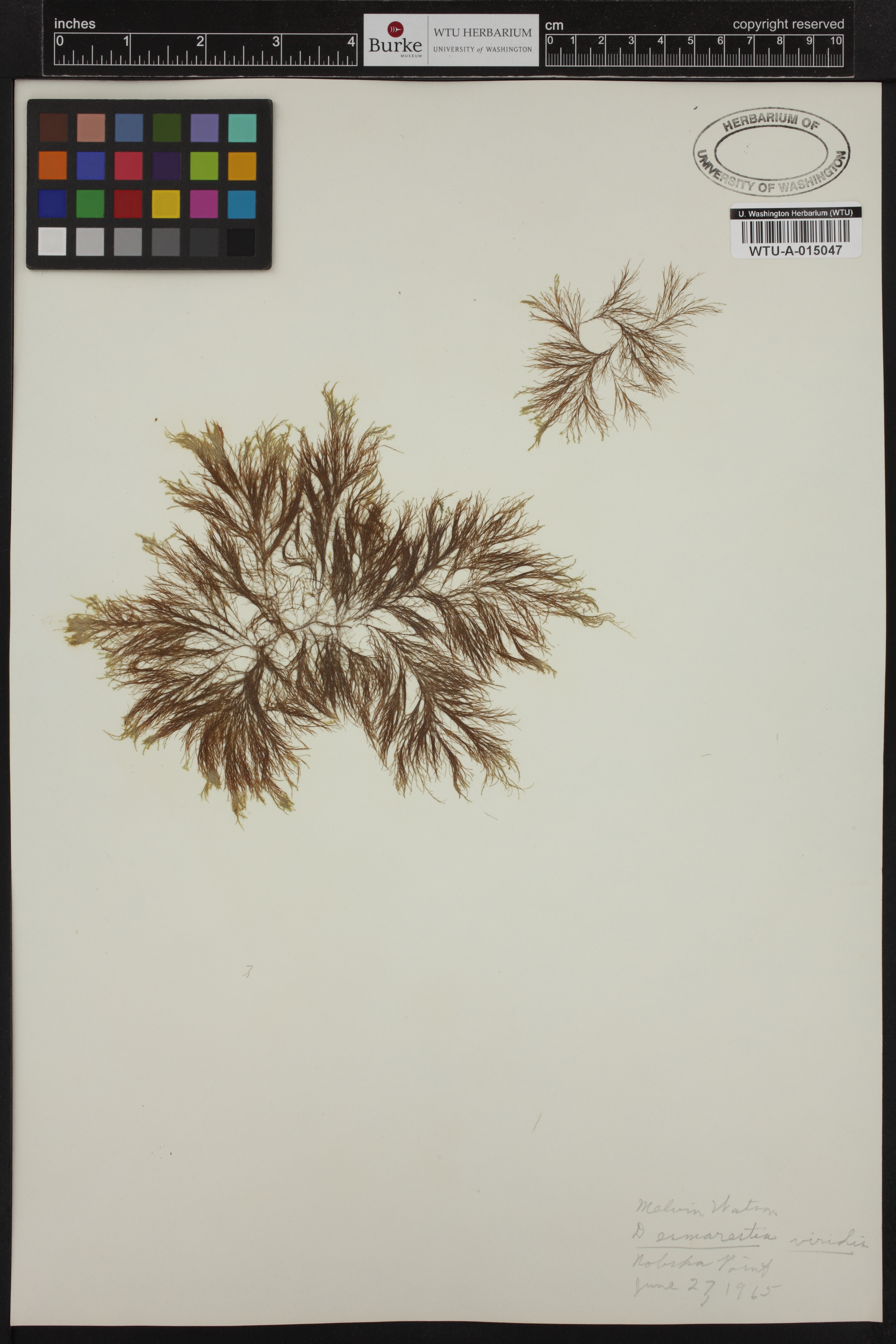
Collected and pressed samples 1965

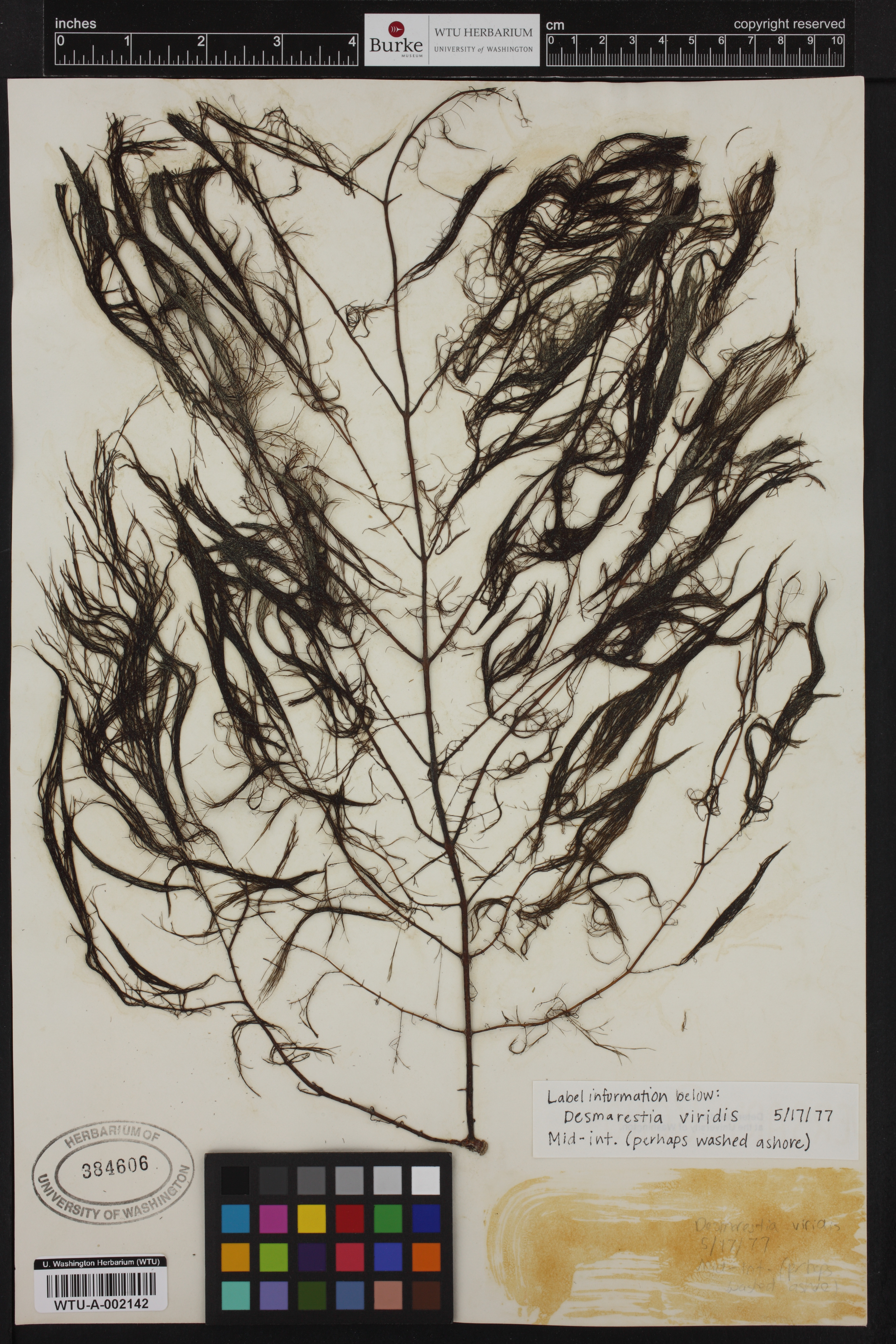
Collected and pressed sample 1977

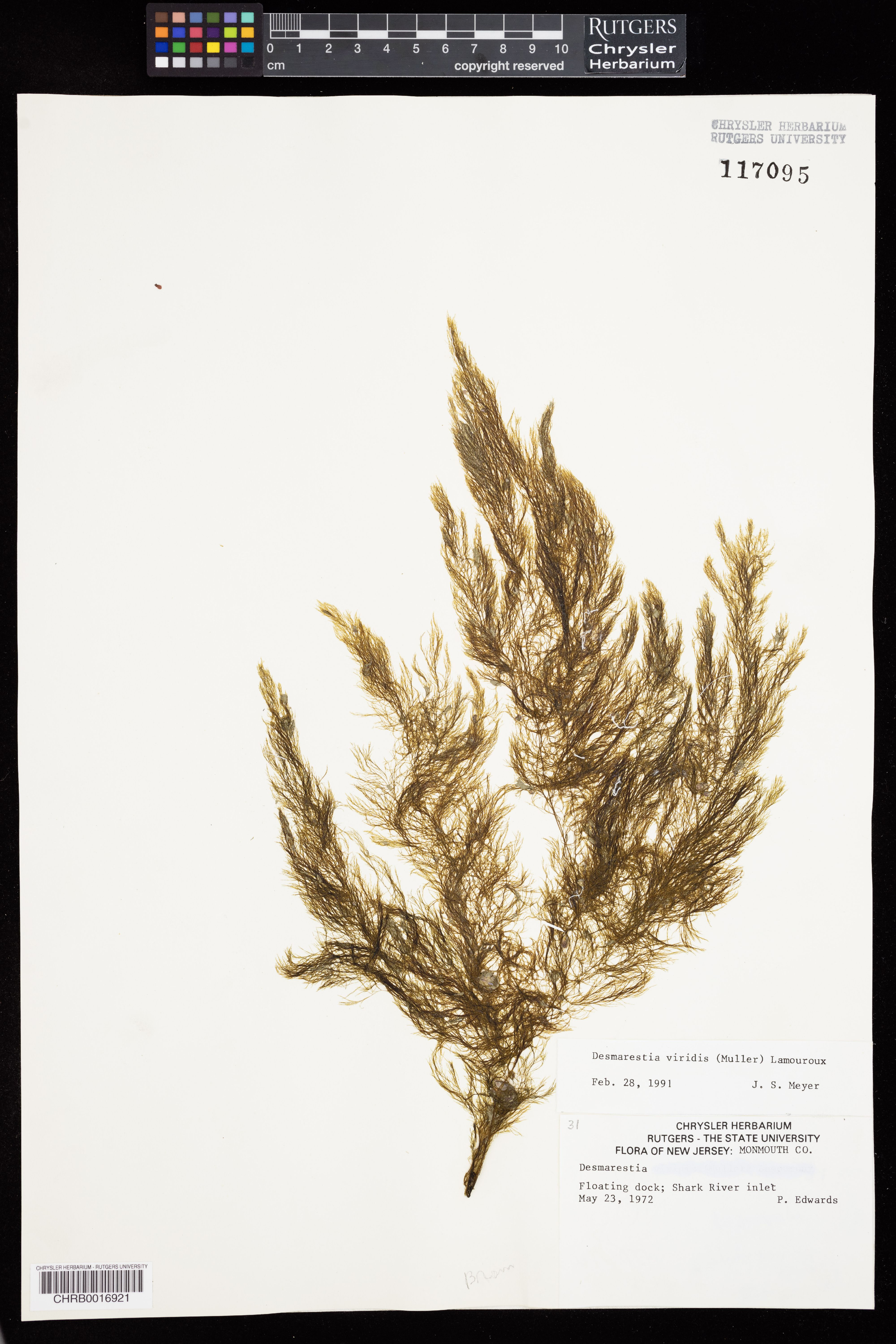
Collected and pressed sample 1972
