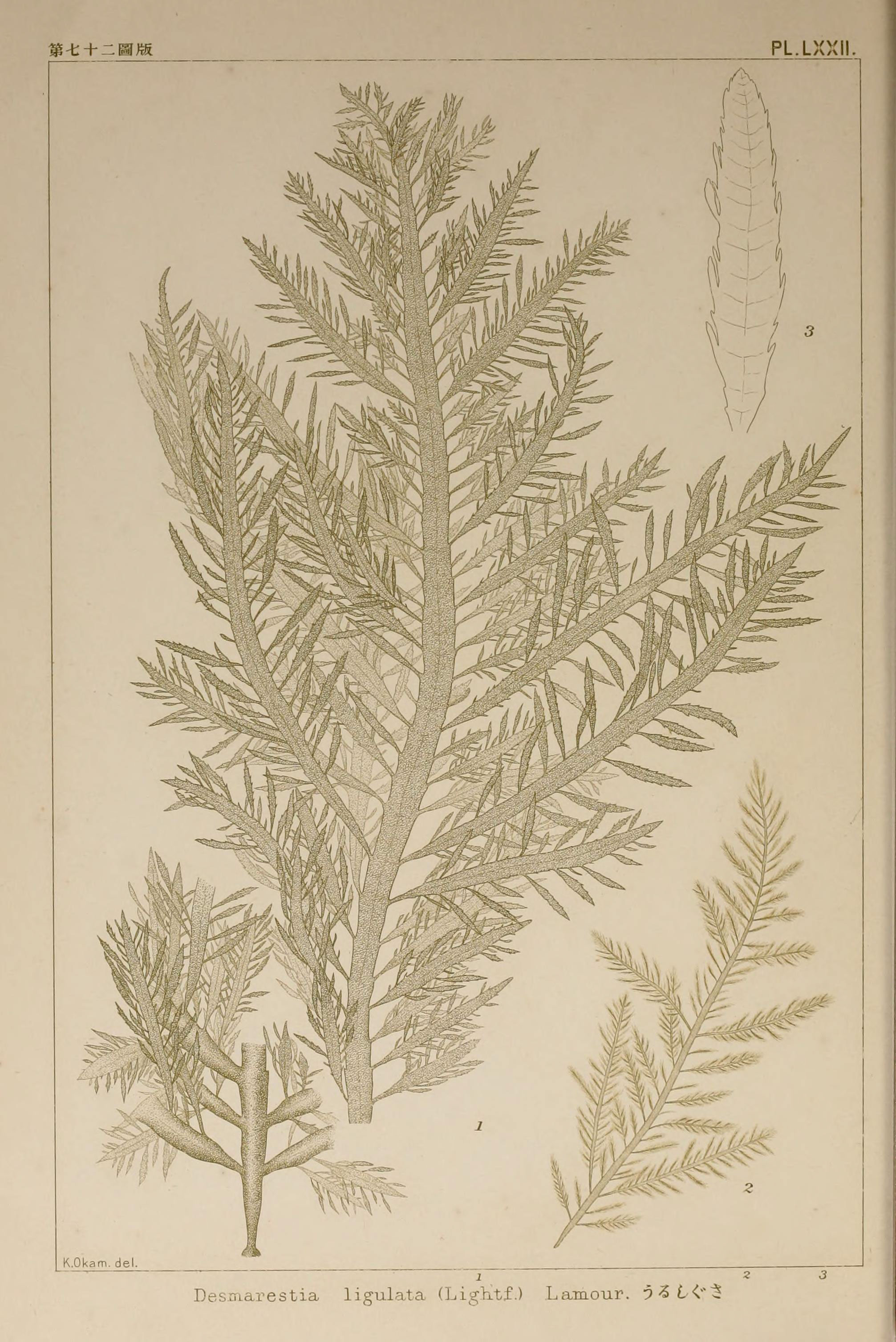

Scientific classification
- Domain: Eukaryota
- Clade: Diaphoretickes
- Clade: SAR
- Clade: Stramenopiles
- Phylum: Gyrista
- Subphylum: Ochrophytina
- Class: Phaeophyceae
- Order: Desmarestiales
- Family: Desmarestiaceae
- Genus: Desmarestia
- Species: D. ligulata

Binomial name
- Desmarestia ligulata (Stackh.) J.V.Lamouroux

= Desmarestia ligulata =

Species of alga

Desmarestia ligulata is a species of brown algae found worldwide. Its common names include color changer, Desmarest's flattened weed, and sea sorrel, though the last name can also refer to other species of Desmarestia.

== Habitat ==
This species is found between the low intertidal to subtidal zones on open coasts. It is the most abundant marine algae associated with giant kelp forests.

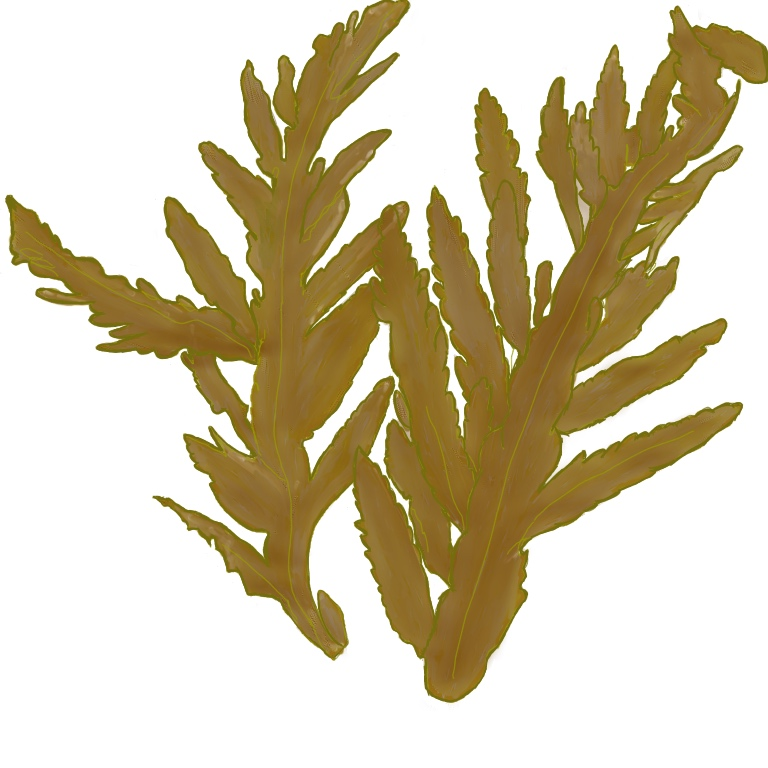
Artistic rendering of D. ligulata

== Acid accumulation ==
Desmarestia ligulata is known for its ability to accumulate high levels of sulfuric acid in its vacuoles. This accumulation appears to be active and permanent, occurring during cell growth and division while unaffected by light regimes or external nutrient profiles. It has been suggested that this acid accumulation is an evolutionary adaptation to discourage grazing by fish and invertebrates.
