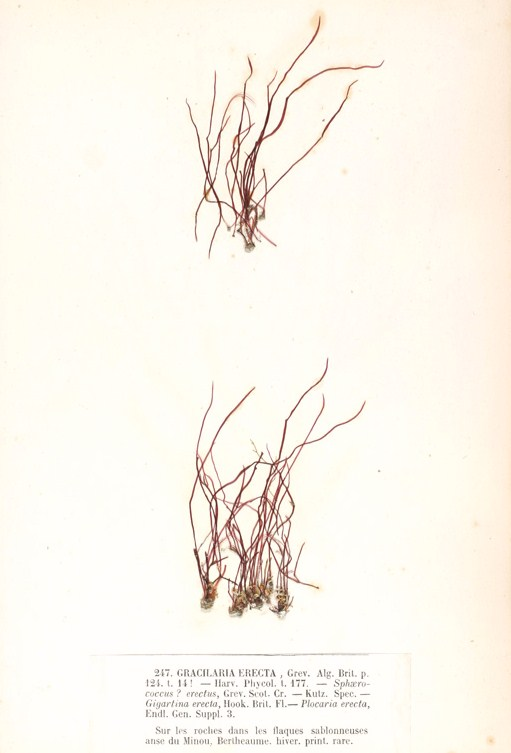
- Cordylecladia erecta

Scientific classification
- Clade: Archaeplastida
- Division: Rhodophyta
- Class: Florideophyceae
- Order: Rhodymeniales
- Family: Rhodymeniaceae
- Genus: Cordylecladia; J.Agardh, 1852

= Cordylecladia =

Genus of algae

Cordylecladia is a genus of red algae belonging to the family Rhodymeniaceae.

The species of this genus are found in Europe, Northern America and Australia.

Species:

- Cordylecladia andersonii Grunow
- Cordylecladia erecta (Greville) J.Agardh
- Cordylecladia guiryi Gargiulo, G.Furnari & Cormaci, 1990
