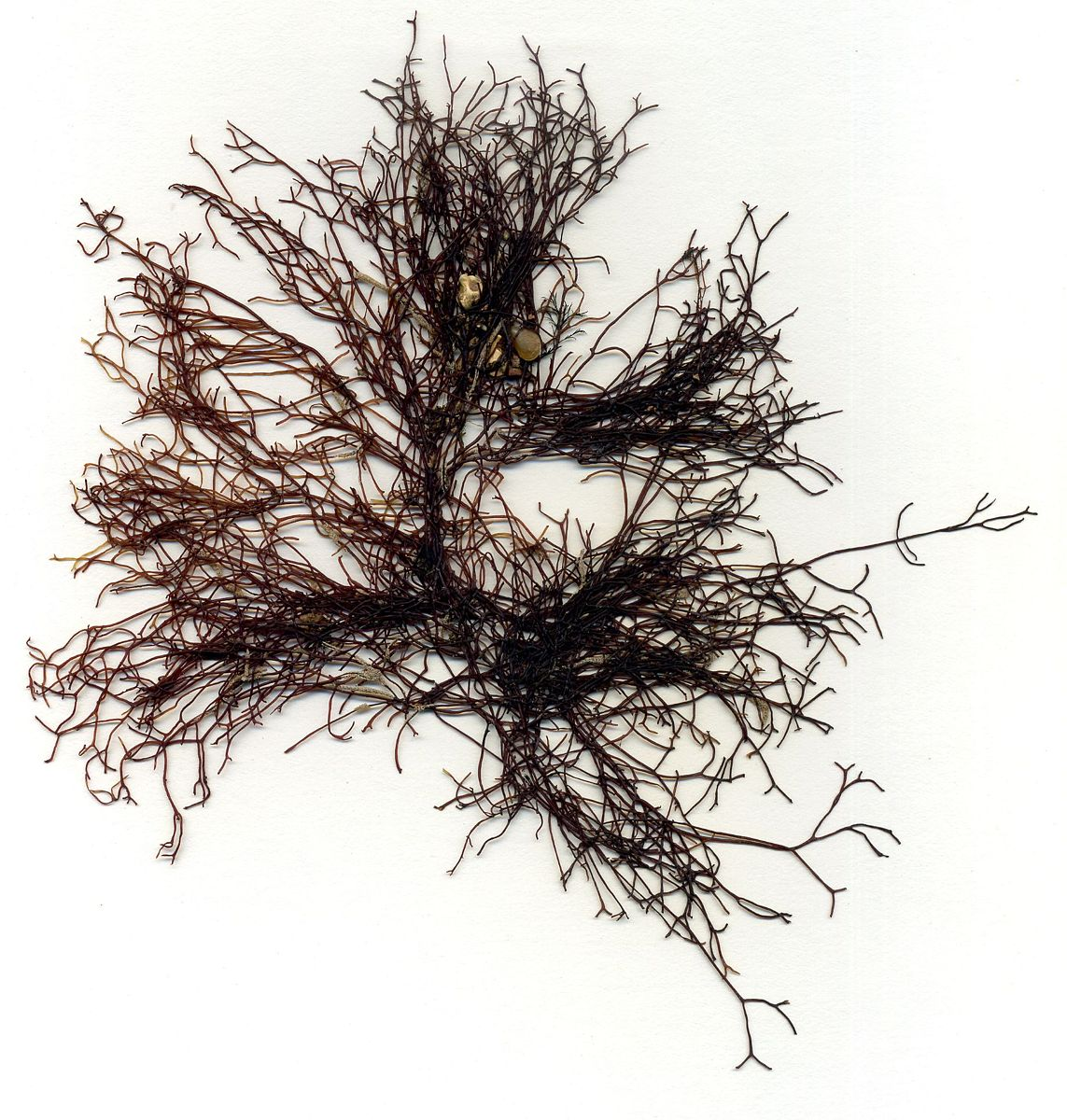
- Ahnfeltia plicata

Scientific classification
- Domain: Eukaryota
- Clade: Archaeplastida
- Division: Rhodophyta
- Class: Florideophyceae
- Order: Ahnfeltiales
- Family: Ahnfeltiaceae
- Genus: Ahnfeltia; E.M.Fries, 1836

= Ahnfeltia =

Genus of algae

Ahnfeltia is a genus of red algae.

The type species is Ahnfeltia plicata. Some other species of this genus:

- Ahnfeltia setacea
- Ahnfeltia svensonii
- Ahnfeltia tobuchiensis
- Ahnfeltia torulosa
