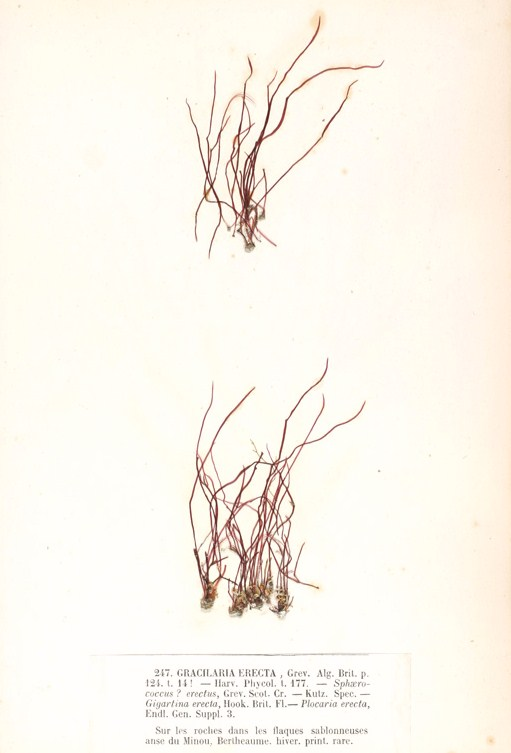

Scientific classification
- Domain: Eukaryota
- Clade: Archaeplastida
- Division: Rhodophyta
- Class: Florideophyceae
- Order: Rhodymeniales
- Family: Rhodymeniaceae
- Genus: Cordylecladia
- Species: C. erecta

Binomial name
- Cordylecladia erecta (Greville) J. Agardh, 1852

Synonyms
- Gracilaria erecta (Greville) Greville, 1830; Sphaerococcus erectus Greville, 1828

= Cordylecladia erecta =

Species of alga

Cordylecladia erecta is a species of red algae in the family Rhodymeniaceae. It is found in the north east Atlantic Ocean and the Mediterranean Sea and is the type species of the genus.

== Description ==
Cordylecladia erecta grows in small tufts from a disc-like, rhizoidal, crustose base attached to rock but often hidden beneath the sand. It has tough reddish-brown cylindrical fronds that grow to 10 cm (4 in). These are solid, either unbranched or sparsely branched dichotomously and taper to points. The reproductive structures are only visible in winter and appear as enlarged, spindle-shaped areas near the ends of the fronds. This seaweed could be confused with Ahnfeltia plicata but that species is more bushy with wiry fronds that branch irregularly and are only 1 mm (0.04 in) in diameter.

== Distribution and habitat ==
Cordylecladia erecta occurs in the eastern Atlantic Ocean and the Mediterranean Sea. Its range extends from the Shetland Islands southwards but in the British Isles it is mostly found on the south and west coasts. It is found on the lower shore and subtidally, on rocks covered with sand.

== Biology ==
The life cycle of Cordylecladia erecta involves an alternation of generations with both sexual and asexual phases. Male gametophyte plants have spermatangial sori that form pod-like structures 4 to 7 mm (0.16 to 0.28 in) long close to the tips of the fronds. Female plants are recognisable by bunches of sterile hairs that develop first near the tips of the fronds and later extend to most of the rest of the frond. Carpogonia develop on short curved branches among these hairs. These structures liberate gametes into the water and after fertilisation, the zygotes settle to the seabed. Tetrasporophyte plants develop from these and are at first indistinguishable from the gametophytes but when they become mature they develop spindle-shaped structures at the tips of the fronds measuring up to 5 by 3 mm (0.20 by 0.12 in). These release tetraspores which develop into a new generation of gametophyte plants. It has been shown that the cycle is initiated by the short day conditions existing between October and April.
