= Anselme Gaëtan Desmarest =

French zoologist (1784–1838)

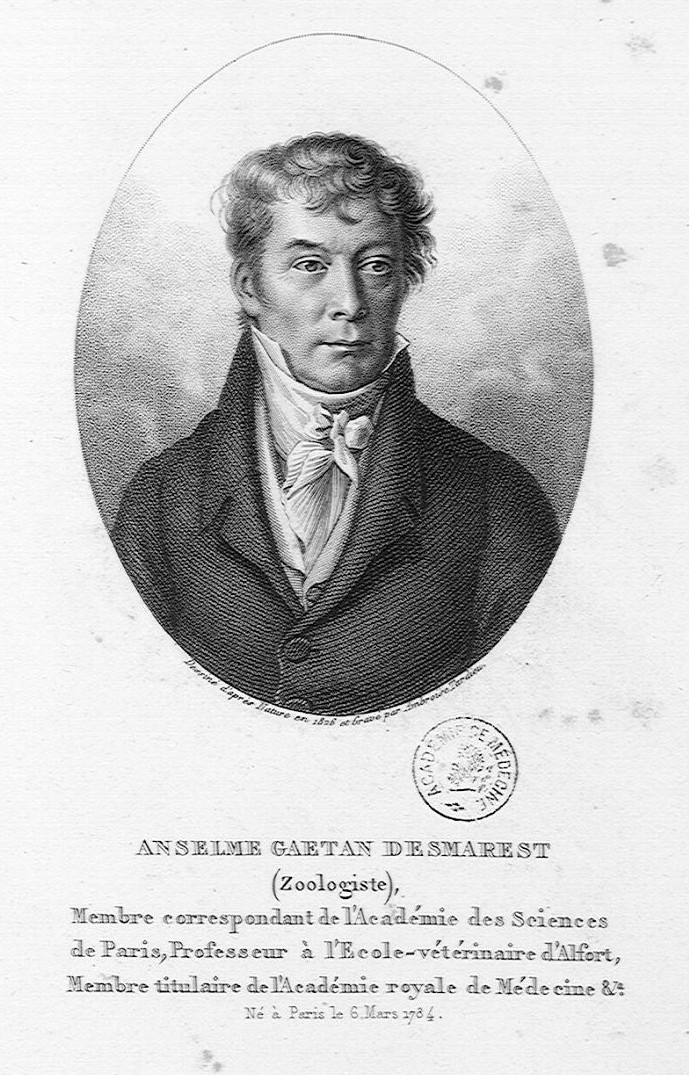
- Born: 6 March 1784
- Died: 4 June 1838 (aged 54)
- Known for: Histoire Naturelle des Tangaras, des Manakins et des Todiers
- Children: Eugène Anselme Sébastien Léon Desmarest
- Father: Nicolas Desmarest
- Scientific career
- Fields: Zoology
- Workplaces: École nationale vétérinaire d'Alfort
- Author abbrev. (zoology): Desmarest

Anselme Gaëtan Desmarest (6 March 1784 – 4 June 1838) was a French zoologist and author. He was the son of Nicolas Desmarest and the father of Eugène Anselme Sébastien Léon Desmarest.

== Career ==
Desmarest was a disciple of Georges Cuvier and Alexandre Brongniart, and in 1815, he succeeded Pierre André Latreille to the professorship of zoology at the École nationale vétérinaire d'Alfort. He was elected to the American Philosophical Society in 1819 and to the Académie Nationale de Médecine in 1820.

== Publications ==
Desmarest published Histoire Naturelle des Tangaras, des Manakins et des Todiers (1805), Considérations générales sur la classe des crustacés (1825), Mammalogie ou description des espèces des Mammifères (1820), and Dictionnaire des Sciences Naturelles (1816–30, with André Marie Constant Duméril). His Mammalogie was significant as it contained a comprehensive list of all mammals known at the time, including living forms and extinct forms known only from fossils. Desmarest was one of the first scientists to routinely apply both genus and species names to animals. Prior to his time, it was common practice to give only a genus name to a new animal.

== Legacy ==
The common name, Desmarest's hutia, honors Anselme Gaëtan Desmarest, who described the species in 1822 under the synonym fourniere.

The brown algae Desmarestia is named in honour of Desmarest, as well as the family (Desmarestiaceae) — and in turn, the order (Desmarestiales) — of which the genus is the type species.
