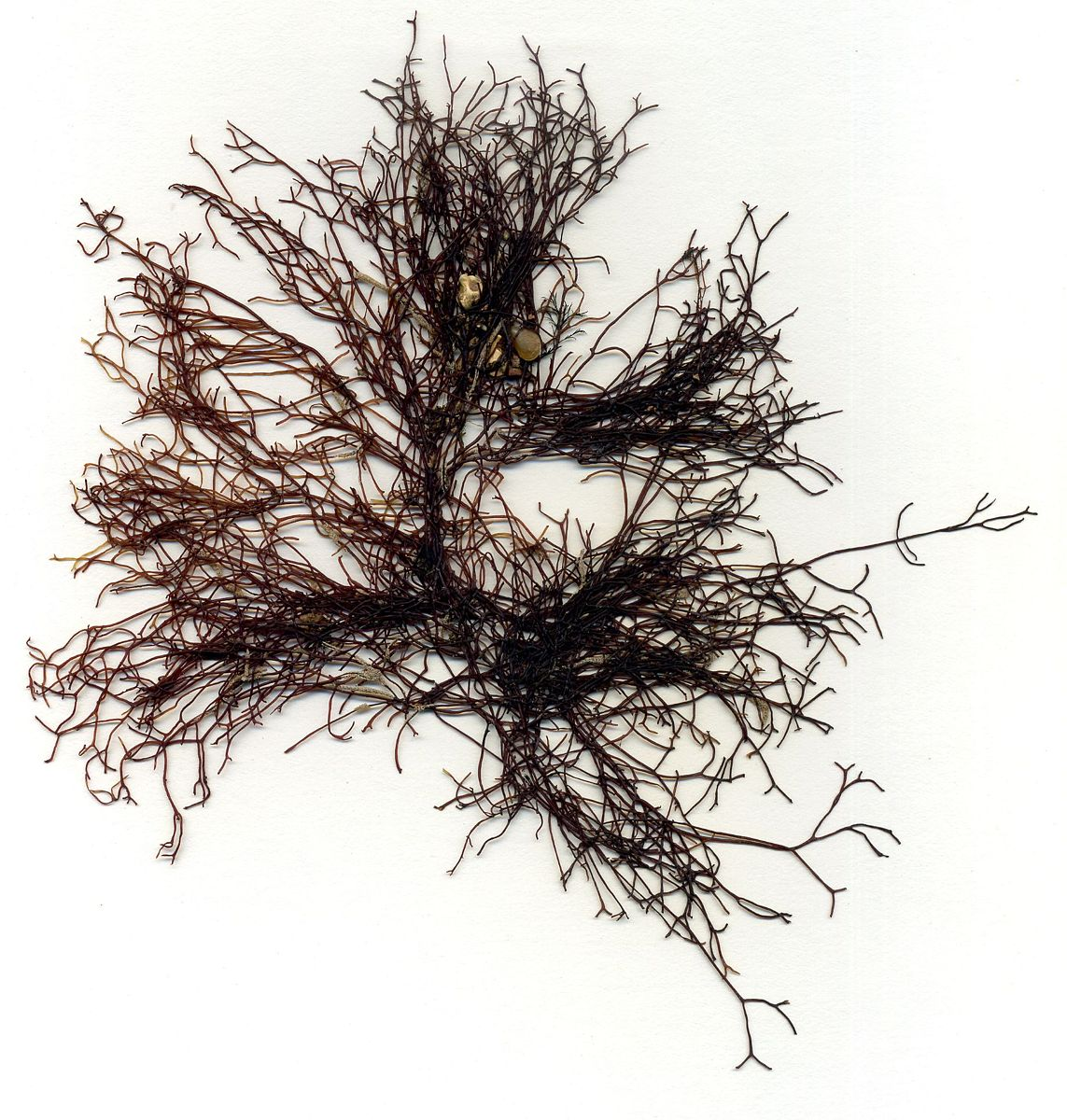
- Ahnfeltia plicata

Scientific classification
- Domain: Eukaryota
- Clade: Archaeplastida
- Division: Rhodophyta
- Class: Florideophyceae
- Subclass: Ahnfeltiophycidae
- Order: Ahnfeltiales; Maggs & Pueschel

= Ahnfeltiales =

Order of algae

Ahnfeltiales is an order of red algae belonging to the class Florideophyceae. The order consists only one family: Ahnfeltiaceae.

Genera:

- Ahnfeltia E.M.Fries
- Porphyrodiscus Batters
- Sterrocolax F.Schmitz
