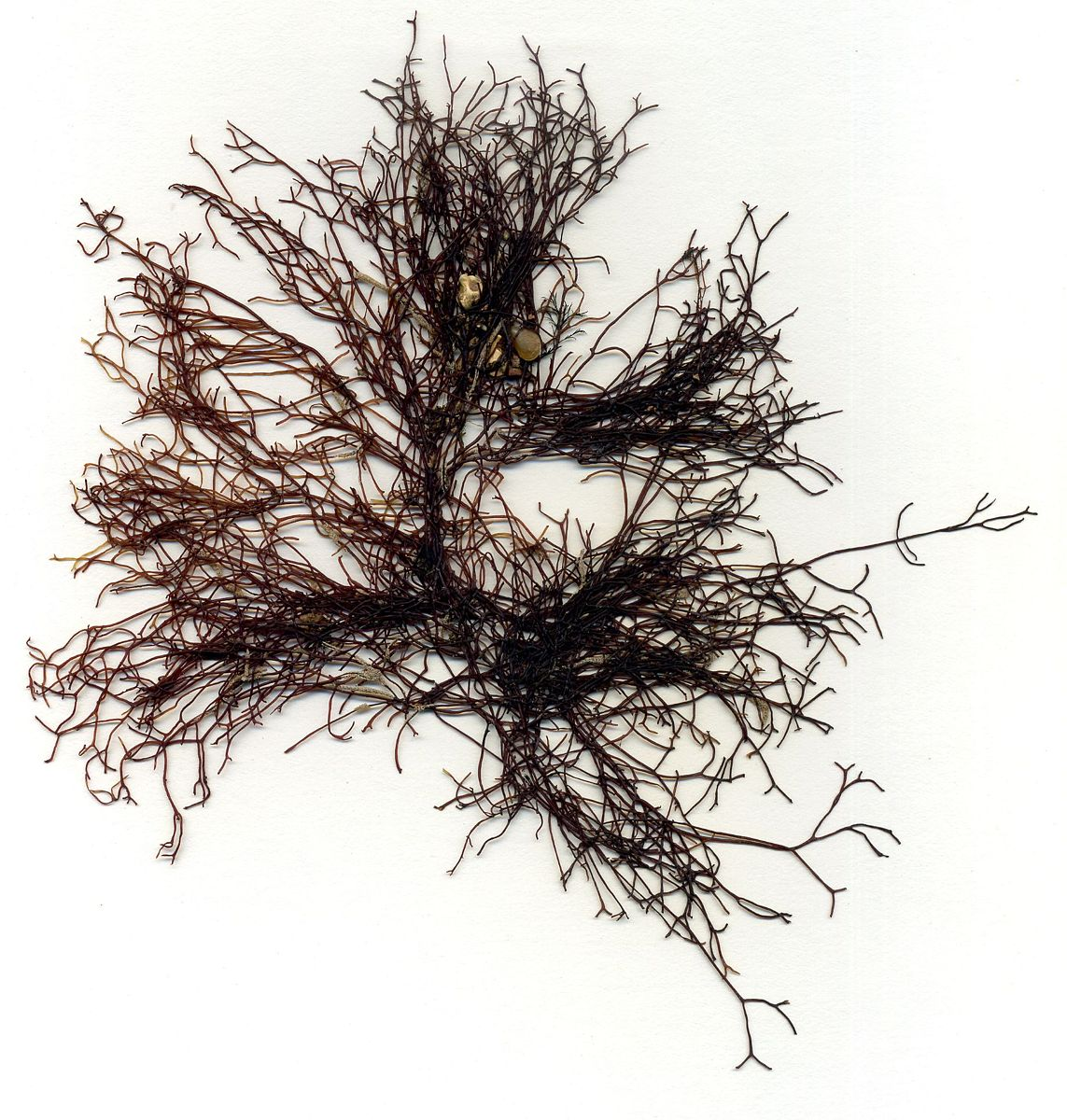
- Ahnfeltia plicata

Scientific classification
- Domain: Eukaryota
- Clade: Archaeplastida
- Division: Rhodophyta
- Class: Florideophyceae
- Order: Ahnfeltiales
- Family: Ahnfeltiaceae
- Genus: Ahnfeltia
- Species: A. plicata

Binomial name
- Ahnfeltia plicata (Hudson) E.M.Fries, 1836

Synonyms
- Fucus albus Hudson, 1762; Fucus plicatus Hudson, 1762; Gigartina confervoides var. plicata (Esper) Lyngbye, 1819; Gigartina plicata (Hudson) J.V.Lamouroux; Gymnogongrus comosus Kützing, 1869; Gymnogongrus plicatus (Hudson) Kützing; Porphyrodiscus simulans Batters, 1897; Sphaerococcus plicatus (Hudson) C.Agardh, 1817; Sterrocolax decipiens F.Schmitz, 1893; Tylocarpus plicatus (Hudson) Kützing, 1843

= Ahnfeltia plicata =

Species of alga

Ahnfeltia plicata, the landlady's wig, is a species of red alga in the family Ahnfeltiaceae. It grows in northern parts of the Atlantic Ocean.

== Description ==
The landlady's wig forms tufted perennial plants with wiry fronds, branching from a discoid holdfast. The cylindrical fronds branch and are terete, they branch irregularly in a dichotomous manner. Each plant is about 15 cm (6 in) tall and 10 cm (4 in) wide. The holdfast is up to 2.5 cm (1 in) wide and composed of a thin layer encrusting the rock substrate. The frond's reddish-black colour results from the red pigments phycoerythrin and phycocyanin. Their colour is so intense that it masks the presence of other pigments, chlorophyll a and beta-Carotene. Some unique xanthophylls are also present in this seaweed. The landlady's wig could be confused with Cordylecladia erecta but that species is less common and is thicker with more rigid, regularly branched fronds.

== Distribution and habitat ==
The landlady's wig is found on either side of the north Atlantic Ocean from the middle shore down to depths of about 12 metres (39 ft). It grows on hard surfaces and is common on rock covered with sand and also occurs in rock pools. It is sometimes torn from the rock in storms, resulting in floating mats of weed. The base of the fronds continue to grow even when they are detached from their holdfasts.

== Biology ==
The landlady's wig is a slow-growing species that may survive for five to ten years. It has different forms at different stages of its life cycle. On male plants there are spermatangial sori that form swellings on the middle parts of the frond. On female plants there are gametangial sori which are up to 5 millimetres (0.20 in) long. After fertilization of the carpogonium, carpospores are formed on the female frond. These produce a second diploid generation, giving rise to a tetrasporophyte form that often encrusts pebbles. This produces tetraspores which develop into new gametophyte plants. The encrusting tetrasporophyte form is known as Porphyrodiscus simulans.

== Uses ==
The landlady's wig is an edible seaweed and was used in the Soviet Union for the production of agar. It can also be eaten raw or cooked and is said to have a crunchy texture and pleasant taste.
