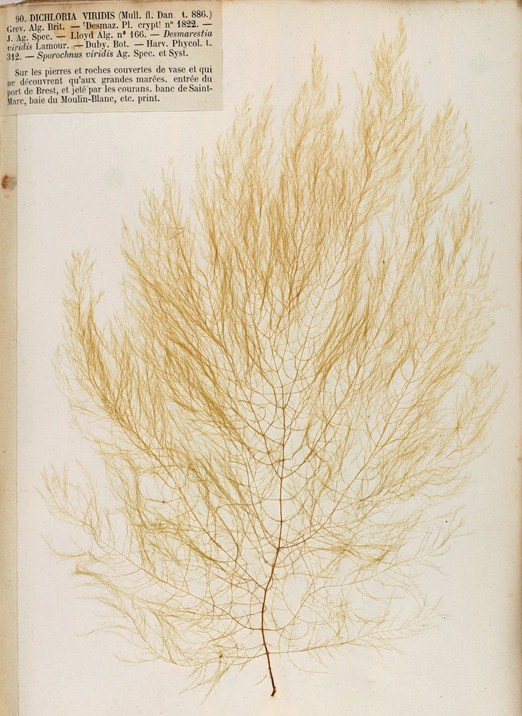
- Desmarestia viridis

Scientific classification
- Domain: Eukaryota
- Clade: Sar
- Clade: Stramenopiles
- Division: Ochrophyta
- Class: Phaeophyceae
- Order: Desmarestiales
- Family: Desmarestiaceae
- Genus: Desmarestia; J.V.Lamouroux, 1813

Type species
- Desmarestia aculeata (L.) J.V.Lamouroux

= Desmarestia =

Genus of brown algae

Desmarestia, also known as acid weed, acid kelp, acidweed, sea sorrel, mermaid's hair, and landlady's wig is a genus of brown algae found worldwide. However, 'sea sorrel' can also specifically refer to Desmarestia viridis. Members of this genus can be either annual or perennial. Annual members of this genus store sulfuric acid in intracellular vacuoles. When exposed to air they release the acid, thereby destroying themselves and nearby seaweeds in the process. They are found in shallow intertidal zones.

Ingesting sulfuric acid can cause severe digestive disturbances, but since sulfuric acid tastes extremely sour, members of the genus are unlikely to be eaten in harmful quantities.

The genus was named in honor of Anselme Gaëtan Desmarest.

== Species ==
AlgaeBase lists 32 currently accepted species within the genus Desmarestia, not including variations and subspecies.

- Desmarestia aculeata (L.) J.V.Lamouroux - Type specimen for the genus
- Desmarestia anceps (Montagne)
- Desmarestia antarctica (R.L.Moe & P.C.Silva)
- Desmarestia chordalis (J.D.Hooker & Harvey)
- Desmarestia confervoides (Bory de Saint-Vincent) M.E.Ramírez & A.F.Peters
- Desmarestia distans (C.Agardh) J.Agardh
- Desmarestia dudresnayi J.V.Lamouroux ex Léman
- Desmarestia farcta Setchell & Gardner
- Desmarestia filamentosa E.Y.Dawson
- Desmarestia firma (C.Agardh) Skottsberg
- Desmarestia foliacea V.A.Pease
- Desmarestia gayana Montagne
- Desmarestia herbacea (Turner) J.V.Lamouroux
- Desmarestia inanis Postels & Ruprecht
- Desmarestia intermedia Postels & Ruprecht
- Desmarestia kurilensis Yamada
- Desmarestia latifrons (Ruprecht) Kützing
- Desmarestia latissima Setchell & Gardner
- Desmarestia ligulata (Stackhouse) J.V.Lamouroux
- Desmarestia menziesii J.Agardh
- Desmarestia muelleri M.E.Ramírez & A.F.Peters
- Desmarestia munda Setchell & N.L.Gardner
- Desmarestia patagonica Asensi
- Desmarestia peruviana Montagne
- Desmarestia pinnatinervia Montagne
- Desmarestia pteridoides Reinsch
- Desmarestia rossii J.D.Hooker & Harvey
- Desmarestia sivertsenii Baardseth
- Desmarestia tabacoides Okamura
- Desmarestia tortuosa A.R.O. Chapman
- Desmarestia tropica W.R.Taylor - tropical acidweed
- Desmarestia viridis (O.F.Müller) J.V.Lamouroux - stringy acid kelp, green acid kelp, Desmarest's green weed, or sea sorrel

== Gallery ==
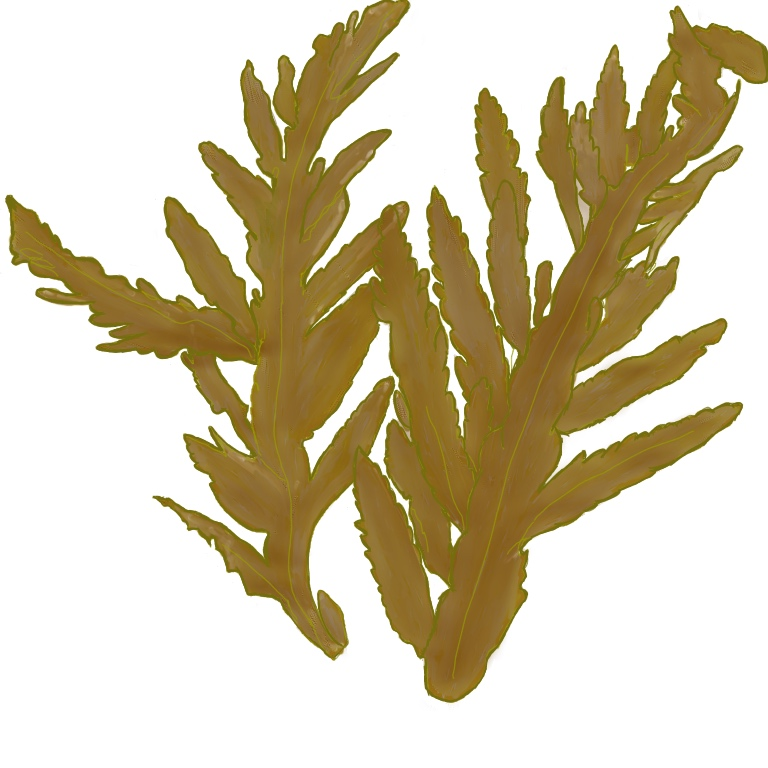
Artistic rendering of Desmarestia ligulata

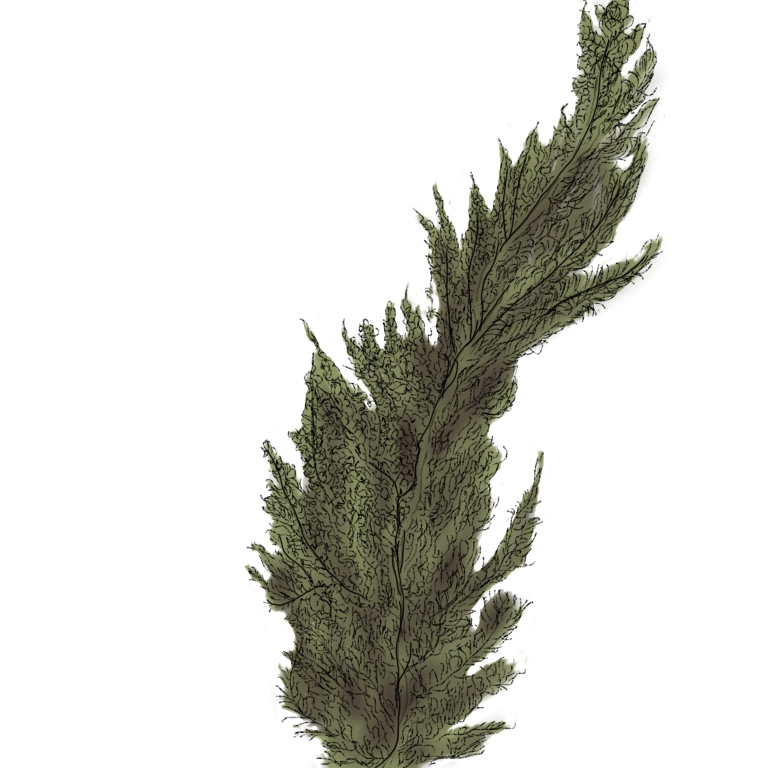
Artistic rendering of Desmarestia kurilensis

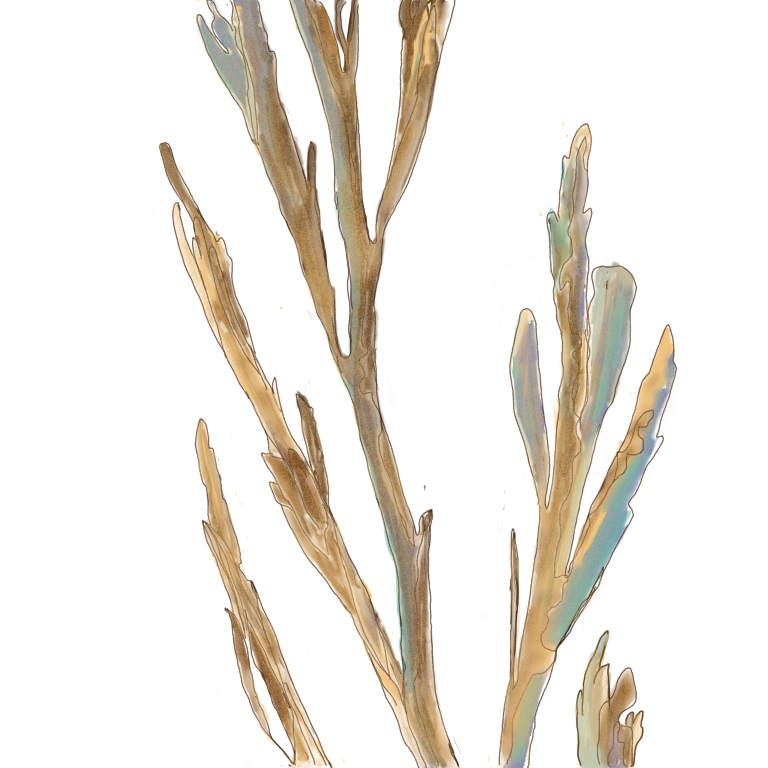
Artistic rendering of Desmarestia latifrons
