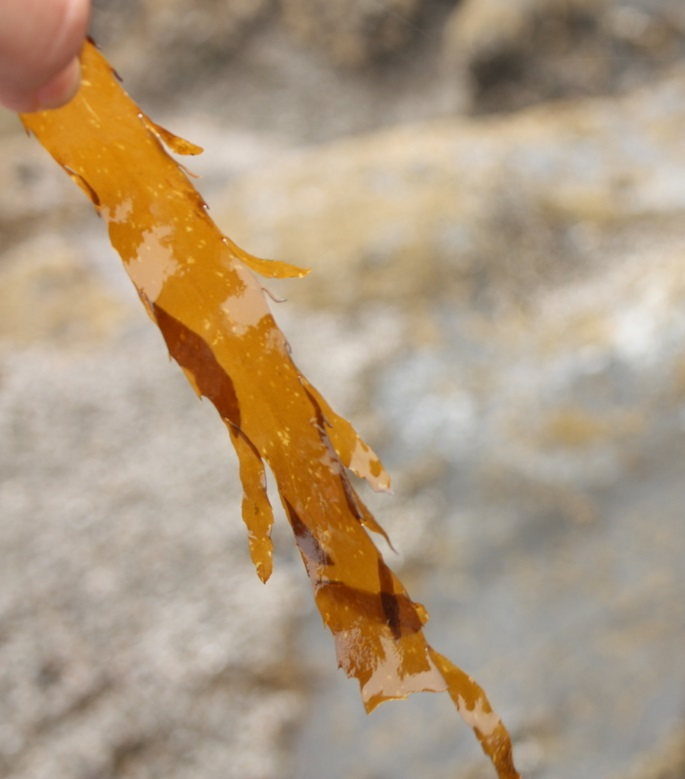
- Desmarestia ligulata

Scientific classification
- Domain: Eukaryota
- Clade: Sar
- Clade: Stramenopiles
- Division: Ochrophyta
- Class: Phaeophyceae
- Order: Desmarestiales
- Family: Desmarestiaceae (Thuret) Kjellman

Genera
- Desmarestia; Himantothallus; Phaeurus

= Desmarestiaceae =

Family of algae

Desmarestiaceae is a family of brown algae, one of two families in the order Desmarestiales. The family gets its name from the genus Desmarestia, which is named after the French zoologist Anselme Gaëtan Desmarest (1784–1838).

There are three genera in this family. Two are monotypic, Himantothallus (species name Himantothallus grandifolius) and Phaeurus (species name Phaeurus antarcticus). These are both endemic to Antarctica. The third genus, Desmarestia, has 30 to 40 species.

Most species have narrow, localized ranges, but some Desmarestia, such as D. ligulata and D. viridis, have disjunct but global distributions. It is thought that the family began its evolution in the Southern Hemisphere and radiated north. It is now distributed across much of the world, but is largely absent from tropical regions. An exception being the possibly extinct D. tropica of the Galápagos Islands. These algae require colder water temperatures for the successful production of gametes.

Species of the Desmarestiaceae can grow large, with the thallus, the plantlike main part of the alga, reaching maximum lengths around 10 meters. They can be flattened or cylindrical, and narrow or many-branched. They are oogamous, with microscopic gametophytes.

The thalli of some Desmarestia contain vacuoles of sulfuric acid with a pH as low as 0.44. These likely evolved to deter predators. These algae have a very sour taste. They can also have a bad odor when they are removed from the water.
