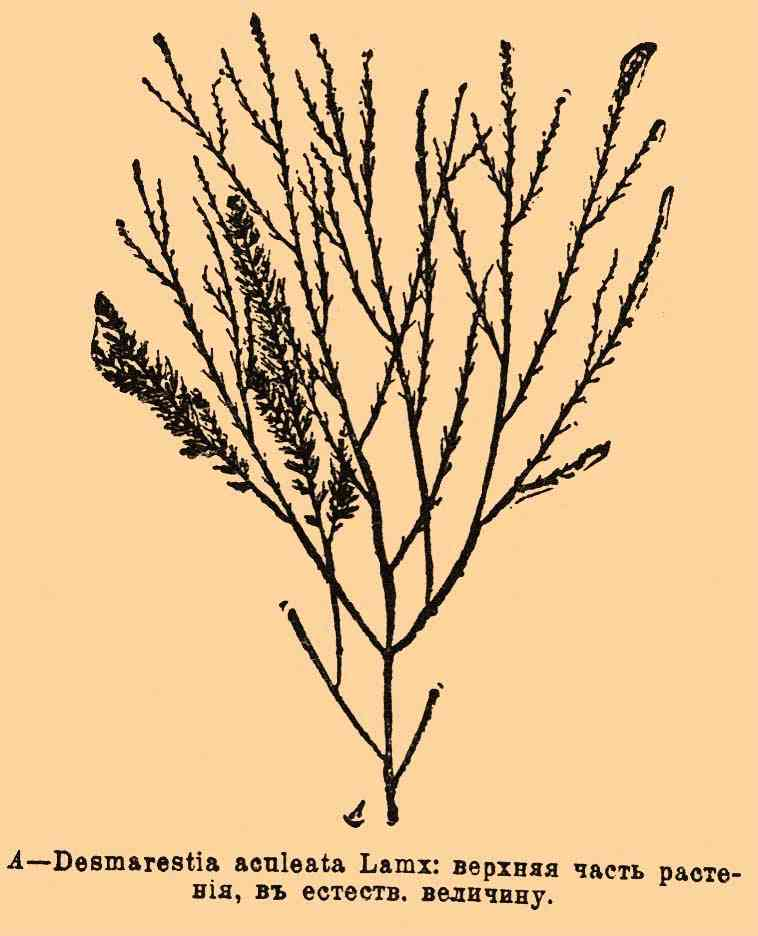
- Desmarestia aculeata

Scientific classification
- Domain: Eukaryota
- Clade: Diaphoretickes
- Clade: SAR
- Clade: Stramenopiles
- Phylum: Gyrista
- Subphylum: Ochrophytina
- Class: Phaeophyceae
- Subclass: Fucophycidae
- Order: Desmarestiales; Setchell & Gardner

Families
- Arthrocladiaceae; Desmarestiaceae

= Desmarestiales =

Order of algae

Desmarestiales is an order in the brown algae (Phaeophyceae). Members of this order have terete or ligulate (flat) pinnately branched thalli attached by discoid holdfasts. They have a sporophytic thallus usually aggregated to form a pseudo-parenchyma. The order gets its name from the genus Desmarestia, which is named after the French zoologist Anselme Gaëtan Desmarest (1784–1838).

As the general name of the class suggests, their pigmentation is brown.
