= List of diplomatic missions of Papua New Guinea =

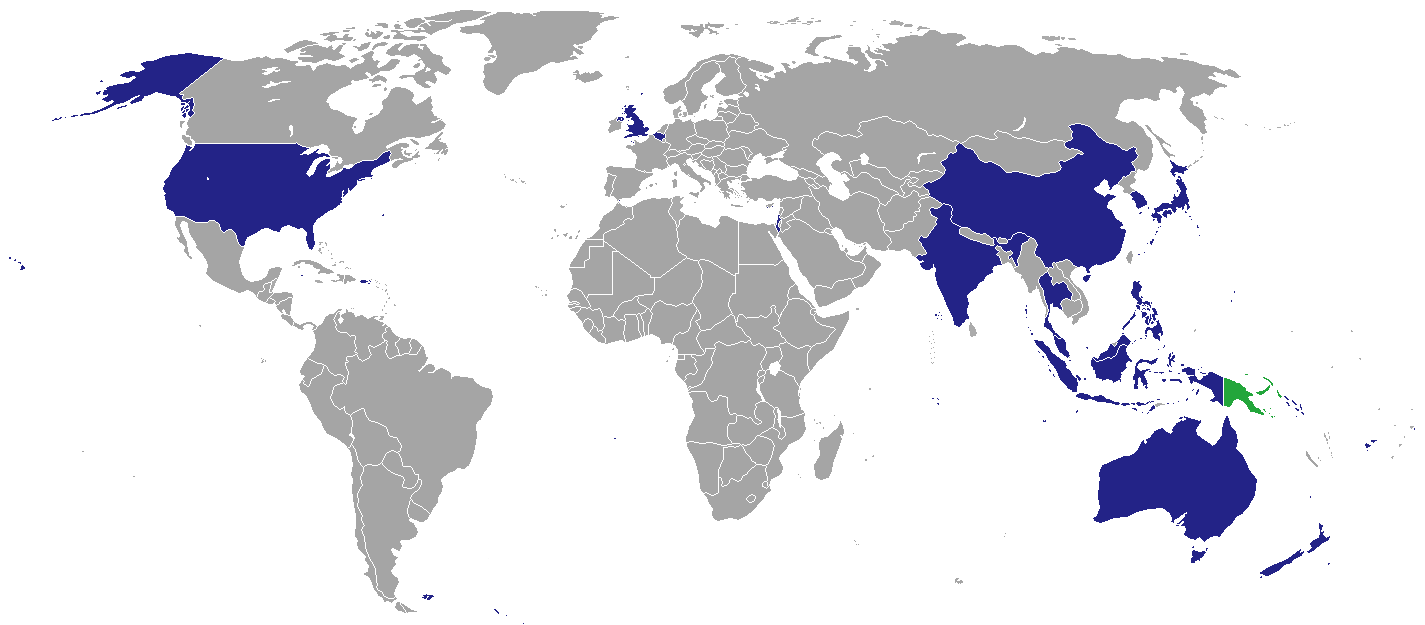
Diplomatic missions of Papua New Guinea

This is a list of diplomatic missions of Papua New Guinea, excluding honorary consulates.

== Americas ==
- United States
  - Washington, D.C. (Embassy)

== Asia ==
- China
  - Beijing (Embassy)
- India
  - New Delhi (High Commission)
- Indonesia
  - Jakarta (Embassy)
  - Jayapura (Consulate-General)
- Israel
  - Jerusalem (Embassy)
- Japan
  - Tokyo (Embassy)
- Malaysia
  - Kuala Lumpur (High Commission) (Note: Also accredited to Cambodia.)
- Philippines
  - Manila (Embassy)
- Singapore
  - Singapore (High Commission)
- South Korea
  - Seoul (Embassy)
- Thailand
  - Bangkok (Embassy)

== Europe ==
- Belgium
  - Brussels (Embassy)
- United Kingdom
  - London (High Commission)

== Oceania ==
- Australia
  - Canberra (High Commission)
  - Brisbane (Consulate-General)
  - Sydney (Consulate-General)
  - Cairns (Consulate)
- Fiji
  - Suva (High Commission)
- New Zealand
  - Wellington (High Commission)
- Solomon Islands
  - Honiara (High Commission)

== Multilateral Organisations ==
- United Nations
  - New York City (Permanent mission)
  - Geneva (Permanent mission) (Note: Also accredited to Switzerland.)

== Gallery ==
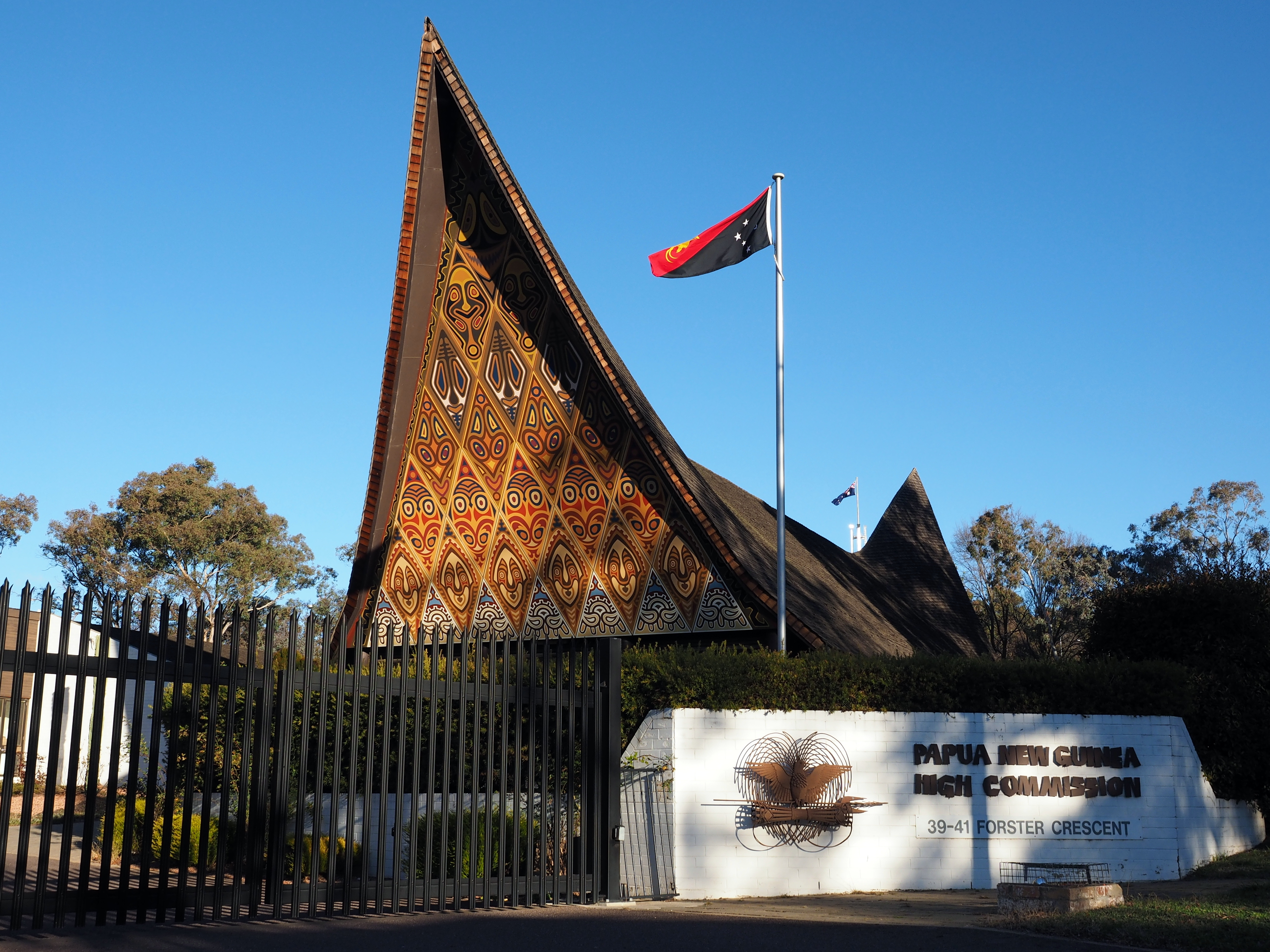
High Commission in Canberra

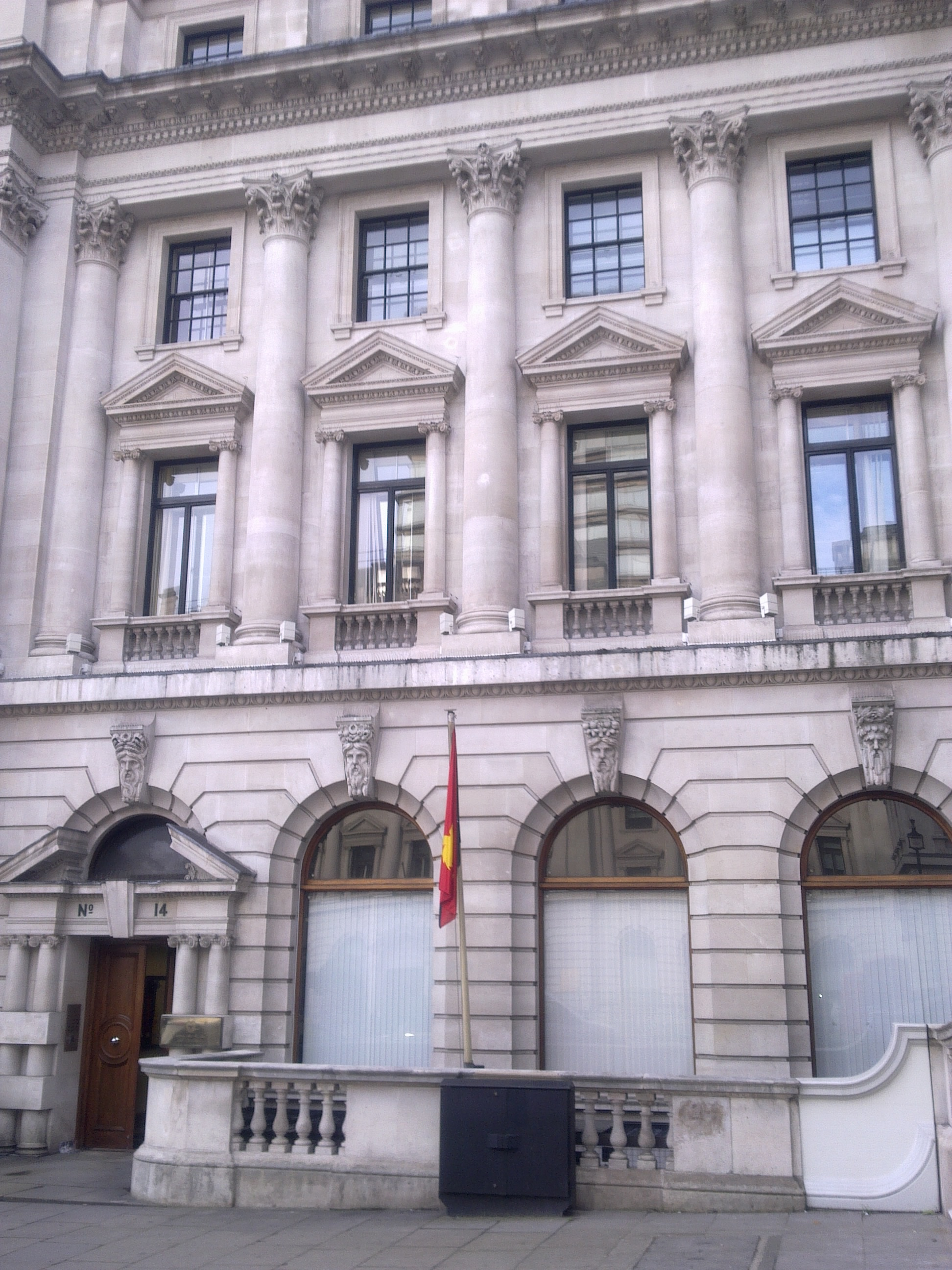
High Commission in London

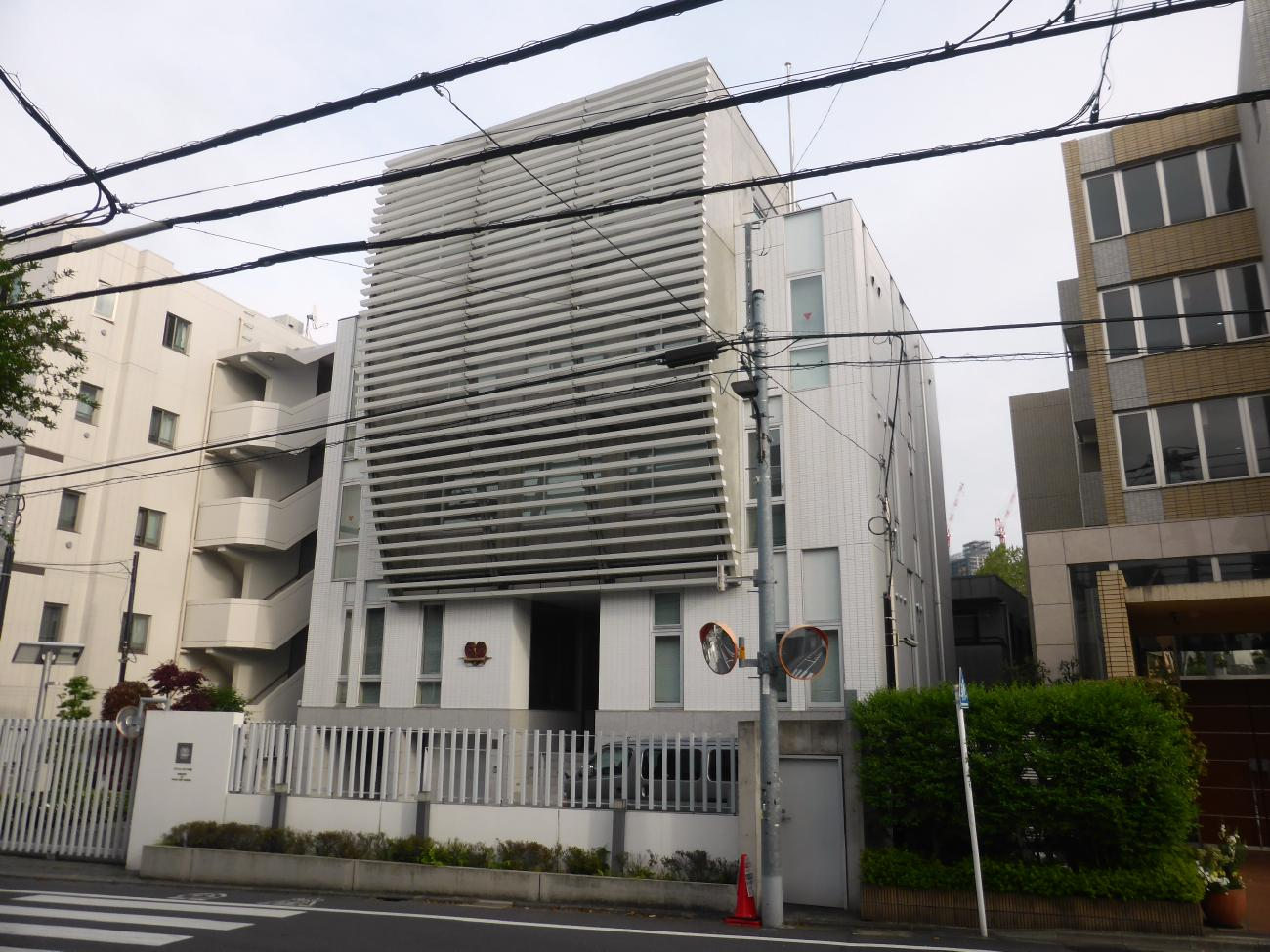
Embassy in Tokyo

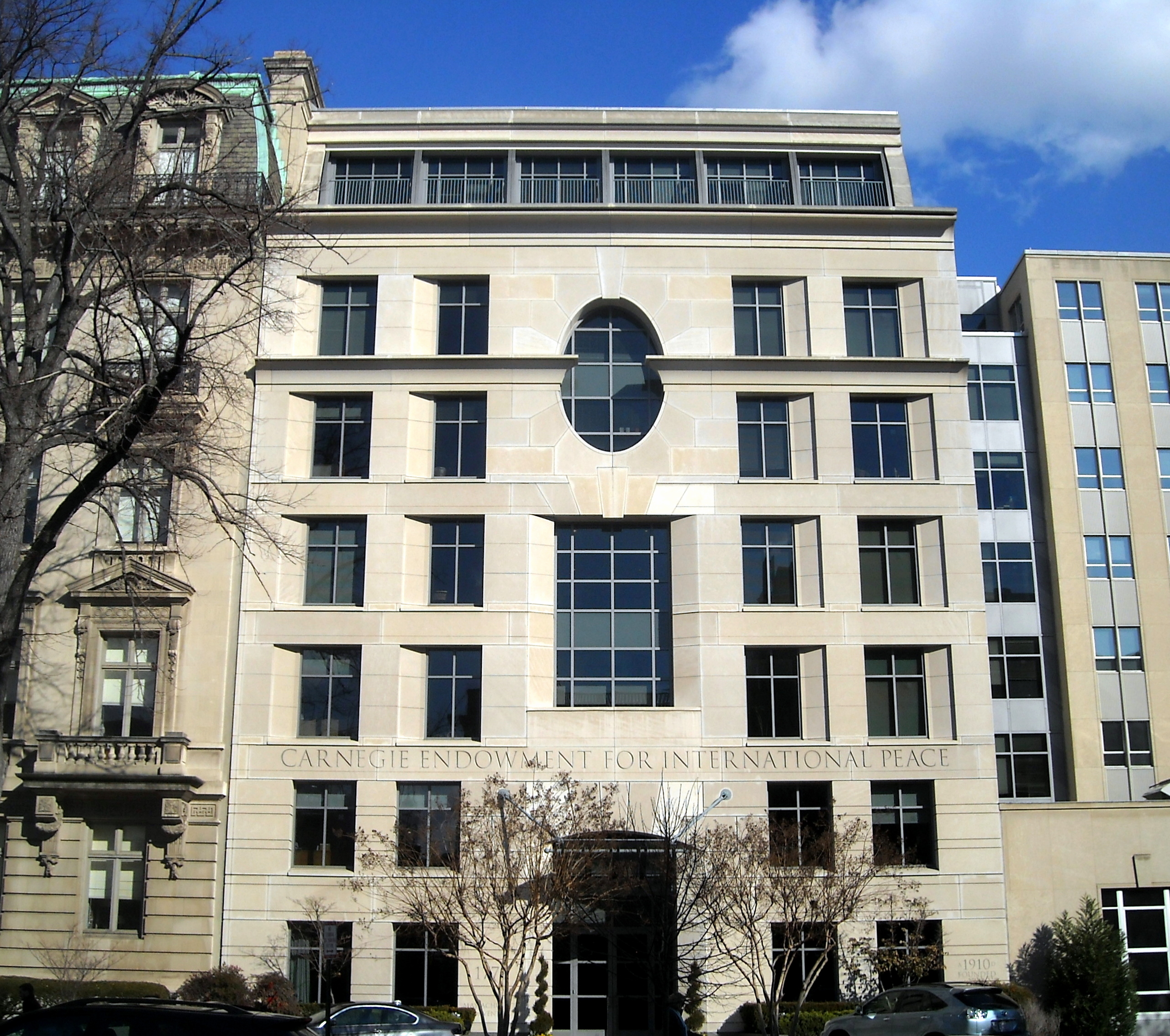
Building hosting the Embassy in Washington, D.C.

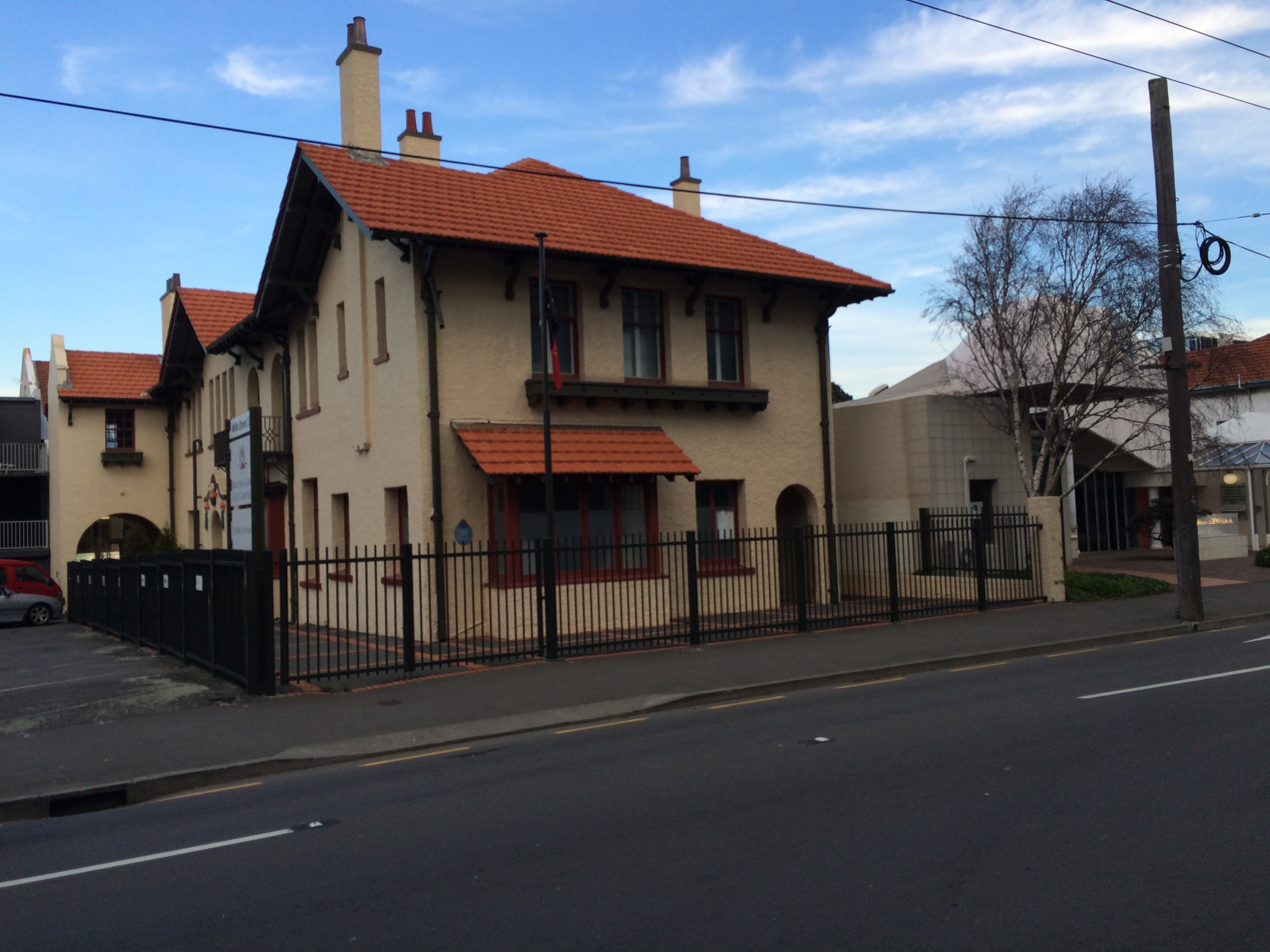
High Commission in Wellington

== Missions to open ==
| Host country | Host city | Mission | Ref. |
|---|---|---|---|
| France | Paris | Embassy | |
| Marshall Islands | Majuro | Embassy | |
| Timor-Leste | Dili | Embassy | |
| Tonga | Nukuʻalofa | High Commission | |
| United Arab Emirates | Abu Dhabi | Embassy | |
| Vanuatu | Port Vila | High Commission | |

== See also ==
- Foreign relations of Papua New Guinea
- List of diplomatic missions in Papua New Guinea
- Visa policy of Papua New Guinea
