= Israel–Papua New Guinea relations =

- Israel: Papua New Guinea

Israel–Papua New Guinea relations are bilateral relations between Israel and Papua New Guinea. Israel and Papua New Guinea established diplomatic relations in 1978, about three years after Papua New Guinea was granted independence.

== History ==
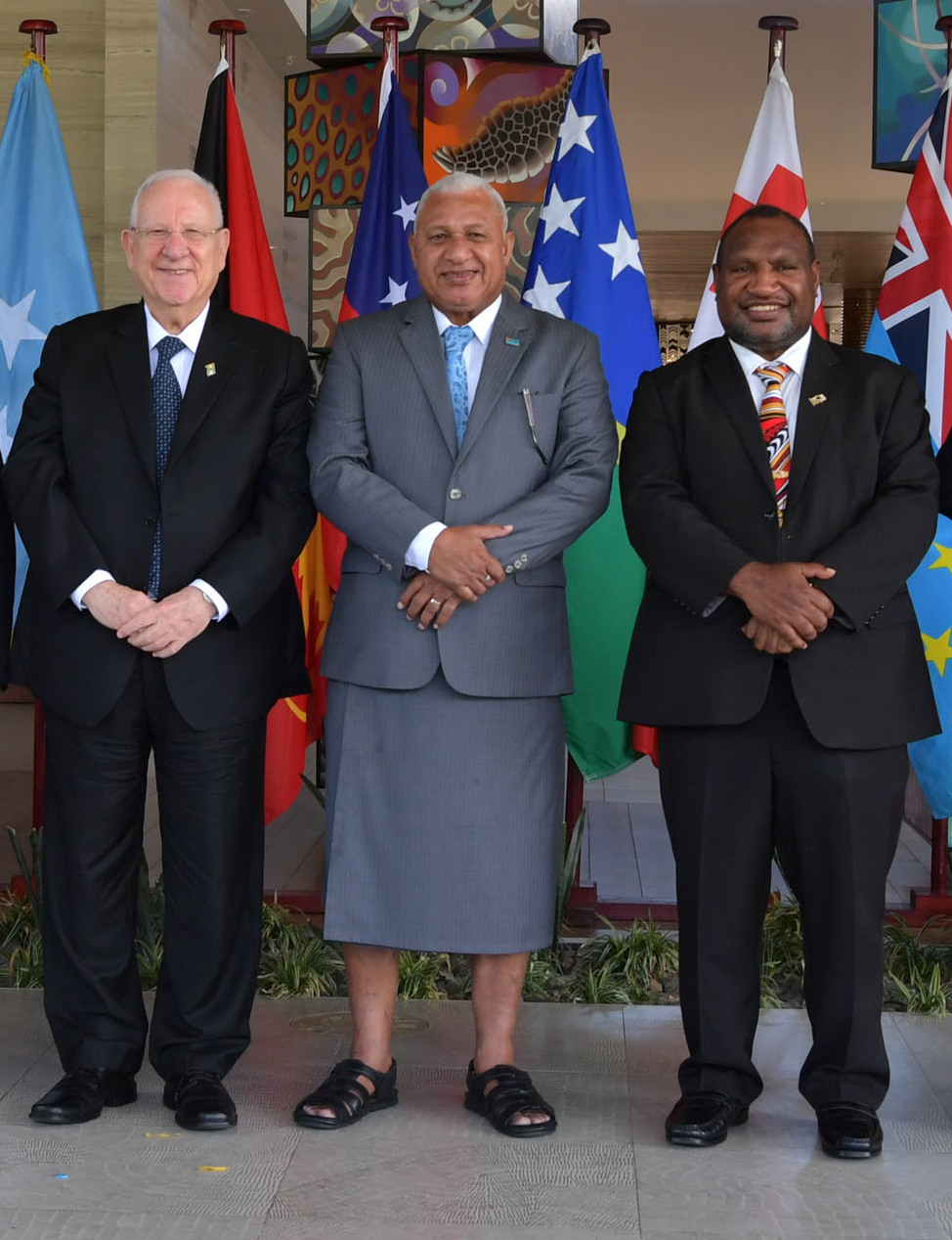
Former Israeli president Reuven Rivlin with James Marape, Prime Minister of Papua New Guinea, 2020

On September 5, 2023, the Papua New Guinea embassy in Jerusalem was inaugurated in a ceremony attended by the Prime Minister of Papua New Guinea James Marape and the Prime Minister of Israel Benjamin Netanyahu.

Israel's ambassador to Australia acts as non-resident ambassador to Papua New Guinea. Since 2007, Ya'akov Weiss has been the Honorary Consul General of Papua New Guinea to Israel, and acts as the diplomatic representative of Papua New Guinea to Israel.

In November 2012, the Papua New Guinea government abstained in the vote on United Nations General Assembly resolution 67/19 recognizing Palestine as a non-member state.

On a visit to Israel, in October 2013, Prime Minister of Papua New Guinea, Peter O'Neill, planted a tree in Jerusalem. During the visit O'Neill stated: "Planting a tree symbolizes that the world has a future and that we all have life."

In 2020 Peter O'Neill was arrested by police in Port Moresby after allegations that he had purchased 2 generators from Israel without Parliamentary approval. But in October 2021 the Papua New Guinea courts acquitted the former Prime Minister from all charges.

=== Gaza war ===
On November 2, 2023, Papua New Guinea was among 15 countries voting against a humanitarian ceasefire in the Gaza war. 120 member states voted in favor and 45 abstained. Other countries in Oceania, such as Fiji, Tonga, Papua New Guinea, Marshall Islands, Nauru, and Micronesia also voted against the ceasefire.

Te Ao Maori News claimed it "looks as though they’re aligning themselves with Israel and the United States". University of Canterbury professor Steven Ratuva claimed this was because of "the rise of evangelical movements in the region which are linked to the evangelical movements in the United States, which are in support of Trump, in support of Israel and Zionism generally". Ratuva also described their economic reliance on the United States as a factor in the decision.

On December 12, 2023, Papua New Guinea was again among the countries voting against an "immediate humanitarian ceasefire", the immediate and unconditional release of all hostages, and "ensuring humanitarian access", in the UN General Assembly.

== Cultural relations ==
There are claims that the Gogodala people in Western Province of Papua New Guinea are the descendants of a lost tribe of Israel. The claims have been analysed by Florida International University religious studies' professor Tudor Parfitt.

== See also ==
- Foreign relations of Israel
- Foreign relations of Papua New Guinea
- Israel–Federated States of Micronesia relations
- International recognition of Israel
