= Foreign relations of Papua New Guinea =

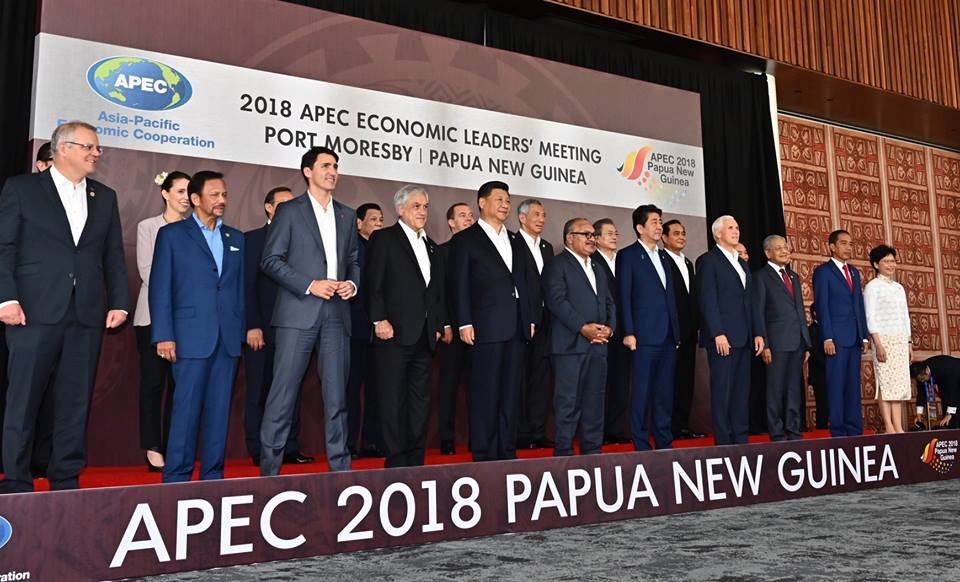
APEC 2018 in Papua New Guinea

Papua New Guinea's foreign policy reflects close ties with Australia and other traditional allies and cooperative relations with neighboring countries. Its views on international political and economic issues are generally moderate.

Papua New Guinea belongs to a variety of regional organizations, including the Asia-Pacific Economic Cooperation (APEC) forum; the ASEAN Regional Forum (ARF) (Papua New Guinea is an observer member of the ASEAN); the South Pacific Commission; the Pacific Islands Forum; the Melanesian Spearhead Group and the South Pacific Regional Environmental Program (SPREP).

Papua New Guinea has been a member of the Forum of Small States (FOSS) since the group's founding in 1992.

== Diplomatic relations ==
List of countries which Papua New Guinea maintains diplomatic relations with:

#	Country	Date
1	Australia	16 September 1975
2	United Kingdom	16 September 1975
3	Indonesia	16 September 1975
4	New Zealand	16 September 1975
5	Fiji	16 September 1975
6	Philippines	16 September 1975
7	United States	16 September 1975
8	Japan	16 September 1975
9	Thailand	14 May 1976
10	Russia	19 May 1976
11	Romania	19 May 1976
12	Singapore	19 May 1976
13	South Korea	19 May 1976
14	India	19 May 1976
15	Mexico	19 May 1976
16	Serbia	23 May 1976
17	North Korea	1 June 1976
18	Switzerland	2 June 1976
19	Mongolia	16 June 1976
20	France	22 June 1976
21	Austria	24 June 1976
22	Malaysia	12 July 1976
23	Canada	9 August 1976
24	Norway	9 August 1976
25	Chile	23 August 1976
26	Netherlands	25 August 1976
27	Germany	16 September 1976
28	Belgium	16 September 1976
29	Pakistan	4 October 1976
30	China	12 October 1976
31	Portugal	15 October 1976
32	Sweden	10 November 1976
33	Hungary	15 January 1977
34	Greece	January 1977
—	Holy See	7 March 1977
35	Ghana	22 August 1977
36	Iraq	27 August 1977
37	Finland	31 August 1977
38	Luxembourg	15 October 1977
39	Denmark	February 1978
40	Poland	10 February 1978
41	Cyprus	20 April 1978
42	Costa Rica	28 April 1978
43	Israel	1 May 1978
44	Solomon Islands	17 August 1978
45	Spain	28 August 1978
46	Argentina	6 November 1978
47	Italy	30 April 1979
48	Turkey	30 May 1979
49	Samoa	27 August 1979
50	Tuvalu	January 1980
51	Tanzania	29 March 1980
52	Vanuatu	30 July 1980
53	Nigeria	August 1982
54	Tonga	August 1982
55	Sri Lanka	17 November 1982
56	Bangladesh	20 June 1983
57	Peru	14 September 1983
58	Brunei	1 May 1984
59	Colombia	2 March 1988
60	Zimbabwe	May 1988
61	Marshall Islands	21 September 1988
62	Federated States of Micronesia	21 September 1988
63	Czech Republic	20 October 1988
64	Uruguay	20 October 1988
65	Maldives	22 December 1988
66	Brazil	27 April 1989
67	Cuba	13 October 1989
68	Vietnam	3 November 1989
69	Laos	6 April 1990
70	Namibia	30 April 1990
71	Venezuela	1 January 1991
72	Jamaica	16 April 1991
73	Myanmar	24 July 1991
74	Albania	28 August 1991
75	Palau	1 October 1994
76	South Africa	7 October 1994
—	State of Palestine	13 January 1995
77	Kuwait	5 April 1995
—	Cook Islands	1995
78	Panama	3 May 1996
79	Cambodia	7 October 1996
80	Croatia	5 December 1997
81	Slovakia	29 October 1999
82	Timor-Leste	22 July 2002
83	Iceland	12 August 2004
84	Slovenia	9 February 2010
85	Botswana	2010
86	Nepal	12 April 2013
—	Niue	9 December 2014
87	Egypt	24 March 2015
88	Paraguay	21 September 2016
89	Estonia	4 October 2016
90	Georgia	4 October 2016
91	Qatar	22 February 2017
92	United Arab Emirates	22 March 2017
93	Malta	6 October 2017
94	Latvia	9 May 2018
95	Morocco	28 September 2018
96	Ireland	26 October 2020
97	Nicaragua	17 February 2023
98	Kazakhstan	24 March 2023
99	Azerbaijan	5 May 2023
100	Bahrain	1 June 2023
101	Bulgaria	14 February 2025
102	Kyrgyzstan	23 September 2025
103	Ukraine	25 September 2025
104	Montenegro	26 September 2026
105	Kiribati	Unknown
106	Nauru	Unknown

== Bilateral relations ==
=== Americas ===
Country	Formal Relations Began	Notes
Canada	9 August 1976	Canada is accredited to Papua New Guinea from its High Commission in Canberra, Australia.; Papua New Guinea is accredited to Canada from its embassy in Washington, D.C., United States.
Cuba	13 October 1989	In the late 2000s, Papua New Guinea began to strengthen its relations with Cuba. Cuba provides medical aid to the country. In September 2008, a PNG government representative attended the first Cuba-Pacific Islands ministerial meeting in Havana, aimed at "strengthening cooperation" between Cuba and Pacific Island countries, notably in coping with the effects of climate change.
Mexico	19 May 1976	See Mexico–Papua New Guinea relations: Mexico is accredited to Papua New Guinea from its embassy in Canberra, Australia.; Papua New Guinea is accredited to Mexico from its embassy in Washington, D.C., United States.
United States	16 September 1975	See Papua New Guinea–United States relations The U.S. and Papua New Guinea are signatories to the U.S.-Pacific Islands Multilateral Tuna Fisheries Treaty, under which the U.S. grants $63 million per year to Pacific Island parties and the latter provide access for U.S. fishing vessels. The U.S. also supports Papua New Guinea's efforts to protect biodiversity; the International Coral Reef Initiative is aimed at protecting reefs in tropical nations such as Papua New Guinea.: Papua New Guinea has an embassy in Washington, D.C.; United States has an embassy in Port Moresby.

=== Asia ===
Country	Formal Relations Began	Notes
China	12 October 1976	See China–Papua New Guinea relations The Independent State of Papua New Guinea and the People's Republic of China (PRC) established official diplomatic relations in 1976, soon after Papua New Guinea became independent. The two countries currently maintain diplomatic, economic and, to a lesser degree, military relations. Relations are cordial; China is a significant provider of both investments and development aid to Papua New Guinea.
Cyprus	20 April 1978	Cyprus is represented in Papua New Guinea through its High Commission in Canberra, Australia.; Both countries are full members of the Commonwealth of Nations.
India	19 May 1976	See India-Papua New Guinea Relations: India has a High Commission in Port Moresby.; Papua New Guinea maintains a High Commission in New Delhi.
Indonesia	16 September 1975	See Indonesia–Papua New Guinea relations Three provinces in Indonesia's Western New Guinea region (Papua, Highland Papua, and South Papua) and Papua New Guinea share a 760-kilometre (470 mi) border that has raised tensions and ongoing diplomatic issues over many decades. Indonesia is represented in Papua New Guinea with an embassy in Port Moresby and a consulate in Vanimo. Reciprocally, Papua New Guinea has an Ambassador in Jakarta and a Consul-General in Jayapura.
Japan	16 September 1975	Diplomatic relations between Japan and Papua New Guinea were established on 16 September 1975, the date Papua-New Guinea became independent. Japan maintains an embassy at Port Moresby. Papua-New Guinea is currently the largest recipient of Japanese foreign aid in the Pacific. Ministerial level visits are frequent between the two countries. Reciprocally, Papua New Guinea has an embassy in Tokyo.
Kuwait	5 April 1995	Diplomatic relations between both countries established 5 April 1995 when first Ambassador of Kuwait to Papua New Guinea with residence in Tokyo Mr.Suhail K. Shuhaiber presented his credentials to Governor General of Papua New Guinea Sir Wiwa Korowi.
Philippines	16 September 1975	In March 2009, The Philippines and Papua New Guinea entered into a Memorandum of Understanding (MoU) that would enhance the cooperation between the two countries on the development of fisheries. The MoU will facilitate technology transfer in aquaculture development, promotion of shipping ventures, investments, technical training, joint research, and "strategic complementation" of each country's plans in the "Coral Triangle" – or the waters between the Philippines, Indonesia, and the Pacific Islands. In the same year, Papua New Guinea asked the Philippines for help in its pursuit of membership to ASEAN.
South Korea	19 May 1976	See Papua New Guinea–South Korea relations. The Independent State of Papua New Guinea and the Republic of Korea established diplomatic relations on 19 May 1976.: Papua New Guinea and South Korea have good relations.; Papua New Guinean embassy in Seoul.; South Korean embassy in Port Moresby.; South Koreans of Long-Term Residents in Papua New Guinea was about around 201 in 2019.
Turkey	30 May 1979	Papua New Guinea has an Honorary Consulate in Istanbul.; Turkey has an embassy in Port Moresby.

=== Europe ===
Country	Formal Relations Began	Notes
France	22 June 1976	See France–Papua New Guinea relations Official diplomatic relations were established in 1976. Papua New Guinea is a member of the United Nations' Special Committee on Decolonization. The French government has noted what it calls Port Moresby's "moderate" attitude on the issue of the decolonisation of New Caledonia - which, like Papua New Guinea, is located in Melanesia. The French National Assembly maintains a Friendship Group with Papua New Guinea.
Poland	10 February 1978	See Papua New Guinea–Poland relations.
Serbia	23 May 1976	Both countries have established diplomatic relations in 1976. Papua New Guinea recognized Kosovo as independent from 3 October 2012 until withdrawing its recognition on 5 July 2018.
Spain	28 August 1978	See Papua New Guinea–Spain relations.: Papua New Guinea is accredited to Spain from its embassy in Brussels, Belgium.; Spain is accredited to Papua New Guinea from its embassy in Canberra, Australia.
United Kingdom	16 September 1975	See Papua New Guinea–United Kingdom relations Papua New Guinean Prime Minister James Marape with British Foreign Secretary James Cleverly in Port Moresby, April 2023. Papua New Guinea established diplomatic relations with the United Kingdom on 16 September 1975. Both countries are Commonwealth Realms.: Papua New Guinea maintains a high commission in London.; The United Kingdom is accredited to Fiji through its high commission in Port Moresby.; The UK governed Papua New Guinea from 1884 until 1906, when the territory was transferred to Australia. Both countries share common membership of the Commonwealth, the International Criminal Court, the United Nations, and the World Trade Organization, as well as the Pacific States–United Kingdom Economic Partnership Agreement, Bilaterally the two countries have a Double Taxation Convention., an Investment Agreement. and a Security Agreement,

=== Oceania ===
Country	Formal Relations Began	Notes
Australia	16 September 1975	See Australia–Papua New Guinea relations Relations with Australia were strained in 2006 when Prime Minister Sir Michael Somare was accused of having facilitated Julian Moti's escape to the Solomon Islands. Moti was wanted in Australia for serious alleged child sex offences. In retaliation, the Australian government banned Somare from entering Australia; all talks between Canberra and Port Moresby were suspended. In September 2007, relations began to thaw, and in December 2007, the new Australian Prime Minister, Kevin Rudd, met Sir Michael in Bali. Rudd announced what appears to be a normalisation of relations: "This relationship has been through a very difficult period in recent times. There has in effect been a freeze on ministerial contact between the two governments. I do not believe that's an appropriate way for the future.": Australia has a High Commission in Port Moresby and a consulate-general in Lae.; Papua New Guinea has a High Commission in Canberra and consulates-general in Brisbane and Sydney.
Fiji	16 September 1975	As of November 2005, relations with Pacific neighbor Fiji have been strained by revelations that a number of Fijian mercenaries have been operating illegally on the island of Bougainville, arming and training a rebel militia. Both Fiji and Papua New Guinea are full members of the Commonwealth of Nations.
New Zealand	16 September 1975	See New Zealand–Papua New Guinea relations: New Zealand has a High Commission in Port Moresby.; Papua New Guinea has a High Commission in Willis Street, Te Aro, Wellington.

== Papua New Guinea and the Commonwealth of Nations ==
Papua New Guinea has been a member state of the Commonwealth of Nations since 1975, when it gained independence from Australia under the terms of the Australian Parliament's Papua New Guinea Independence Act 1975.

== See also ==
- List of diplomatic missions in Papua New Guinea
- List of diplomatic missions of Papua New Guinea
- Category: Treaties of Papua New Guinea
