= France–Papua New Guinea relations =

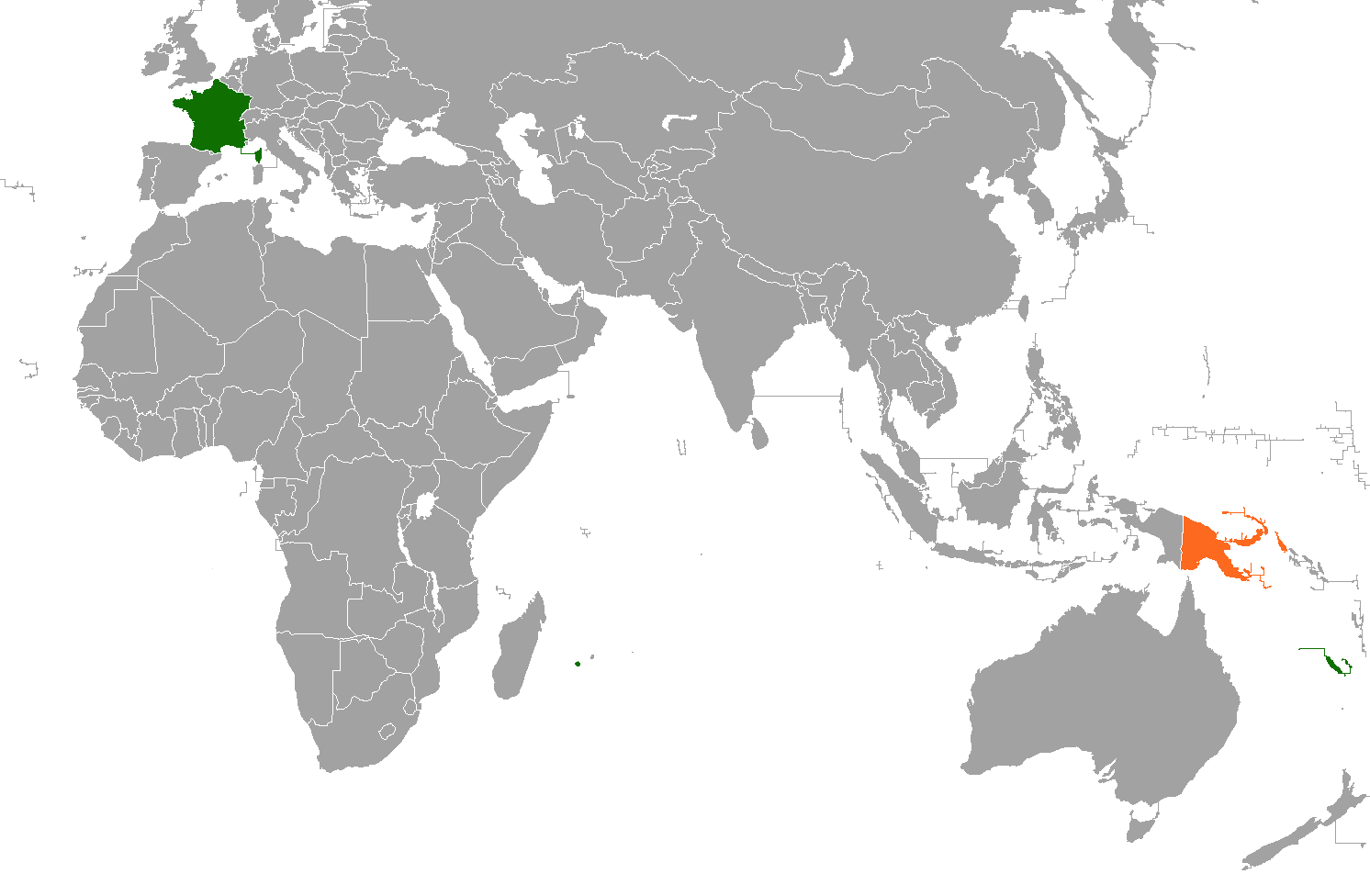
- France: Papua New Guinea

France – Papua New Guinea relations are the foreign relations between France and Papua New Guinea. Official diplomatic relations were established in 1976. France has an embassy in Port Moresby but Papua New Guinea has no diplomatic representation in France. Papua New Guinea's embassy in Brussels covers France.

== History ==
In 1768, French explorer Louis-Antoine de Bougainville landed at what is now Papua New Guinea during his circumnavigation of the world. He gave his name to an island just to the east of New Guinea.

In the 1870s and 1880s, the Marquis de Rays, a French nobleman, attempted to establish a French colony on New Ireland called New France. He sent four ill-fated expeditions to the island, the most famous of which caused the death of 123 settlers.

In 1980, the new state of Vanuatu, formerly the New Hebrides, which had just that year declared independence from France, quelled an uprising with the help of forces from Papua New Guinea. Throughout the 1980s, Papua New Guinea remained highly critical of France due to France's commitment to testing nuclear explosions in the South Pacific. Papua New Guinea co-sponsored with Australia and New Zealand a scientific study of the Moruroa atoll in 1983, but distanced itself from the report when the results concluded that health and environmental risks from nuclear testing were negligible.

== Modern relations ==
Papua New Guinea took part in the second France-Oceania Summit held in Paris in June 2006. Prime Minister Sir Michael Somare opened the session on the political stability of Oceania. Sir Michael also visited Nouméa in April 2005, and "expressed interest in increased cooperation with the French overseas community of New Caledonia". The French government describes this cooperation as "progressing slowly", while noting that "the framework agreement for fisheries cooperation between PNG and New Caledonia which came into effect on 15 October 2002 has not led to more substantial cooperation at this point".

In November 2007, Papua New Guinea's Oro Province was struck by cyclone Guba, and France provided humanitarian aid in the form of medicine, water purification products, food and clothing for victims with the assistance of the Armed Forces of New Caledonia (FANC) and in the context of the FRANZ agreement.

Papua New Guinea is a member of the United Nations' Special Committee on Decolonization. The French government has noted what it calls Port Moresby's "moderate" attitude on the issue of the decolonisation of New Caledonia - which, like Papua New Guinea, is located in Melanesia. The French National Assembly maintains a Friendship Group with Papua New Guinea.

== Economic relations ==
Economic relations are minimal. In 2003, French exports to Papua New Guinea were worth €2 million, accounting for just 0.3% of the country's imports.

== Military cooperation ==
The Armed Forces of New Caledonia (FANC) cooperate with the Papua New Guinea Defence Force through joint exercises. In May 2005, a joint exercise was conducted.

A plan for bilateral cooperation between the FANC and PNG's defense forces was approved in November 2004, centered around training for peacekeeping operations.

== See also ==
- Foreign relations of France
- Foreign relations of Papua New Guinea
