= List of diplomatic missions in Papua New Guinea =

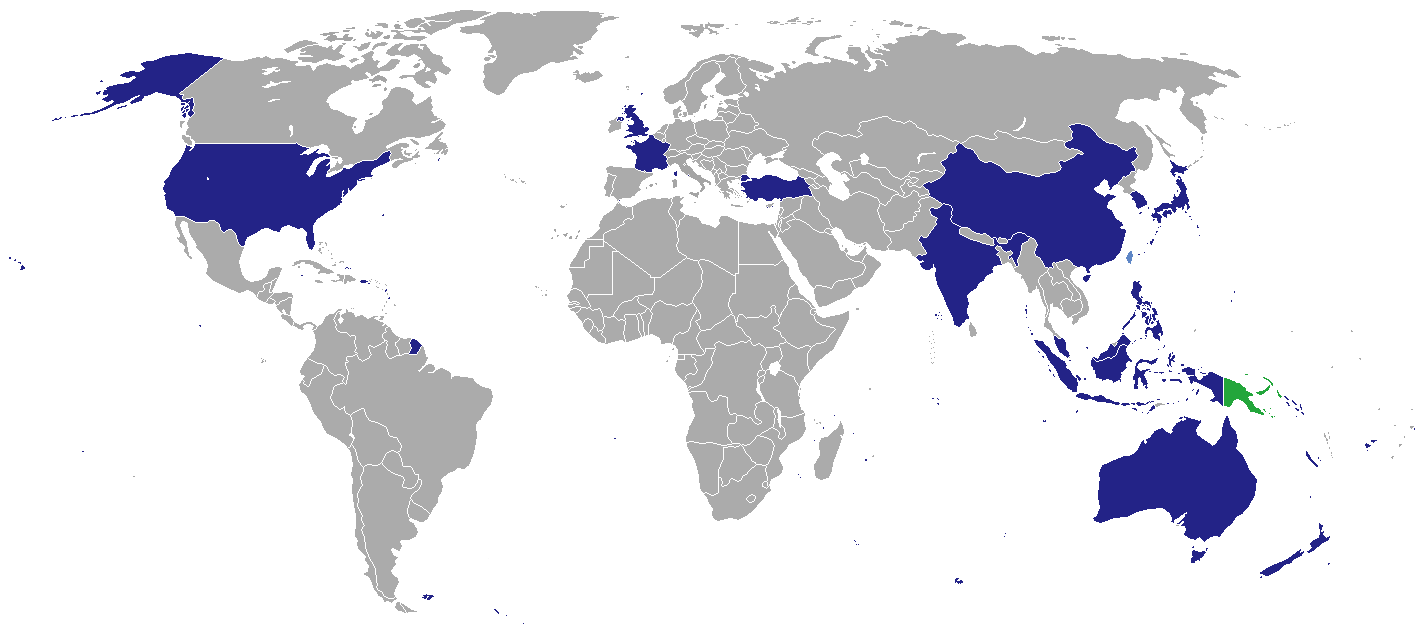
Map of diplomatic missions in Papua New Guinea

This is a list of diplomatic missions in Papua New Guinea. The Independent State of Papua New Guinea is located in Oceania on the eastern half of the island of New Guinea. Its capital city, Port Moresby, hosts 16 high commissions and embassies.

== Diplomatic missions in Port Moresby ==
=== Embassies and High Commissions ===
- Australia
- China
- Fiji
- France
- Holy See
- India
- Indonesia
- Japan
- Malaysia
- New Zealand
- Philippines
- Solomon Islands
- South Korea
- Turkey
- United Kingdom
- United States

=== Other missions/representative offices ===
- European Union (Delegation)

== Consular missions ==
=== Lae ===
- Australia (Consulate-General)

=== Vanimo ===
- Indonesia (Consulate)

== Non-resident embassies accredited to Papua New Guinea ==
=== Resident in Canberra, Australia ===
- Afghanistan
- Algeria
- Argentina
- Belgium
- Belarus
- Botswana
- Brazil
- Bulgaria
- Canada
- Chile
- Colombia
- Costa Rica
- Cyprus
- El Salvador
- Egypt
- Estonia
- Finland
- Germany
- Greece
- Guatemala
- Ireland
- Israel
- Iran
- Italy
- Jordan
- Kenya
- Libya
- Mexico
- Mongolia
- Morocco
- Netherlands
- Nigeria
- Norway
- Palestine
- Paraguay
- Peru
- Poland
- Portugal
- Saudi Arabia
- Serbia
- Singapore
- Spain
- Sri Lanka
- Sudan
- Sweden
- Switzerland
- Thailand
- Timor-Leste
- Uganda
- Venezuela

=== Resident in Jakarta, Indonesia ===
- Bahrain
- Bangladesh
- Denmark
- North Korea
- Pakistan
- Russia
- Tunisia
- Ukraine
- Vietnam

=== Resident in Singapore ===
- Austria
- Hungary
- Kazakhstan
- Panama
- United Arab Emirates
- Zimbabwe

=== Resident in Tokyo, Japan ===
- Benin
- Burkina Faso
- Cameroon
- Democratic Republic of the Congo
- Djibouti
- Dominican Republic
- Gabon
- Haiti
- Honduras
- Jamaica
- Kyrgyzstan
- Lesotho
- Madagascar
- Malawi
- Mali
- Mauritania
- Mozambique
- Nicaragua
- Tanzania
- Togo
- Zambia

=== Resident in Kuala Lumpur, Malaysia ===
- Czech Republic
- Maldives
- Eswatini
- Namibia
- Syria
- Turkmenistan
- Tajikistan
- Yemen

=== Resident in Beijing, China ===
- Burundi
- Cape Verde
- Comoros
- Equatorial Guinea
- Guinea-Bissau
- Guyana
- Republic of the Congo
- Sierra Leone
- South Sudan
- Suriname
- Trinidad and Tobago

=== Resident in other capitals ===
- Bolivia (Ottawa)
- Barbados (Ottawa)
- Central African Republic (Pretoria)
- Cuba (Suva)
- Cook Islands (Wellington)
- Gambia (Riyadh)
- Ivory Coast (Seoul)
- Iceland (Reykjavík)
- Marshall Islands (Suva)
- Niger (New Delhi)
- Palau (Manila)
- Romania (Singapore)
- Seychelles (New York City)

== Closed missions ==
- Germany (Embassy closed in 1999) (Note: Resident in Canberra, Australia)
- Republic of China (Taiwan) (Economic Office closed in 2026)

== Mission to open ==
Host city	Sending country	Mission	Ref.
Port Moresby	Timor-Leste	Embassy	

== See also ==
- Foreign relations of Papua New Guinea
- List of diplomatic missions of Papua New Guinea
- Visa requirements for Papua New Guinean citizens
