= Mexico–Papua New Guinea relations =

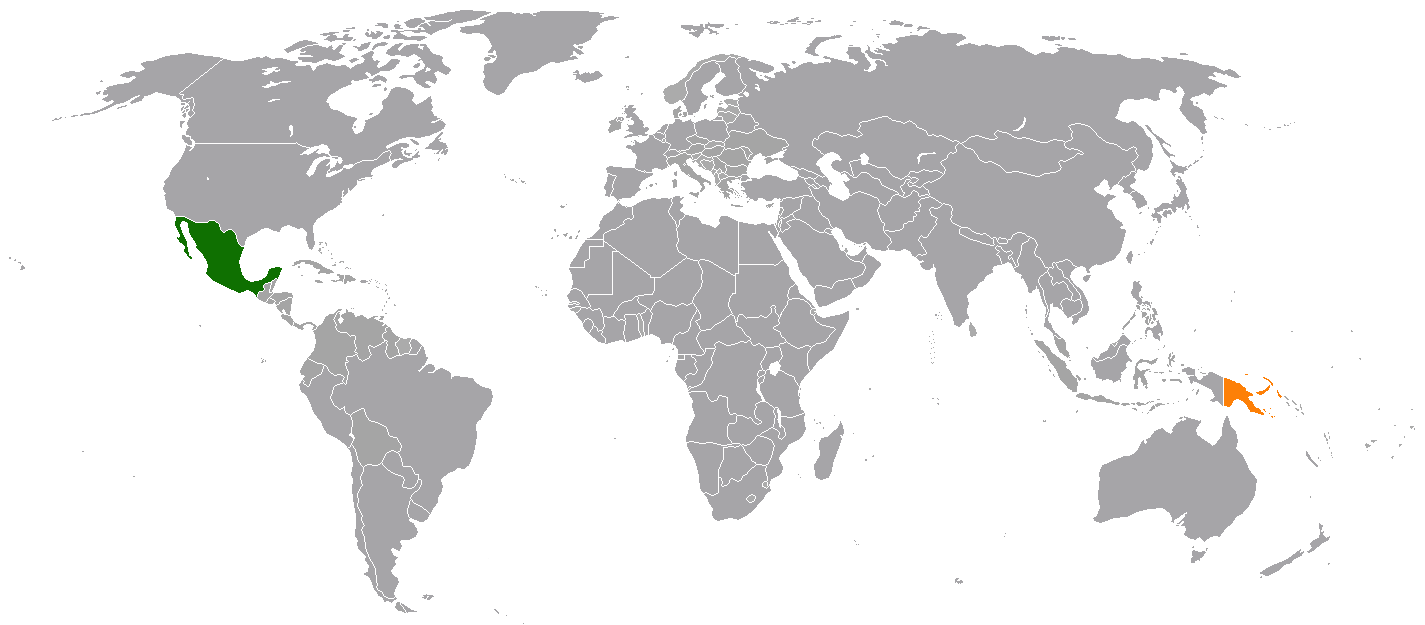

- Mexico: Papua New Guinea

The nations of Mexico and Papua New Guinea established diplomatic relations in 1976. Both nations are members of APEC and the United Nations.

== History ==
On 19 May 1976, Mexico and Papua New Guinea established diplomatic relations. Overall relations between both nations have been limited and have taken place in mainly multilateral forums such as at APEC summits or at the United Nations. In October 2002, Papua New Guinean Prime Minister Michael Somare attended the APEC summit held in Los Cabos, Mexico.

In November 2010, Papuan New Guinea Special Envoy and Ambassador for Environment & Climate Change, Kevin Conrad, attended and represented Papua New Guinea at the United Nations Climate Change Conference held in Cancún, Mexico. In October 2013, during the APEC summit in Bali, Indonesia, Mexican President Enrique Peña Nieto and Papuan New Guinean Prime Minister Peter O'Neill met and discussed bilateral relations between both nations.

In November 2018, Mexican Undersecretary of the Economy, Juan Carlos Baker Pineda, represented Mexico and led its delegation at the APEC Papua New Guinea summit held in Port Moresby.

In 2024, both nations celebrated 48 years of diplomatic relations.

== High-level visits ==
High-level visits from Mexico to Papua New Guinea

- Undersecretary of the Economy Juan Carlos Baker Pineda (2018)

High-level visits from Papua New Guinea to Mexico

- Prime Minister Michael Somare (2002)
- Special Envoy for the Environment Kevin Conrad (2010)

== Trade ==
In 2023, trade between Mexico and Papua New Guinea totaled US$2.8 million. Mexico's main exports to Papua New Guinea include: tubes and pipes of iron or steel, chemical baed products, petroleum, machinery and mechanical appliances. Papua New Guinea's main exports to Mexico include: electronic integrated circuits, data processing machines, hides and skins, plastic articles for the packaging of goods, aluminum, instruments and apparatus for measuring radiation.

== Diplomatic missions ==
- Mexico is accredited to Papua New Guinea from its embassy in Canberra, Australia and maintains an honorary consulate in Port Moresby.
- Papua New Guinea is accredited to Mexico from its embassy in Washington, D.C., United States.
