= Papua New Guinea–United States relations =

- Papua New Guinea: United States

Papua New Guinea–United States relations refers to the diplomatic relations between Papua New Guinea and the United States of America. The two countries established diplomatic relations following Papua New Guinea's independence on September 16, 1975. The two nations belong to a variety of regional organizations, including the Asia-Pacific Economic Cooperation (APEC) forum; the ASEAN Regional Forum (ARF); the Pacific Community (SPC); and the South Pacific Regional Environmental Program (SPREP).

The U.S. maintains an embassy in Port Moresby, Papua New Guinea. Papua New Guinea has an embassy in Washington, D.C.

== History ==
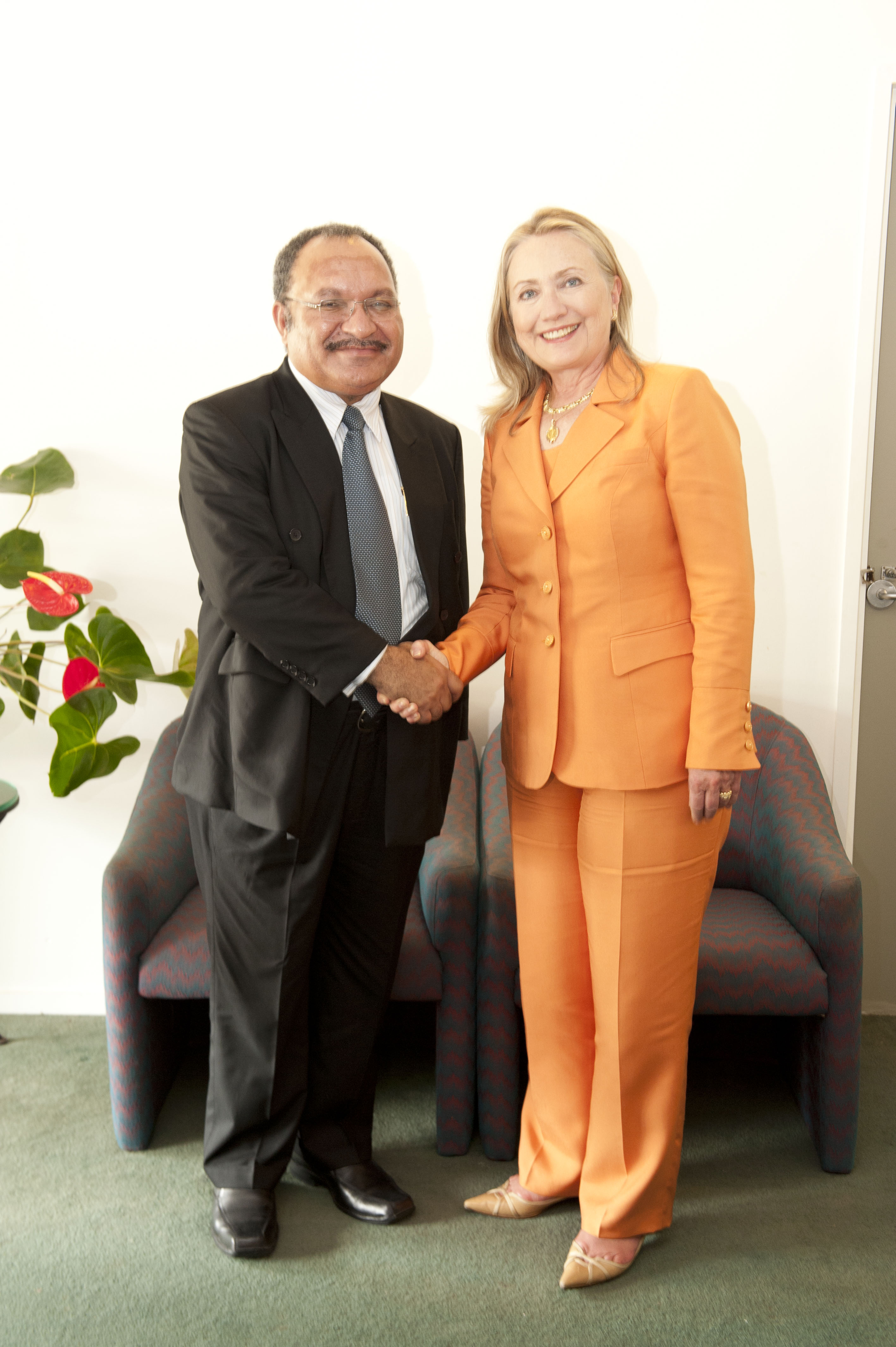
Prime minister Peter O'Neill with American politician Hillary Clinton, 2012

The United States and Papua New Guinea established diplomatic relations upon the latter's independence on September 16, 1975.

The U.S. Peace Corps ceased operations in Papua New Guinea in 2001 due to security concerns. About 2,000 U.S. citizens live in Papua New Guinea, with major concentrations at the headquarters of New Tribes Mission and the Summer Institute of Linguistics, both being missionary organizations located in the Eastern Highlands Province.

In May 2023, a defense agreement was announced between the two countries. The PNG Prime Minister James Marape agreed to release the full details of the agreement but categorically stated that the US would be prohibited from launching an offensive war from the Island. The agreement is seen as a part of the on-going tension between the United States and China over influence in the region. On 22 May, the United States and Papuan governments formally signed two defence and maritime agreements. The agreements permit use of Lombrum Naval Base and Momote Airport. In response, students from several Papuan universities including the Papua New Guinea University of Technology, University of Goroka, and University of Papua New Guinea staged protests to coincide with the signing of the bilateral security treaty, calling for transparency and clarity.

In November and December of 2023, Papua New Guinea voted against an "immediate humanitarian ceasefire" in the UN General Assembly. New Zealand newspaper Te Ao Maori News claimed it "looks as though they’re aligning themselves with Israel and the United States". University of Canterbury professor Steven Ratuva claimed this was because of "the rise of evangelical movements in the region which are linked to the evangelical movements in the United States, which are in support of Trump, in support of Israel and zionism generally". Ratuva also described their economic reliance on the United States as a factor in the decision.

== See also ==
- Foreign relations of Papua New Guinea
- List of ambassadors of the United States to Papua New Guinea
- Israel–Papua New Guinea relations
- History of Papua New Guinea
- Decolonisation of Oceania
