= Dione arcuata =

Conservation status
- Nationally Critical (NZ TCS)

Scientific classification
- Domain: Eukaryota
- Clade: Archaeplastida
- Division: Rhodophyta
- Class: Bangiophyceae
- Order: Bangiales
- Family: Bangiaceae
- Genus: Dione; W.A.Nelson
- Species: D. arcuata

Binomial name
- Dione arcuata W.A.Nelson

Species of red algae

Dione arcuata, commonly known as eyelash seaweed, is the only species of the red algae genus Dione. The specific name arcuata comes from Latin and refers to the bow-like curved shape of the algae, while the generic name Dione is another name for the goddess Venus. It is made of filaments that are around 1.5 centimeters long; they are curved, wide, and do not split into branches.

== Taxonomy ==
The first collection of the algae was made in 2000, and it was marked as a potential new species. Eyelash seaweed was first analyzed in a 2004 study on the genus Bangia. It was initially called "Bangia sp. BKE" and its genetic dissimilarity to other species in Bangia was noted. Dione arcuata was first formally described by Wendy Nelson in 2005, along with the related alga Minerva aenigmata. Nelson split both species from Bangia based on morphological, habitat, and genetic differences.

== Ecology ==
Eyelash seaweed is endemic to New Zealand and can be found attached to rocks in shady tidal areas. The species has a highly restricted range, with only two known populations on two large boulders at one point of the eastern shore of the South Island. D. arcuata is difficult to find, as it is the sole member of Bangiales in New Zealand that is only exposed at extremely low water levels. Furthermore, it has only been seen during the summer, in November and December. The discovery of D. arcuata and M. aenigmata is indicative of the high density of algal biodiversity at certain New Zealand sites, and of the variability of biodiversity across different locations.

In 2019, Dione arcuata was assessed by the New Zealand Department of Conservation as threatened and Nationally Critical. There is a high likelihood that eyelash seaweed is now extinct. The 2016 Kaikōura earthquake buried one of the boulders that the algae inhabited, and greatly disrupted the other. The species has not been found in the wild since the earthquake.
