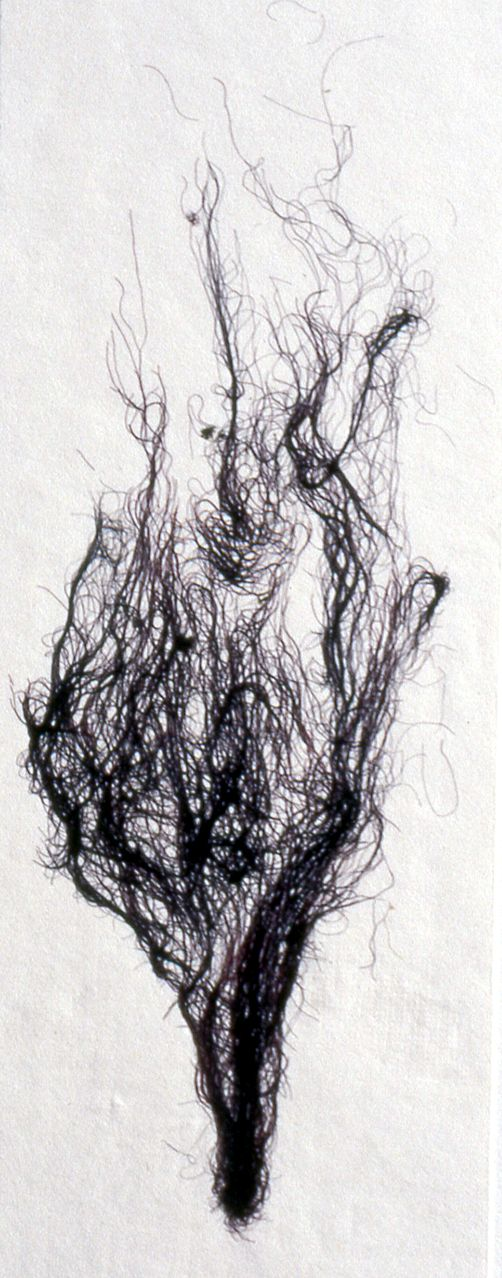
- Bangia fuscopurpurea

Scientific classification
- Domain: Eukaryota
- Clade: Archaeplastida
- Division: Rhodophyta
- Class: Bangiophyceae
- Order: Bangiales
- Family: Bangiaceae
- Genus: Bangia; Lyngbye, 1819

Type species
- Bangia atropurpurea (Mertens ex Roth) C.Agardh

Species
- see text

Synonyms
- Aspalatia Ercegovic, 1927; Bangiadulcis W.A. Nelson, 2007; Bangiella Gaillon, 1833; Diadenus Palisot de Beauvois ex O.Kuntze, 1891; Girardia S.F.Gray, 1821

= Bangia =

Extant genus of division Rhodophyta that grows in marine or freshwater habitats

Bangia is an extant genus of division Rhodophyta that grows in marine or freshwater habitats. Bangia has small thalli with rapid growth and high reproductive output, and exhibits behavior characteristic of r-selected species. The plants are attached by down-growing rhizoids, usually in dense purple-black to rust-colored clumps. The chloroplasts of Bangia, like others in the division Rhodophyta, contain chlorophyll a and sometimes chlorophyll d, as well as accessory pigments such as phycobilin pigments and xanthophylls. Depending on the relative proportions of these pigments and the light conditions, the overall color of the plant can range from green to red to purple to grey; however, the red pigment, phycoerythrin, is usually dominant.

== Species ==
- Bangia aeruginosa Sprengel
- Bangia amethystina Kützing
- Bangia anisogona Meneghini
- Bangia annulina (Roth) Sprengel
- Bangia atropurpurea (Mertens ex Roth) C.Agardh
  - Bangia atropurpurea f. ferruginea Migula
  - Bangia atropurpurea f. muscicola Marcucci & Beccari
  - Bangia atropurpurea f. tenuis Collins
  - Bangia atropurpurea subsp. brevisegmenta Womersley
  - Bangia atropurpurea subsp. coccinea (Kützing) De Toni
  - Bangia atropurpurea subsp. roseopurpurea (Kützing) De Toni
  - Bangia atropurpurea var. anisogona (Meneghini) Kützing
  - Bangia atropurpurea var. breviarticulata Baglietto
  - Bangia atropurpurea var. coccineopurpurea (Kützing) Rabenhorst
  - Bangia atropurpurea var. elongata Brébisson
  - Bangia atropurpurea var. elongata C.Agardh
  - Bangia atropurpurea var. ferruginea (Kerner) Rabenhorst
  - Bangia atropurpurea var. heteronema Derbès & Solier
  - Bangia atropurpurea var. muscicola De Notaris
  - Bangia atropurpurea var. pacifica J.Agardh
  - Bangia atropurpurea var. roseopurpurea (Kützing) Rabenhorst
- Bangia atrovirens Lyngbye
- Bangia biseriata Meneghini
- Bangia breviarticulata C.K.Tseng
- Bangia callicoma Meneghini
- Bangia carnea (Dillwyn) Harvey
- Bangia coccineopurpurea Kützing
- Bangia condensata Zanardini
- Bangia confervoides Zanardini
- Bangia crispula Chauvin
- Bangia discoidea A.Aziz
- Bangia dura Zanardini
- Bangia enteromorphoides E.Y.Dawson
- Bangia fergusonii Grunow
- Bangia ferruginea Kerner
- Bangia flocculosa Schousboe
- Bangia foetida Sprengel
- Bangia foetida Steudel
- Bangia foliacea Schousboe
- Bangia fulvescens (C.Agardh) J.Agardh
- Bangia fuscopurpurea (Dillwyn) Lyngbye
  - Bangia fuscopurpurea f. viridis Wittrock & Nordstedt
  - Bangia fuscopurpurea var. concatenata Kützing
  - Bangia fuscopurpurea var. crinalis De Notaris
  - Bangia fuscopurpurea var. crispa Holmes & Batters
  - Bangia fusco-purpurea var. fuscenses W.J.Hooker
  - Bangia fuscopurpurea var. jadertina Kützing
  - Bangia fuscopurpurea var. pilosella Ardissone
  - Bangia fuscopurpurea var. setacea Kützing
- Bangia gloiopeltidicola Tanaka
- Bangia grateloupicola P.Crouan & H.Crouan
- Bangia halymeniae M.J.Wynne
- Bangia harveyi Areschoug
- Bangia homotrichoides Kützing
- Bangia intricata Brébisson & Godey
- Bangia intricata Suhr ex Rabenhorst
- Bangia kerkensis Meneghini
- Bangia lacustris Carmichael
- Bangia lanuginosa Harvey
- Bangia latissima Meneghini
- Bangia malacensis (Kützing) Kützing
- Bangia maxima Gardner
- Bangia punctulata Schousboe
- Bangia purpurea Schousboe
- Bangia quadripunctata Lyngbye
- Bangia radicula B.F.Zheng & J.Li
- Bangia sericea Bory
- Bangia simplex A.H.S.Lucas
- Bangia tanakae Pham-Hoàng Hô
- Bangia tavarisii Welwitsch
- Bangia tenuis N.L.Gardner
- Bangia thaerasiae Bory
- Bangia trichodes Schousboe
- Bangia vermicularis Harvey
- Bangia viridis Lyngbye
- Bangia yamadae Tanaka

== Description ==
Bangia is a red alga that arises from a discoid holdfast and short stipe consisting of the extensions of rhizoidal cells. Bangia has unbranched, erect thalli forming initially uniseriate filaments becoming multiseriate at maturity. The plant is composed of filiform, unbranched cylinders of cells embedded in a firm gelatinous matrix. The cell contains a stellate chloroplast with prominent pyrenoid, as well as single thylakoids (characteristic of division Rhodophyta). The growth of Bangia is diffuse and intercalary, and each cell is quadrate to rectangular in shape. Primary pitt connections are absent in all but the conchocelis stage.

== Distribution ==
Bangia grows in freshwater or in marine habitats, usually forming dense clumps or mats, and occur throughout the intertidal area and subtidally to the maximum depth at which benthic algae occur. The plants are usually attached to a solid substratum (rock or shell), but can also occur as epiphytes attached to other algae.

== Ecology ==
Marine populations of Bangia in the Atlantic Ocean are common food for the periwinkle Littorina littorea.

== Reproduction ==
Species of Bangia undergo a heteromorphic alternation of generation life cycle in which the haploid generation is dominant. Reproduction can be either sexual or asexual; sexual plants occur mainly during the cold season of the year, while at other times the thalli often bear monosporangia only. Bangia, like all Rhodophytes, lack motile sperm and so depend upon water currents to transport their gametes to the trichogyne (receptive area of the female gamete or carpogonium).

All sexual reproduction in rhodophytes is oogamous. Carposporangia are formed through direct division of the zygote. Carpospores germinate to form the diploid filamentous conchocelis phase, which produces conchosporangial branches bearing conchosporangia, each containing a single conchospore. These conchospores then germinate to form gametophytes. During the "conchocelis stage", the plants can also self-replicate using monospores. The monospores develop directly into new plants and may germinate within the sporangia.

== Scientific interest ==
Silicified peritidal carbonate rocks have been found off Somerset Island, arctic Canada, which contain fossils of well-preserved bangiophyte red algae (Bangiomorpha). Because these fossils have multiseriate filaments derived by longitudinal divisions from uniseriate filaments, taxonomists believe that these fossils are related to Bangia. This resolution distinguished these fossils from other pre-Ediacaran eukaryotes and contributes to evidence that multicellular algae diversified before the Ediacaran radiation of large animals.

== Related genera ==
Bangiadulcis and Pseudobangia were previously thought to be part of the genus Bangia. However, it has since been discovered that these plants can only undergo asexual reproduction through the formation of archaeosporangia. In fact, sexual reproduction has so far only been recorded in Bangia, Porphyra, Erythrotrichia and Erythrocladia.

== Etymology ==
The genus was named after Niels Hofman Bang (1803–1886), the Danish patron of Hans Christian Lyngbye, who described the genus.
