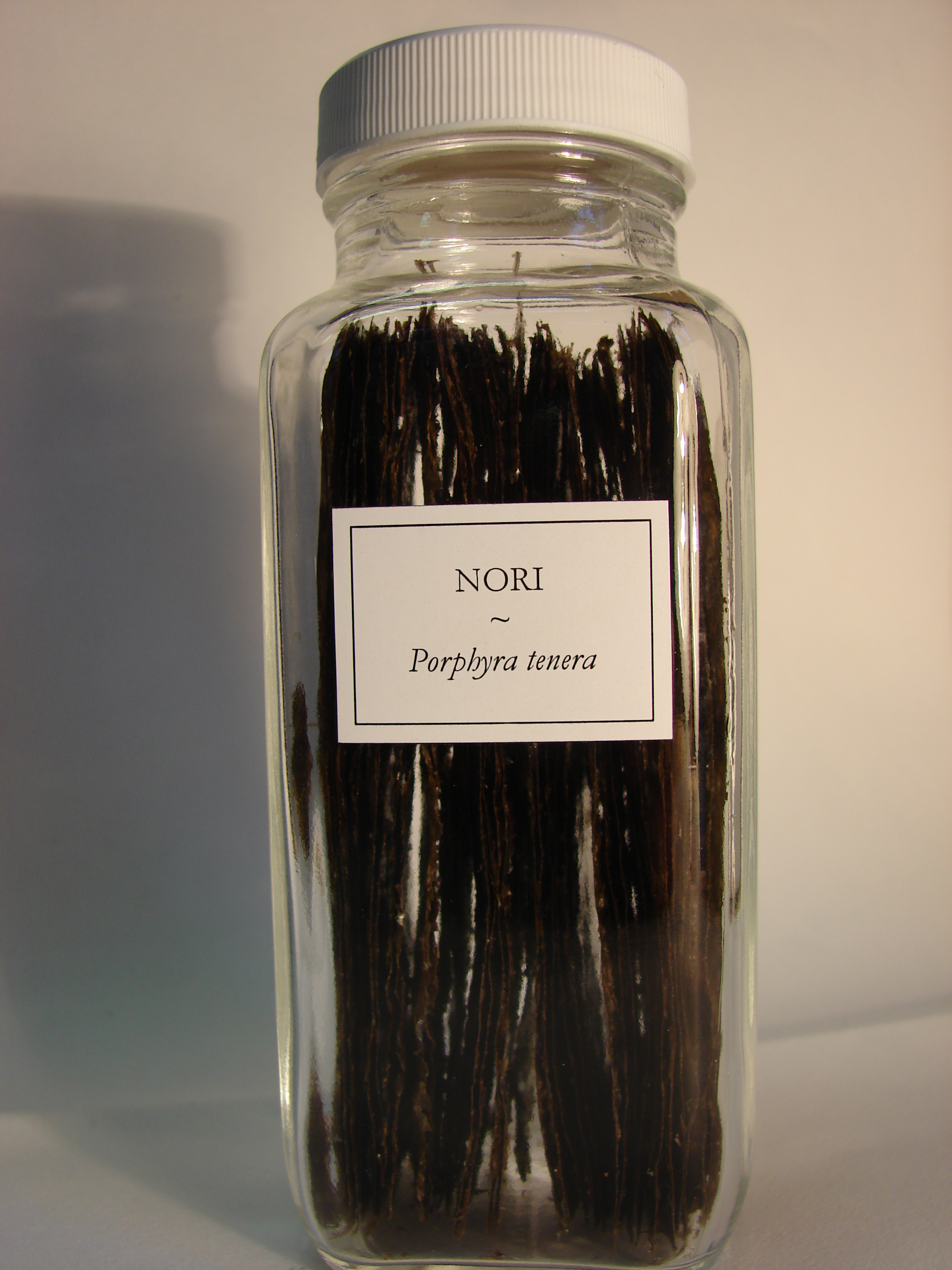

Scientific classification
- Domain: Eukaryota
- Clade: Archaeplastida
- Division: Rhodophyta
- Class: Bangiophyceae
- Order: Bangiales
- Family: Bangiaceae
- Genus: Pyropia
- Species: P. tenera

Binomial name
- Pyropia tenera (Kjellman, 1897)

= Pyropia tenera =

Species of seaweed

Pyropia tenera, also known as gim or nori, is a red algal species in the genus Pyropia. The specific name, tenera, means "delicate" and alludes to its small size. It typically grows to lengths between 20 and 50 cm. It is most typically found in the western Pacific Ocean and the Indian Ocean.

== Mariculture ==
Global aquaculture production of Nori (Pyropia tenera) in thousand tonnes from 1950 to 2022, as reported by the FAO

In Japan, P. tenera (and P. yezoensis) serve as a principal component of dried seaweed food, and has been actively cultivated since ancient times. In Japan, it is most often used in nori, (and in China as zicai, and Korea as gim), and as such is a prime ingredient in sushi. In Wales (and to some degree, England), the species Porphyra umbilicalis is used in the traditional food laverbread.

Like many of the edible seaweed species, it is susceptible to infection by the parasitic oomycete Pythium porphyrae.
