= Pseudobangia corderoi =

Scientific classification
- Clade: Archaeplastida
- Division: Rhodophyta
- Class: Bangiophyceae
- Order: Bangiales
- Family: Bangiaceae
- Genus: Pseudobangia
- Species: P. corderoi

Binomial name
- Pseudobangia corderoi Gamus & Dumilag, 2023

Species of red algae

Pseudobangia corderoi is a species of filamentous red algae of the family Bangiaceae described in 2023.
