= Pseudobangia kaycoleia =

Scientific classification
- Domain: Eukaryota
- Clade: Archaeplastida
- Division: Rhodophyta
- Class: Bangiophyceae
- Order: Bangiales
- Family: Bangiaceae
- Genus: Pseudobangia
- Species: P. kaycoleia

Binomial name
- Pseudobangia kaycoleia K.M.Müller & R.G.Sheath, 2005

Species of red algae

Pseudobangia kaycoleia is a species of filamentous red algae of the family Bangiaceae described in 2005.

== Description ==
The species of alga unbranched, erect thalli may reach up to 1 centimeter in length. The uniseriate filaments are 29.4 to 49.0 micrometres wide, while the multiseriate filaments range from 34.3 (three cells wide) to 83.3 (seven cells wide) micrometers.
