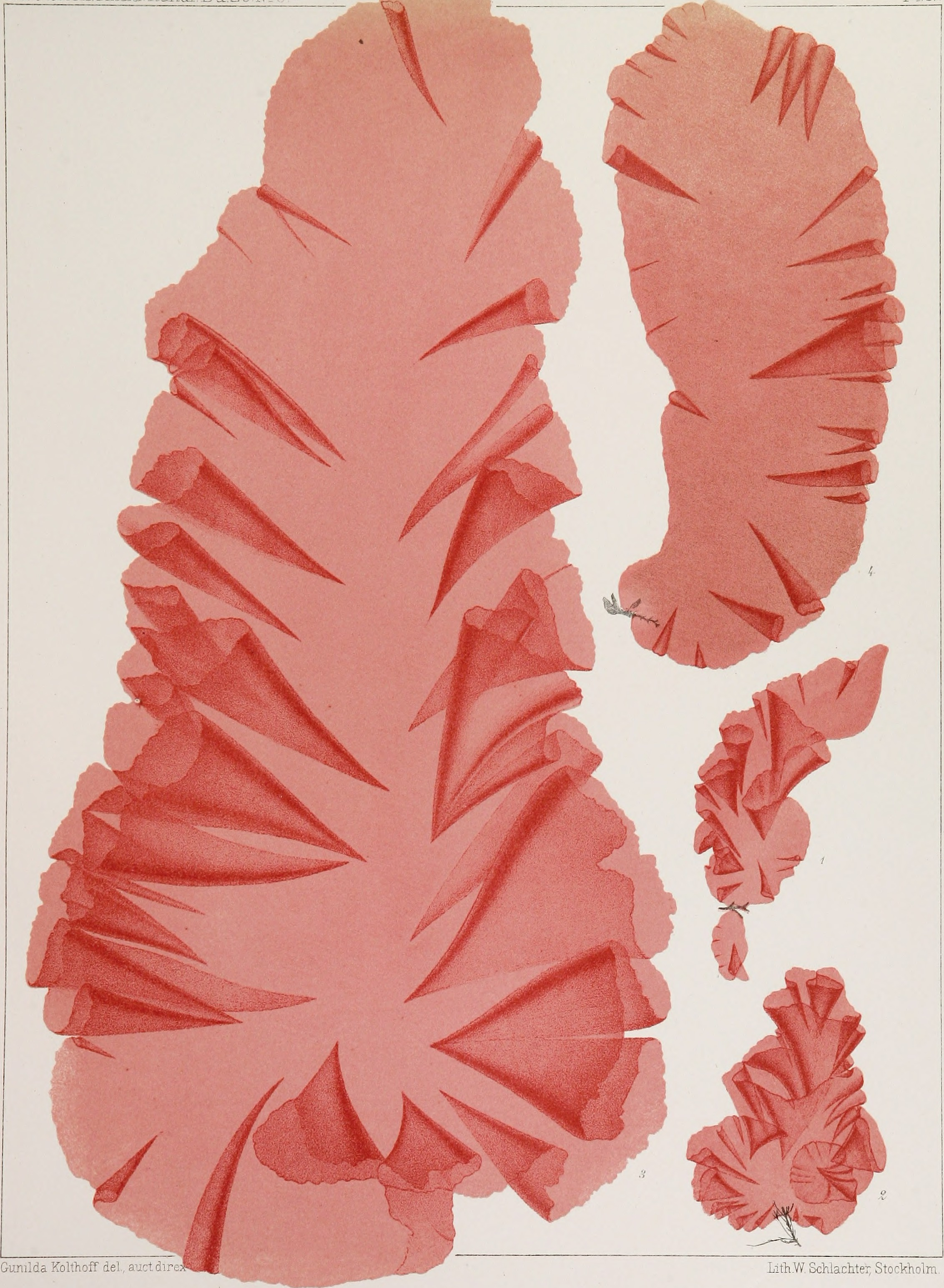
- Four specimens from the Arctic Ocean. The top right specimen is Wildemania abyssicola, while the other three are of Wildemania amplissima.

Scientific classification
- Clade: Archaeplastida
- Division: Rhodophyta
- Class: Bangiophyceae
- Order: Bangiales
- Family: Bangiaceae
- Genus: Wildemania de Toni, 1890

Type species
- Wildemania amplissima (Kjellman) Foslie 1891

Species
- see text

Synonyms
- Diploderma Kjellman, 1883; Diplodermodium Kuntze, 1891

= Wildemania =

Genus of red algae

Wildemania is a genus of foliose red algae of the family Bangiaceae.

== Species ==
Wildemania contains eight species as of 2024.

- Wildemania abyssicola (Kjellman) Mols-Mortensen & J.Brodie, 2012
- Wildemania amplissima (Kjellman) Foslie, 1891
- Wildemania miniata (C.Agardh) Foslie, 1891
- Wildemania norrisii (V.Krishnamurthy) S.C.Lindstrom, 2011
- Wildemania occidentalis (Setchell & Hus) S.C.Lindstrom, 2011
- Wildemania schizophylla (Hollenberg) S.C.Lindstrom
- Wildemania tenuissima (Strömfelt) De Toni, 1897
- Wildemania variegata (Hollenberg) De Toni, 1890
