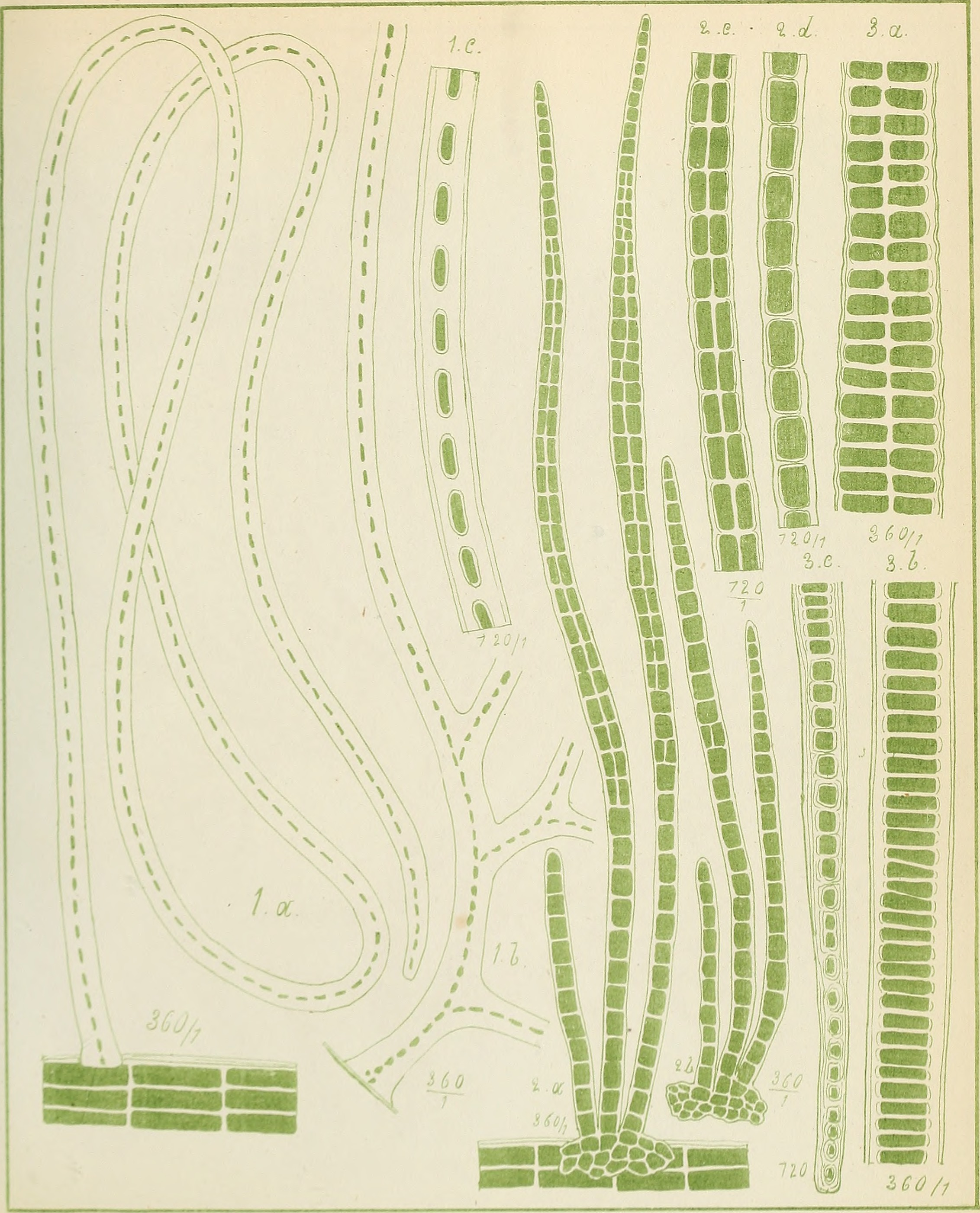
- Bangia spp.

Scientific classification
- Domain: Eukaryota
- Clade: Archaeplastida
- Division: Rhodophyta
- Class: Bangiophyceae
- Subclass: Bangiophycidae
- Order: Bangiales; Nägeli, 1847

Families
- †Rafatazmia?; Bangiaceae; Granufilaceae

= Bangiales =

Bangiales Temporal range: Stenian to present, Disputed Rafatazmia from late Statherian ~1047–0 Ma

Order of red algae

Bangiales is an order of multicellular red algae of the class Bangiophyceae containing the families Bangiaceae, Granufilaceae, and possibly the extinct genus Rafatazmia with one species, Rafatazmia chitrakootensis. They are one of the oldest eukaryotic organisms, possibly dating back to 1.6 billion years old. Many species are used today as food in different cultures worldwide. Their sizes range from microscopic (Bangiomorpha) to up to two meters long (Wildemania occidentalis). Many of its species are affected by Pythium porphyrae, a parasitic oomycete. Similar to many other species of red algae, they reproduce both asexually and sexually. They can be both filamentous or foliose, and are found worldwide.

== History ==
The first categorization of red algae currently placed inside Bangiales was the now-deprecated genus Phyllona by botanist John Hill in 1773. Bangiales itself was first categorized by Carl Nägeli in 1847. However, Bangiaceae had been categorized seventeen years prior in 1830 by Jean Étienne Duby and Bangia even earlier in 1819, by Hans Christian Lyngbye. Between 1819 and 1833, there were many discoveries by botanists like Carl Adolph Agardh and Gaillon; however many early genera were later deprecated and recategorized. No new discoveries were made until the late 19th century, where taxa such as Wildemania and Pyropia were discovered and classified. More modern discoveries include a new family, Granufilaceae, and several new genera, like Clymene, Neoporphyra, and Neothemis. As of 2024, the newest genus, Kuwaitiella, was discovered in 2022. Ongoing research continues to rearrange species, as recent genetic studies have revealed that many early morphologically classified genera were incorrect.

== Human use ==
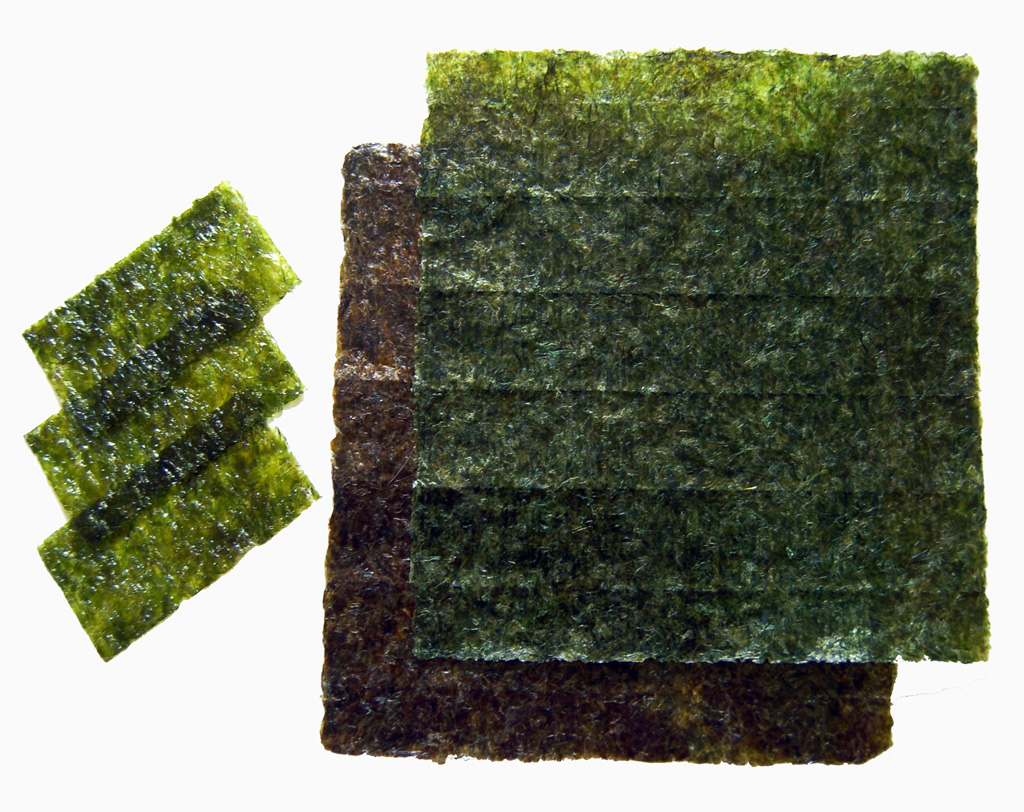
Sheets of nori.

Members of Bangiaceae, one of only two known living classes of Bangiales, are used to make laverbread, rong biển, edible seaweed, zǐcài, gim, and nori. Most edible farmed seaweeds within Bangiaceae are made from two genera of red algae, Porphyra and Pyropia. They are farmed in the ocean in countries including Ireland, the United Kingdom, Japan, Korea, and China. Pyropia is one of the most farmed seaweeds for human consumption. The farming of Pyropia species have been recorded as early as the 17th century, however industrial-scale farms only became common in the 1960s after the availability of artificial seed production and synthetic nets. Specifically, P. tenera and N. yezoensis are mainly used to make most edible seaweed products. Total Pyropia yields have reached three million tonnes as of 2020, with China contributing over three-quarters of the harvests. Pythium porphyrae, a parasitic oomycete, causes red rot disease or akasugare which severely harms seaweed farms in Japan and Korea. There are other pests to these organisms, including Olpidiopsis pyropiae, another oomycete. These diseases cause over US$10 million annually in damages to Pyropia harvests and Pythium porphyrae alone may cause crop losses of up to 20%. Pythium porphyrae has only been naturally observed infecting two species in Bangiales: Pyropia plicata and Neopyropia yezoensis. However, Diehl et al. (2017) have found that the parasite can successfully infect other Pyropia and Porphyra species. Some Porphyra species can be used to make biomaterials for biomedicines. Despite the foliose algae being the most commonly farmed species, the filamentous algae are also sometimes consumed. Both types of consumed algae have nutritional value; nori contains nutrients including proteins, vitamins (especially Vitamin A, Vitamin B1, Vitamin B2, and Vitamin C), minerals (including potassium, calcium, magnesium, iron, and zinc), and fibers. Many seaweed products contain high amounts of heavy elements like iodine and iron, along with toxic elements including cadmium and arsenic. Despite their classification as red algae, the edible species will turn green when prepared. This is evident in products like gim.

== Description ==
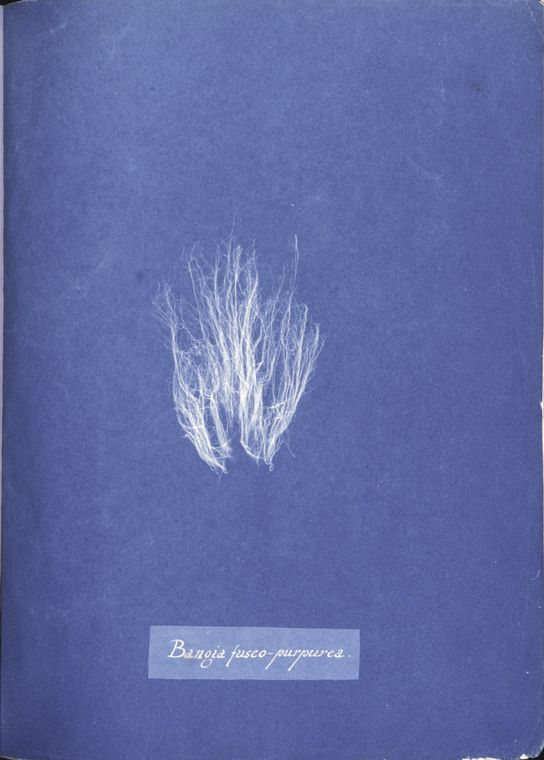
A specimen of Bangia fuscopurpurea, a filamentous species, from the New York Public Library.

As of 2011, there are seven filamentous genera and eight foliose genera, however this has since been increased to fourteen foliose genera.

=== Filamentous genera ===
Filamentous red algae have thin strands. Generally, the filamentous species are much smaller; Bangia's filaments are only a few micrometers thick. The largest filamentous species can grow up to 35 centimeters of length. Despite their small size and thin thalli, they are commercially used as food in East Asian cultures, where they can be known as "红毛菜" (hóng máo cài). They include Bangia, Dione, Kuwaitiella, Minerva, Pseudobangia, Granufilum (in Granufilaceae), and the extinct Bangiomorpha.

=== Foliose genera ===
The foliose species are similar to large, extremely flat sheets of paper. They are one cell thick, and are most widely used in human consumption due to their macroscopic size and easier accessibility. They are also called the "bladed" algae, referring to their extreme thinness. They include Boreophyllum, Clymene, Fuscifolium, Lysithea, Miuraea, Neomiuraea, Neoporphyra, Neopyropia, Neothemis, Phycocalidia, Porphyra, Pyropia, Uedaea, and Wildemania.

== Distribution ==
These red algae are found globally in rivers and oceans. Oceanic species are generally littoral, living near the shore in shallow water or in the intertidal zones. Some species of genera including Porphyra grow on coastal rocks. They are common in temperate areas such as the British Isles, Japan, Korea, and New Zealand, with New Zealand alone hosting over 30 species. Some species, like Wildemania spp., prefer cold water, while other genera, like Phycocalidia, prefer tropical zones.

== Reproduction ==
Red algae of the order Bangiales undergo an unusual triphasic haploid-diploid life cycle; they can alternate between sexual and asexual reproduction. The distinction is primarily caused by environmental factors. They were originally proposed to have two phases in its life cycle, the diploid sporophyte and the haploid gametophyte. The sporophyte stage releases spores into the environment which then grow into full-sized algae, while the gametophyte stage requires two parents to undergo sexual reproduction which leads to the sporophyte stage again. However, these algae were recently discovered to undergo a third, diploid phase of life cycle known as the conchosporophyte. The conchosporophyte is parasitically grown on the sporophyte, and is thus an asexual manner of reproduction which results in an exact copy of its parent's genome. The conchosporophyte was previously believed to be part of the sporophyte, however modern research suggests otherwise. Despite the phylogenetic differences of the filamentous and foliose algae, both types reproduce in this manner.

== Taxonomy ==
Bangiales includes two families and possibly Rafatazmia, for a total of 20 to 22 genera in Bangiaceae, 1 in Granufilaceae, and 1 incertae sedis. Traditionally, Bangiaceae only contained two genera, the filamentous Bangia and the foliose Porphyra. In 2011, there were 15 genera and 185 species, however a large reanalysis in 2020 reorganized many genera which brings the total to 22 to 24 as of 2024.

=== Bangiaceae ===
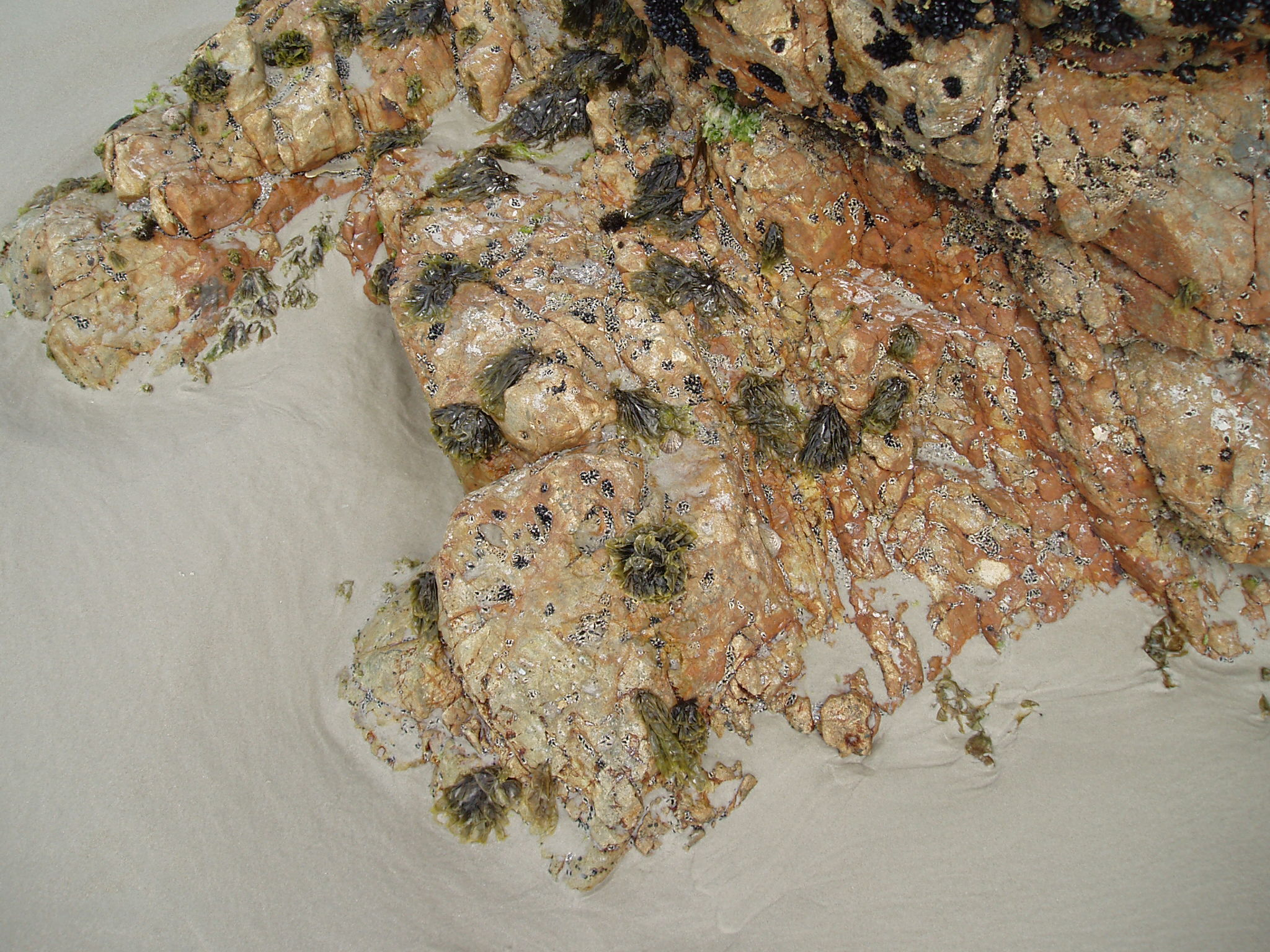
Pyropia plicata, a species of the genus Pyropia that lives in the intertidal zone.

- Bangia Lyngbye
- †Bangiomorpha N.J.Butterfield
- Boreophyllum S.C.Lindstrom, N. Kikuchi, M.Miyata, & Neefus
- Clymene W.A.Nelson
- Dione W.A.Nelson
- Fuscifolium S.C.Lindstrom
- Kuwaitiella A.H.Hasan, P.Van der Aa, F.C.Küpper, D.Al-Bader & A.F.Peters, 2022
- Lysithea W.A.Nelson
- Minerva W.A.Nelson
- Miuraea N.Kikuchi, S.Arai, G.Yoshida, J.A.Shin, & M.Miyata
- Neomiuraea N.Kikuchi, S.Arai, G.Yoshida, J.A.Shin & Miyata, 2018
- Neoporphyra J.Brodie & L.-E.Yang, 2020
- Neopyropia J.Brodie & L.-E.Yang, 2020
- Neothemis A.Vergés & N.Sánchez
- Phycocalidia Santiañez & M.J.Wynne, 2020
- Porphyra C.Agardh
- Porphyrea? Solier (uncertain status)
- Pseudobangia K.M.Müller & R.G.Sheath
- Pyropia J.Agardh
- Spermogonia? Bonnemaison (uncertain status)
- Uedaea J.Brodie & L.-E.Yang, 2020
- Wildemania De Toni

=== Granufilaceae ===
- Granufilum X.F.Zhao, 1995

- Granufilum rivulare X.F.Zhao, 1995

=== Incertae sedis ===
- †Rafatazmia? Bengtson, 2017

- †Rafatazmia chitrakootensis? Bengtson, 2017

== Records ==
If Rafatazmia is confirmed to be included in this order, then it would contain the oldest confirmed multicellular eukaryotic organism, dating to around 1.6 billion years during the Statherian period of the Paleoproterozoic era. In addition, Bangiomorpha is an extinct genus of algae in Bangiaceae containing one species, Bangiomorpha pubescens, which was the first confirmed organism to undergo sexual reproduction approximately one billion years ago during the Stenian period. Modern record-holders include Porphyra purpurea, with 251 genes comprising one of the largest known plastid genomes, and Pyropia tenera, as the globally second-most-farmed seaweed only behind the brown algae Saccharina japonica.

== Sources ==
- Mols-Mortensen, Agnes (2014). The foliose Bangiales (Rhodophyta) in the northern part of the North Atlantic and the relationship with the North Pacific foliose Bangiales – diversity, distribution, phylogeny and phylogeography (Thesis).
- Wehr, John D.; Sheath, Robert G., eds. (2003). Freshwater Algae of North America. doi:10.1016/B978-0-12-741550-5.X5000-4. ISBN 978-0-12-741550-5.
