= Neothemis =

Scientific classification
- Clade: Archaeplastida
- Division: Rhodophyta
- Class: Bangiophyceae
- Order: Bangiales
- Family: Bangiaceae
- Genus: Neothemis; A.Vergés & N.Sánchez, 2015

Type species
- Neothemis ballesterosii (A.Vergés & N.Sánchez) A.Vergés & N.Sánchez, 2015

Species
- see text

Synonyms
- Themis N.Sánchez, A.Vergés, [C.Peteiro,] J.Sutherland & J.Brodie, 2014

Genus of red algae

Neothemis is a genus of foliose red algae of the family Bangiaceae.

== Species ==
Neothemis contains two species as of 2024.

- Neothemis ballesterosii (A.Vergés & N.Sánchez) A.Vergés & N.Sánchez, 2015
- Neothemis iberica (A.Vergés & N.Sánchez) A.Vergés & N.Sánchez, 2015
