= Kuwaitiella =

Scientific classification
- Clade: Archaeplastida
- Division: Rhodophyta
- Class: Bangiophyceae
- Order: Bangiales
- Family: Bangiaceae
- Genus: Kuwaitiella; A.H.Hasan et al., 2022
- Species: K. rubra

Binomial name
- Kuwaitiella rubra A.H.Hasan et al., 2022

Genus of red algae

Kuwaitiella rubra is a species of filamentous red algae of the family Bangiaceae. It is the only species in its genus Kuwaitiella. It was discovered in 2022 by a team of five scientists in Kuwait, giving the name.
