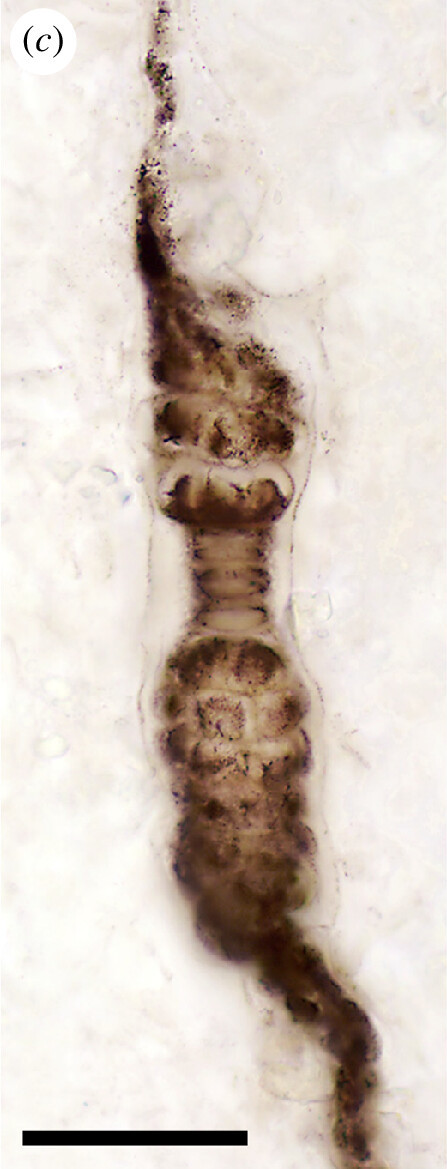

Scientific classification
- Domain: Eukaryota
- Clade: Archaeplastida
- Division: Rhodophyta
- Class: Bangiophyceae
- Order: Bangiales
- Family: Bangiaceae
- Genus: †Bangiomorpha; N.J.Butterfield
- Species: †B. pubescens

Binomial name
- †Bangiomorpha pubescens N.J.Butterfield

= Bangiomorpha =

Bangiomorpha Temporal range: 1047 Ma +13/–17 Ma

Extinct genus of algae

Bangiomorpha pubescens is a species of red algae in the order Bangiales. It is the first known sexually reproducing organism. A multicellular fossil of Bangiomorpha pubescens was recovered from the Hunting Formation in Somerset Island, Canada, that strongly resembles the modern red alga Bangia despite occurring in rocks dating to 1,047 million years ago, during the Stenian period. This species is the oldest example of an organism belonging to an extant phylum. The fossil includes differentiated reproductive cells that are the oldest evidence of sexual reproduction. Sexual reproduction increased genetic variation, which led to an increased rate of evolution and the diversification of eukaryotes.
