= Phycocalidia =

Scientific classification
- Clade: Archaeplastida
- Division: Rhodophyta
- Class: Bangiophyceae
- Order: Bangiales
- Family: Bangiaceae
- Genus: Phycocalidia; Santiañez & M.J.Wynne, 2020

Type species
- Phycocalidia pseudolobata (L.-E.Yang, J.Brodie & Q.-Q.Lu) Santiañez & M.J.Wynne

Species
- See text

Genus of red algae

Phycocalidia is a disputed genus of foliose red algae in the family Bangiaceae.

== Distribution ==
This genus of algae is found in and near waters of India and Southeast Asia.

== Species ==
Phycocalidia contains four species according to WoRMS, however more have been documented in later studies.

=== Confirmed ===
- Phycocalidia acanthophora (E.C.Oliveira & Coll) Santiañez, 2020
- Phycocalidia denticulata (Levring) Santiañez & M.J.Wynne, 2020
- Phycocalidia suborbiculata (Kjellman) Santiañez & M.J.Wynne, 2020
- Phycocalidia tanegashimensis (I.Shinmura) Santiañez, 2020

=== Unconfirmed ===
- Phycocalidia sukshma
- Phycocalidia vietnamensis
- Phycocalidia kanyakumariensis
