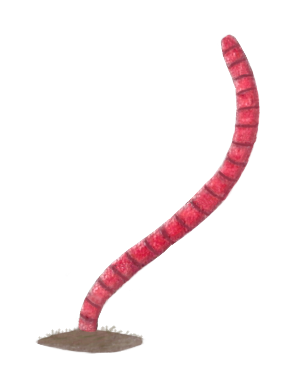
- Reconstruction of Rafatzamia

Scientific classification
- Domain: Eukaryota
- (unranked): Archaeplastida
- Division: Rhodophyta
- Class: Bangiophyceae
- Order: Bangiales?
- Genus: †Rafatazmia Bengtson, 2017

Binomial name
- †Rafatazmia chitrakootensis Bengtson, 2017

= Rafatazmia =

Rafatazmia Temporal range: Late Statherian, ~1600 Ma

Extinct genus of algae

Rafatazmia chitrakootensis, the sole member of the genus Rafatazmia, is a fossil species of filamentous algae described from dolomite obtained from the Vindhya Ranges of central India. It is among the oldest known eukaryotic life forms and dates to about 1600 million years. The genus is named after Rafat Azmi, an Indian paleontologist who controversially discovered other fossils in the same area.

== History ==
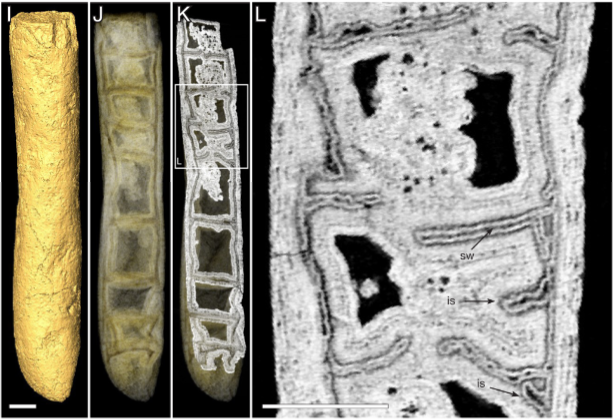
Rafatazmia chitrakootensis.

Some microfossils as well as small shelly fossils were first described by Rafat Azmi in 1998 from Rohtasgarh limestone, and he described them as Cambrian presumably based on conventional ideas on the early evolution of life. Accusations were made against Azmi and fraud was suspected (at a time when the major fraud of the Indian paleontologist Vishwa Jit Gupta had been unearthed). These findings were investigated as it was in gross contradiction to the known age of the regions in question. A re-examination by others in the region failed to find the fossils claimed by him. However a Swedish team collected in another nearby region and examined microfossils and also noted that they clearly were not Cambrian but Proterozoic as expected for the region.

The Vindhyan region is made of older rocks and the presence of fossils raised considerable interest and further studies were carried out and in 2017, these were announced as clear and unquestionably traces of living organisms. The cells have been said to be similar to oscillatoriacean cyanobacteria and probably multicellular red algae (Rhodophyta). It thus pushes back the age of the oldest red alga by about 400 million years to an age of about 1,650 ± 89 (2σ) million years ago. Rafat Azmi's 1998 studies and claims came under a cloud of doubt and were re-examined by the Geological Society of India which claimed in a report that they failed to find the small shelly fossils reported by him. The 2017 studies were based on visits to sites in central India and fresh collections were made by Swedish researchers led by Stefan Bengtson. Their initial studies showed that their fossils were not Cambrian, but over a billion years older. The 2017 studies visualized the filamentous structures using synchrotron-radiation X-ray tomographic microscopy (SRXTM) renderings and attempted to place the affinities of the life-forms as shown by the evidence. Based on their studies Rafatazmia may be the oldest known confirmably eukaryotic fossil organism.

== See also ==
- Ramathallus
