= Boreophyllum =

Scientific classification
- Clade: Archaeplastida
- Division: Rhodophyta
- Class: Bangiophyceae
- Order: Bangiales
- Family: Bangiaceae
- Genus: Boreophyllum; S.C.Lindstrom, N. Kikuchi, M.Miyata & Neefus, 2011

Type species
- Boreophyllumn aestivale (S.C.Lindstrom & Fredericq) S.C.Lindstrom, 2011

Species
- See Species

Genus of red algae

Boreophyllum is a genus of foliose red algae of the family Bangiaceae.

== Species ==
Boreophyllum contains five species as of 2024.

- Boreophyllum aestivale (S.C.Lindstrom & Fredericq) S.C.Lindstrom, 2011
- Boreophyllum aleuticum S.C.Lindstrom & M.R.Lindeberg, 2015
- Boreophyllum ambiguum S.C.Lindstrom, 2015
- Boreophyllum birdiae (Neefus & A.C.Mathieson) Neefus, 2011
- Boreophyllum pseudocrassum (Yamada & Mikami) N.Kikuchi & M.Miyata, 2011
