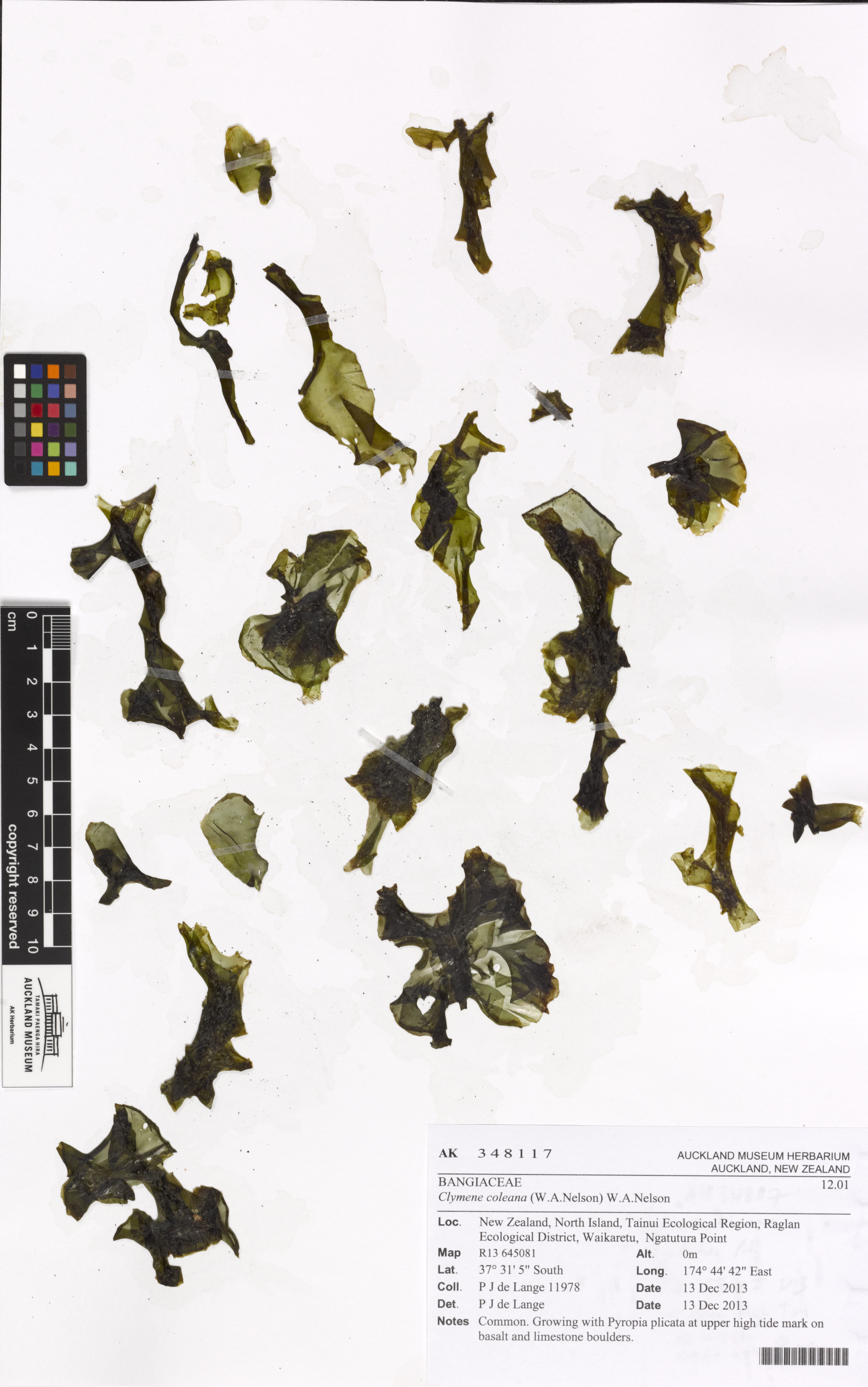
- Specimens of Clymene coleana

Scientific classification
- Domain: Eukaryota
- Clade: Archaeplastida
- Division: Rhodophyta
- Class: Bangiophyceae
- Order: Bangiales
- Family: Bangiaceae
- Genus: Clymene; W.A.Nelson, 2011

Type species
- Clymene coleana (W.A.Nelson) W.A.Nelson, 2011

Species
- See text

= Clymene (alga) =

Genus of red algae

Clymene is a genus of foliose red algae of the family Bangiaceae.

== Species ==
Clymene contains one described and two yet undescribed species as of 2024.

=== Described ===
- Clymene coleana (W.A.Nelson) W.A.Nelson, 2011
- Clymene sutherlandiae W.A.Nelson, 2022

=== Undescribed ===
- Clymene sp. OTA
- Clymene sp. TTS

== Sources ==
- Sutherland; et al. (October 2011). "A New Look at an Ancient Order: Generic Revision of the Bangiales (Rhodophyta)". J. Phycol. 47 (5). Bibcode:2011JPcgy..47.1131S. doi:10.1111/j.1529-8817.2011.01052.x. PMID 27020195. S2CID 2779596.
