= Fuscifolium =

Scientific classification
- Clade: Archaeplastida
- Division: Rhodophyta
- Class: Bangiophyceae
- Order: Bangiales
- Family: Bangiaceae
- Genus: Fuscifolium; S.C.Lindstrom, 2011

Type species
- Fuscifolium papenfussii (V.Krishnamurthy) S.C.Lindstrom, 2011

Species
- See text

Genus of red algae

Fuscifolium is a genus of foliose red algae of the family Bangiaceae.

== Species ==
Fuscifolium contains two species as of 2024:

- Fuscifolium papenfussii (V.Krishnamurthy) S.C.Lindstrom, 2011
- Fuscifolium tasa (Yendo) S.C.Lindstrom, 2011
