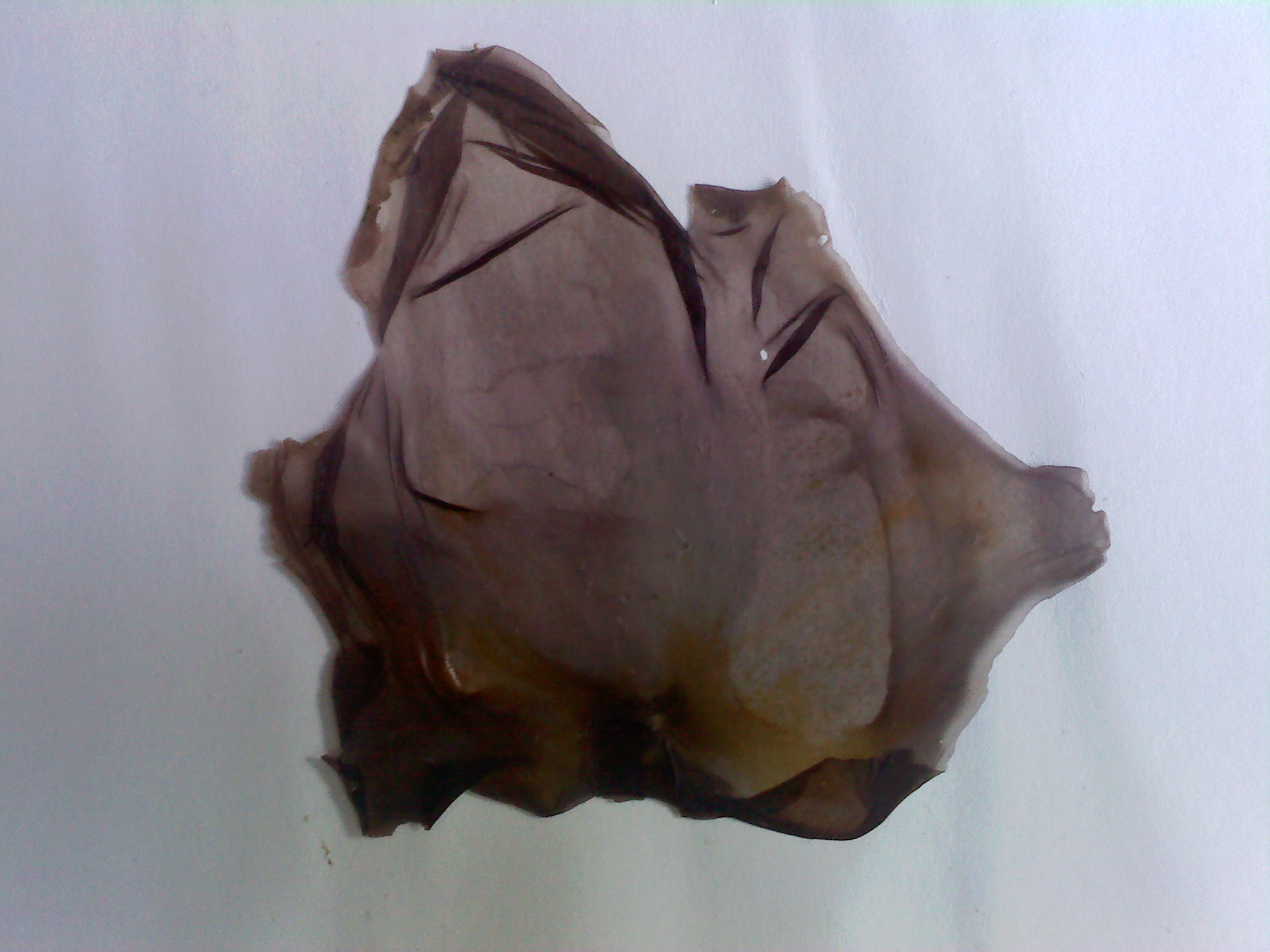

Scientific classification
- Domain: Eukaryota
- Clade: Archaeplastida
- Division: Rhodophyta
- Class: Bangiophyceae
- Order: Bangiales
- Family: Bangiaceae
- Genus: Porphyra
- Species: P. umbilicalis

Binomial name
- Porphyra umbilicalis (L.) Kützing

= Porphyra umbilicalis =

Species of seaweed

Porphyra umbilicalis, commonly known as laver, is a species of seaweed in the genus Porphyra. It is smooth in texture and forms delicate, sheetlike thalli, reaching 25 centimetres (10 in) long and often clinging to rocks. Porphyra is classified as red algae; it tends to be a brownish colour, but boils down to a dark green pulp when prepared. It is unusual amongst seaweeds because the fronds are only one cell thick.

It is commonly found around the west coast of Great Britain and east coast of Ireland along the Irish Sea, where it is also known as "sleabhac" or "slake". It is edible and used to make laverbread. In some parts of the United Kingdom it is classified as critically endangered following steep decline of its population in previously established habitats.

== See also ==
- Kathleen Mary Drew-Baker
