= Uedaea =

Scientific classification
- Clade: Archaeplastida
- Division: Rhodophyta
- Class: Bangiophyceae
- Order: Bangiales
- Family: Bangiaceae
- Genus: Uedaea; J.Brodie & L.-E.Yang, 2020
- Species: U. onoi

Binomial name
- Uedaea onoi J.Brodie & L.-E.Yang, 2020

Genus of red algae

Uedaea onoi is a species of foliose red algae of the family Bangiaceae. It is the only species in its genus Uedaea.
