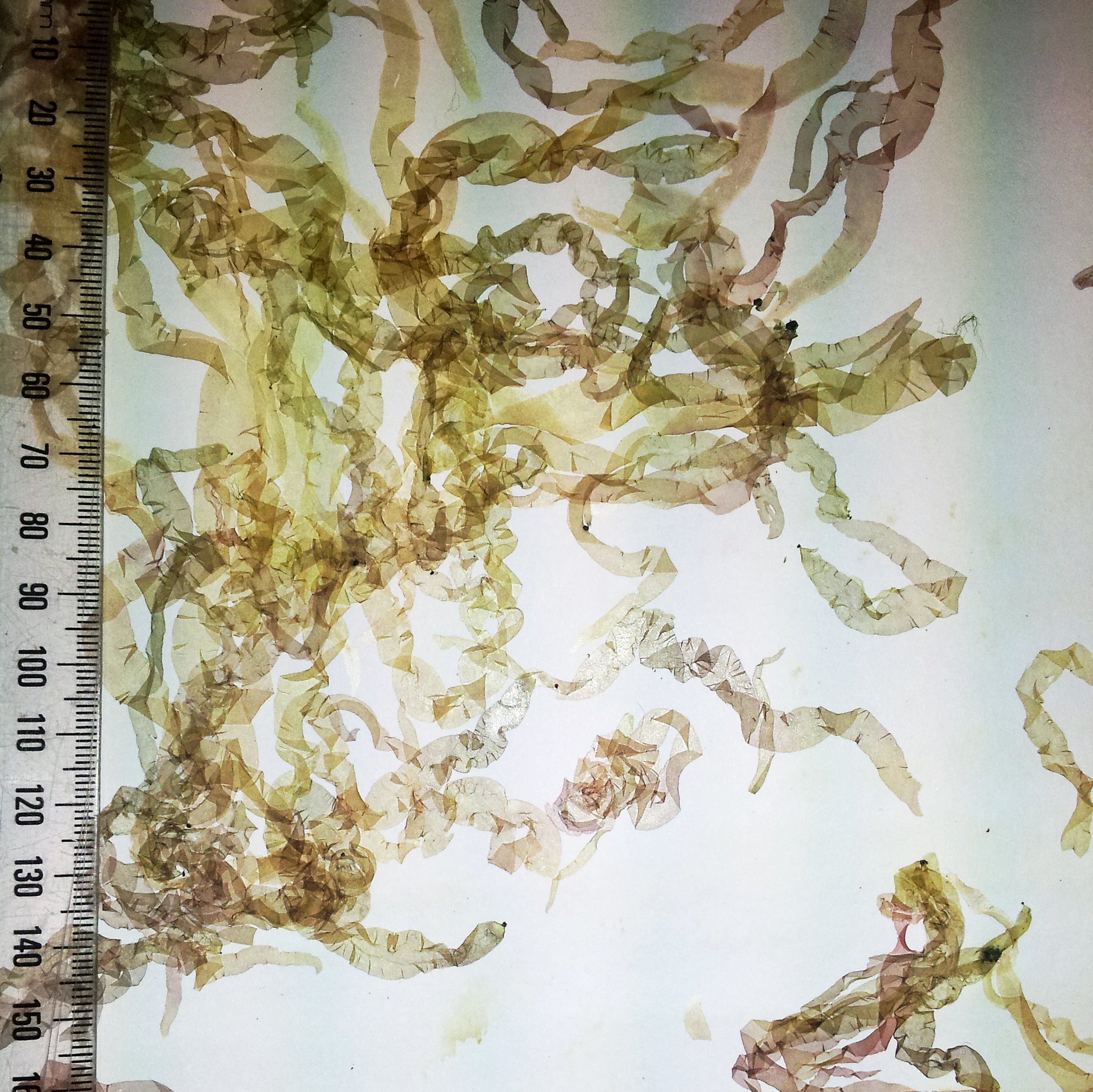
- Pyropia virididentata

Scientific classification
- Domain: Eukaryota
- Clade: Archaeplastida
- Division: Rhodophyta
- Class: Bangiophyceae
- Order: Bangiales
- Family: Bangiaceae; Duby, 1830

Genera
- Bangia Lyngbye; †Bangiomorpha N.J.Butterfield; Boreophyllum S.C.Lindstrom, N. Kikuchi, M.Miyata, & Neefus; Calidia L.-E.Yang & J.Brodie, 2020; Clymene W.A.Nelson; Dione W.A.Nelson; Fuscifolium S.C.Lindstrom; Kuwaitiella A.H.Hasan, P.Van der Aa, F.C.Küpper, D.Al-Bader & A.F.Peters, 2022; Lysithea W.A.Nelson; Minerva W.A.Nelson; Miuraea N.Kikuchi, S.Arai, G.Yoshida, J.A.Shin, & M.Miyata; Neomiuraea N.Kikuchi, S.Arai, G.Yoshida, J.A.Shin & Miyata, 2018; Neoporphyra J.Brodie & L.-E.Yang, 2020; Neopyropia J.Brodie & L.-E.Yang, 2020; Neothemis A.Vergés & N.Sánchez; Phycocalidia Santiañez & M.J.Wynne, 2020; Porphyra C.Agardh; Porphyrea? Solier (Uncertain status); Pseudobangia K.M.Müller & R.G.Sheath; Pyropia J.Agardh; Spermogonia Bonnemaison; Themis N.Sánchez, A.Vergés, C.Peteiro, J.Sutherland, & J.Brodie; Uedaea J.Brodie & L.-E.Yang, 2020; Wildemania De Toni

= Bangiaceae =

Bangiaceae Temporal range: ~1047–0 Ma

Family of algae

Bangiaceae is a family of red algae in the order Bangiales. It contains laver, used to make laverbread, and various species in the genus of Pyropia are used to make nori.

== Genera ==
Bangiaceae currently contains between 20 and 22 accepted genera, with all but one extant.

- Bangia Lyngbye
- †Bangiomorpha N.J.Butterfield
- Boreophyllum S.C.Lindstrom, N. Kikuchi, M.Miyata, & Neefus
- Clymene W.A.Nelson
- Dione W.A.Nelson
- Fuscifolium S.C.Lindstrom
- Kuwaitiella A.H.Hasan, P.Van der Aa, F.C.Küpper, D.Al-Bader & A.F.Peters, 2022
- Lysithea W.A.Nelson
- Minerva W.A.Nelson
- Miuraea N.Kikuchi, S.Arai, G.Yoshida, J.A.Shin, & M.Miyata
- Neomiuraea N.Kikuchi, S.Arai, G.Yoshida, J.A.Shin & Miyata, 2018
- Neoporphyra J.Brodie & L.-E.Yang, 2020
- Neopyropia J.Brodie & L.-E.Yang, 2020
- Neothemis A.Vergés & N.Sánchez
- Phycocalidia Santiañez & M.J.Wynne, 2020
- Porphyra C.Agardh
- Porphyrea? Solier (uncertain status)
- Pseudobangia K.M.Müller & R.G.Sheath
- Pyropia J.Agardh
- Spermogonia? Bonnemaison (uncertain status)
- Uedaea J.Brodie & L.-E.Yang, 2020
- Wildemania De Toni
