= Minerva aenigmata =

Scientific classification
- Domain: Eukaryota
- Clade: Archaeplastida
- Division: Rhodophyta
- Class: Bangiophyceae
- Order: Bangiales
- Family: Bangiaceae
- Genus: Minerva; W.A.Nelson, 2005
- Species: M. aenigmata

Binomial name
- Minerva aenigmata W.A.Nelson, 2005

Species of red algae

Minerva aenigmata is a species of filamentous red algae of the family Bangiaceae. It is the only species in the genus Minerva.
