= Pseudobangia =

Scientific classification
- Clade: Archaeplastida
- Division: Rhodophyta
- Class: Bangiophyceae
- Order: Bangiales
- Family: Bangiaceae
- Genus: Pseudobangia; K.M.Müller & R.G.Sheath, 2005

Type species
- Pseudobangia kaycoleia K.M.Müller & R.G.Sheath, 2005

Species
- See text

Genus of red algae

Pseudobangia is a genus of filamentous red algae of the family Bangiaceae.

== Species ==
Pseudobangia contains two species as of 2024.

- Pseudobangia corderoi Gamus & Dumilag, 2023
- Pseudobangia kaycoleia K.M.Müller & R.G.Sheath, 2005
