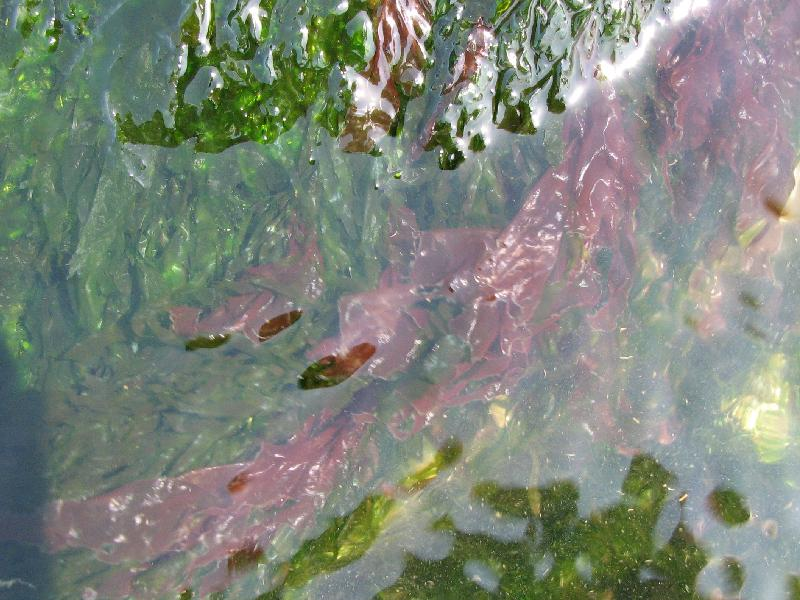
- Neopyropia yezoensis

Scientific classification
- Clade: Archaeplastida
- Division: Rhodophyta
- Class: Bangiophyceae
- Order: Bangiales
- Family: Bangiaceae
- Genus: Neopyropia; J.Brodie & L.-E.Yang, 2020

Species
- see text

= Neopyropia =

Genus of red algae

Neopyropia is a disputed genus of foliose red algae of the family Bangiaceae described in 2020.

== Species ==
As of 2024, the genus contains 12 confirmed species and 11 unconfirmed species.

=== Confirmed ===
- Neopyropia drachii (Feldmann) J.Brodie, 2020
- Neopyropia ishigecola (A.Miura) L.-E.Yang & J.Brodie, 2020
- Neopyropia kinositae (Y.Yamada & Tak.Tanaka) L.-E.Yang & J.Brodie, 2020
- Neopyropia koreana (M.S.Hwang & I.K.Lee) L.-E.Yang & J.Brodie, 2020
- Neopyropia leucosticta (Thuret) L.-E.Yang & J.Brodie, 2020
- Neopyropia parva (A.Vergés & N.Sánchez) L.-E.Yang & J.Brodie, 2020
- Neopyropia pulchella (Ackland, J.A.West, J. L.Scott & Zuccarello) L.-E.Yang & J.Brodie, 2020
- Neopyropia rakiura (W.A.Nelson) L.-E.Yang & J.Brodie, 2020
- Neopyropia retorta (S.M.Kim, H.G.Choi & H.S.Kim) L.-E.Yang & J.Brodie, 2020
- Neopyropia spatulata (T.Bray, Neefus & A.C.Mathieson) L.-E.Yang & J.Brodie, 2020
- Neopyropia submarina (Y.H.Koh & M.S.Kim) L.-E.Yang & J.Brodie, 2020
- Neopyropia tenuipedalis (A.Miura) L.-E.Yang & J.Brodie, 2020

=== Unconfirmed ===
These species are noted in recent scientific journals but not WoRMS. Four species listed below have not been formally described as of 2022.

- Neopyropia sp. DRB
- Neopyropia elongata
- Neopyropia fucicola
- Neopyropia katadae
- Neopyropia kuniedae
- Neopyropia lacerata
- Neopyropia sp. LYCN190
- Neopyropia moriensis
- Neopyropia novae-angliae
- Neopyropia sp. P10
- Neopyropia sp. STI
- Neopyropia tenera
- Neopyropia yezoensis (Ueda) L.-E.Yang & J.Brodie, 2020 (Note: The most recent consensus is that Neopyropia yezoensis belongs in Neopyropia (L.-E.Yang & J.Brodie, 2020), however WoRMS documents both this species and Pyropia yezoensis, its previous classification, separately.)
