= Goniotrichum =

Scientific classification
- Domain: Eukaryota
- Clade: Archaeplastida
- Division: Rhodophyta
- Class: Bangiophyceae
- Order: Goniotrichales
- Family: Goniotrichaceae
- Genus: Goniotrichum; Skuja, 1939

Species
- See text

Genus of algae

Goniotrichum is a disputed (Note: According to World Register of Marine Species, Goniotrichum is currently unaccepted and instead merged into Erythrotrichia, however, Goniotrichales and Goniotrichaceae, its monotypic parent taxa, are accepted. However, the U.S. Fish and Wildlife Service continues to classify it as a valid taxon.) genus of red algae in the monotypic order Goniotrichales and class Bangiophyceae.

== Species ==
If accepted, Goniotrichum contains four species.

- Goniotrichales
  - Goniotrichaceae
    - Goniotrichum
      - Goniotrichum alsidii
      - Goniotrichum ceramicola
      - Goniotrichum cornu-cervi
      - Goniotrichum elegans
