= Edward Morell Holmes =

British botanist and bryologist (1843–1930)

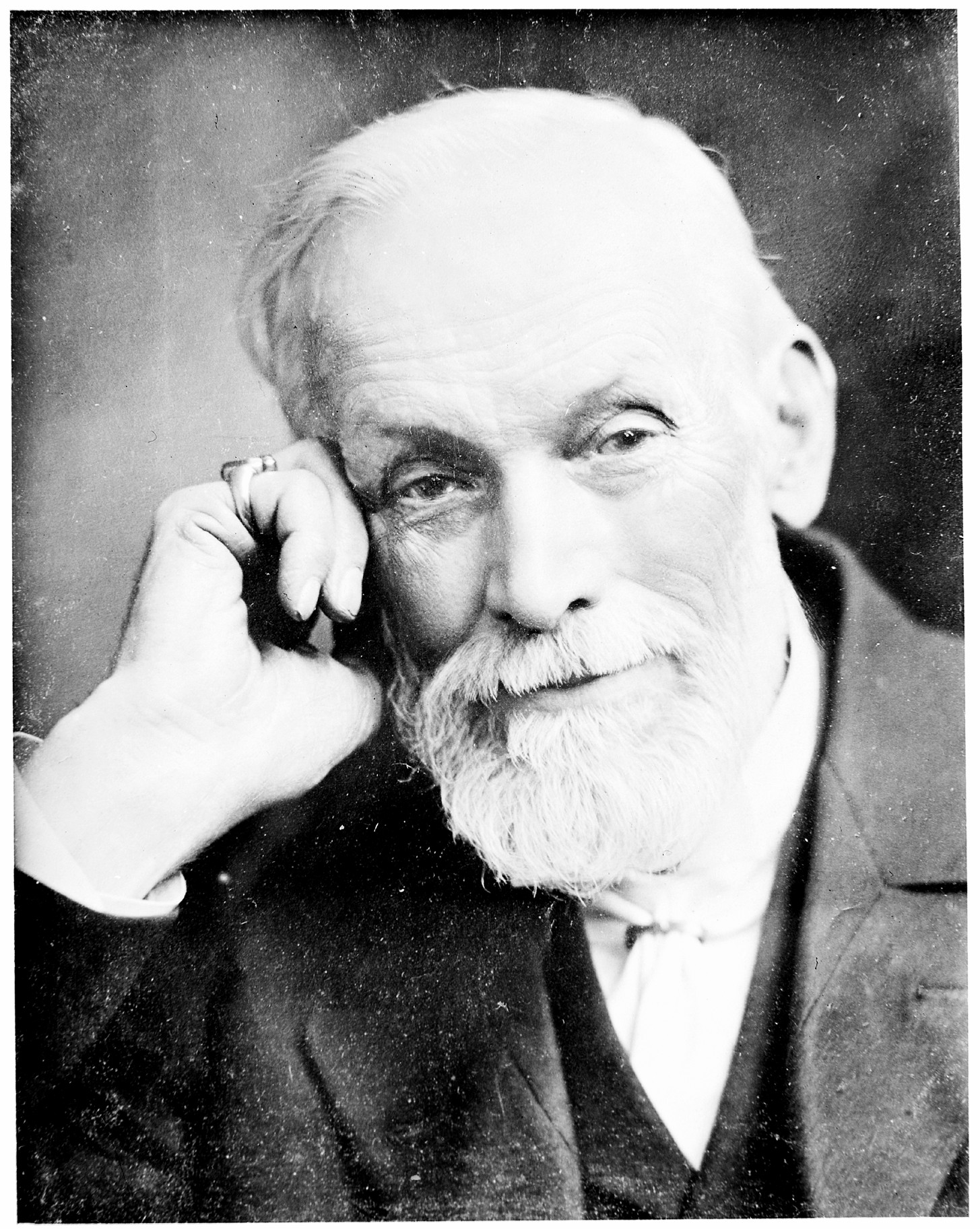
- Born: 29 January 1843; Wendover
- Died: 10 September 1930 (aged 87); Sevenoaks
- Citizenship: United Kingdom
- Awards: Flückiger Medal (1897)
- Scientific career
- Fields: botany
- Author abbrev. (botany): Holmes

Edward Morell Holmes FLS (29 January 1843 – 10 September 1930) was a British botanist, curator and lecturer in materia medica. Most of the specimens he collected are marine algae, lichens, or bryophytes.

== Early life and education ==
Holmes was educated at the Grammar School in Boston, Lincolnshire and the Grammar School in Wimborne Minster. At the age of 14 he was apprenticed to Mr. S. S. Hayward, a pharmacist in Cheyne Walk, Chelsea, London. He studied pharmacy at the Pharmaceutical Society's school in Bloomsbury Square, walking from Chelsea to attend morning lectures. He passed the Minor examination to qualify as a Chemist and Druggist. He then worked for Mr T.Vicary in Plymouth, and while there collected a herbarium of British plants which won the Society's bronze medal in 1863. He passed the Society's Major examination to qualify as a Pharmaceutical Chemist in May 1864.

== Career ==
Holmes worked in London in 1863 and 1864, first as assistant successively to Alsop & Quiller, Sloane Square, and then Mr. G. Tarde, Lamb's Conduit Street. He then returned to Plymouth, and, after a short time with his earlier employer Mr. Vicary, he started his own business at 2 Arundel Crescent. After six years, he sold the business and came to work for Wright, Seller & Layman in London, as head of their perfumery department. However, after three months he left to become Curator of the Pharmaceutical Society's Museum in November 1872. He remained in the post for 50 years until his retirement in 1922, after which he was styled emeritus curator until his death in 1930.He systematised the museum and compiled a catalogue of it which was published in 1878, and later compiled a catalogue of the Hanbury Herbarium. From 1873 to 1876 he was a lecturer on botany at Westminster Hospital Medical School. From 1887 to 1890 he was a lecturer on materia medica at the Pharmaceutical Society. He published more than 300 articles on drugs and medicinal plants.

Though Holmes collected British and Irish plants, his papers also deal with taxa from Africa, Asia and the Americas and some with British insects.

His mosses are at Cambridge, and his liverworts are at the National Museum and Gallery of Wales in Cardiff. His lichens are in individual glass-topped boxes at Nottingham (with other material that he collected dispersed in many other herbaria dispersed elsewhere in Britain), and his algae are at Birmingham. His letters are at Kew and the Linnean Society, and the Wellcome Institute of the History of Medicine Library in London also has letters and manuscripts.

Holmes edited and distributed two exsiccatae, one under the title Algae Britannicae rariores exsiccatae, curante E. M. Holmes (1883-1910).

== Honours ==
He was a Fellow of the Linnean Society. He was awarded the Fluckiger Medal in 1897 and the Pharmaceutical Society's Hanbury Gold Medal in 1915, both in recognition of his contribution to the field.He was President of the British Pharmaceutical Conference in 1900.

== Personal life ==
In 1882, he married Catherine "Kate" Appleford (b. 1842), who also collected British plants. In 1921 an automobile hit him, necessitating the amputation of part of one leg.In 1935, she donated his papers to the Wellcome Library. There were no children from the marriage.
