= Mikael Heggelund Foslie =

Norwegian botanist and algaeologist (1855–1909)

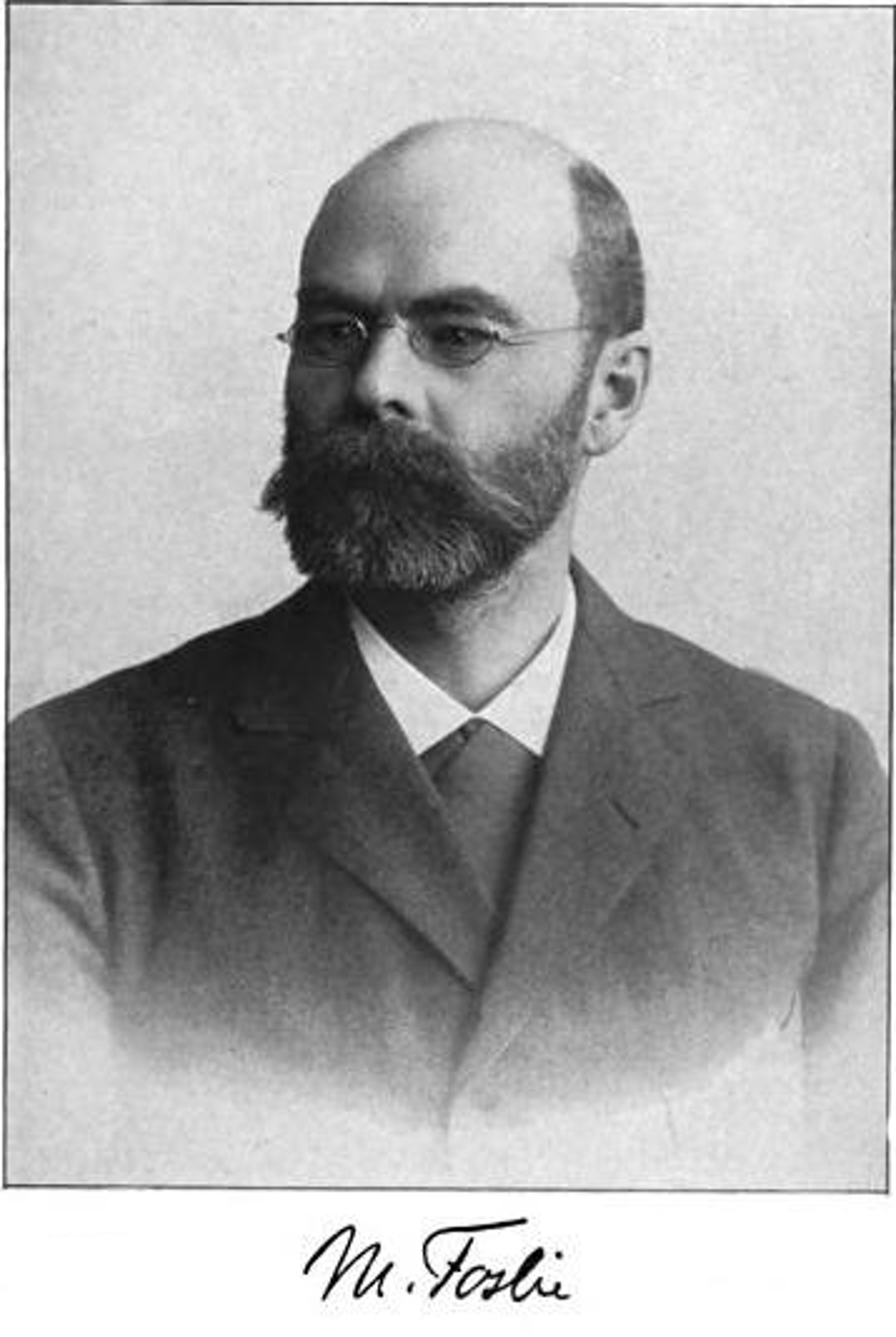
Mikael Foslie c. 1911

Mikael Heggelund Foslie (21 October 1855 – 9 November 1909) was a Norwegian botanist and algaeologist. Foslie was curator of the Royal Norwegian Scientific Society Museum (now NTNU University Museum) in Trondheim.

== Biography ==
He was born in Borge Municipality in the Lofoten Islands of Nordland, Norway. During his childhood, he developed an interest in natural history and in collecting plants and animals. Foslie worked in the Norwegian telegraph service from 1874 until 1885, first in the Lofoten Islands, then in Oslo. He was 29 in 1885 when he began his first full-time scientific position as a curator at the Tromsø University Museum in Tromsø. With a travel grant from the university, he studied in Great Britain and France. He later visited biological stations in the Netherlands, England and Scotland. Foslie then moved to the Museum operated by the Royal Norwegian Society of Sciences and Letters at Trondheim in 1892, where he remained until his death in 1909. Ín 1950 Olav Gjærevoll issued the exsiccata M. Foslie: Lithothamnia selecta exsiccata distributing specimens collected by M. Foslie.

Foslie contributed an algal collection named Algae Norvegicae to the Ulster Museum in Belfast, Northern Ireland. This collection was donated to the Ulster Museum by The Queen's University of Belfast in 1968. The specimens have been catalogued into the main collection in the Ulster Museum catalogued: F10319 - F10336. It is assumed that this refers to Mikael Heggelund Foslie. The specimens bear dates from the 1880s to 1890s.

Mikael Foslie was a member of the Science Society in Kristiania (now the Norwegian Academy of Science and Letters) from 1891 and of the Royal Norwegian Society of Sciences and Letters from 1892.

== Publications ==
- Foslie, M., 1884. Description of new species, edited in Wittrock & Nordstedt, Algae exsiccatae, fasc. 13-14 - Bot. Notiser 124 - 125.
- Foslie, M., 1899. A visit to Roundstone in April. Ir. Nat. J. 8: 175 - 180.

== Other sources ==
- Kertland, M.P.H. 1967. Some early algal collections in the Queen's University Herbarium. Ir. Nat. J. 15: 346 - 349.
- Thor, E., Johansen, S. and Nielsen, L.S. 2005. The collection of botanical letters to Mikael H. Foslie in the Gunnerus Library: a catalogue. Gunneria 78:7 - 22.
- Woelkerling, W.J. 1993. Type collections of Corallinales (Rhodophyta) in the Foslie Herbarium (TRH). Gunneria 67: 1289.
- Woelkerling, W.J., Gustavsen, G., Myklebost, H.E., Prestø, T., Såstad, S.M. 2005. The coralline red algal herbarium of Mikael Foslie: revised catalogue with analyses. Gunneria 77: 1–625.
