= Gim (food) =

Korean edible seaweed

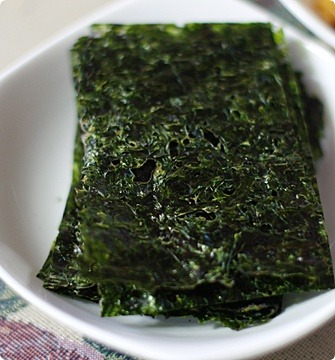
- Gim sheets
- Alternative names: Kim, laver, Korean laver
- Type: Edible seaweed
- Place of origin: Korea
- Region or state: East Asia
- Associated cuisine: Korean cuisine
- Main ingredients: Red algae
- Similar dishes: Nori

Korean name
- Hangul: 김
- RR: gim
- MR: kim
- IPA: [kim]

Gim (Korean: 김), also romanized as kim, is a generic term for a group of edible seaweeds dried to be used as an ingredient in Korean cuisine, consisting of various species in the genera Pyropia and Porphyra, including P. tenera, P. yezoensis, P. suborbiculata, P. pseudolinearis, P. dentata, and P. seriata.

Along with miyeok and dasima, gim is one of the most widely cultivated and consumed types of seaweed in Korea. The dried sheets of gim are often rolled to wrap and be eaten with rice. Gimbap is a dish in which gim is not only rolled with rice, but also meat, fish, or vegetables. Gim also can be eaten without rice by roasting with sesame oil or frying and cutting it to make side dishes (banchan) such as bugak.

Due to the growing popularity of South Korean gim, it now accounts for approximately 70% of the global dried seaweed market. Major export markets include the United States, Japan, and China.

== History ==
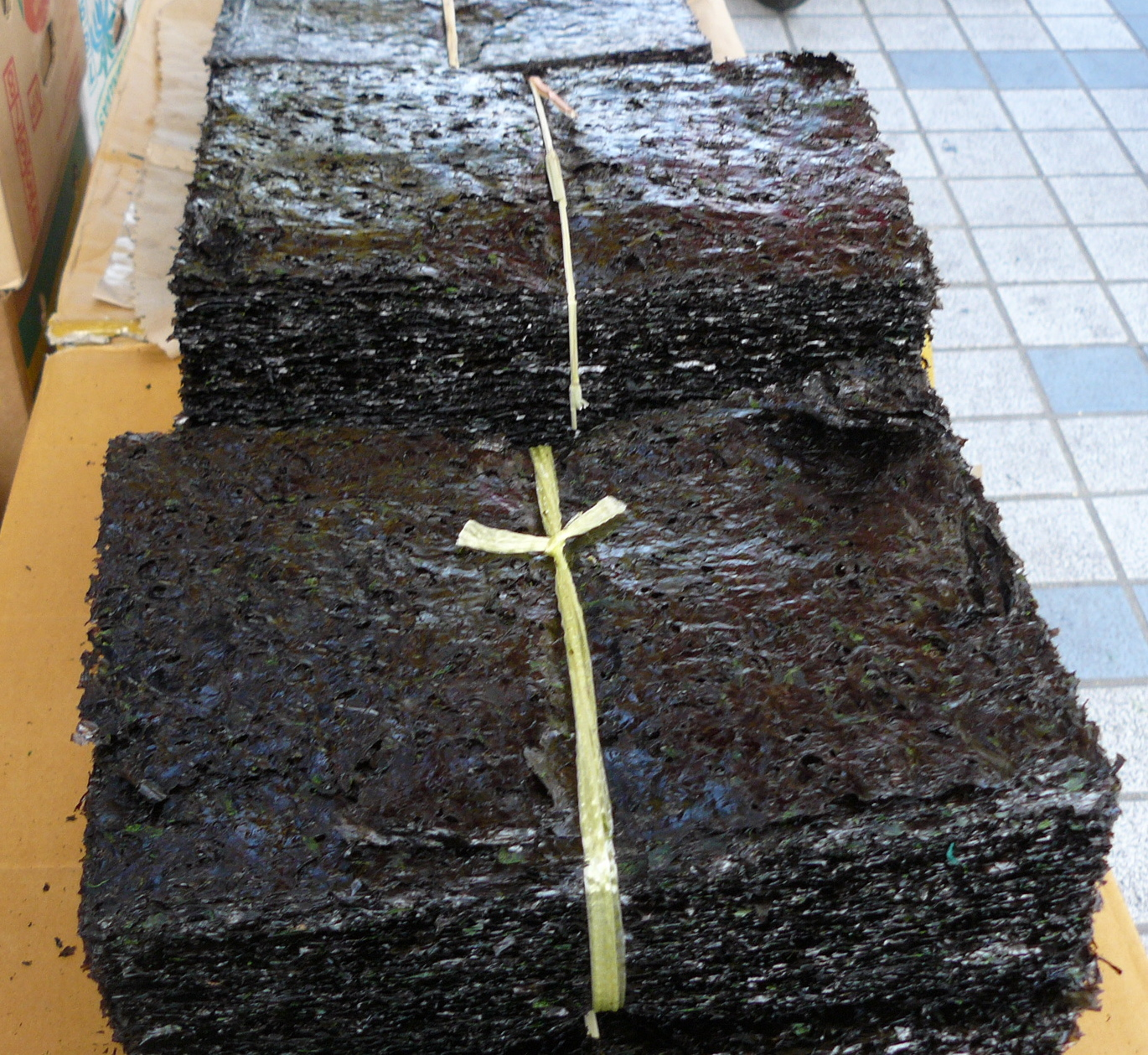
Gim sheets

The earliest mention of edible seaweed in Korea is recorded in the Memorabilia of the Three Kingdoms (1280s); this text, created during the Goryeo era, documents the history of the Three Kingdoms period of Korean history between 57 BCE and 668 CE. The book contains passages that say people of the Silla period would use gim for part of their dowries. It is conjectured that the gim of this period was harvested from rocks and driftwood rather than being cultivated.

Gim was later mentioned numerous times in the Veritable Records of the Joseon Dynasty. Throughout the record, gim is referred as 海衣, meaning sea cloth or sheet.

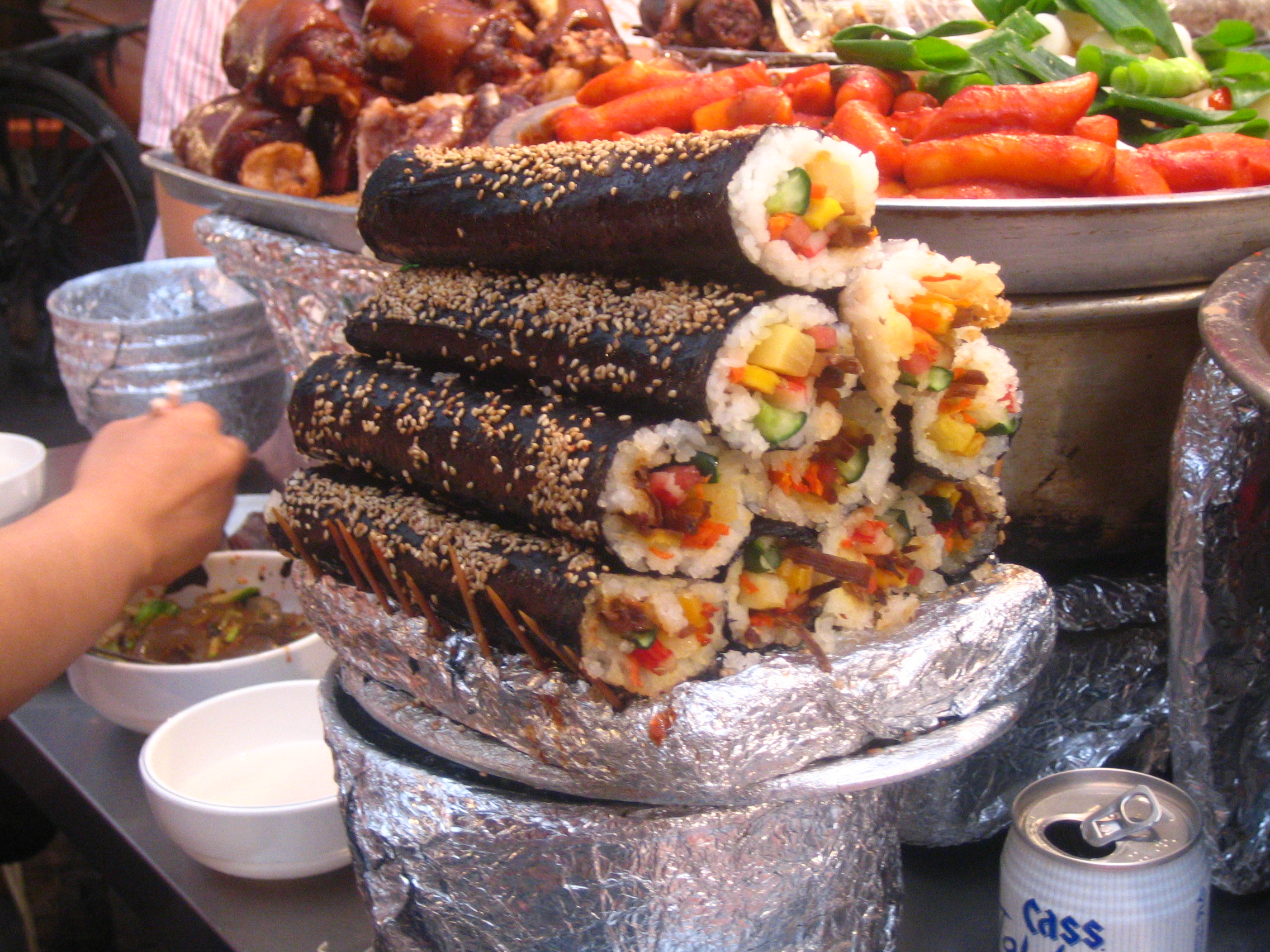
Gimbap is wrapped with gim

In the record, the geographical survey conducted during the regime of the King Sejong the Great described gim as the representative product of Chungcheong, Gyeongsang, and Jeolla Provinces. The record showed how King Seonjo was urged to soothe the hardship of the country's eastern coastal people who were required to produce and submit gim as a royal offering. The record also told the story of how King Hyojong suspended the royal submission of gim upon hearing that a single piece of gim cost 20 pieces of cotton. According to the record, people strictly had to submit gim as a royal offering by a specific size. This led many people to glue a piece of gim on a frame using saliva or other means to fit the size. King Jeongjo, citing that such practice was bad for hygiene, firmly warned the governors of the provinces to not enforce specific offering sizes for gim.

Gim was also mentioned in non-royal literature.

The sheet of gim was described in Baekheonjip (백헌집; 白軒集), where the author Yi Kyŏngsŏk (이경석; 1595–1671) wrote the poem about receiving gim as a gift from his belated acquaintance and comparing its thinness to paper.

In Seonghosaseol (Korean: 성호사설; Hanja: 星湖僿說), the encyclopedia written by the Joseon scholar Yi Ik who lived from 1681 to 1764, the author described that gim, reddish algae growing on the rocks of sea, was processed into a sheet.

The method of seasoning seaweed with sesame oil was recorded in a cookbook in the 19th century of the Joseon dynasty, Siuijeonseo: "...spread sesame oil mixed with red pepper powder and sesame seeds. After that, sprinkle sesame seed or pine nut powder, then dry and roast it before serving".

=== Cultivation ===
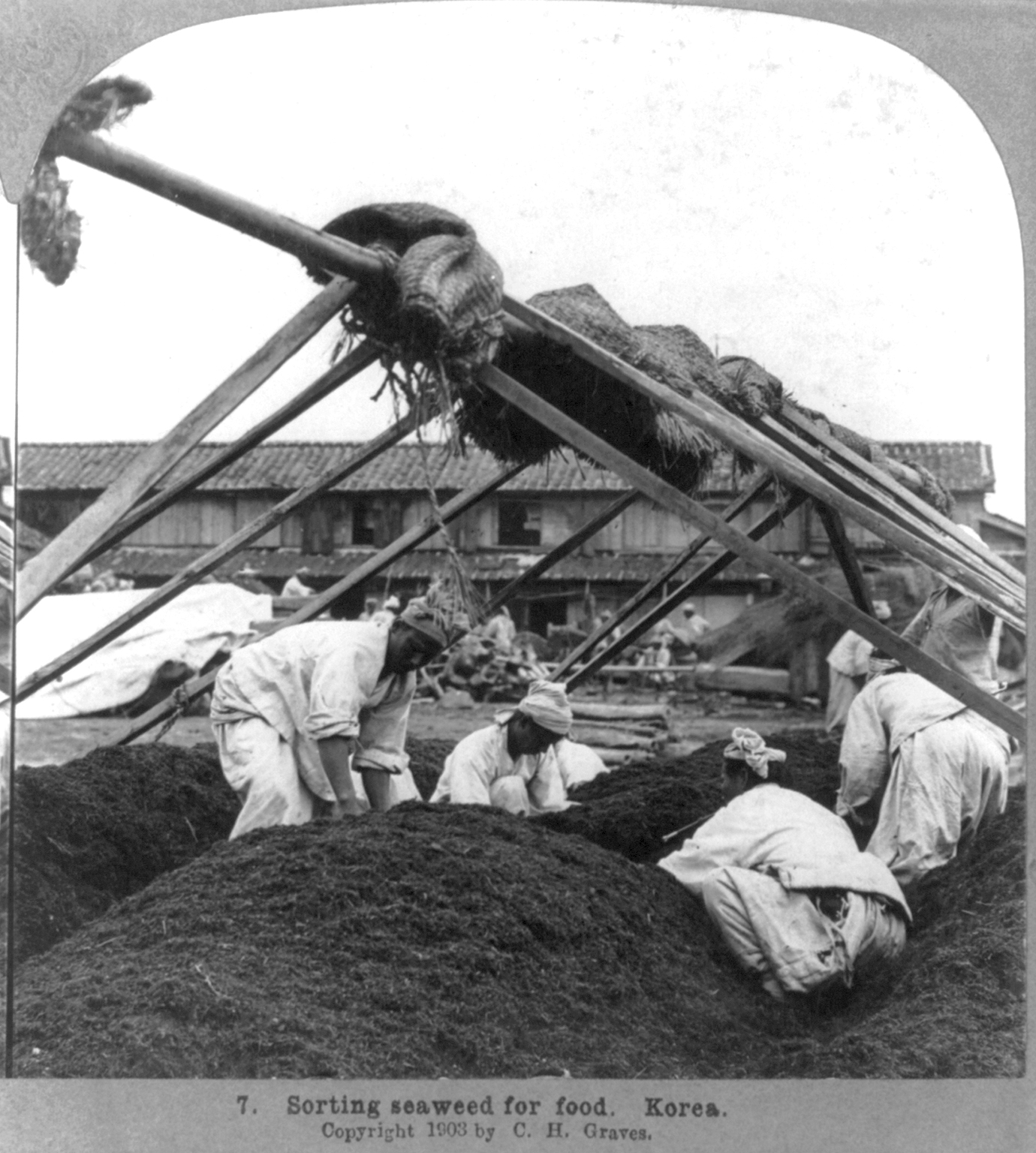
Sorting edible seaweed in Korea, 1903

Production of gim in Jeolla and Gyeongsang Provinces is reported in books from 15–16th century, including Sinjeung Dongguk Yeoji Seungnam|Revised and Augmented Survey of the Geography of Korea (1530) and Gyeongsang-do Jiriji | Geography of Gyeongsang Province (1425). In these books, gim is mentioned as a regional delicacy.

Gim cultivation is the oldest aquaculture in Korea and there are several stories from oral tradition about its origins. One version tells the story of an old lady in Hadong, South Gyeongsang Province who discovered a log covered in gim floating down the Seomjin River. This inspired her to cultivate the gim on upright support poles made of bamboo. Another legend says gim was named after Gim Yeoik (1606–1660)―the first person to have cultivated gim after seeing a drifting oak branch covered in it. Yeoik's story takes place on Taein Island which is located in the mouth of Seomjin River in Gwangyang, South Jeolla Province, during the reign of King Injo (1623–1649). Gim cultivation continued to expand and spread throughout the southern coastlands of Korean Empire (1897‒1910).

Early cultivation methods using bamboo or oak sticks were eventually replaced by newer methods that utilized nets, developed in the 19th century by a fish harvester who was inspired by gim that grew naturally on fish fences installed in the tidal waters of Wando, South Jeolla Province. Floating rafts have been used for mass production since the 1920s.

== Production ==
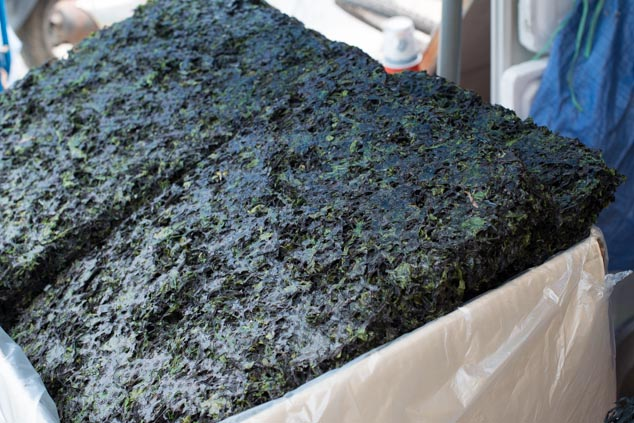
Gim sheets

The modern method of producing edible seaweed sheets was introduced from Japan. The sheet form was invented in Asakusa, Edo (contemporary Tokyo), around 1750 in the Edo period influenced by the method of Japanese paper-making. The Asakusanori method of production gave rise to the itanori method that is currently used today in Japan and Korea, among other countries.

Around 19,500 tonnes of dried gim are produced annually in South Korea. Since naturally grown gim is insufficient to meet market demand, most of the gim produced for commercial markets is cultivated. Pyropia is a widely cultivated species.

Many naturally growing Porphyra species, often clinging to rocks, are collected by hand: P. suborbiculata can be found along the coasts of the Sea of Japan, the Yellow Sea, and the South Sea; P. pseudolinearis is found along the coasts of the Sea of Japan; P. dentata along the coasts of Yellow Sea; and P. seriata grows in the South Sea area.

=== Cultivation ===
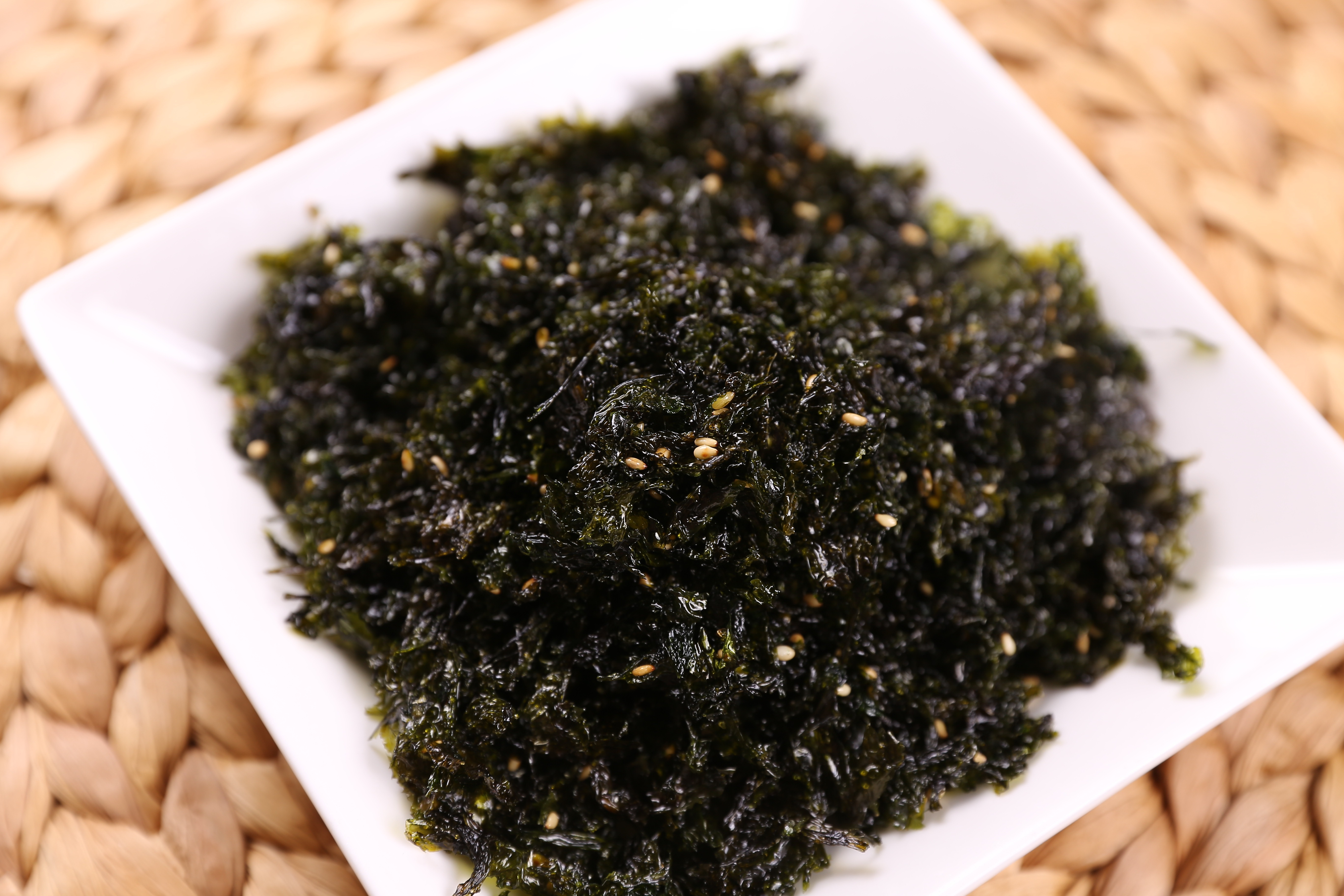
Gim flakes

P. yezoensis is the most commonly cultivated species of gim, followed by P. tenera. Wando, South Jeolla Province is the main production area for cultivated gim. Gim cultivation is traditional to the Southern parts Korean peninsula—the Honam, Yeongnam regions, and Jeju Island—as the algae only grow in the oceans around the southern part of Korean Peninsula. However, due to increases in sea temperature, gim can now be cultivated further north and has spread to the Hoseo region in central South Korea.

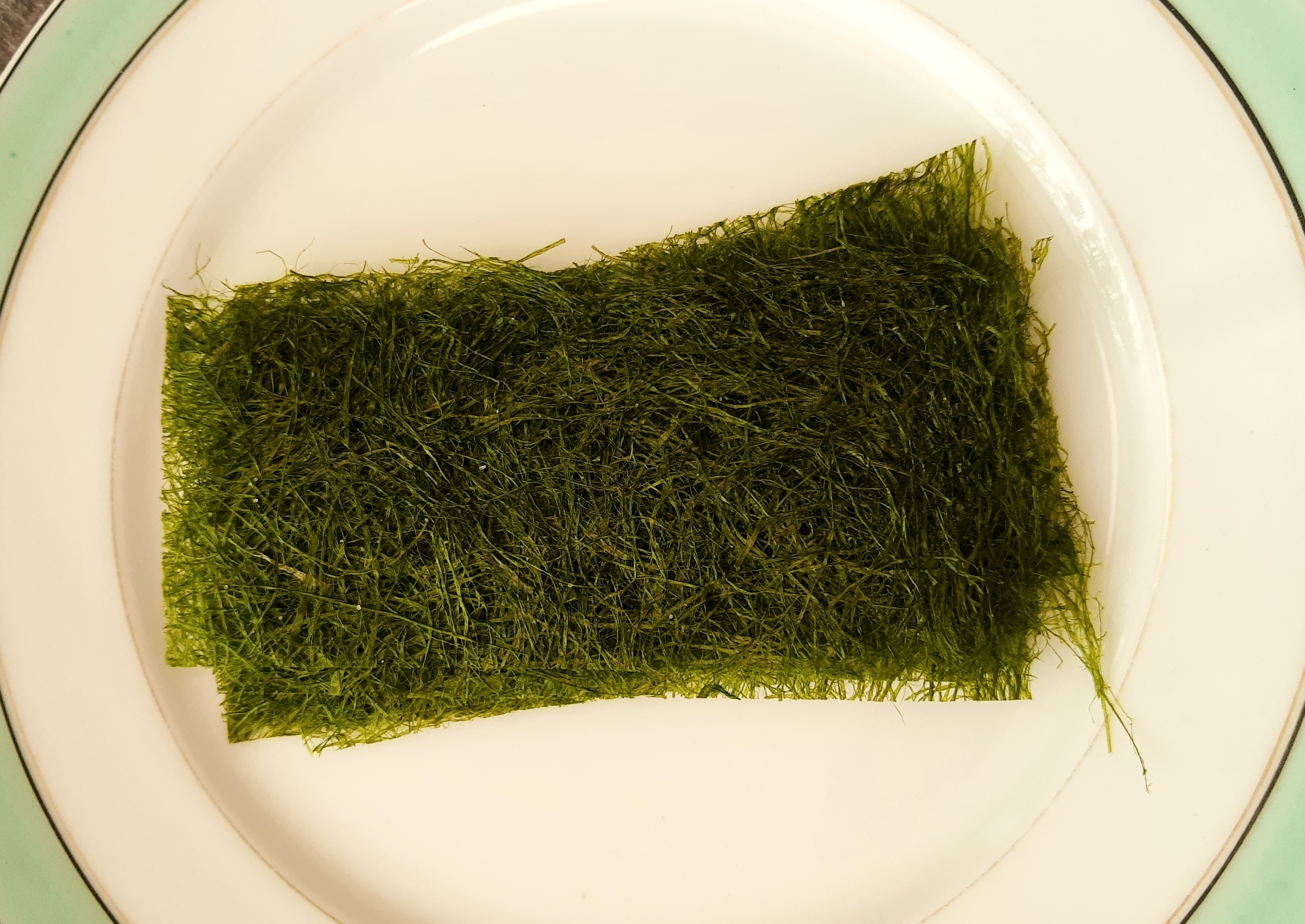
Gim made from Ulva prolifera

Gim produced during the winter in estuaries or the brackish water zone, with 1.024 ‰ salinity, is said to be the most delicious. Seeding begins in autumn—between September and October—and multiple harvests can be taken from a single seeding throughout the winter months. The algae are known to grow well in sea water when temperatures are between 5 and 8 °C (41 and 46 °F). Gim that has been grown for 50 days is considered best for consumption, as the color and flavor are at their peak.

Two main cultivation methods are used in contemporary gim farming: traditional "racks" method used for high quality gim that is similar to naturally grown laver, and the "floating rafts" method used for mass production. Racks type gim, similar in quality to naturally occurring laver, is currently produced in some areas of Wando, Sinan, Gangjin, and Jangheung; however this type of gim is grown in fewer than 100 farms across the country. The number of farms that use the rack method has been declining due to high production costs, low cultivation yields, aging fishing village populations, and increasing water temperatures caused by global warming.

==== Racks ====
Racks type cultivation starts with planting bamboo sticks in the seabed. Nets, to which the laver seeds can stick, are tied to the bamboo posts. Several nets may be connected together. Seeds are planted on the nets in September, often helped by the process of installing nets in multiple layers to facilitate the clinging of the seeds to the net; the layers of nets are separated and re-installed once the seeds are well attached. The nets are subsequently moved to a farming area. The rack type nets installed at gim farms are submerged during high tide and exposed to the sun at low tide; this limited exposure to the sun allows for a certain amount of photosynthesis that helps maintain the original flavor of the gim. Farming gim using the rack technique is an eco-friendly cultivation method.

==== Floating rafts ====
Gim cultivation with floating rafts is the most suitable for mass-production because it is less labor-intensive than rack cultivation. This method keeps the laver submerged in the water during both the high and low tides.

== Nutrition ==
Gim is known to be abundant in protein, thiamine, riboflavin, and vitamins A, B_{6}, and B_{12}. It is also known to have a high content of dietary minerals, particularly iodine and iron, and essential amino acids.

== Culinary uses ==
When eaten as a banchan (side dish), dried sheets of gim are toasted with sesame oil or perilla oil, sprinkled with fine salt and cut into squares. It may also be deep-fried to make coated fritters called bugak. For use in gimbap, the sheets are not salted, but are instead only toasted.

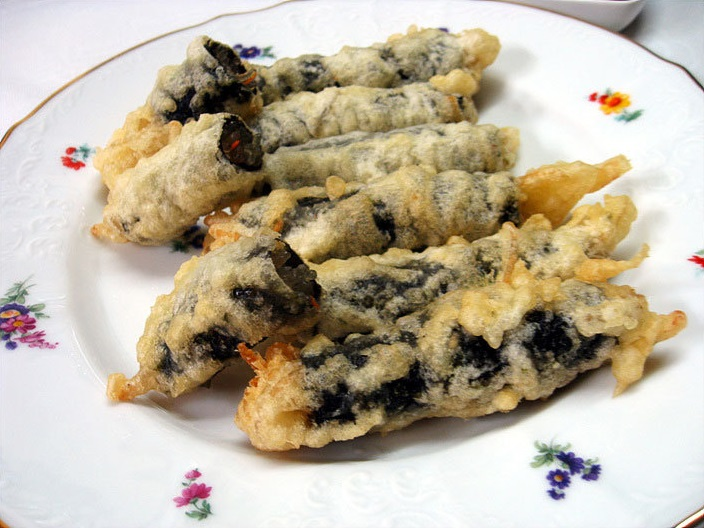
Fried gim twigim

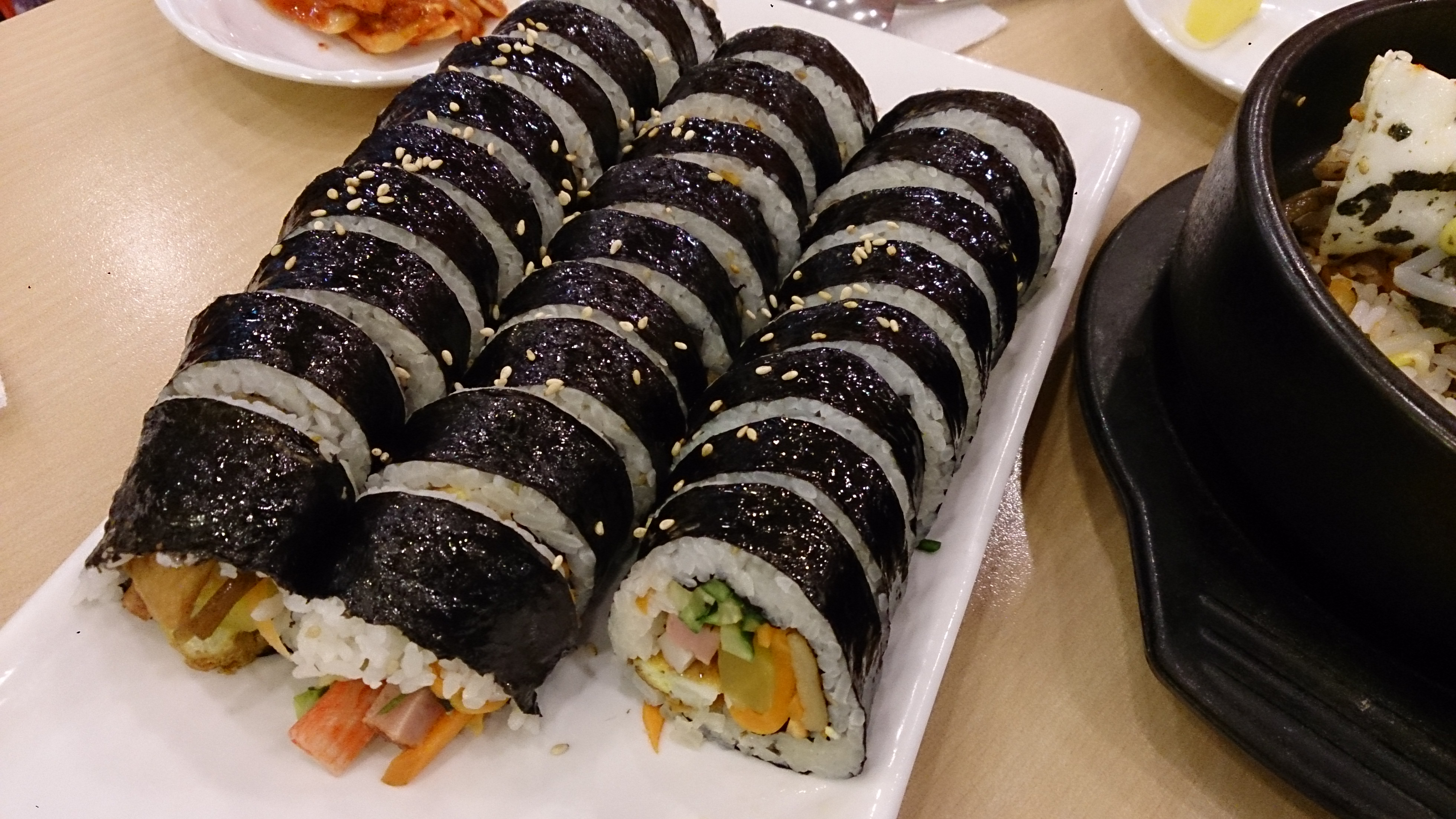
Gimbap

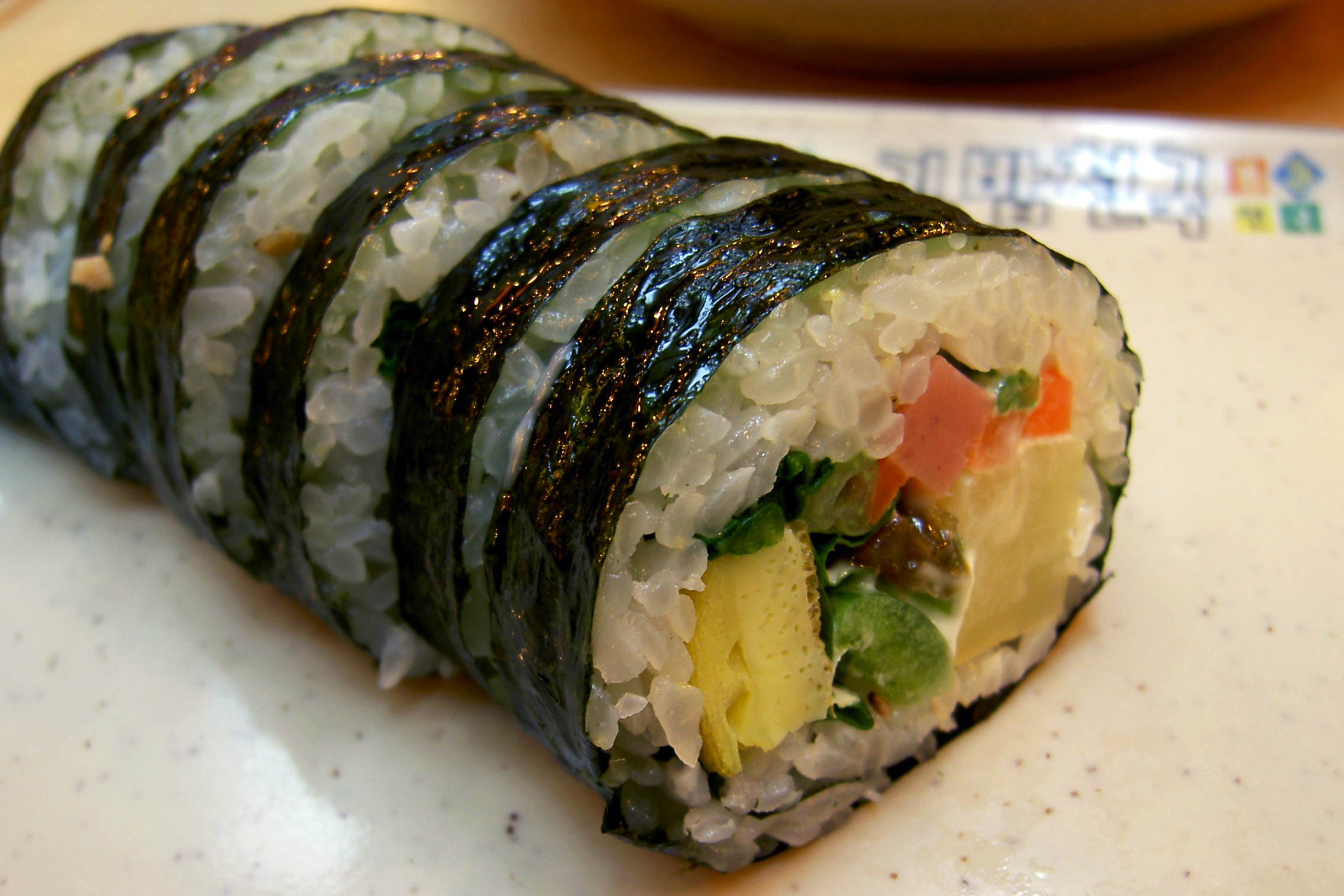

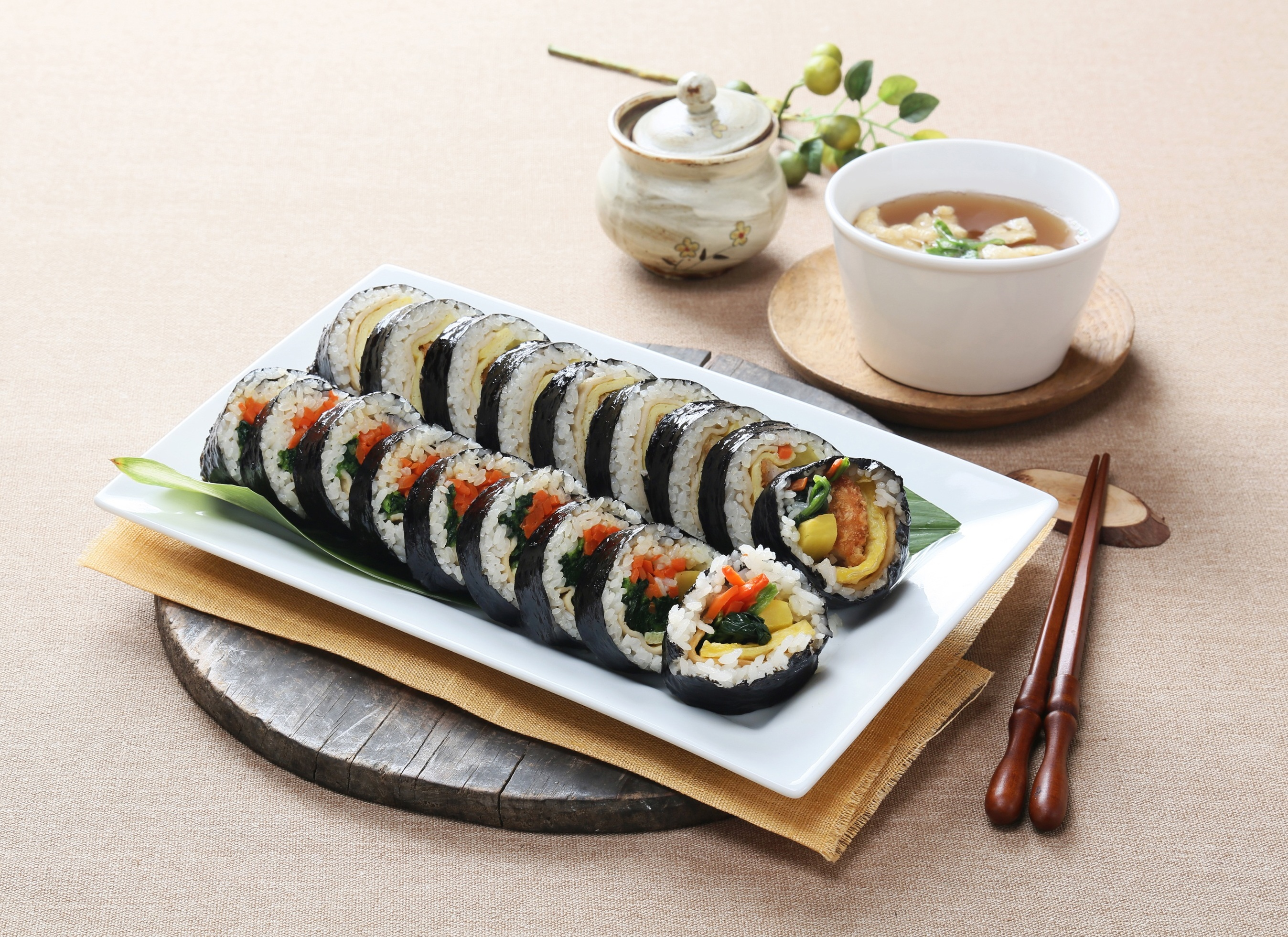

== Similar food ==
The red algae genus is also consumed in Japanese cuisine as nori (海苔), in Chinese cuisine as haitai (海苔) or zicai (紫菜), and in Wales and Ireland as laverbread.

== See also ==
- Wakame
- Green laver
- Laverbread
- Seaweed farming
