= Hans Christian Lyngbye =

Danish priest and botanist (1782–1837)

Hans Christian Lyngbye (29 June 1782 – 18 May 1837) was a Danish priest and botanist, specialising in algae.

== Life ==
Hans Christian Lyngbye was born in Aalborg, Denmark, in 1782, the son of a teacher, Jens Michelsen Lyngbye. He attended the Latin school in Aalborg until 1802 when he took as his tutor a priest on the island of Vendsyssel. He studied botany and theology and graduated in 1812. He then worked with the botanist Niels Hofman Bang which awoke his interest in algae. He won a competition set by the University of Copenhagen and as a result, Hornemann paid for the printing of his work on algae, Tentamen Hydrophytologiæ Danica, which was published in 1819. It contained meticulous descriptions of 321 species of marine algae with illustrations of 70, including 7 new genera and 50 new species, and raised awareness of the algal flora of Denmark, Norway, the Faroe Islands and Greenland.

He visited the Faroe Islands in 1817 and wrote a treatise on pilot whales and whaling. He was also fascinated by the old Faroese fables and ballads and made a collection of them, going so far as to learn the old Faroese language in order to be able to write them down. One of these was Loka Táttur, a rare depiction of Norse gods in folklore.

From 1819, he worked as a priest, first at Gjesing and Nørager and later on the coast at Søborg and Gilleleje. Here he was able to pursue his studies of seaweed.

In 1836, he wrote a dissertation for a doctorate degree, but it remained forgotten in the pocket of the cloak worn by the messenger conveying it to the University of Copenhagen and it missed the deadline. He died the following year. The botanical part of the thesis was published in 1879.

The genus of blue-green algae, Lyngbya, was named in his honour.
