= Jacob Georg Agardh =

Swedish botanist, phycologist, and taxonomist (1813–1901)

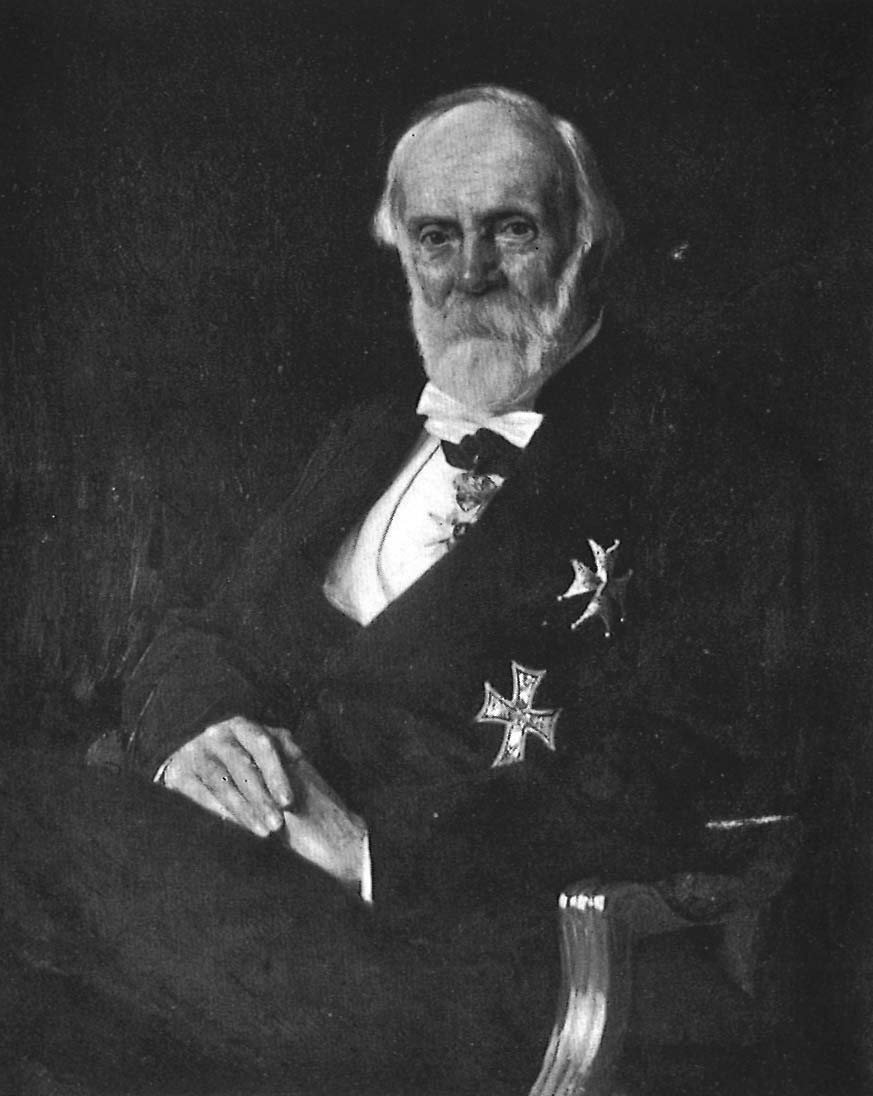
- Jacob Georg Agardh (1813–1901) painted by Oscar Björck in 1893
- Born: 8 December 1813; Lund, Sweden
- Died: 17 January 1901 (aged 87); Lund, Sweden
- Known for: Species, Genera et Ordines Algarum (1843–1863)
- Scientific career
- Fields: Botany
- Author abbrev. (botany): J.Agardh

Jacob Georg Agardh (8 December 1813 in Lund, Sweden – 17 January 1901 in Lund, Sweden) was a Swedish botanist, phycologist, and taxonomist.

== Early life and career ==
He was the son of Carl Adolph Agardh, and from 1854 until 1879 was professor of botany at Lund University. Agardh designed the current 1862 blueprints for the botanical garden Botaniska trädgården in Lund.

In 1849, he was elected a member of the Royal Swedish Academy of Sciences. Agardh was elected a Foreign Honorary Member of the American Academy of Arts and Sciences in 1878. It is said that the naturalist Mary Philadelphia Merrifield learnt Swedish in order that she could correspond with him.

== Australian female collectors and Mueller ==
Ferdinand von Mueller, as the Government Botanist of Victoria from 1853 to 1896, played an important role in facilitating the study of Australian flora, including algae. Mueller established an extensive network of collectors across Australia, many of whom were women. He actively encouraged these female collectors to gather specimens, which he then sent to specialists around the world for identification and description. In the case of algae, Mueller regularly corresponded with Agardh in Sweden, who was a leading expert in phycology. Mueller would send Agardh specimens collected by his network of female botanists, along with any relevant information about the specimens. Agardh would then identify and sometimes describe new species based on these specimens.

Agardh received specimens and assistance from several female botanical collectors in Australia during his work on Australian algae. These included Louisa Atkinson, who collected specimens at Berrima and the Blue Mountains in New South Wales in the 1860s–1870s; Miss Goodwin, who collected algae specimens at George Town, Tasmania in the late 1860s; Jessie Hussey, who collected extensively in South Australia in the 1890s and corresponded directly with Agardh after Mueller's death; Jemima Frances Irvine, who collected algae specimens in Western Australia in the late 1880s; and Mary Lodder, who collected algae in Tasmania in the late 1880s. Agardh named several algal species after these collectors, including Dasya feredayae and Nemastoma feredayae after Susan Fereday, Kallymenia nitophylloides after Nina Hodgkinson, and Lenormandia hypoglossum and Curdiea irvineae after Jemima Irvine. Ferdinand von Mueller often acted as an intermediary, forwarding specimens from these collectors to Agardh in Sweden for identification and description.

== Works and Botanical Collecting ==
His principal work, Species, Genera et Ordines Algarum (4 vols., Lund, 1848–63), was a standard authority. Specimens collected by Agardh are cared for by the National Herbarium of Victoria (MEL), Royal Botanic Gardens Victoria
