= Wendy Nelson (marine scientist) =

New Zealand botanist and phycologist

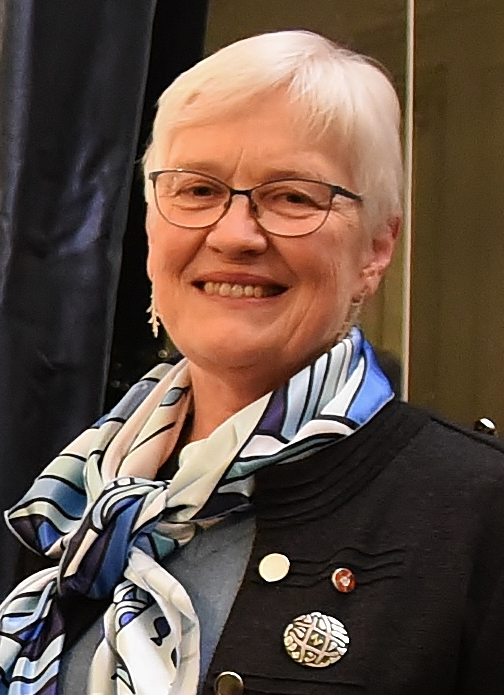
- Nelson in 2018
- Education: University of British Columbia
- Awards: Hutton Medal
- Scientific career
- Fields: Marine biology
- Thesis: Analipus japonicus (Harv.) Wynne (Phaeophyta): studies of its biology and taxonomy (1980)

Wendy Alison Nelson MNZM is a New Zealand marine scientist and world expert in phycology. She is New Zealand's leading authority on seaweeds. Nelson is particularly interested in the biosystematics of seaweeds/macroalgae of New Zealand, with research on floristics, evolution and phylogeny, as well as ecology, and life history studies of marine algae. Recently she has worked on the systematics and biology of red algae including coralline algae, distribution and diversity of seaweeds in harbours and soft sediment habitats, and seaweeds of the Ross Sea and Balleny Islands.

== Education ==
Nelson was born in Dunedin. As a child she describes herself as obsessed with rock pools, beginning snorkeling at age 12, and was strongly influenced by Morton and Miller's 1968 book The New Zealand Seashore. She completed a BSc at the University of Auckland in 1975, then a BSc Hons at Victoria University of Wellington, before heading to Vancouver, Canada, to do her PhD at the University of British Columbia.

== Professional life ==
Nelson started working at New Zealand's National Museum in the 1970s, where she studied with her mentor Nancy Adams. She was appointed Curator of Botany at the National Museum when Nancy Adams retired in 1987. From 1987 to 2002, she documented the national museum's seaweed collections, and added almost 8,000 new specimens. She moved to the National Institute of Water and Atmospheric Research (NIWA) in 2002, where she is principal scientist and programme leader in marine biology, and is currently a Professor of Biological Sciences at the University of Auckland.

Nelson is involved in a number of different projects cataloguing and describing marine algae from around New Zealand. She is also involved in the CARIM (Coastal acidification – rate, impacts and management) research project funded by the Ministry of Business Innovation and Employment. The project is generating new knowledge on ocean acidification, to enhance protection and management of New Zealand coastal ecosystems. In 2019 she was principal author of a Department of Conservation report on the conservation status of New Zealand macroalgae, which classified 609 of 938 species as data deficient and two as critically endangered. She has published over 185 peer-reviewed papers and four books, one as editor.

Nelson was a member of the New Zealand Conservation Authority for eight years. She was re-appointed on 7 August 2020 for a further three-year term. In 2015 she led the Royal Society of New Zealand report on the "National Taxonomic Collections of New Zealand." She was for two years the president of the International Phycological Society.

== Honours and awards ==
In 1996, Nelson was named winner of the Zonta Science Award. The prize included an 'around the world airline ticket' to visit herbariums in Europe.

In the 2008 Queen's Birthday Honours, Nelson was appointed a Member of the New Zealand Order of Merit, for services to the marine environment.

In 2016, Nelson won the Royal Society of New Zealand's Hutton Medal, which is awarded for outstanding work by a researcher in New Zealand in the Earth, plant and animal sciences. The Royal Society commented: "She has significantly expanded knowledge of New Zealand seaweeds and the evolutionary relationships between seaweeds worldwide. She has also campaigned against seaweed pests and advanced understanding of the ecological importance of coral seaweeds and their vulnerability to climate change."

In 2017, Nelson was selected as one of the Royal Society Te Apārangi's "150 women in 150 words", celebrating the contributions of women to knowledge in New Zealand.

In 2020 Nelson was awarded the Nancy Burbidge Medal by the Australasian Systematic Botany Society, the society's highest honour. Her Nancy T Burbidge lecture, titled "New perspectives on species recognition and the distribution of non-indigenous marine macroalgae in New Zealand", was given on 13 July 2021 (the 2020 conference was postonied due to the COVID-19 pandemic.

== Eponymy ==
Nelson has named and described 70 taxa, and has had a species and a genus named after her:

- Skeletonella nelsoniae Millar and De Clerck, 2007
- Wendya D'Archino and Lin, 2016

== Selected works ==
- Nelson, W. A. (2013, revised ed. 2020). New Zealand Seaweeds: an illustrated guide. Wellington, N.Z.: Te Papa Press.
- Nelson, W. A. (2012). "Phylum Rhodophyta: Red algae." In D. P. Gordon (Ed.) New Zealand inventory of biodiversity. Volume three. Kingdoms Bacteria, Protozoa, Chromista, Plantae, Fungi (pp. 327–346). Christchurch, NZ: Canterbury University Press.
- Nelson, W. A., Bilewitch, J. P., & Sutherland, J. E. (2018). "Distribution of the genus Zonaria (Dictyotales: Phaeophyceae) in New Zealand, and description of Zonaria cryptica sp. nov from Stewart Island." New Zealand Journal of Botany 1–12. 10.1080/0028825X.2018.1478310
- Nelson, W. A., & Sutherland, J. E. (2018). "Prasionema heeschiae sp. nov. (Prasiolales, Chlorophyta) from Campbell Island, New Zealand: first record of Prasionema in the southern hemisphere." European Journal of Phycology, 53 (2), 198–207. 10.1080/09670262.2018.1423577
- Nelson, W., & Sutherland, J. (2017). "Predaea rosa sp. nov. (Nemastomatales, Rhodophyta): A cool-temperate species from southern New Zealand." Phycologia, 56 (2), 167–175. 10.2216/16-81.1
- Nelson, W. A., & Dalen, J. (2016). "New Zealand Rhodymeniales: A New Name for Gloioderma saccatum (J. Agardh) Kylin." Cryptogamie, Algologie, 37 (3), 171–178. 10.7872/crya/v37.iss3.2016.171
