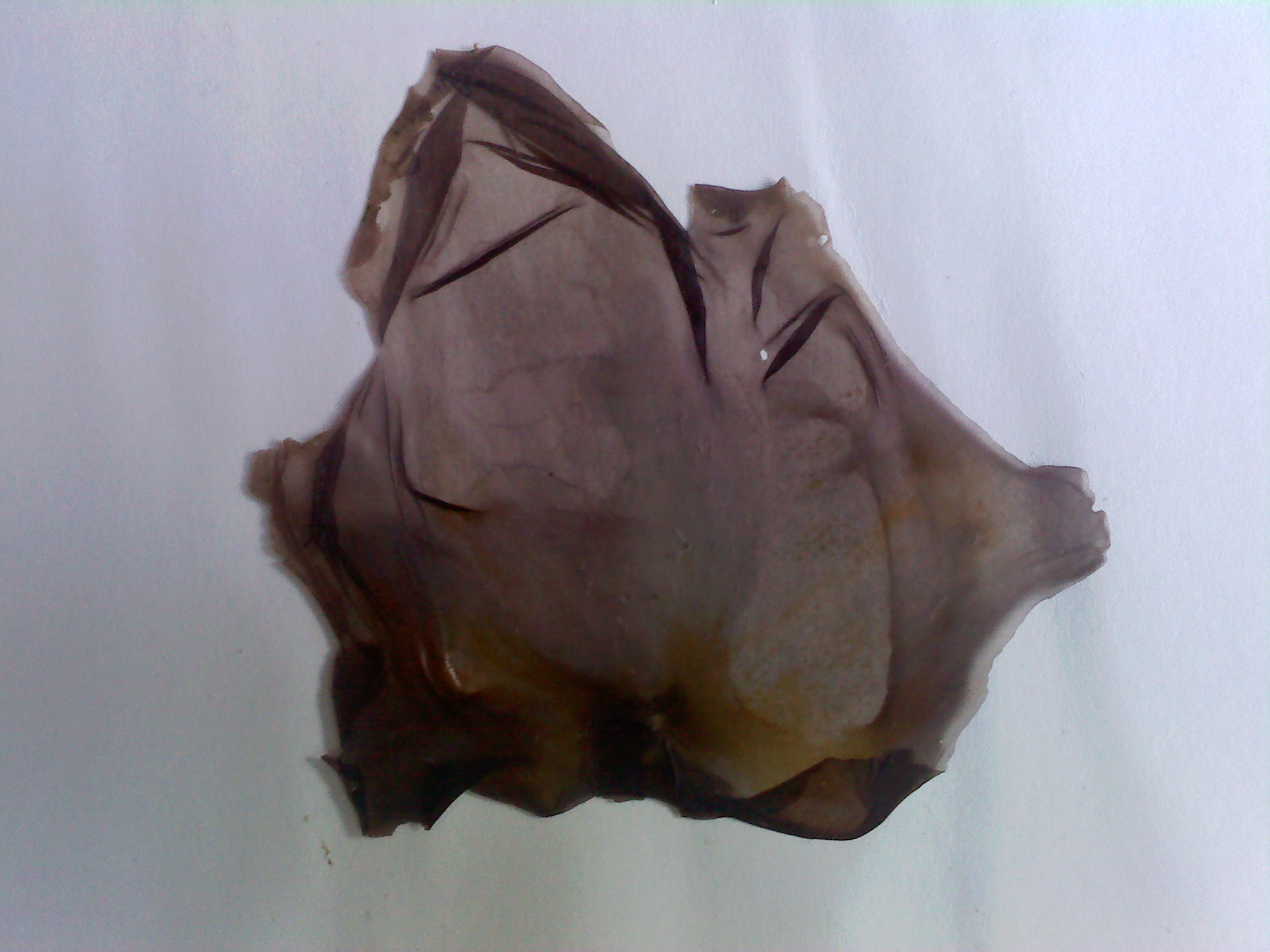
- Porphyra umbilicalis

Scientific classification
- Clade: Archaeplastida
- Division: Rhodophyta
- Subdivision: Eurhodophytina
- Class: Bangiophyceae; Wettstein, 1901

Orders
- Bangiales; Goniotrichales (disputed) (Note: According to World Register of Marine Species, the only genus Goniotrichales contains, Goniotrichum, is currently unaccepted and instead merged into Erythrotrichia. However, the U.S. Fish and Wildlife Service continues to classify it as a valid taxon.)

= Bangiophyceae =

Bangiophyceae Temporal range: ~1047–0 Ma

Class of algae

Bangiophyceae is a class of red algae that includes the order Bangiales and possibly Goniotrichales. In some classifications it is merged with the Florideophyceae to form the Rhodophyceae. The Bangiophyceae, as defined traditionally, are paraphyletic. Their taxonomic identification has been difficult because of a lack of distinct morphological features, and the presumed morphological plasticity of the species. Molecular tools are required to elucidate the relationships within this assemblage.

It is still used by some sources, and defined sensu stricto (including Bangia and Porphyra but not the species included in Florideophyceae) is considered a valid clade.
