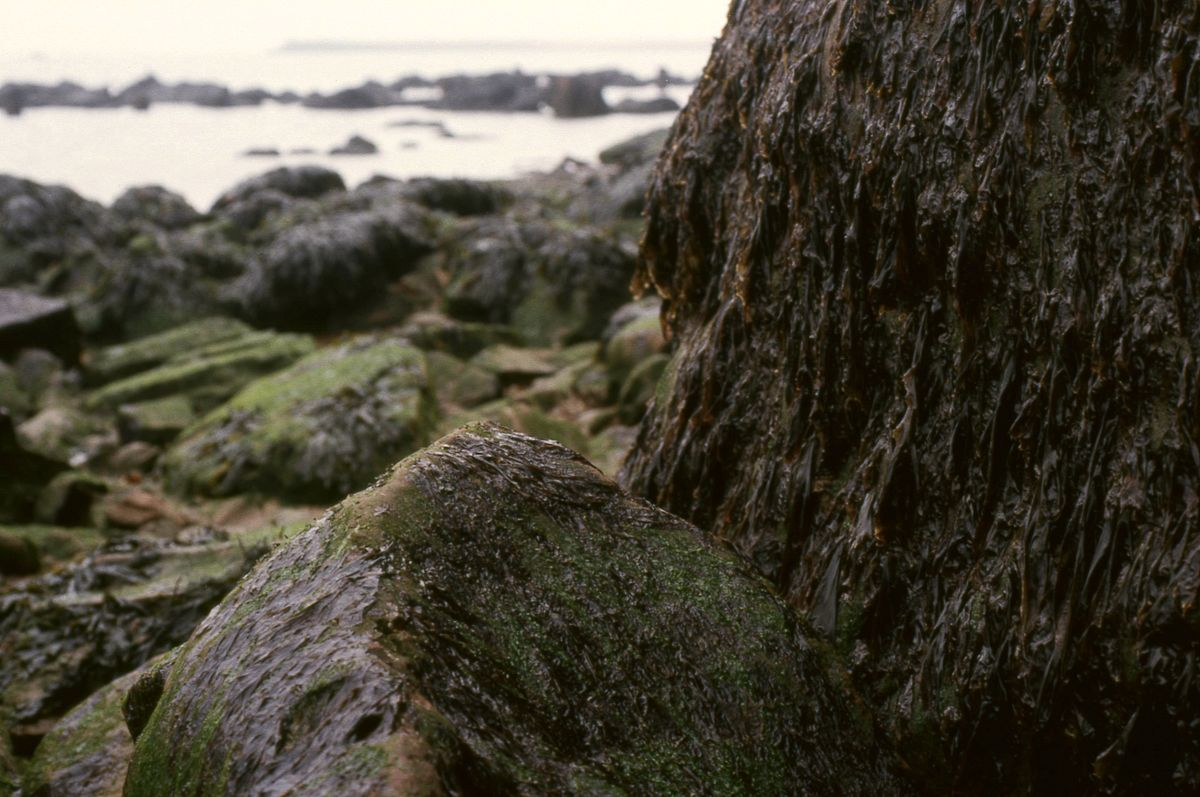
- Porphyra umbilicalis (right) and Porphyra purpurea (front), in Heligoland

Scientific classification
- Domain: Eukaryota
- Supergroup: Archaeplastida
- Division: Rhodophyta
- Class: Bangiophyceae
- Order: Bangiales
- Family: Bangiaceae
- Genus: Porphyra; C.Agardh 1824

Species
- see text

Synonyms
- Conchocelis Batters 1892; Phyllona J.Hill 1773

= Porphyra =

Genus of seaweed

Porphyra is a genus of coldwater seaweeds that grow in cold, shallow seawater. More specifically, it belongs to red algae phylum of laver species (from which comes laverbread), comprising approximately 70 species. It grows in the intertidal zone, typically between the upper intertidal zone and the splash zone in cold waters of temperate oceans. In East Asia, it is used to produce the sea vegetable products nori (in Japan) and gim (in Korea). There are considered to be 60–70 species of Porphyra worldwide and seven around Britain and Ireland, where it has been traditionally used to produce edible sea vegetables on the Irish Sea coast. The species Porphyra purpurea has one of the largest plastid genomes known, with 251 genes.

== Life cycle ==
Porphyra displays a heteromorphic alternation of generations. The thallus we see is the haploid generation; it can reproduce asexually by forming spores which grow to replicate the original thallus. It can also reproduce sexually. Both male and female gametes are formed on the one thallus. The female gametes while still on the thallus are fertilized by the released male gametes, which are non-motile. The fertilized, now diploid, carposporangia after mitosis produce spores (carpospores) which settle, then bore into shells, germinate and form a filamentous stage. This stage was originally thought to be a different species of alga, and was referred to as Conchocelis rosea. That Conchocelis was the diploid stage of Porphyra was discovered in 1949 by the British phycologist Kathleen Mary Drew-Baker for the European species Porphyra umbilicalis. It was later shown for species from other regions as well.

== Food ==
Most human cultures with access to Porphyra use it as a food or somehow in the diet, making it perhaps the most domesticated of the marine algae, known as laver, rong biển (Vietnamese), nori (Japanese:海苔), amanori (Japanese), zakai, gim (Korean:김), zǐcài (Chinese:紫菜), karengo, sloke or slukos. The marine red alga Porphyra has been cultivated extensively in many Asian countries as an edible seaweed used to wrap the rice and fish that compose the Japanese food sushi and the Korean food gimbap. In Japan, the annual production of Porphyra species is valued at 100 billion yen (US$1 billion).

P. umbilicalis is harvested from the coasts of Great Britain and Ireland, where it has a variety of culinary uses, including laverbread. In Hawaii, "the species P. atropurpurea is considered a delicacy, called Limu luau". Porphyra is also harvested by the Southern Kwakiutl, Haida, Seechelt, Squawmish, Nuu-chah-nulth, Nuxalk, Tsimshian, and Tlingit peoples of the North American Pacific coast.

=== Vitamin B12 ===
Porphyra contains vitamin B12 and one study suggests that it is the most suitable non-meat source of this essential vitamin. In the view of the Academy of Nutrition and Dietetics, however, it may not provide an adequate source of B12 for vegans.

== Species ==
Porphyra currently contains 57 confirmed species and 14 unconfirmed species.

=== Confirmed ===
- Porphyra abbottae V.Krishnamurthy, 1972 (often treated as Pyropia abbottiae)
- Porphyra akasakae A.Miura, 1977
- Porphyra angusta Okamura & Ueda, 1932
- Porphyra argentinensis M.L.Piriz, 1981
- Porphyra atropurpurea (Olivi) De Toni, 1897
- Porphyra augustinae Kützing, 1843
- Porphyra autumnalis Zanardini, 1860
- Porphyra bulbopes (Yendo) Ueda, 1932
- Porphyra capensis Kützing, 1843
- Porphyra ceylanica J.Agardh, 1883
- Porphyra chauhanii C.Anil Kumar & M.V.N.Panikkar, 1995
- Porphyra coccinea J.Agardh
- Porphyra corallicola H.Kucera & G.W. Saunders, 2012
- Porphyra delicatula Welwitsch
- Porphyra dentimarginata Chu Chia-yen & Wang Su-chuan, 1960
- Porphyra dioica J.Brodie & L.M.Irvine, 1997
- Porphyra fujianensis Zhang & Wang, 1993
- Porphyra grateloupicola P.L.Crouan & H.M.Crouan, 1878
- Porphyra guangdongensis C.K.Tseng & T.J.Chang, 1978
- Porphyra inaequicrassa Perestenko, 1980
- Porphyra indica V.Krishnamurthy & M.Baluswami, 1984
- Porphyra ionae R.W.Ricker, 1987
- Porphyra irregularis E.Fukuhara, 1968
- Porphyra kanyakumariensis V.Krishnamurthy & M.Baluswami, 1984
- Porphyra ledermannii Pilger, 1911
- Porphyra linearis Greville, 1830
- Porphyra longissima A.Meynard, M.E.Ramírez & L.Contreras-Porcia, 2018
- Porphyra lucasii Levring, 1953
- Porphyra luchea A.Meynard, M.E.Ramírez & L.Contreras-Porcia, 2018
- Porphyra malvanensis Anilkumar & P.S.N.Rao, 2005
- Porphyra marcosii P.A.Cordero, 1976
- Porphyra marginata C.K.Tseng & T.J.Chang, 1958
- Porphyra microphylla Zanardini, 1860
- Porphyra monosporangia S.Wang & J.Zhang, 1980
- Porphyra mumfordii S.C.Lindstrom & K.M.Cole, 1992
- Porphyra njordii P.M.Pedersen, 2011
- Porphyra ochotensis Nagai, 1941
- Porphyra okamurae Ueda, 1932
- Porphyra okhaensis H.V.Joshi, R.M.Oza & A.Tewari, 1992
- Porphyra oligospermatangia C.K.Tseng & B.F.Zheng, 1981
- Porphyra plocamiestris R.W.Ricker, 1987
- Porphyra pujalsiae Coll & E.C.Oliveira, 1976
- Porphyra punctata Y.Yamada & H.Mikami, 1956
- Porphyra purpurea (Roth) C.Agardh, 1824
- Porphyra qingdaoensi C.K.Tseng & B.F.Zheng, 1988
- Porphyra ramosissima Pan & Wang, 1982
- Porphyra rizzinii Coll & E.C.Oliveira, 1976
- Porphyra roseana M.Howe, 1928
- Porphyra schistothallus B.F.Zheng & J.Li
- Porphyra segregata (Setchell & Hus) V.Krishnamurthy, 1972
- Porphyra subtumens J.Agardh
- Porphyra tanakae Pham Hoang-Ho, 1985
- Porphyra tenuis B.F.Zheng & J.Li
- Porphyra tristanensis Baardseth, 1941
- Porphyra umbilicalis Kützing, 1843
- Porphyra violacea J.Agardh, 1899
- Porphyra vulgaris Kützing, 1843
- Porphyra woolhouseae Harvey, 1863

=== Unconfirmed ===
- Porphyra carnea Grunow, 1889
- Porphyra cordata Meneghini, 1844
- Porphyra cucullata De Notaris, 1865
- Porphyra grayana Reinsch, 1875
- Porphyra hospitans Zanardini, 1855
- Porphyra livida De Notaris, 1846
- Porphyra microphylla Reinsch, 1878
- Porphyra minor Zanardini, 1847
- Porphyra nobilis De Notaris, 1846 or J.Agardh, 1883
- Porphyra reniformis Meneghini, 1849
- Porphyra sericea (Wulfen) J.Agardh, 1883
- Porphyra subtumens J.Agardh ex R.M.Laing, 1928
- Porphyra tenuissima C.Agardh ex Frauenfeld, 1855

Following a major reassessment of the genus in 2011, many species previously included in Porphyra have been transferred to Pyropia: for example Pyropia tenera, Pyropia yezoensis, and the species from New Zealand Pyropia rakiura and Pyropia virididentata, leaving only five species out of seventy still within Porphyra itself.

== See also ==
- Green laver – Type of edible green seaweed
- Phocaeicola plebeius – Species of bacterium, able to digest porphyran
- Porphyran – Sulfated carbohydrate polymer, a polysacchide from Porphyra seaweed
