= Desmosterol =

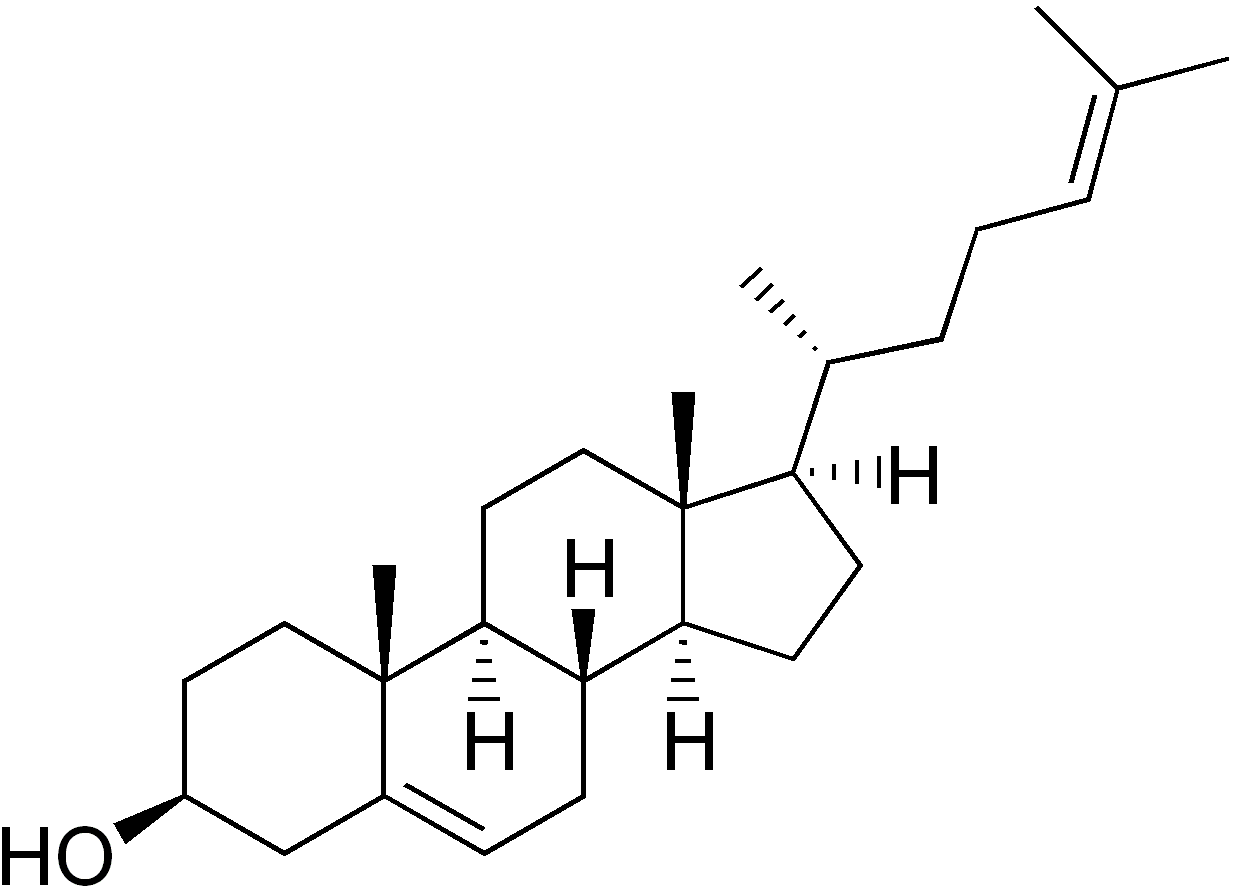

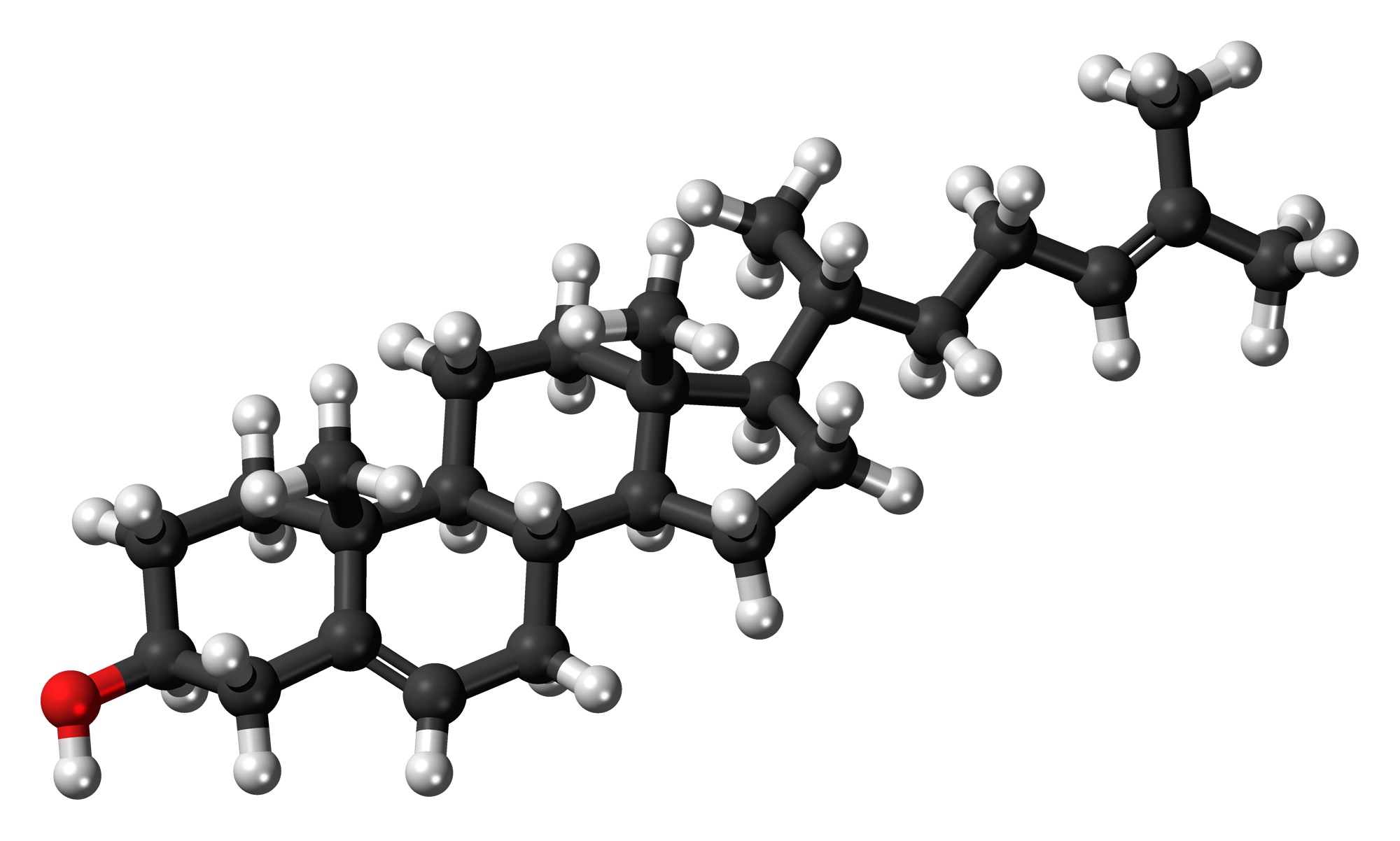

Names
- IUPAC name Cholesta-5,24-dien-3β-ol
- Systematic IUPAC name (1R,3aS,3bS,7S,9aR,9bS,11aR)-9a,11a-Dimethyl-1-[(2R)-6-methylhept-5-en-2-yl]-2,3,3a,3b,4,6,7,8,9,9a,9b,10,11,11a-tetradecahydro-1H-cyclopenta[a]phenanthren-7-ol

Identifiers
| CAS Number | 313-04-2 |
| 3D model (JSmol) | Interactive image |
| ChEBI | CHEBI:17737 |
| ChEMBL | ChEMBL455876 |
| ChemSpider | 388662 |
| ECHA InfoCard | 100.005.671 |
| IUPHAR/BPS | 2748 |
| PubChem CID | 439577 |
| UNII | ANP93865R8 |
| CompTox Dashboard (EPA) | DTXSID10878676 |
- InChI: InChI=1S/C27H44O/c1-18(2)7-6-8-19(3)23-11-12-24-22-10-9-20-17-21(28)13-15-26(20,4)25(22)14-16-27(23,24)5/h7,9,19,21-25,28H,6,8,10-17H2,1-5H3/t19-,21+,22+,23-,24+,25+,26+,27-/m1/s1 Key: AVSXSVCZWQODGV-DPAQBDIFSA-N; InChI=1/C27H44O/c1-18(2)7-6-8-19(3)23-11-12-24-22-10-9-20-17-21(28)13-15-26(20,4)25(22)14-16-27(23,24)5/h7,9,19,21-25,28H,6,8,10-17H2,1-5H3/t19-,21+,22+,23-,24+,25+,26+,27-/m1/s1 Key: AVSXSVCZWQODGV-DPAQBDIFBV
- SMILES: O[C@@H]4C/C3=C/C[C@@H]1[C@H](CC[C@]2([C@H]1CC[C@@H]2[C@H](C)CC\C=C(/C)C)C)[C@@]3(C)CC4

Properties
| Chemical formula | C_{27}H_{44}O |
| Molar mass | 384.648 g·mol^{−1} |
| Appearance | White powder |
| Melting point | 121.5 °C (250.7 °F; 394.6 K) |
- Except where otherwise noted, data are given for materials in their standard state (at 25 °C [77 °F], 100 kPa). verify (what is ?) Infobox references

Desmosterol (cholesta-5,24-dien-3β-ol) is a lipid present in the membrane of phytoplankton and an intermediate product in cholesterol synthesis in mammal cells. Structurally, desmosterol has a similar backbone to cholesterol, with the exception of an additional double bond in the structure of desmosterol.

The similarity can be seen biologically through the synthesis of cholesterol in the human body, as desmosterol is the immediate precursor to cholesterol in the Bloch pathway. Desmosterol is accumulated in desmosterolosis and undergoes reduction with the enzyme 24-dehydrocholesterol reductase to form cholesterol.

In 2014, desmosterol was named the Molecule of the Year 2012 by the International Society for Molecular and Cell Biology and Biotechnology Protocols and Researches (ISMCBBPR).

Structure of cholesterol and its immediate precursor, desmosterol.

== Background ==
Desmosterol is classified as a cholestadienol, a subgroup of a wider known group of sterols, which naturally occur in eukaryotes. The presence of desmosterol in oceans and lakes has the potential to diagnose anoxic conditions and to study trends in steroid chemistry during the early stages of diagenesis. Desmosterol has been found in high yields in samples of Rhizosolenia setigera (Brightwell) in Western Svalbard, and from surface sediment off of the Peruvian Shelf sediment-water interface.

In 1955, desmosterol was first described and isolated from chick embryo sterol with a 2% yield and was postulated as being a biological precursor to cholesterol by Stokes et al. The first known isolation of desmosterol in invertebrates was published in 1957 by Fagerlund and Idler. This new sterol was isolated in large amounts from balanus glandula, a barnacle species found on the North American Pacific coast. Additionally, small amounts of desmosterol have been found in other crustaceans such as lobster and shrimp in the homarus americanus and pandalus borealis species. This strengthens the conclusion that desmosterol must be created exogenously, as crustaceans have not been seen to biosynthesise sterols.

== Biological occurrence ==
Desmosterol has been largely found within a large population of marine invertebrates. Major sources include barnacles, red algae, annelida, and molluscs. This has led to the idea of an exogenous origin of desmosterol in phytoplankton. In 1967, desmosterol was also identified in large percentages in the red algae Laurencia pinnatifida, Polusiphonia nigrescens, Porphyra purpurea, and dulse (Rhodymenia palmata) after previously having been undetected.

In the 1968 paper by Idler, Saito and Wiseman, dulse samples were analysed and the sterols present were determined by gas liquid chromatography. Samples were collected near Grand Manan Island, New York in 1964 and 1965, and showed a significant difference in the presence of desmosterol. Samples 1 and 2 were from the same source, as were samples 3 and 4, and all samples were harvested at different times. Samples 2, 3, and 4 had the major sterol as desmosterol, compared to sample 1, with the major sterol being cholesterol. This indicates a 70% difference in desmosterol composition in the sterol samples (1 and 2) over a period of one year. There has been no conclusive evidence to show whether seasonal variation of sterols in barnacles occur.

Sterol composition of dulse samples from Grand Manan Island, New York, with data taken from Idler's 1968 paper.

== Biosynthesis ==
There are two major pathways for cholesterol biosynthesis, being the Kandutsch-Russell and Bloch pathways. The Bloch pathway, named after Konrad Bloch, occurs naturally alongside the mevalonate pathway in humans within the cell. The discovery of this pathway led Bloch, joint with Feodor Lynen, to receive a Nobel Prize in Physiology or Medicine in 1964. The award was awarded "for their discoveries concerning the mechanism and regulation of the cholesterol and fatty acid metabolism".

Synthetic pathway from desmosterol to cholesterol

== Preservation ==
Desmosterol has been seen to be present in marine sponges as a biomarker. However, bacterial symbiont sterol 24-C-methyltransferases is capable of the alkylation of desmosterol to other sponge biomarkers, 24-isopropenylcholesterol, and 24-isopropylidenecholesterol. There is insignificant data which shows that desmosterol has good preservation potential.

== Use as a Biomarker ==
As a biomarker, desmosterol is important for the Chaetoceros calcitrans and R. setigera and N. closterium diatoms as well as Rhodophyceae. However, desmosterol has the potential to be used as a taxonomic marker for diatoms where it exists as the dominant sterol, such as in Rhizosolenia.

=== Balsfjorden, Northern Norway ===
Desmosterol has been used as a biomarker for the presence of copepods. The phytoplankton bloom of P. pouchetii and Thalassiosira decipiens resulted in low amounts of desmosterol at maximum chlorophyll levels, indicating the low abundance and efficient removal of copepods in these phytoplankton.

Biomarker patterns at maximum chlorophyll in Balsfjorden. (1) 24-norcholesta-5,22E-dien-3β-ol, (2) 27-nor-24-methylcholesta-5,22E-dien-3β-ol, (3) cholesterol-5,22E-dien-3β-ol, (4) cholesterol-5-en-3β-ol, (5) 24-methylcholesta-5,22E-dien-3β-ol, (6) cholesterol-5,24-dien-3β-ol, (7) 24-methylcholesta-5,24(28)-dien-3β-ol, (8) 24-ethylcholesta-5,24(28)dien-3β-ol

=== Peruvian Shelf ===
Diatoms and Silicoflagellates are classes of phytoplankton present in sedimentary material from the sediment water interface in the Peruvian Shelf region. Mineralogical analysis of this sedimentary material suggested large volumes of phytoplankton. Researchers at the University of Bristol examined the sterol composition of these sedimentary rocks which have gone through oxygen depletion, leading to anoxic conditions. These conditions have enhanced the preservation of lipids present during the time of formation, around 1 year prior, and have limited the degradation of these compounds.

== Measurement techniques ==
Desmosterol has seen to be identified most commonly through chemical constants, ozonolysis, infrared spectroscopy, NMR, and mass spectrometry techniques. The use of thin-layer and gas-liquid chromatography to measure desmosterol is less common with the development of more advanced techniques.

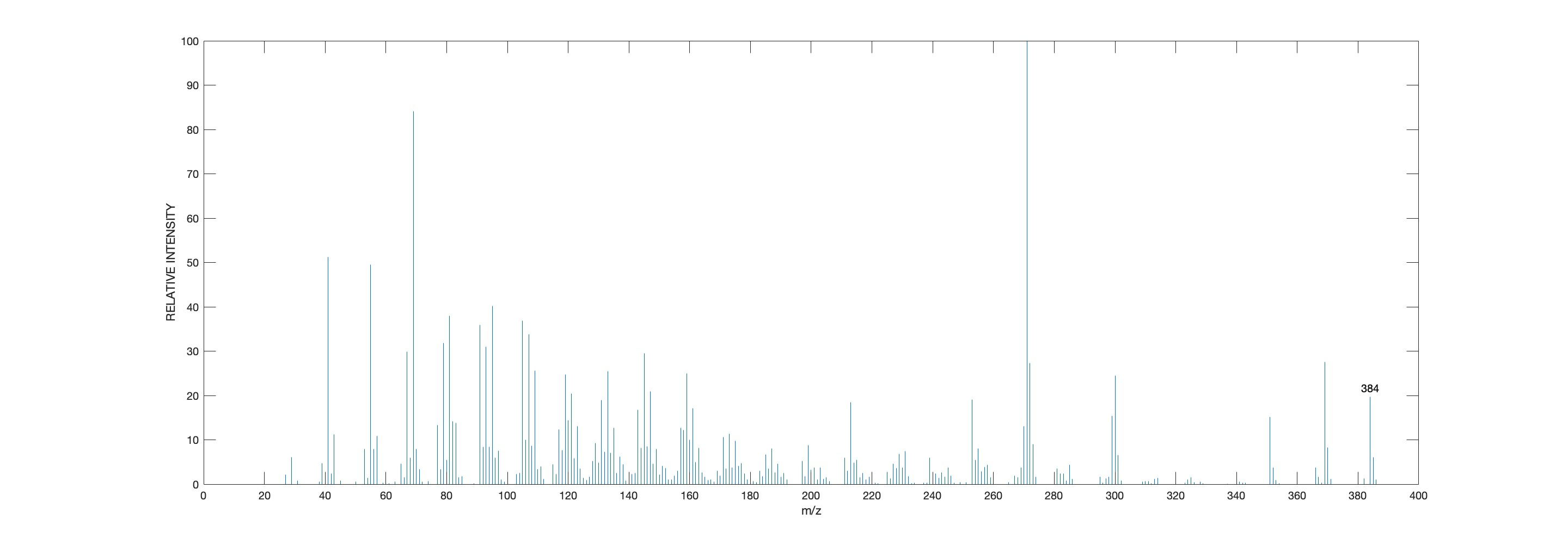
Mass Spectra of Desmosterol, with data from NIST Standard Reference Database 69: NIST Chemistry WebBook

=== GC-MS ===
Samples from water sources are first extracted and partially purified before analysis. Sterols are commonly first derivatised after purification. Lipid extracts can be separated into their fragments by ionisation using Gas Chromatography followed by Mass Spectroscopy analysis. Desmosterol has a characteristic m/z peak at 384, as seen in the mass spectra.

=== Ozonolysis ===
Desmosterol has been identified through ozonolysis of the sample, with the ozonolysis product of desmosterol having a melting point of 128 °C, and an Rf value of 0.31 with paper-chromatography with n-hexane and N,N-dimethyl formamide. The ozonolysis product also has ratios C: 45.68; H: 4.45; N: 23.21.

== See also ==
- Cholesterol
- Triparanol
