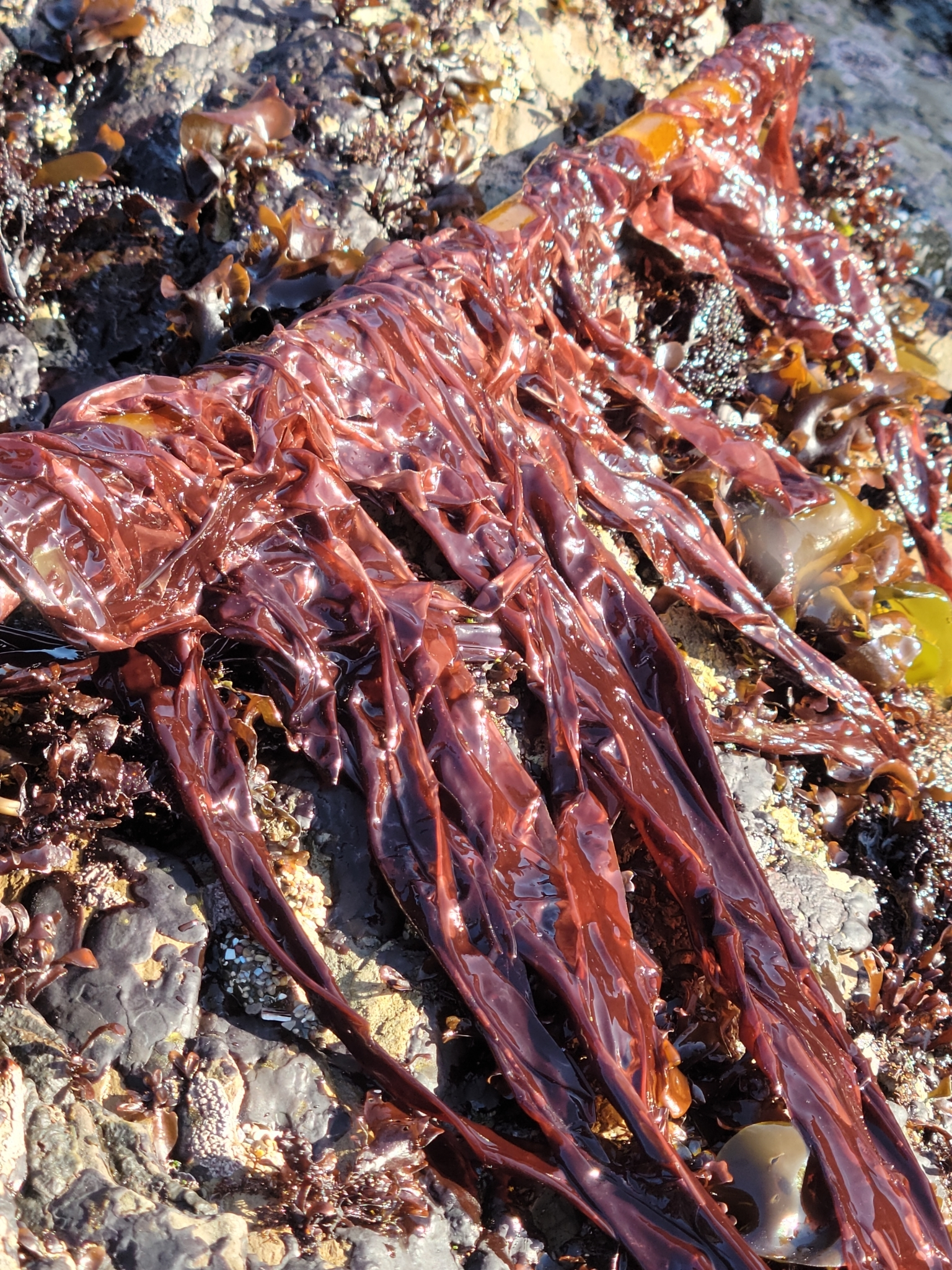
- Pyropia nereocystis

Scientific classification
- Clade: Archaeplastida
- Division: Rhodophyta
- Class: Bangiophyceae
- Order: Bangiales
- Family: Bangiaceae
- Genus: Pyropia; J.Agardh 1899

Type species
- Pyropia californica J.Agardh

Species
- See text

= Pyropia =

Genus of algae

Pyropia is a genus of red algae in the family Bangiaceae. It is found around the world in intertidal zones and shallow water. The genus has folding frond-like blades which are either red, brown or green. Some Pyropia species are used to create nori, and are thus important subjects for aquaculture.

== Taxonomy ==
Pyropia was originally erected by Jacob Georg Agardh, a botanist and professor at Lund University. Before this, and sometimes after, many species of Pyropia were placed in Porphyra, a different genus of red alga. New species of Pyropia are still being discovered, for example in 2013 research done on New Zealand plants was able to move Pyropia plicata from Porphyra.

== Description ==
Pyropia species are red algae with a discoid holdfast and short stipe. They have folded blades, which are membranous and monostromatic, coming in red, brown, and dark green colorations. These folded blades may also look like fronds until unfolded. These blades reach up to one meter in length in some species, but are generally around 20 centimeters in diameter.

== Distribution ==
Pyropia grows in intertidal zones and down to 10 meters in some bodies of water based on clarity and substrate. It grows in large swaths, attaching itself to stones and shells, covering most of the bottom. Pyropia can be found globally in warm-temperate and extratropical [cool] waters.

=== Ecology ===
Pyropia species, which reside in the upper intertidal zone, endure many stresses, including intense direct light, temperature fluctuation, osmotic stress, salinity fluctuation, and desiccation. They are especially able to handle heat stress; some Pyropia species will halt metabolic systems that are not essential to homeostasis, such as photosynthesis. Other species will use increased lipid production to fight desiccation. The ability of Pyropia species to adapt to deal with these stresses makes them heavily studied organisms.

One of the threats to Pyropia is fungal infections by Alternaria sp. ZL-1, which has been observed in farming environments on Pyropia yezoensis . The fungus kills Pyropia cells and leaves brown rust-like spots on the outside of the blades.

== Use ==
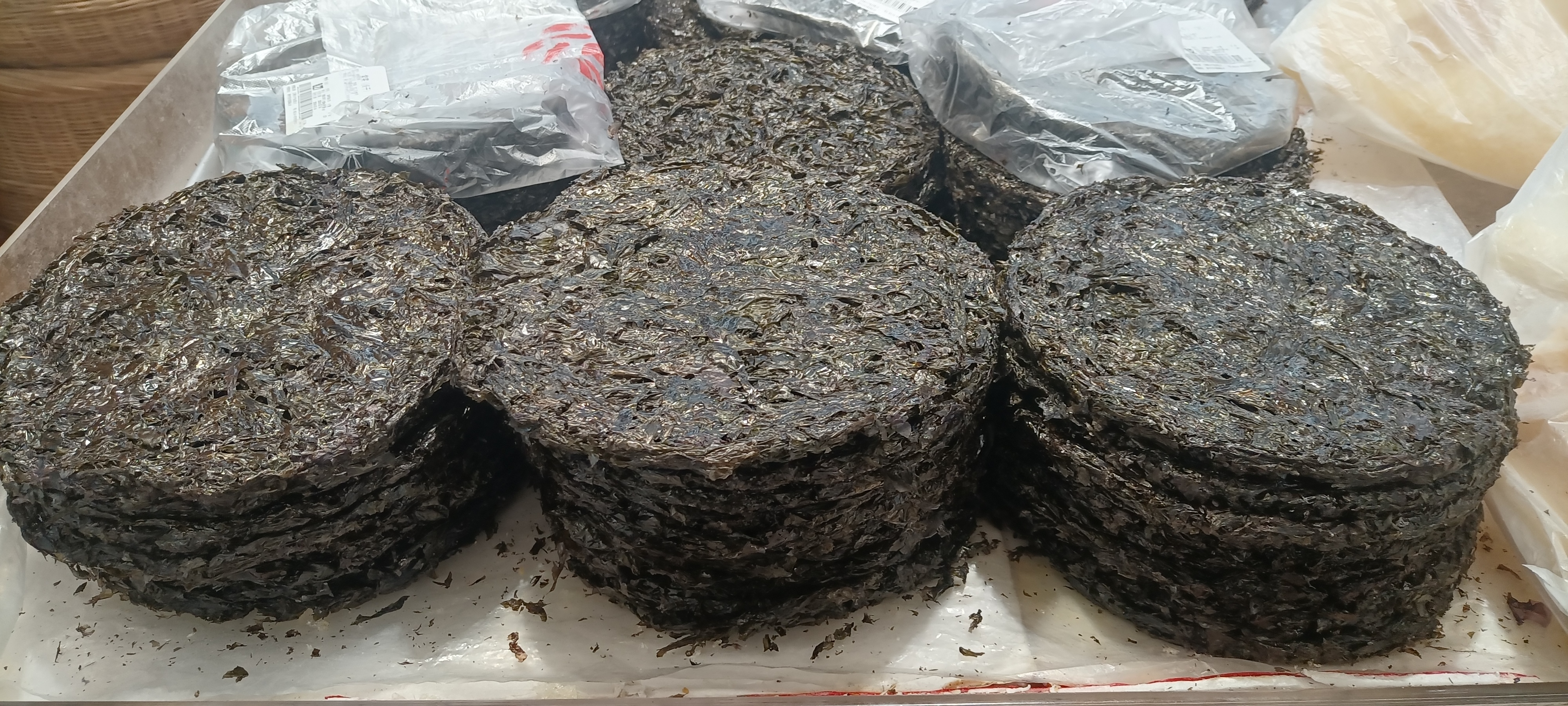
Dried pyropia

Within the genus Pyropia multiple species are used for nori (edible seaweed), Pyropia yezoensis and P. haitanensis being most popular. It is a two-billion-dollar industry with most major growers located in China, Korea, and Japan.

Nori contains substantial amounts of Vitamin B12 according to a 2014 paper. However, the Academy of Nutrition and Dietetics considers this source unreliable for vegans.

== Species ==
Pyropia currently contains 80 confirmed species.

- Pyropia abbottiae (V.Krishnamurthy) S.C.Lindstrom, 2011
- Pyropia acanthophora (E.C.Oliveira & Coll) M.C.Oliveira, D.Milstein & E.C.Oliveira, 2011
- Pyropia aeodes (N.J.Griffin, J.J.Bolton & R.J.Anderson) J.E.Sutherland, 2011
- Pyropia bajacaliforniensis L.E.Aguilar-Rosas & Hughey, 2015
- Pyropia brumalis (Mumford) S.C.Lindstrom, 2011
- Pyropia cinnamomea (W.A.Nelson) W.A.Nelson, 2011
- Pyropia collinsii Neefus, T.Bray & A.C.Mathieson, 2017
- Pyropia columbiensis S.C.Lindstrom, 2015
- Pyropia columbina (Montagne) W.A.Nelson, 2011
- Pyropia conwayae (S.C.Lindstrom & K.M.Cole) S.C.Lindstrom, 2011
- Pyropia crassa (Ueda) N.Kikuchi & M.Miyata, 2011
- Pyropia dentata (Kjellman) N.Kikuchi & M.Miyata, 2011
- Pyropia denticulata (Levring) J.A.Philips & J.E.Sutherland, 2011
- Pyropia drachii (Feldmann) J.Brodie, 2016
- Pyropia elongata (Kylin) Neefus & J.Brodie, 2011
- Pyropia endiviifolia (A.Gepp & E.Gepp) H.G.Choi & M.S.Hwang, 2011
- Pyropia fallax (S.C.Lindstrom & K.M.Cole) S.C.Lindstrom, 2011
- Pyropia francisii W.A.Nelson & R.D'Archino, 2014
- Pyropia fucicola (V.Krishnamurthy) S.C.Lindstrom, 2011
- Pyropia gardneri (G.M.Smith & Hollenberg) S.C.Lindstrom, 2011
- Pyropia haitanensis (T.J.Chang & B.F.Zheng) N.Kikuchi & M.Miyata, 2011
- Pyropia hiberna (S.C.Lindstrom & K.M.Cole) S.C.Lindstrom, 2011
- Pyropia hiemalis (Kylin) Varela-Álvarez, Guiry & Serrão, 2023
- Pyropia hollenbergii (E.Y.Dawson) J.E.Sutherland, L.E.Aguilar-Rosas & R.Aguilar-Rosas, 2011
- Pyropia ishigecola (A.Miura) N.Kikuchi & M.Miyata, 2011
- Pyropia islae Dumilag, 2018
- Pyropia kanakaensis (Mumford) S.C.Lindstrom, 2011
- Pyropia katadae (A.Miur) M.S.Hwang, H.G.Choi, N.Kikuchi & M.Miyata, 2011
- Pyropia kinositae (Yamada & Tak. Tanaka) N.Kikuchi, M.Miyata, M.S.Hwang & H.G.Choi, 2011
- Pyropia kitoi (Ma, Abe, N.Kikuchi, Tamaki, Tom. Sato, Murase, Fujiyoshi & Mas.Kobayasi) D.J.Kim, T.O.Cho & B.Y.Won, 2023
- Pyropia koreana (M.S.Hwang & I.K.Lee) M.S.Hwang, H.G.Choi Y.S.Oh & I.K.Lee, 2011
- Pyropia kuniedae (Kurogi) M.S.Hwang & H.G.Choi, 2011
- Pyropia kurogii (S.C.Lindstrom) S.C.Lindstrom, 2011
- Pyropia lacerata (A.Miura) N.Kikuchi & M.Miyata, 2011
- Pyropia lanceolata (Setchell & Hus) S.C.Lindstrom, 2011
- Pyropia leucosticta (Thuret) Neefus & J.Brodie, 2011
- Pyropia lunae Dumilag, 2018
- Pyropia meridionalis M.M.Reddy, R.J.Anderson & J.J.Bolton, 2020
- Pyropia montereyensis S.C.Lindstrom & Hughey, 2015
- Pyropia moriensis (Ohmi) N.Kikuchi & M.Miyata, 2011
- Pyropia nereocystis (C.L.Anderson) S.C.Lindstrom, 2011
- Pyropia nitida L.K.Harden, K.M.Morales & Hughey, 2015
- Pyropia njordii Mols-Mortensen, J.Brodie & Neefus, 2012
- Pyropia novae-angliae T.Bray, Neefus & A.C.Mathieson, 2017
- Pyropia onoi (Ueda) N.Kikuchi & M.Miyata, 2011
- Pyropia orbicularis M.E.Ramírez, L.Contreras Porcia & M.-L.Guillemin, 2014
- Pyropia parva A.Vergés & N.Sánchez, 2014
- Pyropia peggicovensis H.Kucera & G.W.Saunders, 2012
- Pyropia pendula (E.Y.Daywson) J.E.Sutherland, L.E.Aguilar-Rosas & R.Aguilar-Rosas, 2011
- Pyropia perforata (J.Agardh) S.C.Lindstrom, 2011
- Pyropia plicata W.A.Nelson, 2013
- Pyropia protolanceolata S.C.Lindstrom & J.R.Hughey, 2015
- Pyropia pseudolanceolata (V.Krishnamurthy) S.C.Lindstrom, 2011
- Pyropia pseudolinearis (Ueda) N.Kikuchi, M.Miyata, M.S.Hwang & H.G.Choi, 2011
- Pyropia pseudolobata (L.-E.Yang, J.Brodie & Q.-Q.Lu) Santiañez & M.J.Wynne, 2022
- Pyropia pulchella (Ackland, J.A.West, J.L.Scott & Zuccarello) T.J.Farr & J.E.Sutherland, 2011
- Pyropia pulchra (Hollenberg) S.C.Lindstrom & Hughey, 2016
- Pyropia rakiura (W.A.Nelson) W.A.Nelson, 2011
- Pyropia raulaguilarii Mateo-Cid, Mendoza-González & Sentíes, 2012
- Pyropia retorta S.-M.Kim, H.-G.Choi & H.-S.Kim, 2018
- Pyropia saldanhae (Stegenga, J.J.Bolton & R.J.Anderson) J.E.Sutherland, 2011
- Pyropia santacruzensis Guiry, 2023
- Pyropia seriata (Kjellman) N.Kikuchi & M.Miyata, 2011
- Pyropia spathulata T.Bray, Neefus & A.C.Mathieson, 2017
- Pyropia spiralis (E.C.Oliveira & Coll) M.C.Oliveira, D.Milstein & E.C.Oliveira, 2011
- Pyropia stamfordensis C.Neefus, T.Bray & A.C.Mathieson, 2017
- Pyropia submarina Y.H.Koh & M.S.Kim, 2018
- Pyropia suborbiculata (Kjellman) J.E.Sutherland, H.G.Choi, M.S.Hwang & W.A.Nelson, 2011
- Pyropia taeniata S.C.Lindstrom, 2015
- Pyropia tanegashimensis (Shinmura) N.Kikuchi & E. Fujiyoshi, 2011
- Pyropia tenera (Kjellman) N.Kikuchi, M.Miyata, M.S.Hwang & H.G.Choi, 2011
- Pyropia tenuipedalis (A.Miura) N.Kikuchi & M.Miyata, 2011
- Pyropia thulaea (Munda & P.M.Pedersen) Neefus, 2011
- Pyropia thuretii (Setchell & E.Y.Dawson) J.E.Sutherland, L.E.Aguilar Rosas & R.Aguilar Rosas, 2011
- Pyropia torta (V.Krishnamurthy) S.C.Lindstrom, 2011
- Pyropia unabbottiae S.C.Lindstrom, 2015
- Pyropia variabilis J.Zapata, A.Meynard, M.E.Ramírez & L.Contreras-Porcia, 2018
- Pyropia vietnamensis (Tak. Tanaka & P.H.Ho) J.E.Sutherland & Monotilla, 2011
- Pyropia virididentata (W.A.Nelson) W.A.Nelson, 2011
- Pyropia yezoensis (Ueda) M.S.Hwang & H.G.Choi, 2011 (unconfirmed) (Note: The most recent consensus is that this species belongs in Neopyropia (L.-E.Yang & J.Brodie, 2020), however WoRMS documents both species separately.)

== Gallery ==
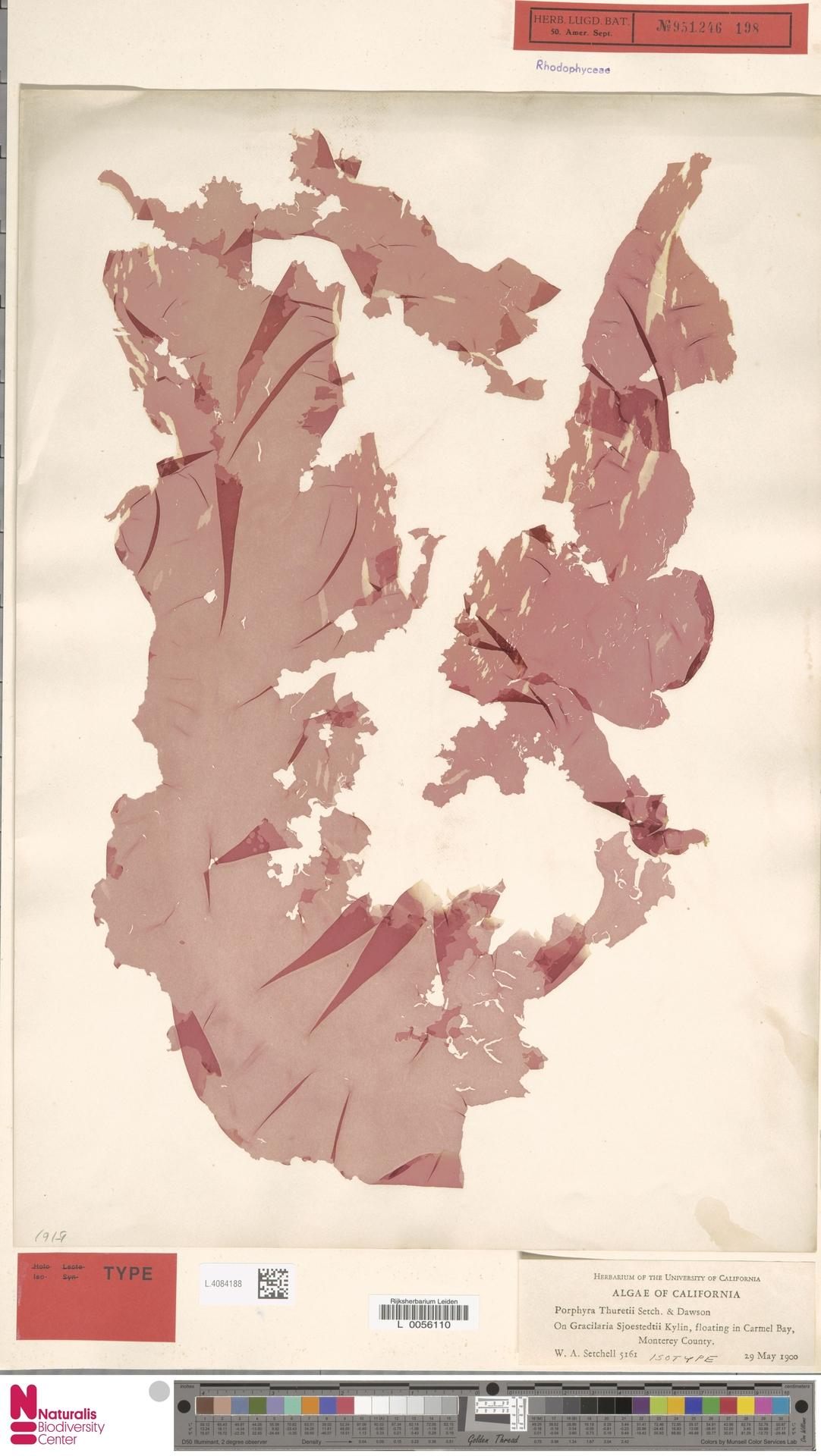

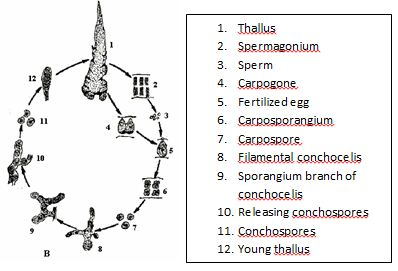

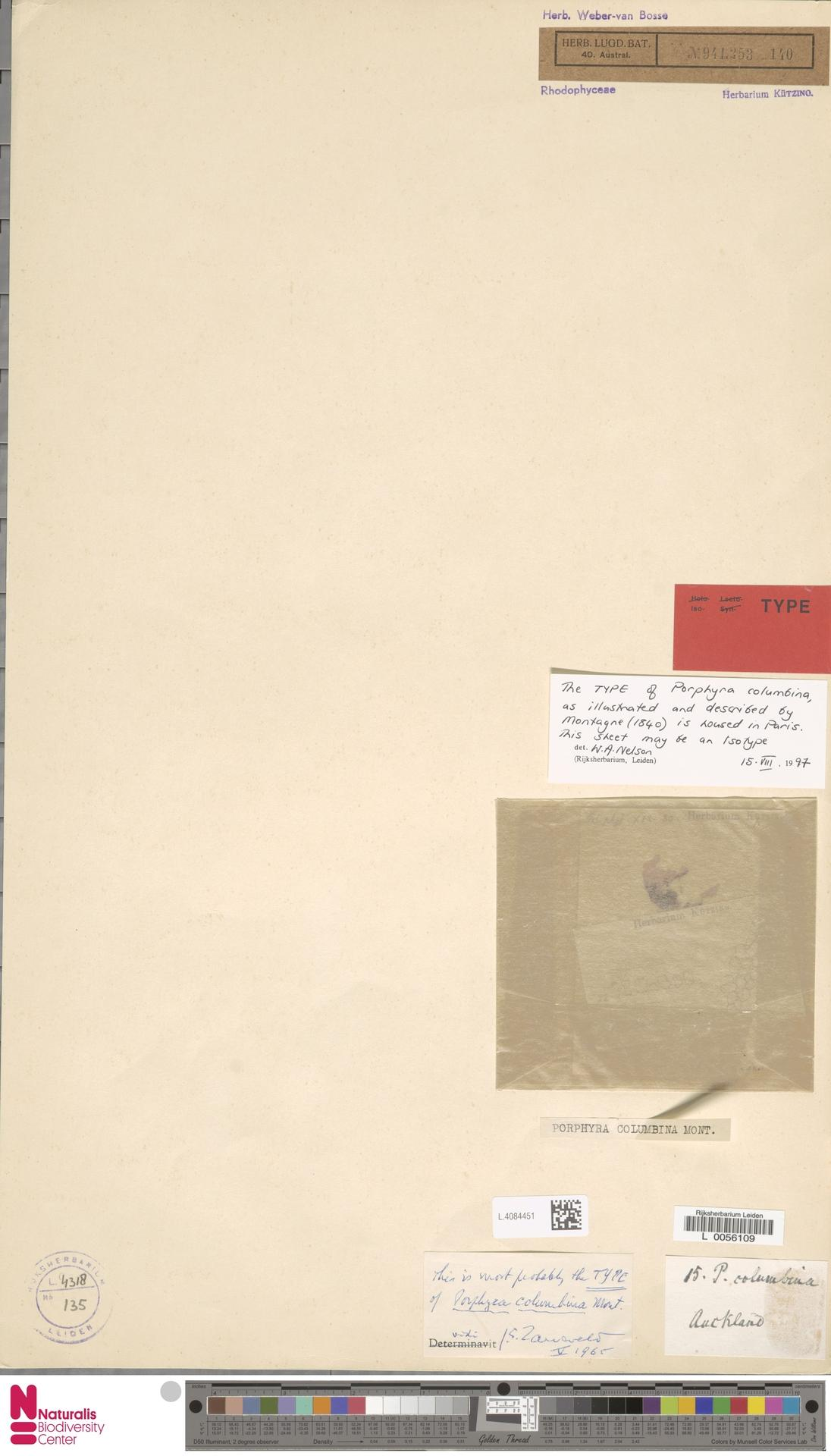
