= Porphyra linearis =

Scientific classification
- Domain: Eukaryota
- Clade: Archaeplastida
- Division: Rhodophyta
- Class: Bangiophyceae
- Order: Bangiales
- Family: Bangiaceae
- Genus: Porphyra
- Species: P. linearis

Binomial name
- Porphyra linearis Greville

Red alga

Porphyra linearis is a red alga found in the coastal waters of Japan. It has only four chromosomes (2n=4) a very low number shared only with the unrelated Haplopappus gracilis.
