= Pyropia cinnamomea =

Scientific classification
- Clade: Archaeplastida
- Division: Rhodophyta
- Class: Bangiophyceae
- Order: Bangiales
- Family: Bangiaceae
- Genus: Pyropia
- Species: P. cinnamomea

Binomial name
- Pyropia cinnamomea (W.A.Nelson) W.A.Nelson

Synonyms
- Porphyra cinnamomea W.A.Nelson

Species of alga

Pyropiacinnamomea is a red alga species in the genus Pyropia, known from New Zealand. It is monostromatic, monoecious, and grows in the intertidal zone, predominantly on rock substrata. With P. coleana, P. rakiura and P. virididentata, they can be distinguished by morphology (such as the microscopic arrangement of cells along their thallus margin, their thallus shape, size and colour), as well as geographical, ecological and seasonal distribution patterns, and importantly, chromosome numbers, which in this species n = 3. Finally, these four species are distinguished by a particular nucleotide sequence at the 18S rDNA locus.
