= Pyropia haitanensis =

Scientific classification
- Domain: Eukaryota
- Clade: Archaeplastida
- Division: Rhodophyta
- Class: Bangiophyceae
- Order: Bangiales
- Family: Bangiaceae
- Genus: Pyropia
- Species: P. haitanensis

Binomial name
- Pyropia haitanensis T.J.Chang & B.F.Zheng

Species of seaweed

Pyropia haitanensis (T.J.Chang & B.F.Zheng) N.Kikuchi & M.Miyata (a.k.a. Porphyra haitanensis) is a species of red algae, (also called tan zicai in Chinese).
