= Porphyra capensis =

Scientific classification
- Domain: Eukaryota
- Clade: Archaeplastida
- Division: Rhodophyta
- Class: Bangiophyceae
- Order: Bangiales
- Family: Bangiaceae
- Genus: Porphyra
- Species: P. capensis

Binomial name
- Porphyra capensis Kützing, 1843

Species of seaweed

Porphyra capensis is a species of red algae in the family of Bangiaceae. Its name stems from it being first described from a sample taken from the Cape of Good Hope. In addition to the coasts of South Africa, it has also been observed growing along the coasts of Namibia.
