= Desmosterolosis =

- Other names: Deficiency of 3beta-hydroxysterol delta24-reductase
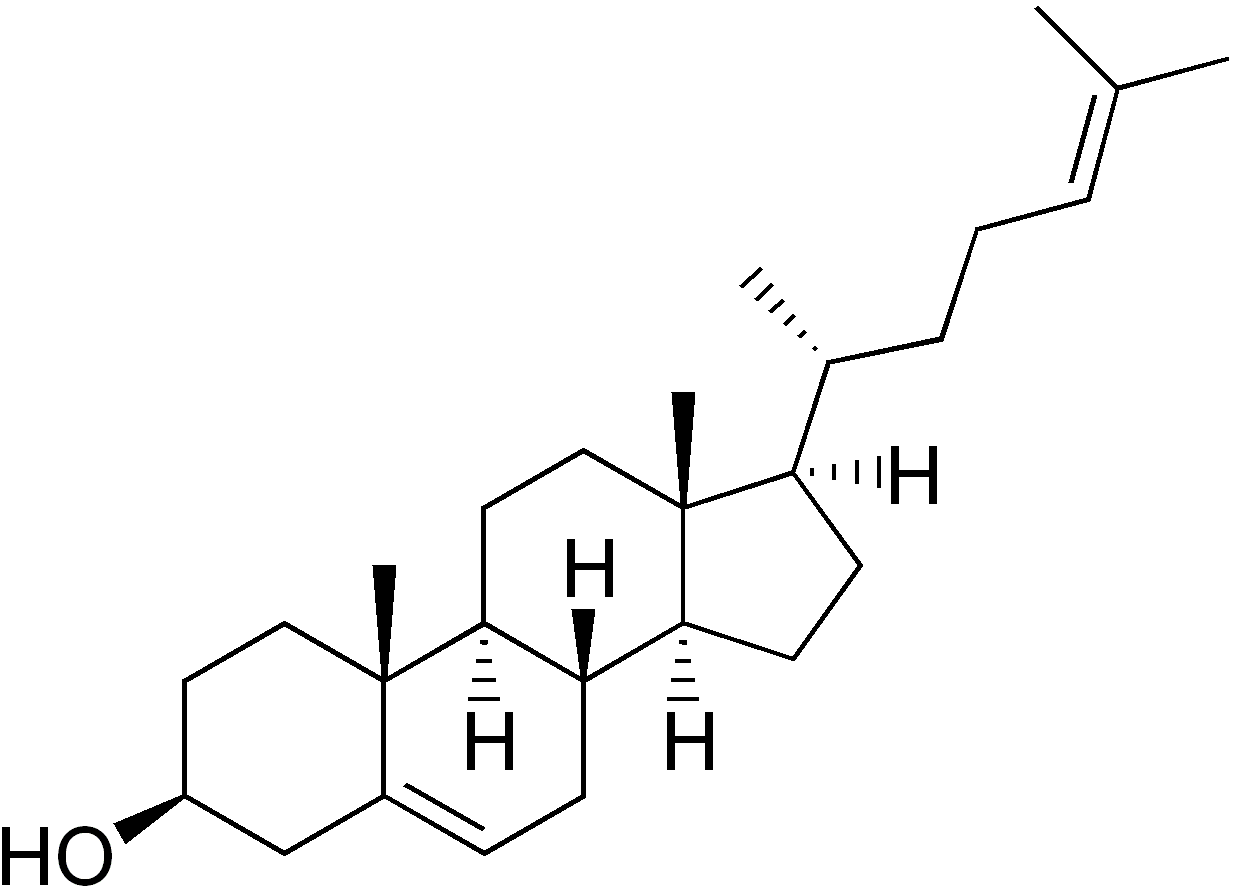
- Desmosterol

Desmosterolosis in medicine and biology is a defect in cholesterol biosynthesis. It results in an accumulation of desmosterol and a variety of associated symptoms. Only two cases have been reported as of 2007. The condition is due to inactivating mutations in 24-dehydrocholesterol reductase. Certain anticholesterolemic and antiestrogenic drugs such as triparanol, ethamoxytriphetol, and clomifene have been found to inhibit conversion of desmosterol into cholesterol and to induce desmosterolosis, for instance cataracts.
