= Pyropia elongata =

Scientific classification
- Domain: Eukaryota
- Clade: Archaeplastida
- Division: Rhodophyta
- Class: Bangiophyceae
- Order: Bangiales
- Family: Bangiaceae
- Genus: Pyropia
- Species: P. elongata

Binomial name
- Pyropia elongata (Kylin) Neefus & J.Brodie, 2011

Synonyms
- Porphyra elongata Kylin, 1907 Porphyra rosengurttii Coll & J.Cox, 1977

Species of seaweed

Pyropia elongata is a species of red algae whose name is derived from the Latin word meaning elongated. This species is most commonly found in the North Atlantic and Mediterranean regions.
