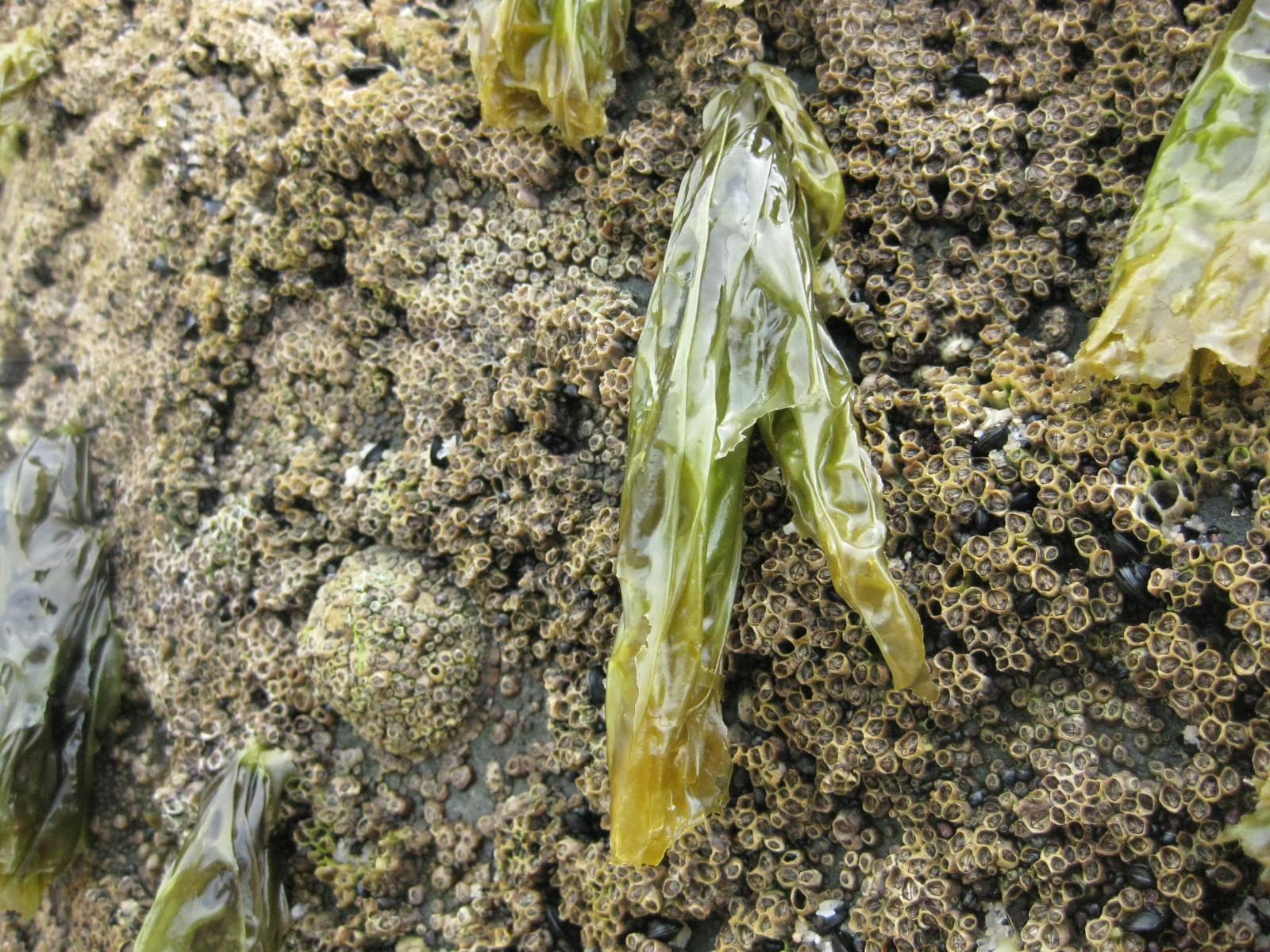

Scientific classification
- Domain: Eukaryota
- Clade: Archaeplastida
- Division: Rhodophyta
- Class: Bangiophyceae
- Order: Bangiales
- Family: Bangiaceae
- Genus: Clymene
- Species: C. coleana

Binomial name
- Clymene coleana (W.A.Nelson) W.A.Nelson, 2011

= Clymene coleana =

Species of alga

Clymene coleana, formerly known as Porphyra cinnamomea, is a red alga species in the family Bangiaceae. It is the only species in the monotypic genus Clymene. This species is endemic to New Zealand.

== Taxonomy ==
The genus name of Clymene is named after a Greek mythology nymph, Clymene (mother of Phaethon).

== Morphology and habitat ==
In winter C. coleana is grey in colour but in summer it bleaches to a golden colour. It has fine finger like lobes and has cells in a single layer and is monoecious. With P. cinnamomea, P. rakiura and P. virididentata, this species can be distinguished by morphology, such as the microscopic arrangement of cells along their thallus margin, their thallus shape, size and colour, as well as geographical, ecological and seasonal distribution patterns, and importantly, chromosome numbers, which in this species n = 4. Finally, these four species are distinguished by a particular nucleotide sequence at the 18S rDNA locus.

This species inhabits the upper parts of the intertidal zone on rock substrata on open coasts. It has fine finger like lobes and in winter is a grey colour. In summer however it bleaches to a golden colour.

== Distribution ==
This species is endemic to New Zealand and can be found on the coastline of the North, South and Chatham Islands.
