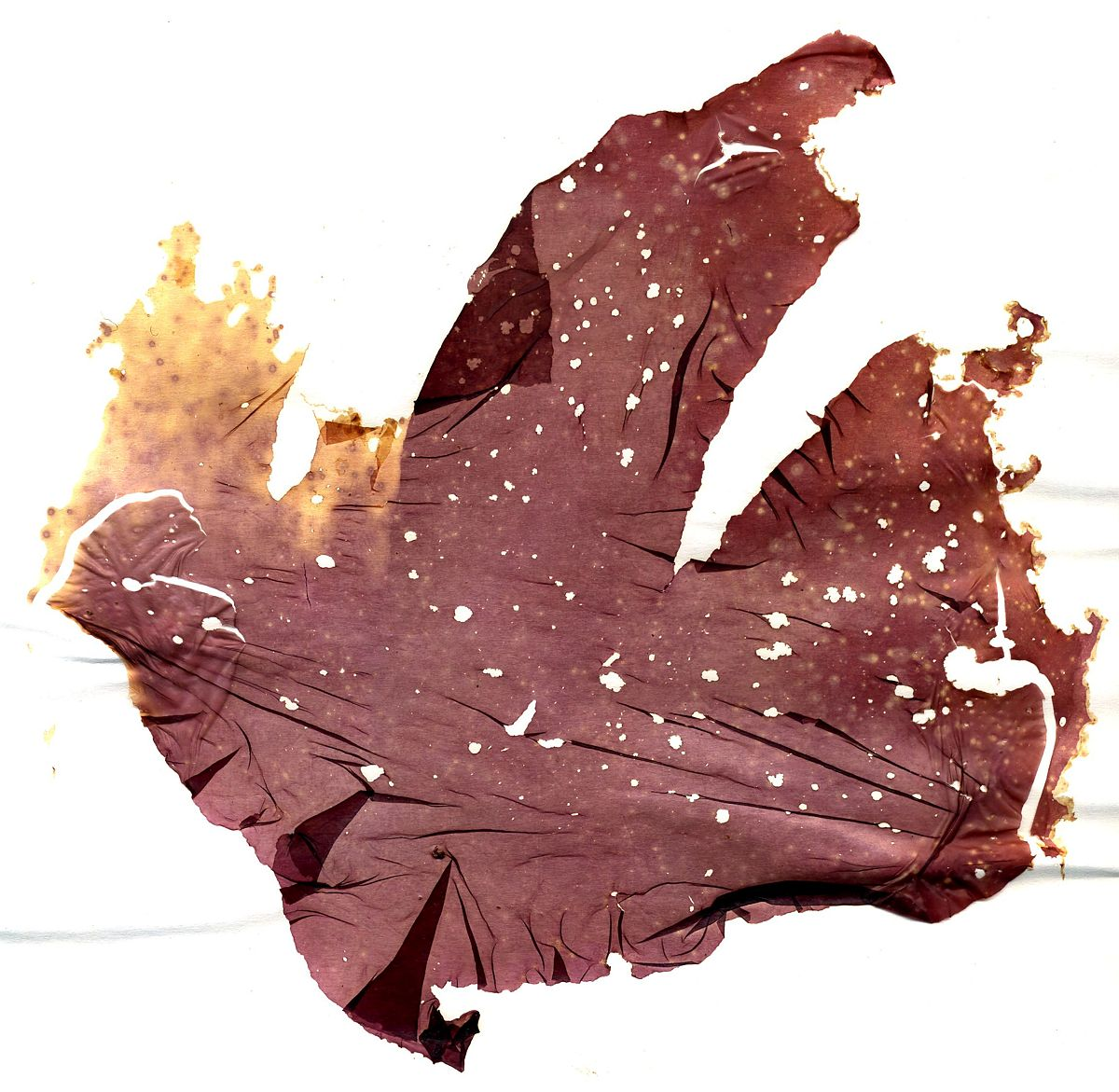
- Porphyra purpurea herbarium sheet

Scientific classification
- Domain: Eukaryota
- Clade: Archaeplastida
- Division: Rhodophyta
- Class: Bangiophyceae
- Order: Bangiales
- Family: Bangiaceae
- Genus: Porphyra
- Species: P. purpurea

Binomial name
- Porphyra purpurea (Roth) C. Agardh

= Porphyra purpurea =

Species of alga

Porphyra purpurea is a species of red algae in the order Bangiales.

== Description ==
This red alga consists of a single membranous layer of cells forming a blade attached by a disk holdfast. It grows to a length of 20 to 50 cm long. The blade has the texture of a thin polythene sheet.

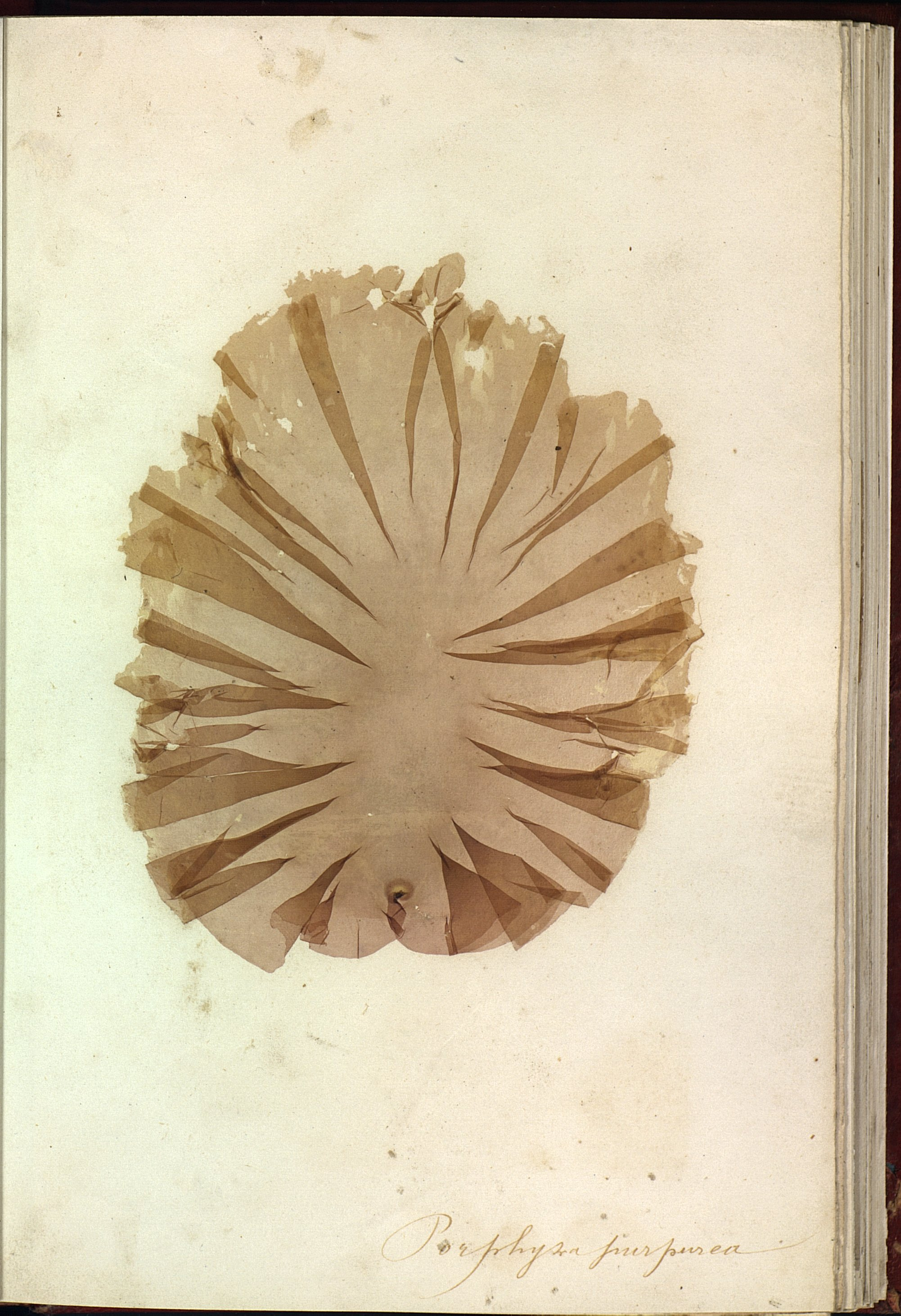

== Habitat ==
They are littoral, growing on rock, pebbles, limpets and barnacles.

== Distribution ==
Recorded from Canada and Europe. Common in Great Britain, Ireland and Isle of Man.
