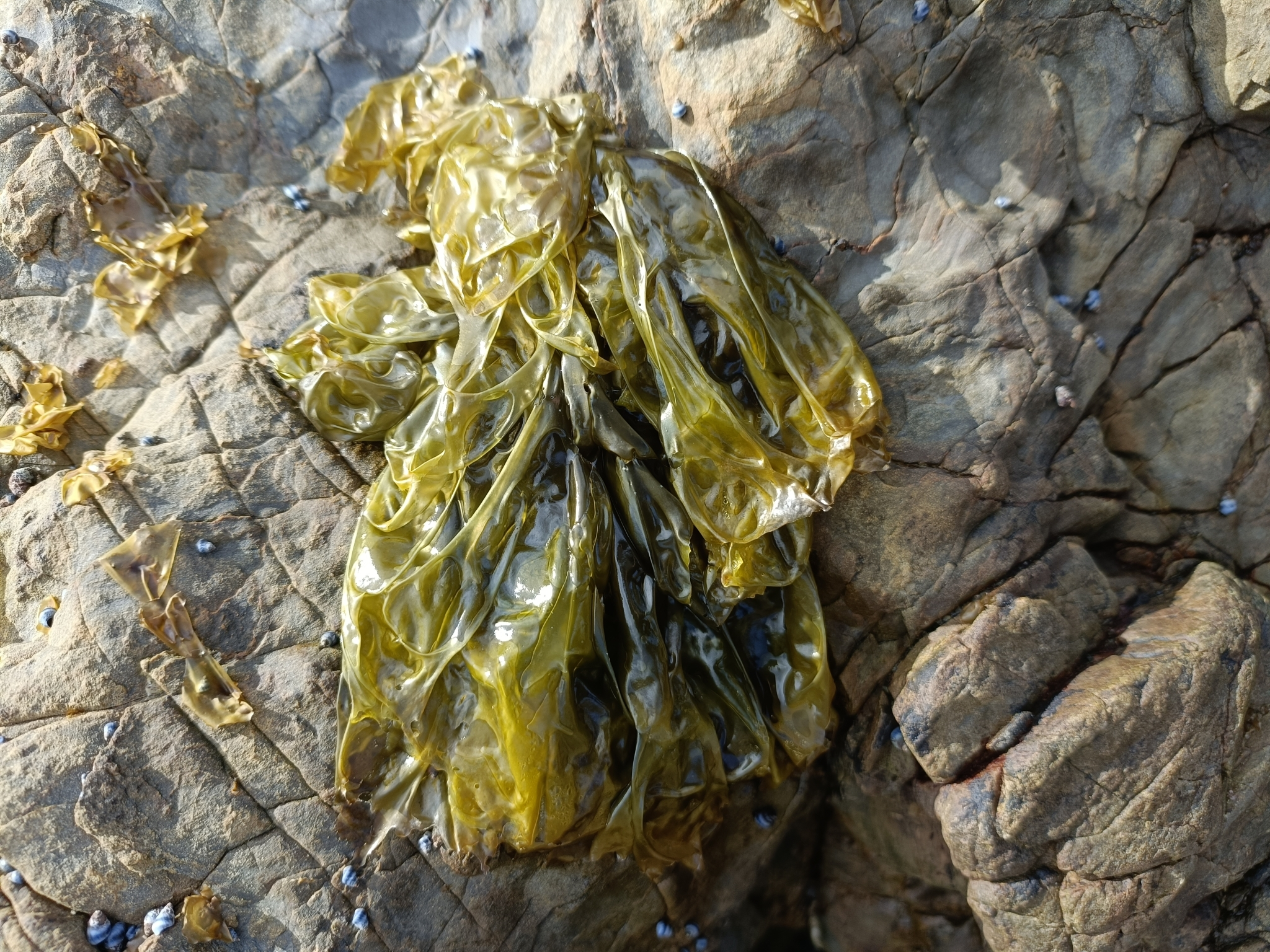
- Photo of Pyropia columbina

Scientific classification
- Domain: Eukaryota
- Clade: Archaeplastida
- Division: Rhodophyta
- Class: Bangiophyceae
- Order: Bangiales
- Family: Bangiaceae
- Genus: Pyropia
- Species: P. columbina

Binomial name
- Pyropia columbina (Montagne) W.A.Nelson

Synonyms
- Porphyra columbina Montagne

= Pyropia columbina =

Species of seaweed

Pyropia columbina, Southern laver, karengo in the Māori language and luche in the Spanish language, is a species of edible seaweed traditionally harvested by South Island Māori in New Zealand and Chilote people in Chile. It is closely related to Japanese Nori and Welsh laverbread.

During World War 2 the Māori Battalion were supplied especially with karengo harvested in New Zealand which they chewed raw while on the march. It is widely available only in health stores, and is sprinkled raw on top of food.

The type locality is the Auckland Islands, and the species authority is Montagne 1842. It is found around South America from Argentina, Chile and Peru, and around Australia and New Zealand including Macquarie Island. In the Chilean cuisine it is known as luche.

== Description ==
The morphology of this species is variable, the fronds vary in shape and color. They can measure up to 10 cm long, they are flat, lobed at the edges and in some cases wavy. The color can vary from light brown, yellow and in some cases with light red to discolored edges. In the margins, the reproductive structures are presented, which when they are released, have a whitish coloration.

== Gastronomy ==
In Chile the algae are collected from the shore, smoked or cured, then a kind of pressed tortilla is formed, also called "pan de luche" (luche loaf), which are marketed in craft markets in different parts of the country with greater emphasis on the South of Chile. This seaweed is used for the preparation of stews and casseroles, being famous in the country the dish known as cazuela chilota, a soup with Southern laver, potatoes and pieces of lamb.
