= Pyropia virididentata =

Scientific classification
- Domain: Eukaryota
- Clade: Archaeplastida
- Division: Rhodophyta
- Class: Bangiophyceae
- Order: Bangiales
- Family: Bangiaceae
- Genus: Pyropia
- Species: P. virididentata

Binomial name
- Pyropia virididentata WA Nelson, 2001, emended WA Nelson, 2011

Synonyms
- Porphyra virididentata

Species of alga

Pyropia virididentata, formerly known as Porphyra virididentata, is a red alga species in the genus Pyropia. It is endemic to New Zealand. It is monostromatic, monoecious, and grows in the intertidal zone, predominantly on rock substrata. With Porphyra cinnamomea, Pyropia rakiura and Clymene coleana, they can be distinguished by morphology (such as the microscopic arrangement of cells along their thallus margin, their thallus shape, size and colour), as well as geographical, ecological and seasonal distribution patterns, and importantly, chromosome numbers, which in this species n = 3. Finally, these four species are distinguished by a particular nucleotide sequence at the 18S rDNA locus.

The type locality of this species is Island Bay in Wellington. This species is found on the coasts of the lower part of the North Island and the South Island.

It is susceptible to infection by the parasitic oomycete Pythium porphyrae.
