= 24-Dehydrocholesterol reductase =

Mammalian protein found in humans

DHCR24

Identifiers
- Aliases: DHCR24, DCE, Nbla03646, SELADIN1, seladin-1, 24-dehydrocholesterol reductase
- External IDs: OMIM: 606418; MGI: 1922004; GeneCards: DHCR24
Enzyme activity
| EC # | BRENDA | ExPASy | KEGG | MetaCyc |
|---|---|---|---|---|
| 1.3.1.72 | ↗ | ↗ | ↗ | ↗ |

Gene location (Human)
| Chr. | Chromosome 1 (human) |
| Band | 1p32.3 | Start | 54,849,627 bp |
| Band | 1p32.3 | End | 54,887,195 bp |

Gene location (Mouse)
| Chr. | Chromosome 4 (mouse) |
| Band | 4|4 C7 | Start | 106,418,235 bp |
| Band | 4|4 C7 | End | 106,446,310 bp |
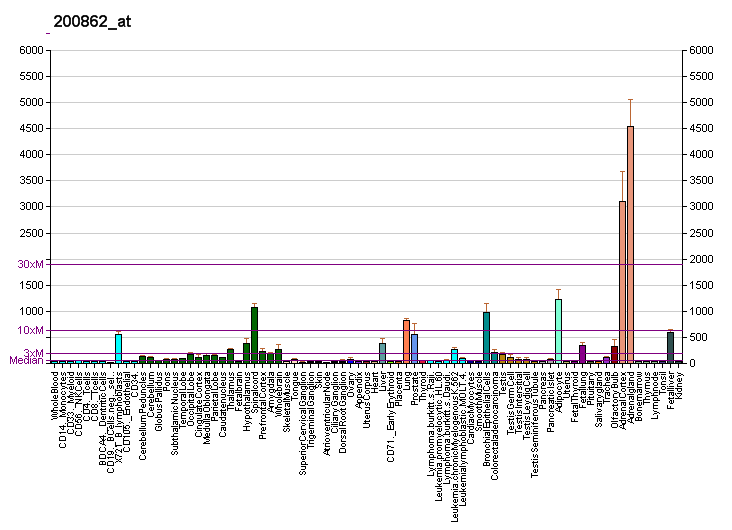
RNA expression pattern
| Bgee | Human / Mouse (ortholog); Top expressed in: right adrenal cortex; left adrenal gland; left adrenal cortex; C1 segment; right lobe of liver; lower lobe of lung; skin of thigh; skin of arm; vulva; nipple / Top expressed in: lip; skin of external ear; gastrula; yolk sac; intestinal villus; left lobe of liver; skin of abdomen; tail of embryo; epidermis; hair follicle; More reference expression data |
| BioGPS | More reference expression data |
Gene ontology
| Molecular function | peptide antigen binding; flavin adenine dinucleotide binding; oxidoreductase activity, acting on CH-OH group of donors; delta24(24-1) sterol reductase activity; oxidoreductase activity, acting on the CH-CH group of donors, NAD or NADP as acceptor; enzyme binding; oxidoreductase activity; delta24-sterol reductase activity; FAD binding |
| Cellular component | cytoplasm; integral component of membrane; cytosol; Golgi apparatus; endoplasmic reticulum membrane; membrane; Golgi membrane; endoplasmic reticulum; cytoskeleton; nucleus |
| Biological process | steroid biosynthetic process; protein localization; steroid metabolic process; negative regulation of cysteine-type endopeptidase activity involved in apoptotic process; male genitalia development; sterol biosynthetic process; lipid metabolism; negative regulation of apoptotic process; cholesterol metabolic process; response to oxidative stress; regulation of neuron death; tissue development; cholesterol biosynthetic process via lathosterol; response to hormone; sterol metabolic process; membrane organization; Ras protein signal transduction; plasminogen activation; cholesterol biosynthetic process via desmosterol; amyloid precursor protein catabolic process; negative regulation of cell population proliferation; skin development; apoptotic process; cholesterol biosynthetic process |
Sources:Amigo / QuickGO
Orthologs
| Databases | NCBI: entry; OMA: entry |
| Species | Human | Mouse |
| Entrez | 1718 | 74754 |
| Ensembl | ENSG00000116133 | ENSMUSG00000034926 |
| UniProt | Q15392 | Q8VCH6 |
| RefSeq (mRNA) | NM_014762 | NM_053272 |
| RefSeq (protein) | NP_055577 | NP_444502 |
| Location (UCSC) | Chr 1: 54.85 – 54.89 Mb | Chr 4: 106.42 – 106.45 Mb |
| PubMed search |
- Wikidata
| View/Edit Human | View/Edit Mouse |

24-Dehydrocholesterol reductase is a protein that in humans is encoded by the DHCR24 gene.

This gene encodes a flavin adenine dinucleotide (FAD)-dependent oxidoreductase, which catalyzes the reduction of the delta-24 double bond of sterol intermediates during cholesterol biosynthesis. The protein contains a leader sequence that directs it to the endoplasmic reticulum membrane. Missense mutations in this gene have been associated with desmosterolosis. Also, reduced expression of the gene occurs in the temporal cortex of Alzheimer's disease patients and overexpression has been observed in adrenal gland cancer cells.

== See also ==
- Steroidogenic enzyme
