= Pyropia rakiura =

Scientific classification
- Domain: Eukaryota
- Clade: Archaeplastida
- Division: Rhodophyta
- Class: Bangiophyceae
- Order: Bangiales
- Family: Bangiaceae
- Genus: Pyropia
- Species: P. rakiura

Binomial name
- Pyropia rakiura WA Nelson, 2001, emended WA Nelson, 2011

Species of alga

Pyropia rakiura, formerly known as Porphyra rakiura, is a red alga species in the genus Pyropia, known from New Zealand. It is monostromatic, monoecious, and grows in the intertidal zone, predominantly on rock substrata. With P. cinnamomea, P. coleana and P. virididentata, they can be distinguished by morphology (such as the microscopic arrangement of cells along their thallus margin, their thallus shape, size and colour), as well as geographical, ecological and seasonal distribution patterns, and importantly, chromosome numbers, which in this species n = 2. Finally, these four species are distinguished by a particular nucleotide sequence at the 18S rDNA locus.

== Distribution ==
This species can be found on the mid to low intertidal zone of coasts on the southern North Island, the South Island and Stewart Island in New Zealand as well as on the coasts of Australia.
