= Vasudeva Krishnamurthy =

Indian psychologist (1921–2014)

Vasudeva Krishnamurthy (1921–2014), nicknamed Prof. V.K., was an Indian algologist. He established Krishnamurthy Institute of Algology at Chennai to promote the study of algology.

Krishnamurthy, son of Sanskrit professor R. Vasudeva Sharma, was born on 14 August 1921 at Valavanur, Viluppuram district. He died in Tamil Nadu on 9 May 2014.

== Education ==
Krishnamurthy acquired a B.A. (1940, at St. Joseph's college, affiliated to Madras University) and a B.Sc. (Hons.) degree (1942, Presidency College, Madras University) at the University of Madras. University of Madras awarded him with the Pulny Gold Medal. He also gained an M.A. (1947, University of Madras), an M.Sc. (1952, Presidency College, Madras University) and a Ph.D. (1957, University of Manchester, England). At the age of 21, Krishnamurthy became a research scholar at the botany laboratory of the University of Madras and worked under the father of Indian algology, Prof. M.O.P. Iyengar.

== Career ==
Krishnamurthy was the reader in botany from 1943 to 1960. In 1960 he joined Thanjavur Medical College as a professor of biology, and as professor of microbiology and bacteriology in the Department of Public Health Engineering in the college of Engineering. In 1961 he joined Central Salts and Marine Chemicals Research Institute (CSIR), Bhavnagar, Gujarat as a scientist. After working in CSIR's laboratories for a decade (1961–1971) he returned to Tamil Nadu and served as professor of botany in various colleges. When he retired in 1979, he was principal at Arignar Anna Government Arts College for Men Namakkal.

== Contribution to algology ==
He started the Seaweed Research and Utilization Association to encourage research on seaweed in India. On behalf of this association he published the journal Seaweed Research Utilization. He was the founding president of the association and he served as president until he died. He founded Krishnamurthy Institute of Algology (KIA), Chennai, India. KIA has the largest library in Tamil Nadu on algal studies, and it is fully equipped for algal research. Prof. V. K. worked in this laboratory until his death.

== Some publications ==
1. Krishnamurthy, V. and M.Baluswami 1982 Some species of Ectocarpaceae new to India. Seaw. Res. & Util. 5(2):102–112.
2. Krishnamurthy, V. and M.Baluswami 1983 Some species of Ectocarpaceae new to India. Seaw. Res. & Util. 6(1):47–48.
3. Krishnamurthy, V. and M.Baluswami 1984 The species of Porphyra from the Indian region. Seaw. Res.& Util. 7(1):31–38
4. Krishnamurthy, V. and M.Baluswami 1986 On Mesospora schmidtii Weber van Bosse(Ralfsiaceae, Phaeophyceae) from the AndamanIslands. Curr. Sci. 55(12):571–572.
5. Krishnamurthy, V., A.Balasundaram, M. Baluswami and K.Varadarajan 1990 Vertical distribution of marine algae on the east coast of South India. In:Ed. V.N.Raja Rao, Perspectives in Phycology, Today & Tomorrow's Printers and Publishers, New Delhi, pp. 267–281
6. Krishnamurthy, V. and M.Baluswami 1988 A new species of Sphacelaria Lyngbyefrom South India. Seaw. Res. & Util.11(1):67–69
7. Baluswami, M. and M. Rajasekaran 2000 Morphology of Draparnaldiopsis krishnamurthyi Baluswami and Rajasekaranfrom Kambakkam, Andhra Pradesh. Ind. Hydrobiol. 3: 39–42
8. Krishnamurthy, V. and M.Baluswami 2000 Some new species of algae from India. Ind. Hydrobiol. 3(1):45–48
9. Rajasulochana, N. M.Baluswami, M.D. Vijaya Parthasarathy and V.Krishnamurthy 2002 Short term chemical analysis of Grateloupia lithophila Boergesen from Kovalam, near Chennai. Ind. Hydrobiol. 5(2): 155–161.
10. Rajasulochana, N., M.Baluswami, M.D. Vijaya Parthasarathy and V.Krishnamurthy 2002 Chemical analysis of Grateloupia lithophila Boergesen. Seaw.Res. & Utiln. 24(1): 79–82.
11. Angelin, T. Sylvia, M.Baluswami, M.D. Vijaya Parthasarathy and V.Krishnamurthy 2004 Physico-chemical properties of carrageenans extracted from Sarconema filiforme and Hypnea valentiae. Seaw. Res. & Utiln. 26(1&2): 197–207.
12. Kanthimathi, V., M. Baluswami and V. Krishnamurthy 2004 Pithophora polymorpha Wittrock from Mahabalipuram near Chennai. Seaw. Res. Utiln. 26 (Special issue):33–37.
13. Rajasulochana, N., M.Baluswami, M.D. Vijaya Parthasarathy and V.Krishnamurthy 2005 Seasonal variation in bio-chemical constituents of Grateloupia lithophila Boergesen. Seaw. Res. & Utiln. 27(1&2):53–56.
14. Sylvia, S. M. Baluswami, M.D. Vijaya Parthasarathy and V. Krishnamurthy 2005 Effect of liquid seaweed fertilizers extracted from Gracilaria edulis (Gmel.)Silva, Sargassum wightii Greville and Ulva lactuca Linn. On the growth and yield of Abelmoschus esculentus (L.) Moench. Indian Hydrobiology,7 (Supplement): 69–88.
15. Babu.B. and M. Baluswami 2005 Tuomeya Americana (Kuetzing) Papenfuss, a fresh-water redalga, new to India. Indian Hydrobiology, 8(1):1–4.
16. Rajasulochana, N., M.Baluswami, M.D. Vijaya Parthasarathy and V. Krishnamurthy 2006 Seasonal variation in major metabolic products of some marine Rhodophyceae from the south east coast of Tamil Nadu. Ind. Hydrobiol. 9(2):317–321
17. Rajasulochana, N., M.Baluswami, M.D. Vijaya Parthasarathy and V. Krishnamurthy 2007 Diversity of phycocolloids in selected members of Rhodomelaceae. Ind. Hydrobiol. 10(1):145–151.
18. Rajasulochana, N., M.Baluswami, M.D. Vijaya Parthasarathy and V. Krishnamurthy 2008 a FT-IR spectroscopic of investigations on the agars from Centroceras clavulatum and Spyridia hypnoides. Int. J. Phycol. Phycochem. 4(2):125–130.
19. Rajasulochana, N., M.Baluswami, M.D. Vijaya Parthasarathy and V. Krishnamurthy 2008 b Seasonal variation in cell wall polysaccharides of Grateloupia filicina and Grateloupia lithophila. Seaweed Res. Utiln. 30(1&2):161–169.
