= List of brown algal genera =

Biological classification list

This is a list of the orders, families and genera in the class Phaeophyceae — the brown algae.

== Discosporangiophycidae ==
=== Discosporangiales ===
==== Choristocarpaceae ====
- Choristocarpus Zanardini 1860

==== Discosporangiaceae ====
- Discosporangiumtite Falkenberg 1878

== Ishigeophycidae ==
- Diplura Hollenberg 1969

=== Ishigeales ===
==== Ishigeaceae ====
- Ishige Yendo 1907

==== Petrodermataceae ====
- Petroderma Kuckuck 1897

== Dictypophycidae ==
=== Syringodermatales ===
==== Syringodermataceae ====
- Microzonia Agardh 1984
- Syringoderma Levring 1940

=== Onslowiales ===
==== Onslowiaceae ====
- Onslowia Searles 1980
- Verosphacella Henry 1987

=== Dictyotales ===
==== Dictyotaceae ====
- Canistrocarpus De Paula & De Clerck 2006
- Chlanidophora Agardh 1894 non Berg 1877
- Dictyopteris Lamouroux 1809a nom. cons.
- Dictyota Lamouroux 1809b nom. cons. [Dilophus Agardh 1882; Glossophora Agardh 1882; Glossophorella Nizamuddin & Campbell 1995; Pachydictyon Agardh 1894]
- Dictyopsis Troll 1931
- Distromium Levring 1940
- Exallosorus Phillips 1997
- Herringtonia Kraft 2009
- Homoeostrichus Agardh 1894
- Lobophora Agardh 1894 [Pocockiella Papenfuss 1943]
- Lobospira Areschoug 1854
- Newhousia Kraft et al. 2004
- Padina Adanson 1793 nom. cons. [Dictyerpa Collins & Harvey 1901; Vaughaniella Borgesen 1950]
- Padinopsis Ercegovic 1955
- Rugulopteryx De Cerck & Coppejans 2006
- Scoresbyella Womersley 1987
- Spatoglossum Kutzing 1843
- Stoechospermum Kutzing 1843
- Stypopodium Kutzing 1843
- Taonia Agardh 1848
- Zonaria Agardh 1817

=== Sphacelariales ===
==== Lithodermataceae ====
- Bodanella Zimmermann 1927
- Heribaudiella Gomont 1896
- Lithoderma Areschoug 1875
- Pseudolithoderma Svedelius 1910

==== Phaeostrophionaceae ====
- Phaeostrophion Setchell & Gardner 1924

==== Sphacelodermaceae ====
- Sphaceloderma Kuckuck 1894

==== Stypocaulaceae ====
- Alethocladus
- Halopteris Kutzing 1843 [Stypocaulon Kutzing 1843]
- Phloiocaulon Geyler 1866
- Protohalopteris Draisma, Prud'homme & Kawai 2010
- Ptilopogon Reinke 1890

==== Cladostephaceae ====
- Cladostephus Agardh 1817

==== Sphacelariaceae ====
- Battersia Reinke ex Batters 1890 emend. Draisma, Prud'homme & Kawai 2010
- Chaetopteris Kutzing 1843
- Herpodiscus South 1974 emend. Draisma, Prud'homme & Kawai 2010
- Sphacelaria Lyngbye 1818
- Sphacella Reinke 1890
- Sphacelorbus Draisma, Prud'homme & Kawai 2010

== Fucophycidae ==
=== Asterocladales ===
==== Asterocladaceae ====
- Asterocladon Müller, Parodi & Peters 1998

=== Ascoseirales ===
==== Ascoseiraceae ====
- Ascoseira Skottsberg 1907

=== Cutleriales ===
==== Cutleriaceae ====
- Cutleria
- Zanardinia

=== Desmarestiales ===
==== Arthrocladiaceae ====
- Arthrocladia

==== Desmarestiaceae ====
- Desmarestia
- Himantothallus
- Phaeurus

=== Ectocarpales ===
==== Acinetosporaceae ====
- Acinetospora
- Feldmannia
- Geminocarpus
- Hincksia
- Pogotrichum
- Pylaiella

==== Adenocystaceae ====
- Adenocystis
- Caepidium
- Utriculidium

==== Chordariaceae ====
- Acrothrix
- Ascoseirophila
- Asperococcus
- Austrofilum
- Chordaria
- Cladosiphon
- Corycus
- Delamarea
- Dictyosiphon
- Elachista
- Eudesme
- Giraudia
- Gononema
- Halothrix
- Haplogloia
- Hecatonema
- Heterosaundersella
- Hummia
- Isthmoplea
- Laminariocolax
- Laminarionema
- Leathesia
- Leptonematella
- Litosiphon
- Microspongium
- Mikrosyphar
- Myelophycus
- Myriogloea
- Myrionema
- Myriotrichia
- Papenfussiella
- Petrospongium
- Pleurocladia
- Polytretus
- Proselachista
- Protectocarpus
- Punctaria
- Sauvageaugloia
- Soranthera
- Sorocarpus
- Spermatochnus
- Sphaerotrichia
- Stictyosiphon
- Streblonema
- Striaria
- Stschapovia
- Tinocladia

==== Chordariopsidaceae ====
- Chordariopsis

==== Ectocarpaceae ====
- Ectocarpus
- Kuckuckia

==== Mesosporaceae ====
- Mesospora

==== Myrionemataceae ====
- Asterotrichia

==== Pylaiellaceae ====
- Bachelotia

=== Fucales ===
==== Bifurcariopsidaceae ====
- Bifurcariopsis

==== Durvillaeaceae ====
- Durvillaea

==== Fucaceae ====
- Ascophyllum
- Fucus
- Hesperophycus
- Pelvetia
- Pelvetiopsis
- Silvetia
- Xiphophora

==== Himanthaliaceae ====
- Himanthalia

==== Hormosiraceae ====
- Hormosira

==== Notheiaceae ====
- Notheia

==== Sargassaceae ====
- Anthophycus
- Axillariella
- Bifurcaria
- Bifurcariopsis
- Carpoglossum
- Caulocystis
- Coccophora
- Cystophora
- Cystoseira
- Ericaria
- Gongolaria
- Halidrys
- Hizikia
- Hormophysa
- Myagropsis
- Myogropsis
- Myriodesma
- Polycladia
- Sargassum
- Sargassopsis
- Sirophysalis
- Stephanocystis
- Stolonophora
- Turbinaria

==== Seirococcaceae ====
- Cystophaera
- Marginariella
- Phyllospora
- Seirococcus

=== Laminariales ===
==== Akkesiphycaceae ====
- Akkesiphycus

==== Alariaceae ====
- Alaria
- Aureophycus
- Druehlia
- Eualaria
- Hirome
- Lessoniopsis
- Pleurophycus
- Pterygophora
- Undaria
- Undariella
- Undariopsis

==== Chordaceae ====
- Chorda

==== Costariaceae ====
- Agarum
- Costaria
- Dictyoneurum
- Thalassiophyllum

==== Laminariaceae ====
- Arthrothamnus
- Costularia
- Cymathere
- Feditia
- Gigantea
- Laminaria
- Macrocystis
- Nereocystis
- Pelagophycus
- Pelagophycus x Macrocystis
- Phycocastanum
- Phyllariella
- Polyschidea
- Postelsia
- Pseudolessonia
- Saccharina
- Streptophyllopsis

==== Lessoniaceae ====
- Ecklonia
- Eckloniopsis
- Egregia
- Eisenia
- Lessonia

==== Pseudochordaceae ====
- Pseudochorda

=== Nemodermatales ===
==== Nemodermataceae ====
- Nemoderma

=== Ralfsiales ===
==== Neoralfsiaceae ====
- Neoralfsia

==== Ralfsiaceae ====
- Basispora
- Hapalospongidion
- Jonssonia
- Myrionemopsis
- Porterinema
- Ralfsia

=== Scytosiphonales ===
==== Chnoosporaceae ====
- Chnoospora

==== Scytosiphonaceae ====
- Colpomenia
- Hydroclathrus
- Petalonia
- Rosenvingea
- Scytosiphon
- Coelocladia
- Phaeostroma

=== Scytothamnales ===
==== Scytothamnaceae ====
- Asteronema
- Scytothamnus
- Stereocladon

==== Splachnidiaceae ====
- Splachnidium

=== Sporochnales ===
==== Sporochnaceae ====
- Austronereia
- Bellotia
- Carpomitra
- Encyothalia
- Nereia
- Perisporochnus
- Perithalia
- Sporochnema
- Sporochnus
- Tomaculopsis

=== Tilopteridales ===
==== Halosiphonaceae ====
- Halosiphon

==== Masonophycaceae ====
- Masonophycus

==== Phyllariaceae ====
- Phyllariopsis
- Saccorhiza

==== Stschapoviaceae ====
- Stschapovia

==== Tilopteridaceae ====
- Haplospora
- Phaeosiphoniella
- Tilopteris

=== Incertae sedis ===
- Neoleptonema

==== Heterochordariaceae ====
- Analipus
