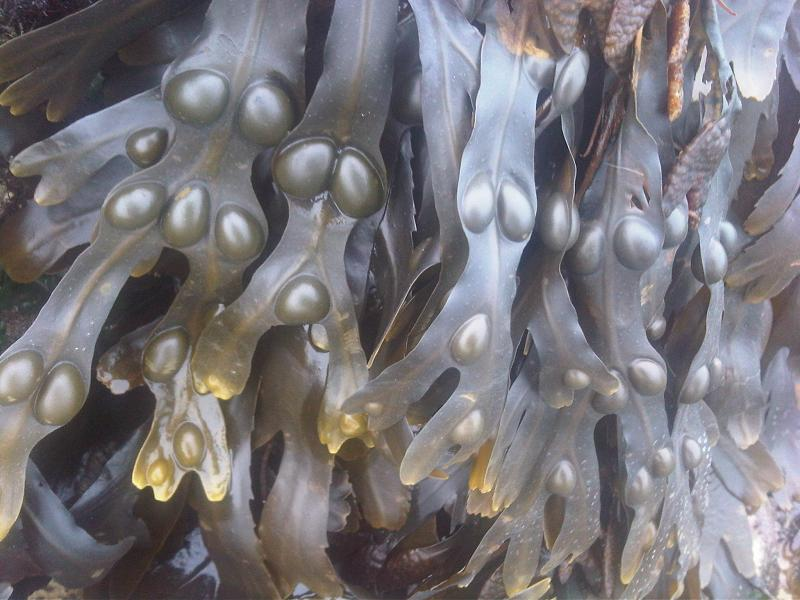
- Fucus vesiculosus

Scientific classification
- Domain: Eukaryota
- Clade: Sar
- Clade: Stramenopiles
- Phylum: Ochrophyta
- Class: Phaeophyceae
- Subclass: Fucophycidae

= Fucophycidae =

Subclass of brown algae

Fucophycidae is a subclass of Phaeophyceae (brown algae) which contains the most complex and evolved orders of Chromista algae. The members of this subclass have stalks with several morphological forms and distinct structures, characterized by an intercalary growth and a basic heteromorphic, sometimes secondarily iso- or sub-isomorphic life cycle.

== Taxonomy ==
- Subclass Fucophycidae Cavalier-Smith 1986
  - Order Ascoseirales Petrov1964 emend. Moe & Henry 1982
    - Family Ascoseiraceae Skottsberg 1907
  - Order Asterocladales T.Silberfeld et al. 2011
    - Family Asterocladaceae Silberfeld et al. 2011
  - Order Desmarestiales Setchell & Gardner 1925
    - Family Arthrocladiaceae Chauvin 1842
    - Family Desmarestiaceae (Thuret) Kjellman 1880
  - Order Ectocarpales Bessey 1907 emend. Rousseau & Reviers 1999a [Chordariales Setchell & Gardner 1925; Dictyosiphonales Setchell & Gardner 1925; Scytosiphonales Feldmann 1949]
    - Family Acinetosporaceae Hamel ex Feldmann 1937 [Pylaiellaceae; Pilayellaceae]
    - Family Adenocystaceae Rousseau et al. 2000 emend. Silberfeld et al. 2011 [Chordariopsidaceae]
    - Family Chordariaceae Greville 1830 emend. Peters & Ramírez 2001 [Myrionemataceae]
    - Family Ectocarpaceae Agardh 1828 emend. Silberfeld et al. 2011
    - Family Petrospongiaceae Racault et al. 2009
    - Family Scytosiphonaceae Ardissone & Straforello 1877 [Chnoosporaceae Setchell & Gardner 1925]
  - Order Fucales Bory de Saint-Vincent 1827 [Notheiales Womersley 1987; Durvillaeales Petrov 1965]
    - Family Bifurcariopsidaceae Cho et al. 2006
    - Family Durvillaeaceae (Oltmanns) De Toni 1891
    - Family Fucaceae Adanson 1763
    - Family Himanthaliaceae (Kjellman) De Toni 1891
    - Family Hormosiraceae Fritsch 1945
    - Family Notheiaceae Schmidt 1938
    - Family Sargassaceae Kützing 1843 [Cystoseiraceae De Toni 1891]
    - Family Seirococcaceae Nizamuddin 1987
    - Family Xiphophoraceae Cho et al. 2006
  - Order Laminariales Migula 1909 [Phaeosiphoniellales Silberfeld, Rousseau & Reviers 2014 ord. nov. prop.]
    - Family Agaraceae Postels & Ruprecht 1840 [Costariaceae]
    - Family Akkesiphycaceae Kawai & Sasaki 2000
    - Family Alariaceae Setchell & Gardner 1925
    - Family Aureophycaceae Kawai & Ridgway 2013
    - Family Chordaceae Dumortier 1822
    - Family Laminariaceae Bory de Saint-Vincent 1827 [Arthrothamnaceae Petrov 1974]
    - Family Lessoniaceae Setchell & Gardner 1925
    - Family Pseudochordaceae Kawai & Kurogi 1985
  - Order Nemodermatales Parente et al. 2008
    - Family Nemodermataceae Kuckuck ex Feldmann 1937
  - Order Phaeosiphoniellales Silberfeld, Rousseau & Reviers 2014
    - Family Phaeosiphoniellaceae Phillips et al. 2008
  - Order Ralfsiales Nakamura ex Lim & Kawai 2007
    - Family Mesosporaceae Tanaka & Chihara 1982
    - Family Neoralfsiaceae Lim & Kawai 2007
    - Family Ralfsiaceae Farlow 1881 [Heterochordariaceae Setchell & Gardner 1925]
  - Order Scytothamnales Peters & Clayton 1998 emend. Silberfeld et al. 2011
    - Family Asteronemataceae Silberfeld et al. 2011
    - Family Bachelotiaceae Silberfeld et al. 2011
    - Family Splachnidiaceae Mitchell & Whitting 1892 [Scytothamnaceae Womersley 1987]
  - Order Sporochnales Sauvageau 1926
    - Family Sporochnaceae Greville 1830
  - Order Tilopteridales Bessey 1907 emend. Phillips et al. 2008 [Cutleriales Bessey 1907]
    - Family Cutleriaceae Griffith & Henfrey 1856
    - Family Halosiphonaceae Kawai & Sasaki 2000
    - Family Phyllariaceae Tilden 1935
    - Family Stschapoviaceae Kawai 2004
    - Family Tilopteridaceae Kjellman 1890
