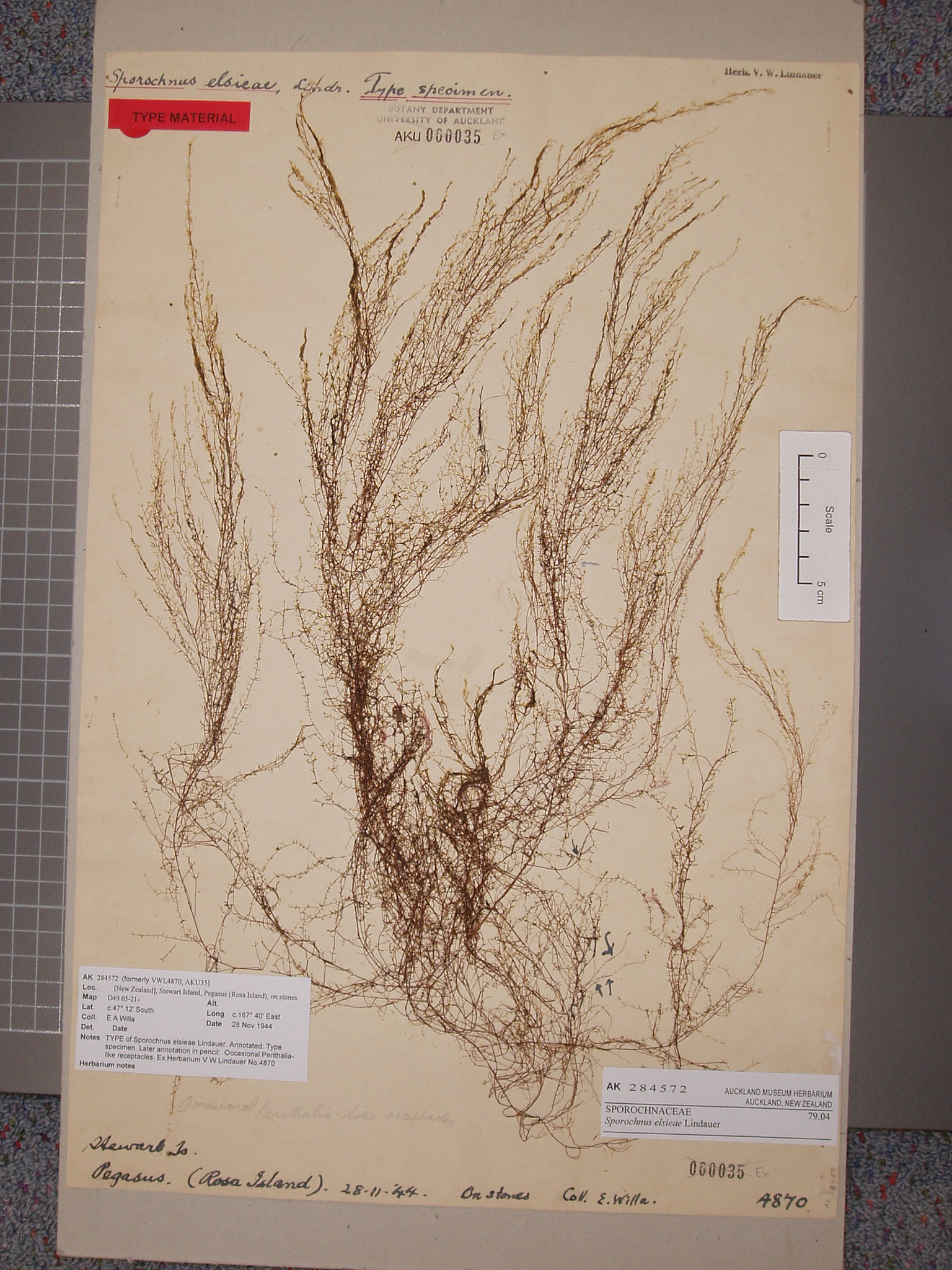
- (AM AK284572-2); Type specimen

Scientific classification
- Domain: Eukaryota
- Clade: Diaphoretickes
- Clade: Sar
- Clade: Stramenopiles
- Phylum: Gyrista
- Subphylum: Ochrophytina
- Class: Phaeophyceae
- Order: Sporochnales
- Family: Sporochnaceae
- Genus: Sporochnus
- Species: S. elsieae

Binomial name
- Sporochnus elsieae Lindauer, 1960

= Sporochnus elsieae =

Species of alga

Sporochnus elsieae is a marine brown algal species in the family Sporochnaceae, endemic to New Zealand. It was first described in 1960 by Victor Lindauer who gave it the specific epithet, elsieae, in honour of his wife, Elsie.

Lindauer comments that its "most remarkable feature is the series of bull-rush like receptacles along the axes of the branchlets".

== Distribution ==
It is found on Stewart Island on stones in the sub-littoral.

== See also ==
- Lindauer, V.W., Chapman, V.J. & Aiken, M. (1961). "The marine algae of New Zealand. II. Phaeophyceae". Nova Hedwigia. 3: 129–350, Plates 57–97.
- Silberfeld, T.; Rousseau, F.; de Reviers, Br. (2014). "An Updated Classification of Brown Algae (Ochrophyta, Phaeophyceae)". Cryptogamie, Algologie. 35 (2): 117–156. doi:10.7872/crya.v35.iss2.2014.117. ISSN 0181-1568. S2CID 86227768.
