= Ishige sinicola =

Scientific classification
- Domain: Eukaryota
- Clade: Sar
- Clade: Stramenopiles
- Division: Ochrophyta
- Class: Phaeophyceae
- Order: Ishigeales
- Family: Ishigeaceae
- Genus: Ishige
- Species: I. sinicola

Binomial name
- Ishige sinicola (Setchell & N.L.Gardner) Chihara, 1969

Species of algae

Ishige sinicola is a species of brown algae in the family Ishigeaceae. This species occurs as an epiphyte on Ishige okamurae in Japan, Korea, and China, but also occurs alone along the northern coast of the Gulf of California.
