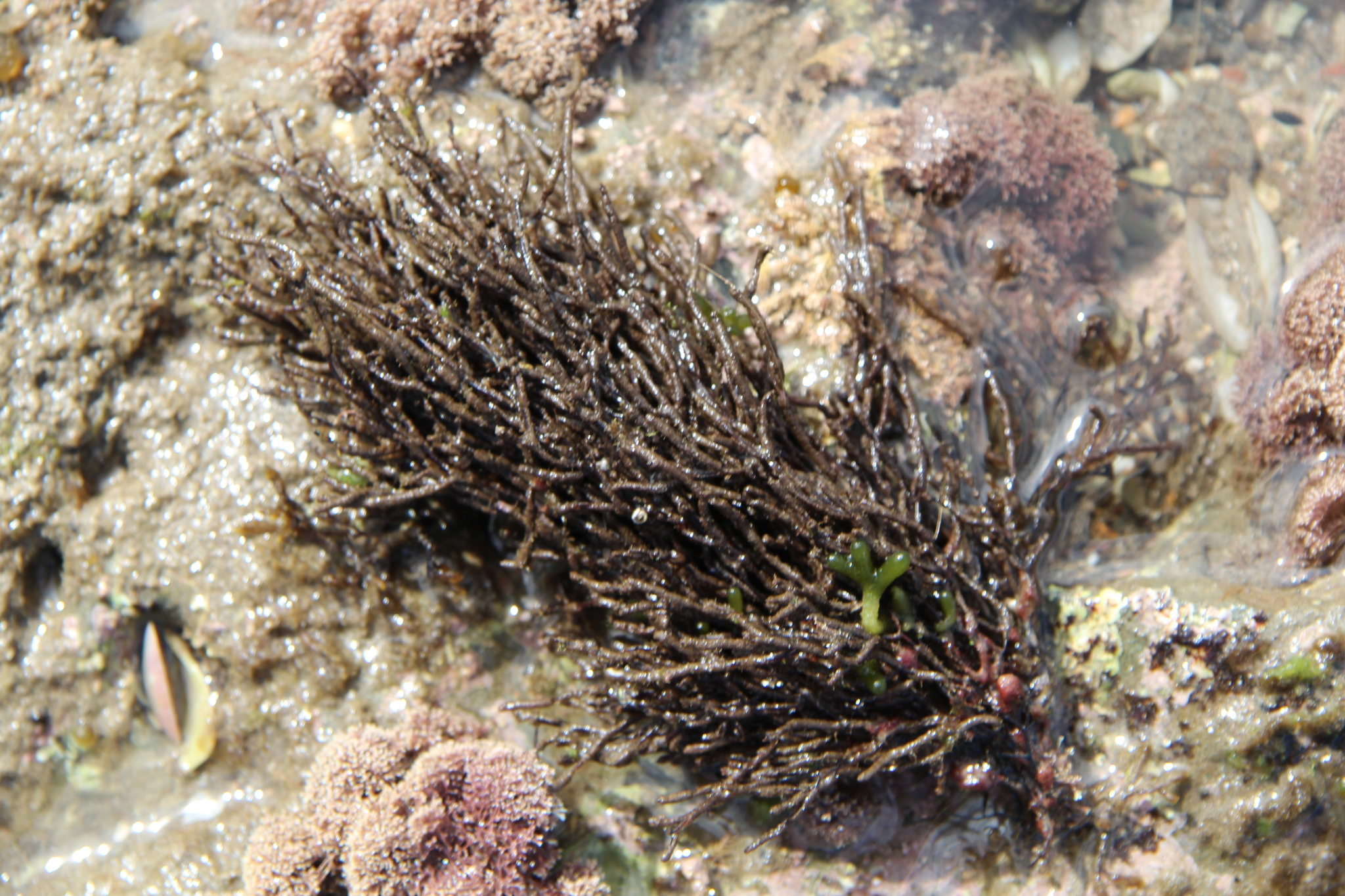

Scientific classification
- Domain: Eukaryota
- Clade: Diaphoretickes
- Clade: SAR
- Clade: Stramenopiles
- Phylum: Gyrista
- Subphylum: Ochrophytina
- Class: Phaeophyceae
- Order: Sphacelariales
- Family: Cladostephaceae
- Genus: Cladostephus
- Species: C. hirsutus

Binomial name
- Cladostephus hirsutus L. Boudouresque & M.Perret-Boudouresque ex Heesch et al. 2020

Synonyms
- List: ’’Fucus hirsutus’’Linnaeus 1767; ’’Conferva verticillata’ Lightfoot 1777; ’’Conferva myriophyllum’’Roth 1801; ’’Cladostephus verticillatus’’(Lightfoot) Lyngbye 1819; ’’Cladostephus myriophyllum’’Bory 1823; ’’Cladostephus spongiosus f. verticillatus’’(Lightfoot) Prud’homme 1972

= Cladostephus hirsutus =

Species of seaweed

Cladostephus hirsutus is a marine brown alga.

== Description ==
This is a medium-size brown alga growing to about 20 cm length. Its fronds are covered with distinct whorls of secondary branches, giving the species a hairy appearance, the source of its specific epithet “hirsutus”.

== Habitat ==
This alga occurs in the lower intertidal, tidepools and upper subtidal of rocky shores.

== Distribution ==
This species has been recorded world-wide in temperate regions, e.g. from the Mediterranean Sea, the European Atlantic coasts (including the British Isles, France, Germany, Denmark, Norway, Spain, and Portugal), the Atlantic shores of the United States, the Pacific shores of Mexico, Australia, and New Zealand.
