= Agarum =

Agarum may refer to:

- Agarum (genus), a genus of kelp in the Agaraceae family
- Agarum (toponym), a Bronze-Age Near Eastern regional name
