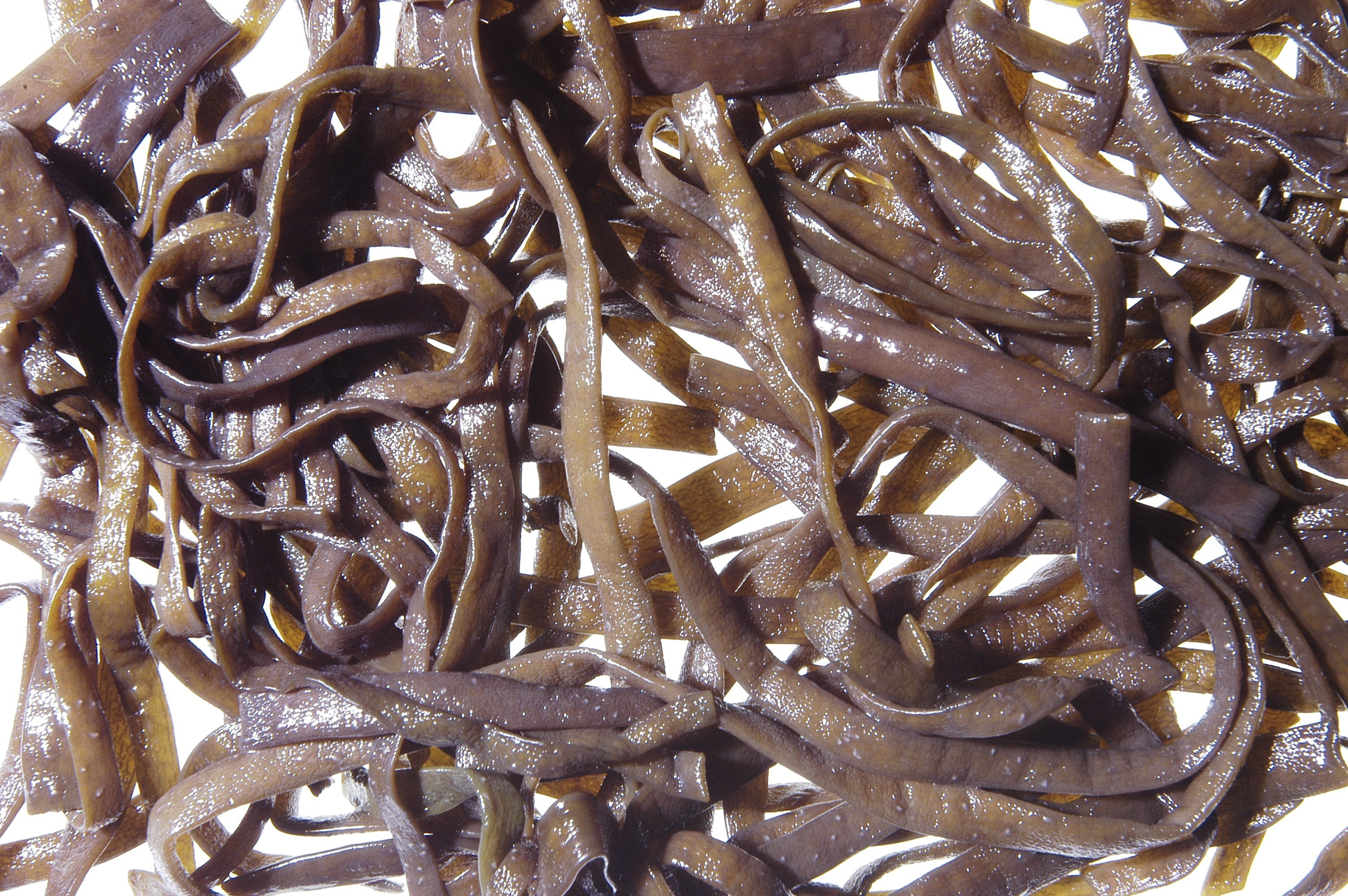

Scientific classification
- Domain: Eukaryota
- Clade: Sar
- Clade: Stramenopiles
- Division: Ochrophyta
- Class: Phaeophyceae
- Order: Fucales
- Family: Himanthaliaceae
- Genus: Himanthalia
- Species: H. elongata

Binomial name
- Himanthalia elongata (Linnaeus) S.F. Gray

Synonyms
- Fucus elongatus Linnaeus, 1753; Fucus loreus Linnaeus, 1767; Fucus pruniformis Gunnerus, 1772; Fucus tomentosus Hudson, 1778; Funicularius tuberculatus Roussel, 1806; Himanthalia lorea (Linnaeus) Lyngbye, 1819

= Himanthalia elongata =

Species of seaweed

Himanthalia elongata is a brown alga in the order Fucales, also known by the common names thongweed, sea thong and sea spaghetti. It is found in the north east Atlantic Ocean and the North Sea.

According to the World Register of Marine Species Himanthalia elongata is the only member of its genus, Himanthalia Lyngbye, 1819 and the only member of its family, Himanthaliaceae (Kjellman) De Toni, 1891.

== Description ==
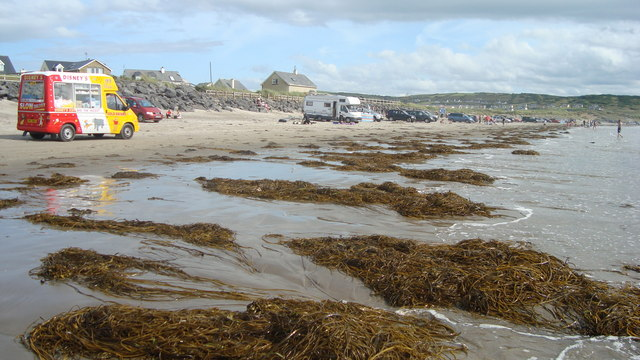
Thongweed at Rossnowlagh, Ireland.

Himanthalia elongata is a common brown alga of the lower shore. The thallus is at first a small flattened or saucer-shaped disc up to three centimetres wide with a short stalk. In the autumn or winter, long thongs grows from the centre of this, branching dichotomously a number of times. They grow fast and can reach up to two metres by the following summer when they become mature. They bear the conceptacles, the reproductive organs, and begin to decay when the gametes have been released into the water. The discs live for two or three years.

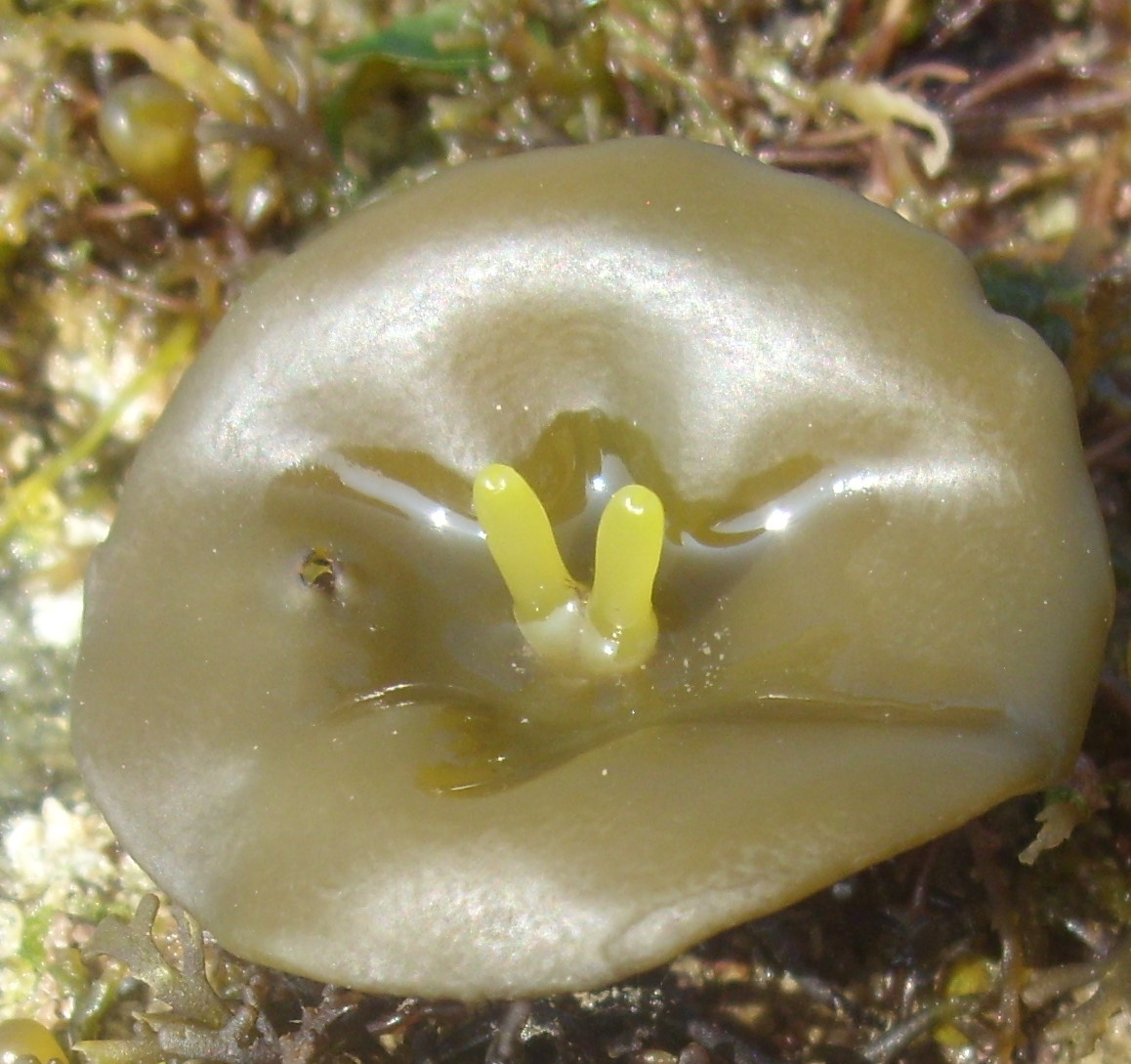
Young thallus of Himanthalia elongata

== Distribution and habitat ==
Himanthalia elongata is found in the Baltic Sea, the North Sea and the north east Atlantic Ocean from Scandinavia, through Ireland, and south to Portugal. It is found on gently shelving rocky shores in the lower littoral zone and the sublittoral zone particularly on shores with moderate wave exposure. It is sometimes abundant and forms a distinct zone just below the Fucus serratus zone.
