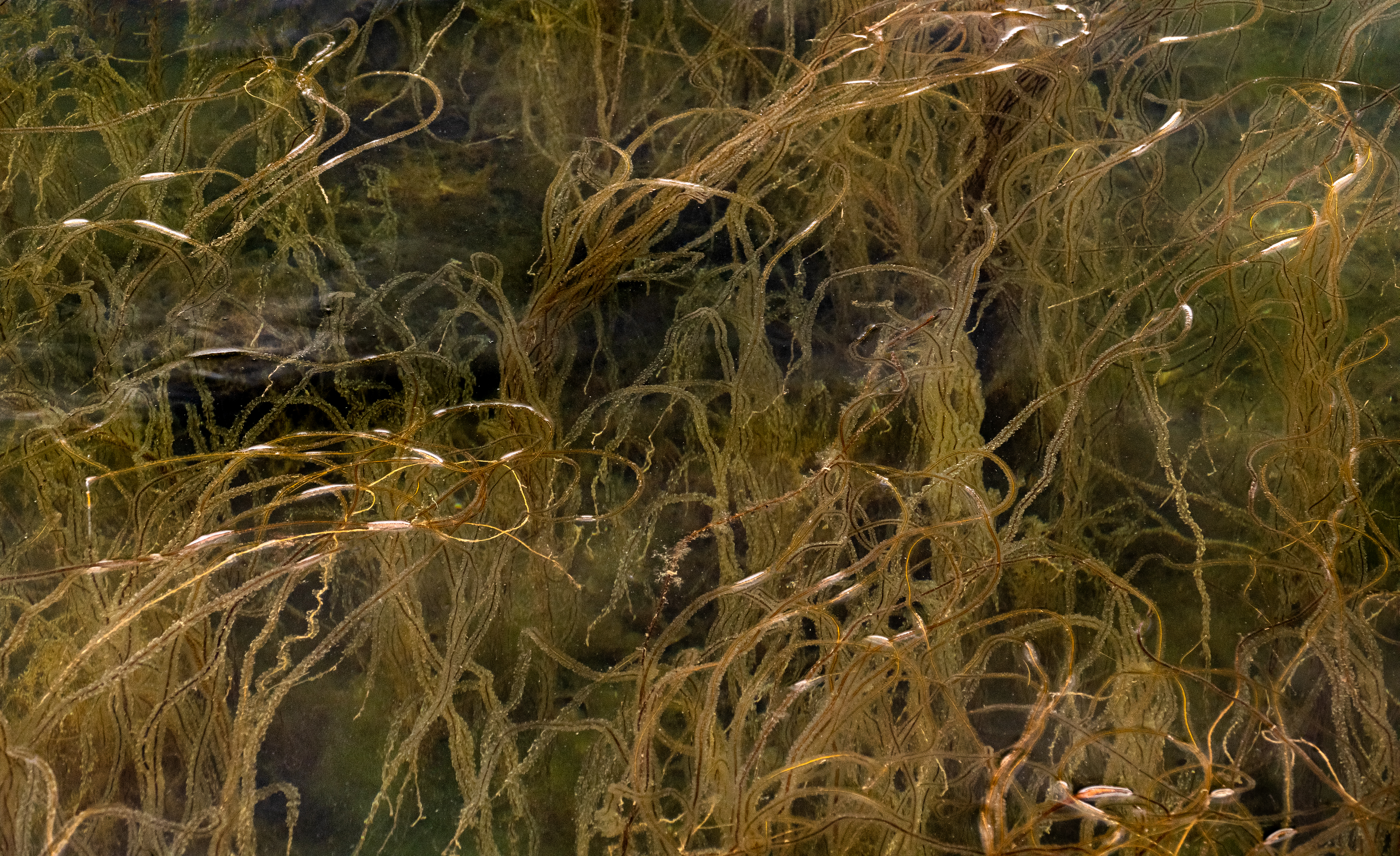
- Chorda filum in Brofjorden, Sweden

Scientific classification
- Domain: Eukaryota
- Clade: Sar
- Clade: Stramenopiles
- Division: Ochrophyta
- Class: Phaeophyceae
- Order: Laminariales
- Family: Chordaceae
- Genus: Chorda
- Species: C. filum

Binomial name
- Chorda filum (L.) Stackhouse, 1797

Synonyms
- Fucus filum L. 1753; Ceramium filum (L.) F.H.Wiggers 1780; Chordaria filum (L.) C.Agardh 1817; Scytosiphon filum (L.) C.Agardh 1820; Chondrus filum (L.) J.V.Lamouroux 1824; Chorda filum var. thrix W.J.Hooker; Fucus filiformis Strøm 1762; Chorda filum var. subtomentosa Areschoug 1875; Chorda filum f. subtomentosa (Areschoug) Kjellman 1883

= Chorda filum =

Species of brown algae

Chorda filum, commonly known as dead man's rope or sea lace among other names, is a species of brown algae in the genus Chorda. It is widespread in the temperate waters of the northern hemisphere. The species has numerous other common names related to its physical appearance. These include mermaid's tresses, cat's gut or sea-catgut, bootlace weed, sea-twine, and mermaid's fishing line.

Cultivation

In the spring of 2025, a groundbreaking breakthrough was made in the cultivation of this type of seaweed: for the first time, it was successfully grown using spore propagation. The work, carried out by the Danish company Dansk Tang, marks a historic step forward in enabling seaweed farming in environments with lower salinity than previously thought possible.

== Description ==
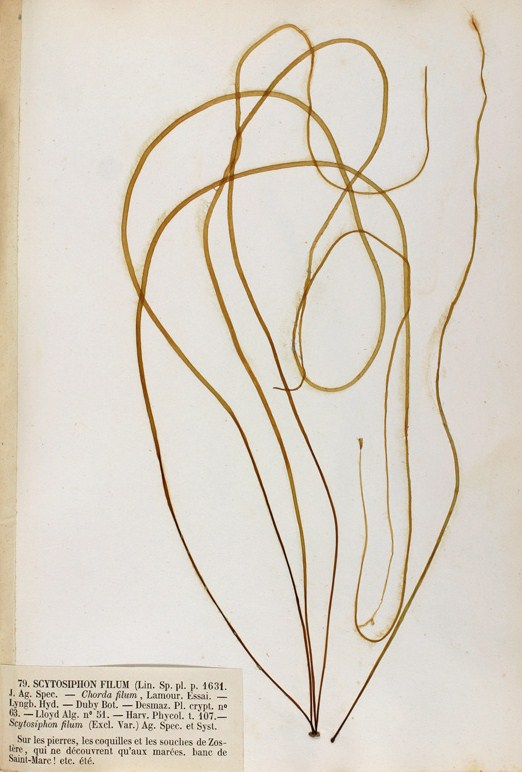
Chorda filum

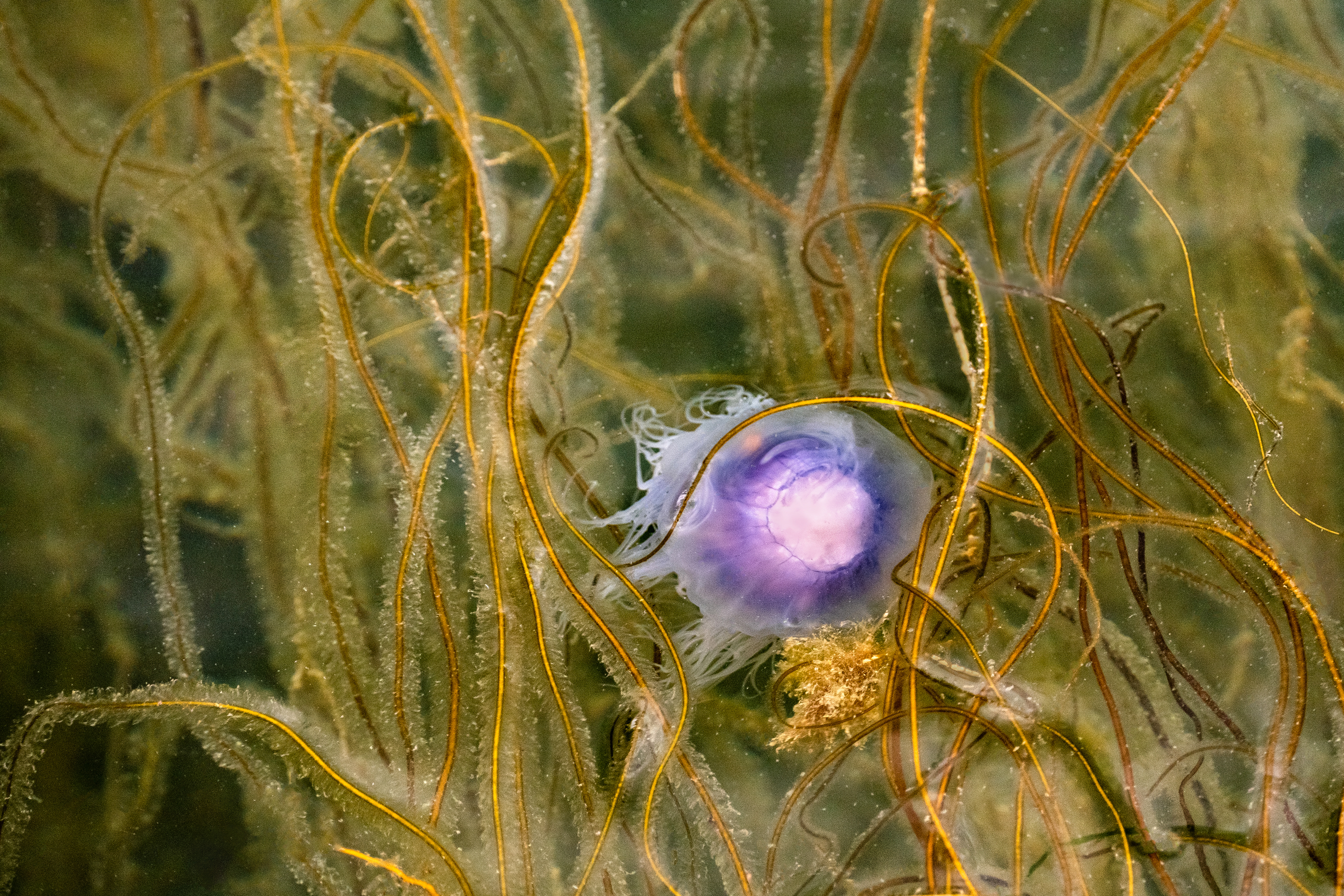
Chorda filum with short hairs in summer; a blue jellyfish swimming among them.

Chorda filum have typically long, unbranched and hollow rope-like brown fronds about 5 mm (0.20 in) in diameter but can reach to lengths of 8 m (26 ft). The holdfast is disc-shaped. C. filum is found in sheltered marine and estuarine bodies of water at depths of up to 5 m (16 ft). They are usually anchored to loose substrates like gravel and pebbles or other macroalgae and eelgrass. C. filum grow at an average of 17 cm (6.7 in) per month, with the spiral-shaped, often gas-inflated, termini of fronds being dead, but receiving replacement by growth from a sub-terminal meristem. They are annuals, and die during winter. The fronds bear short colorless hairs in summer.

Chorda filum is similar to Halosiphon tomentosus. However H. tomentosus is less common and is covered with long brown paraphyses or sterile hairs.

== Habitat ==
Chorda filum is to be found in very sheltered shores. It may be common or abundant near low water and in the sublittoral to 25 m (82 ft) areas in mud and sand.

== Distribution ==
Chorda filum is found in temperate waters in the northern hemisphere, on the coasts of the northern Atlantic and Pacific oceans. Within this, it is noted as being widespread and generally common around Ireland, Great Britain, the Shetland Isles, and the Isle of Man.
