= Mermaid's hair =

Mermaid's hair can refer to different genera of seaweed:

- Cladophora
- Desmarestia

== See also ==
- Chorda filum, also known as 'mermaid tresses'
- Mermaid
