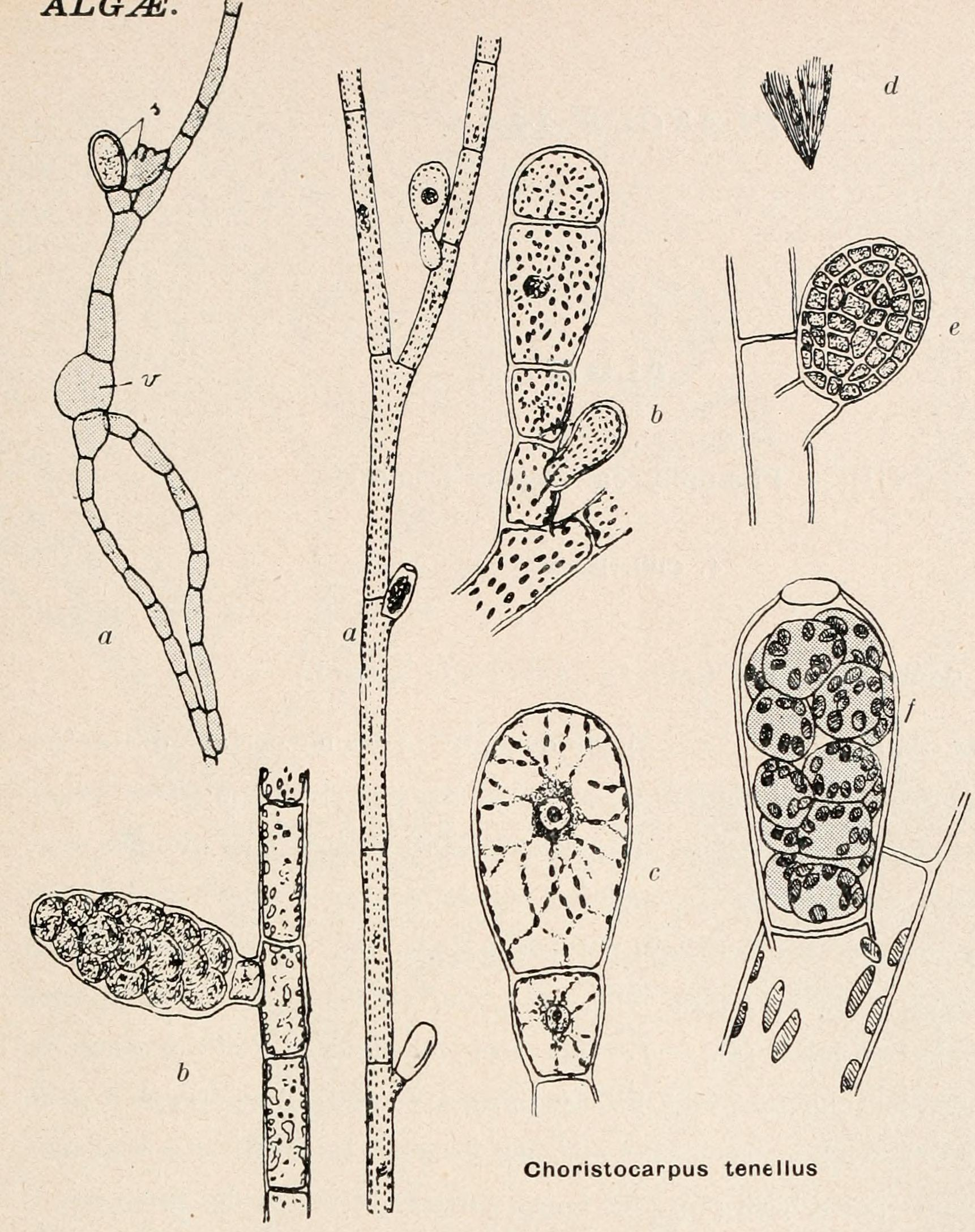
- Illustration of Choristocarpus tenellus

Scientific classification
- Domain: Eukaryota
- Supergroup: Stramenopiles
- Division: Ochrophyta
- Class: Phaeophyceae
- Order: Discosporangiales
- Family: Choristocarpaceae; Kjellman
- Genus: Choristocarpus; Zanardini, 1860
- Species: C. tenellus

Binomial name
- Choristocarpus tenellus Zanardini, 1860

= Choristocarpus =

Genus of algae

Choristocarpus is a genus of brown algae in the order Discosporangiales containing one species, Choristocarpus tenellus. It is the only genus in the family Choristocarpaceae. The species is mostly located in the cold waters of the Northern hemisphere. A type of seaweed, Choristocarpus attaches itself to rocky substrate in places that are near continental shelves and the shore. Due to the species having morphological similarity, they were classified in closer relation with D. mesarthrocarpum. But due to many other differing characteristics Choristocarpus were put into their own family with a single genus and a single species of brown algae.

== Description ==
Choristocarpus tenellus is a small marine brown alga that grows as lightly pigmented, irregularly branched epiphytic filaments roughly 1–2 cm tall. The color of the species does not vary much, depicting a brown or clear color in most situations. The cells of Choristocarpus are strictly uniseriate, meaning that they are arranged in a single row or layer in the brown algae which is different from other brown algae which are multiseriate. Its cells contain discoid chloroplasts lacking pyrenoids, and show a negative chemical reaction to eau de Javel (hypochlorite bleach) during microscopic examination.

== Distribution ==
They are found from 10-70m depths in the Mediterranean (Adriatic, Gulf of Naples, Corsica) and England. Choristocarpus are a relatively rare and unique species of brown algae that do not have many records of occurrence in the world.

== Habitat and biology ==
C. tenellus is a sublittoral, photosynthetic brown alga growing epiphytically on macroalgae, reproducing via asexual propagules and sporangia/zoidangia within an isomorphic life cycle.

== Taxonomy ==
Because they possessed uniseriate filamentous thalli with apical growth cells, Choristocarpus were originally put in the same family as Discosporangiales. Due to factors such as their different vegetative filaments, Discosporangiales were entered into their own unique family and genus. Others have argued that Discosporangiales should be classified into the order Sphacelariales. Further DNA analysis dissuaded that theory from taking hold. It showed that Choristocarpus represent a separate lineage and are only distantly related to Sphacelariales. When doing a phylogenetic tree analysis it was further found that Choristocarpus should be placed in their own lineage separate from other brown algae. As a species, Choristocarpus may have evolved more recently in evolutionary history than their brown algae relatives, resulting in their taxonomic status.
