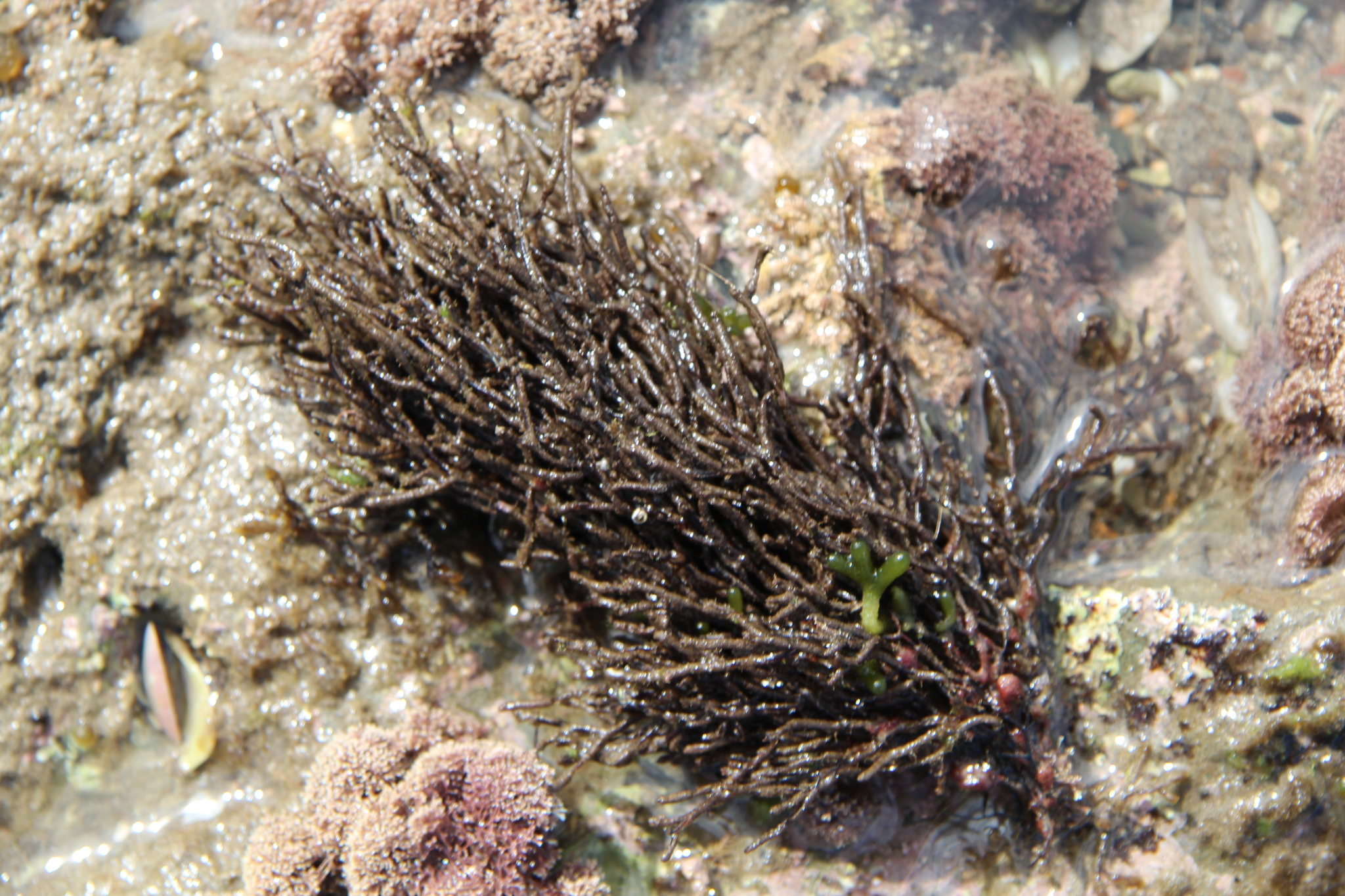
- Cladostephus hirsutus

Scientific classification
- Domain: Eukaryota
- Clade: Diaphoretickes
- Clade: SAR
- Clade: Stramenopiles
- Phylum: Gyrista
- Subphylum: Ochrophytina
- Class: Phaeophyceae
- Order: Sphacelariales
- Family: Cladostephaceae
- Genus: Cladostephus; C. Agardh, 1817

Species
- Cladostephus antarcticus Kützing, 1856; Cladostephus hariotii Sauvageau, 1914; Cladostephus spongiosus (Hudson) C.Agardh, 1817; Cladostephus hirsutus L. Boudouresque & M.Perret-Boudouresque ex Heesch et al. 2020

= Cladostephus =

Genus of seaweed

Cladostephus is a genus of marine brown alga.
