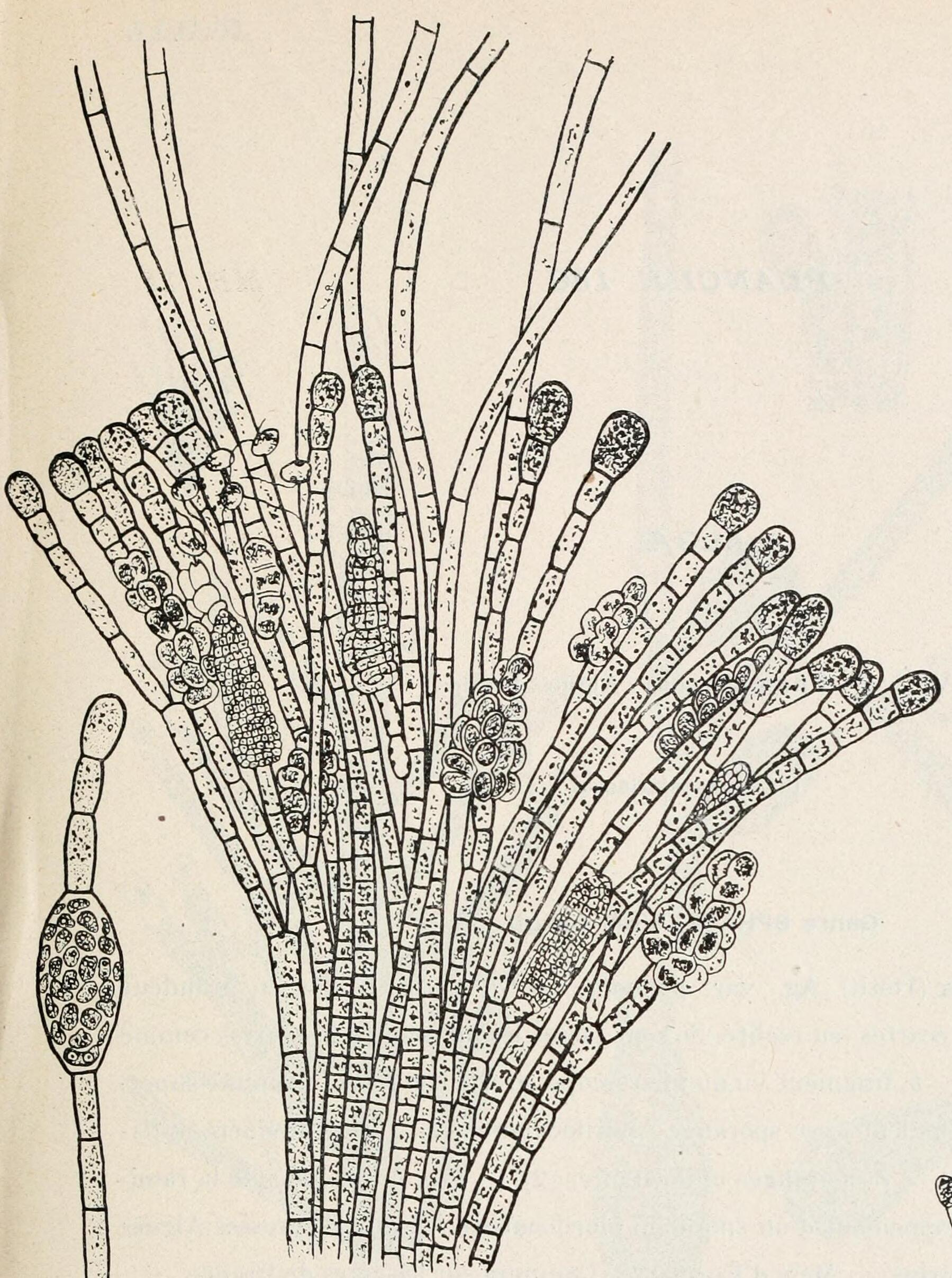

Scientific classification
- Domain: Eukaryota
- Clade: Sar
- Clade: Stramenopiles
- Division: Ochrophyta
- Class: Phaeophyceae
- Subclass: Fucophycidae
- Order: Nemodermatales; M. Parente, R.L. Fletcher, F. Rousseau & N. Phillips
- Family: Nemodermataceae; Feldmann
- Genus: Nemoderma; Schousboe ex Bornet, 1892
- Species: N. tingitanum

Binomial name
- Nemoderma tingitanum Schousboe ex Bornet, 1892

= Nemoderma =

Genus of algae

Nemoderma is the only genus in the family Nemodermataceae and order Nemodermatales of the brown algae (class Phaeophyceae). The genus contains only a single species, Nemoderma tingitanum.
