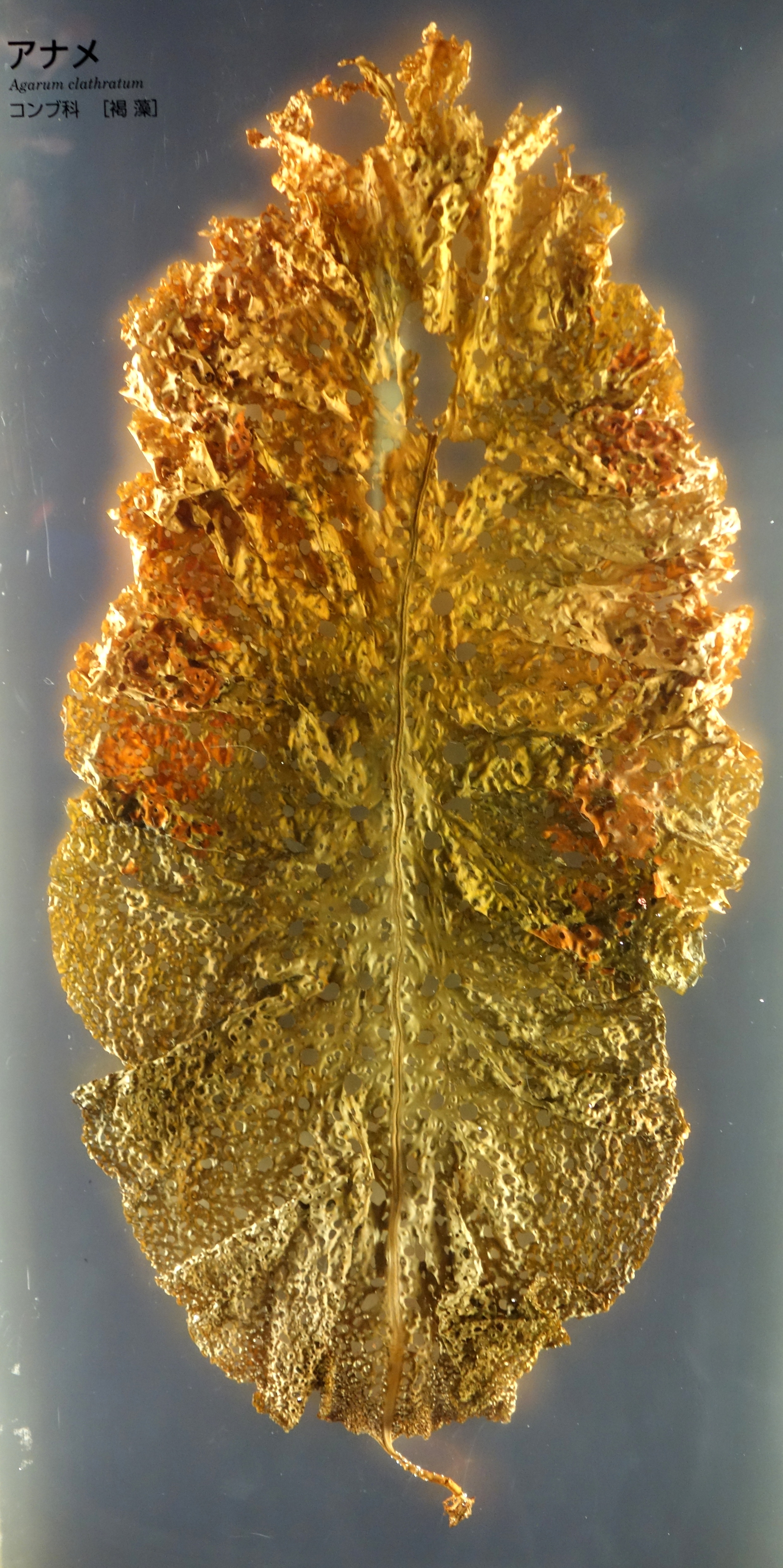
- Agarum clathratum exhibit at the National Museum of Nature and Science, Tokyo

Scientific classification
- Domain: Eukaryota
- Clade: Sar
- Clade: Stramenopiles
- Phylum: Ochrophyta
- Class: Phaeophyceae
- Order: Laminariales
- Family: Agaraceae
- Genus: Agarum; Dumortier 1822

Species
- Agarum clathratum; Agarum turneri

= Agarum (genus) =

Genus of kelp

Agarum is a genus of kelp described by Barthélemy Dumortier in 1822. It has a broad distribution through the northern portions of the Atlantic and Pacific oceans.

In 1840, Agarum was placed in the family Agaraceae (initially spelt Agaroideae), named after this genus. Due to its paraphyletic status, some species have been separated into two genera, Neoagarum and Thalassiophyllum, classified in the same family.
