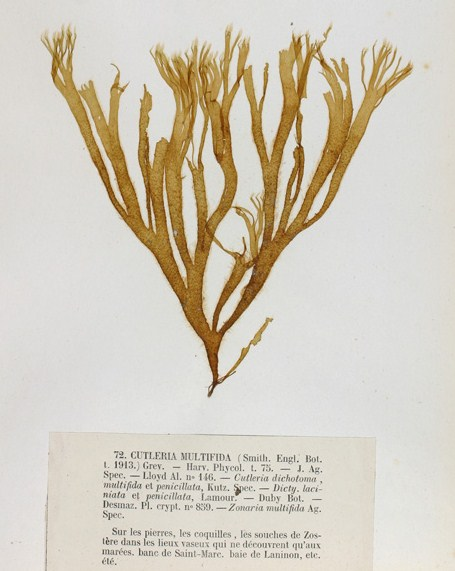
- Cutleria multifida

Scientific classification
- Domain: Eukaryota
- Clade: Diaphoretickes
- Clade: SAR
- Clade: Stramenopiles
- Phylum: Gyrista
- Subphylum: Ochrophytina
- Class: Phaeophyceae
- Subclass: Fucophycidae
- Order: Tilopteridales; Bessey 1907

Families
- Cutleriaceae; Halosiphonaceae; Phyllariaceae; Stschapoviaceae; Tilopteridaceae

Synonyms
- Cutleriales Bessey

= Tilopteridales =

Order of algae

Tilopteridales is an order of brown algae (class Phaeophyceae).

This order contains algae with different types of alternation of generation. For instance, Saccorhiza polyschides has a sporophyte with a kelp-like morphology while the gametophyte is filamentous, Cutleria multifida has a more complex dichotomously branching gametophyte and a crustose sporophyte, Zanardinia typus has an isomorphic alternation of generations, and Tilopteris mertensii only has a diploid phase.
