= Onslowiaceae =

Scientific classification
- Domain: Eukaryota
- Clade: Sar
- Clade: Stramenopiles
- Division: Ochrophyta
- Class: Phaeophyceae
- Subclass: Dictyotophycidae
- Order: Onslowiales; Draisma & Prud'homme van Reine in Phillips et al.
- Family: Onslowiaceae; Draisma & Prud'homme van Reine

Genera
- Onslowia; Verosphacela

Family of algae

Onslowiaceae is the only family in order Onslowiales in the brown algae (class Phaeophyceae). The family contains only the genera Onslowia and Verosphacela.
