= Ascoseira =

Scientific classification
- Domain: Eukaryota
- Clade: Diaphoretickes
- Clade: SAR
- Clade: Stramenopiles
- Phylum: Gyrista
- Subphylum: Ochrophytina
- Class: Phaeophyceae
- Subclass: Fucophycidae
- Order: Ascoseirales; Petrov
- Family: Ascoseiraceae; Skottsberg
- Genus: Ascoseira; Skottsberg
- Species: A. mirabilis

Binomial name
- Ascoseira mirabilis Skottsberg

Genus of seaweeds

Ascoseira is a monotypic genus of seaweed in the brown algae (class Phaeophyceae). The single and type species, Ascoseira mirabilis Skottsberg, is a large parenchymatous macroalgae, and is endemic to the Antarctic Ocean. Ascoseira is assigned to its own order. The alga grows in subtidal waters at depths of from 3 to 15 meters.
