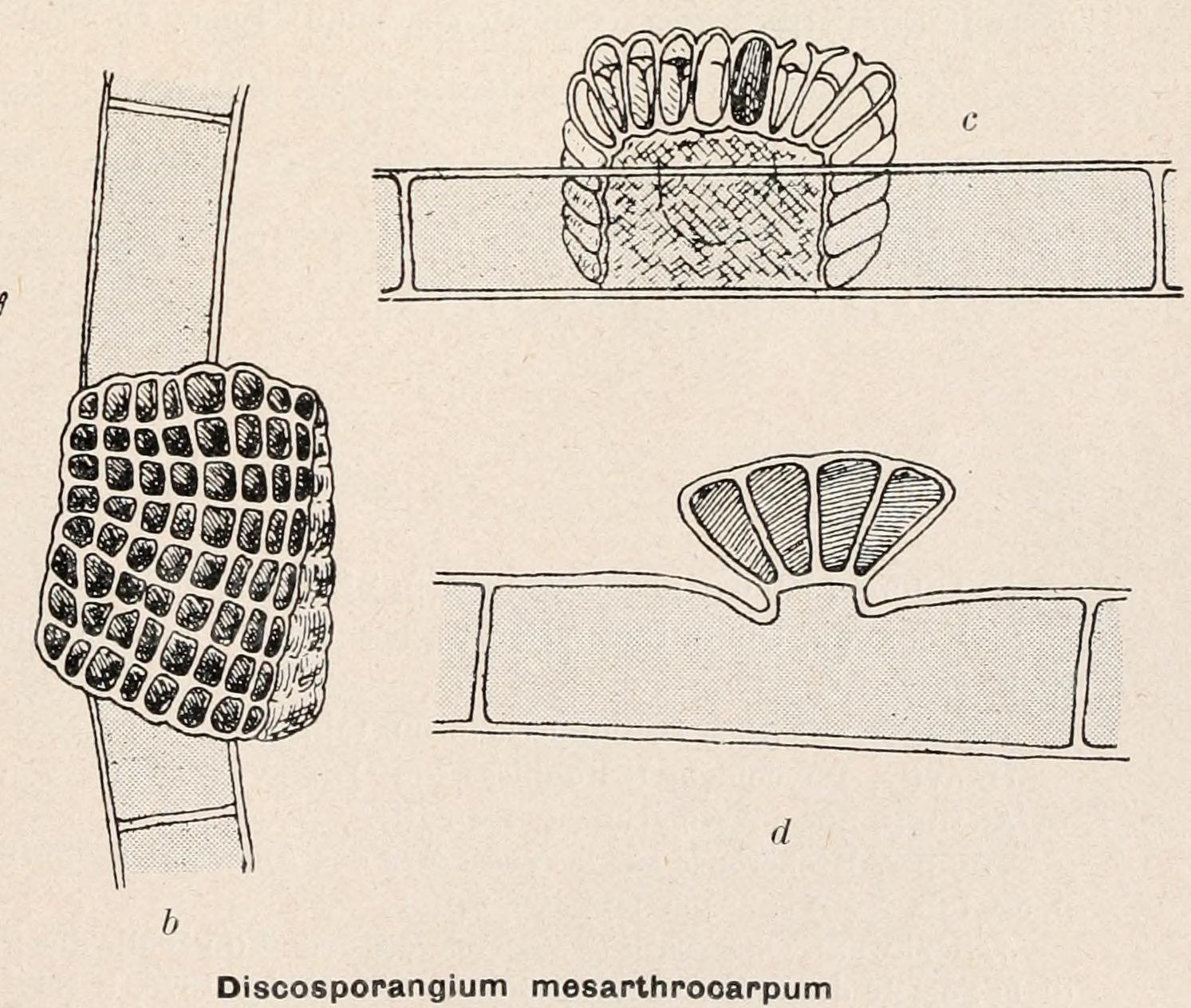
- Discosporangium mesarthrocarpum

Scientific classification
- Domain: Eukaryota
- Clade: Diaphoretickes
- Clade: SAR
- Clade: Stramenopiles
- Phylum: Gyrista
- Subphylum: Ochrophytina
- Class: Phaeophyceae
- Subclass: Discosporangiophycidae; Silberfeld, Rousseau & Reviers 2014
- Order: Discosporangiales; Schmidt 1937 emend. Kawai et al. 2007

Families
- Choristocarpaceae; Discosporangiaceae

= Discosporangiales =

Order of algae

Discosporangiales is an order of brown algae. It includes two families, Choristocarpaceae and Discosporangiaceae.
