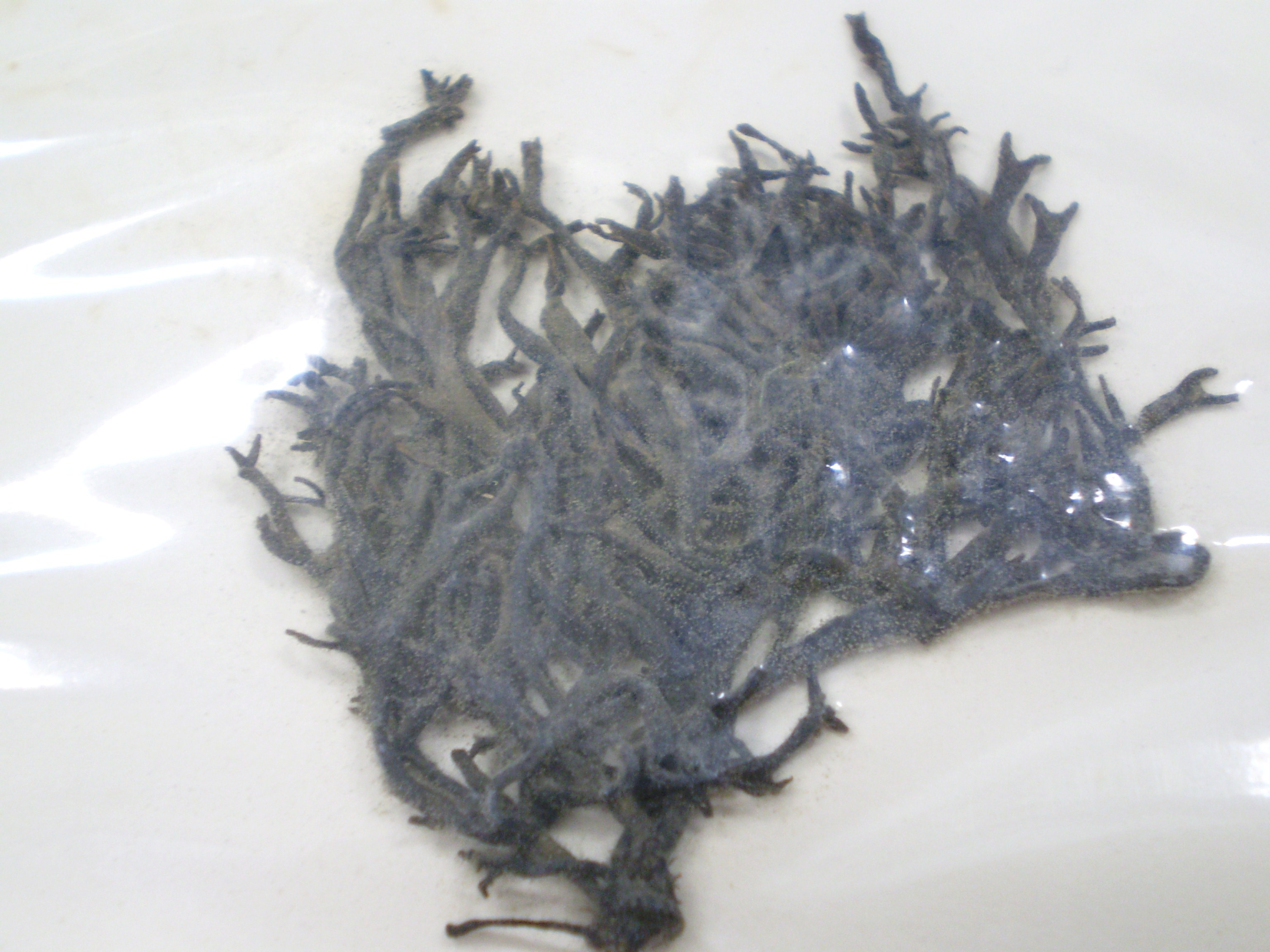
- Ishige okamurae

Scientific classification
- Domain: Eukaryota
- Clade: Sar
- Clade: Stramenopiles
- Division: Ochrophyta
- Class: Phaeophyceae
- Order: Ishigeales
- Family: Ishigeaceae; Okamura
- Genus: Ishige; Yendo

Species
- Ishige foliacea Ishige okamurae Ishige sinicola

= Ishige (alga) =

Genus of algae

Ishige is a genus of brown algae (class Phaeophyceae) occurring in the warm temperate regions of the western Pacific Ocean. It is the only genus in the family Ishigeaceae.
