= Pseudochorda =

Scientific classification
- Domain: Eukaryota
- Clade: Diaphoretickes
- Clade: SAR
- Clade: Stramenopiles
- Phylum: Gyrista
- Subphylum: Ochrophytina
- Class: Phaeophyceae
- Order: Laminariales
- Family: Pseudochordaceae; Kawai & Kurogi, 1985
- Genus: Pseudochorda; Yamada, Tokida & Inagaki in Inagaki, 1958

Species
- Pseudochorda gracilis Pseudochorda nagaii

Genus of seaweeds

Pseudochorda is a genus of thalloid brown algae including two species.
