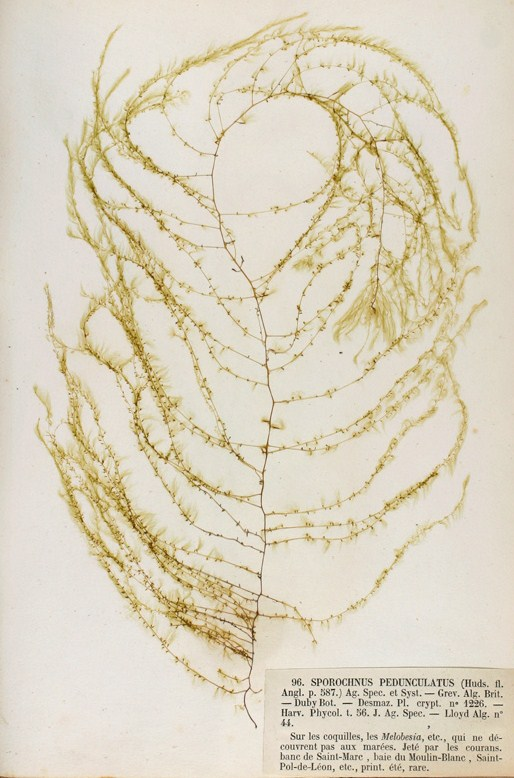
- Sporochnus pedunculatus

Scientific classification
- Domain: Eukaryota
- Clade: Sar
- Clade: Stramenopiles
- Division: Ochrophyta
- Class: Phaeophyceae
- Subclass: Fucophycidae
- Order: Sporochnales; Sauvageau
- Family: Sporochnaceae; Greville

Genera
- Austronereia; Bellotia; Carpomitra; Chytraphora; Encyothalia; Lucasia; Nereia; Perisporochnus; Perithalia; Sporochnema; Sporochnus; Tomaculopsis

= Sporochnaceae =

Family of algae

Sporochnacaeae is the only family in the order Sporochnales in the brown algae (class Phaeophyceae). Member of this family are thread-like algae growing by means of an intercalary row of dome shaped cells at the base of the hairs.
