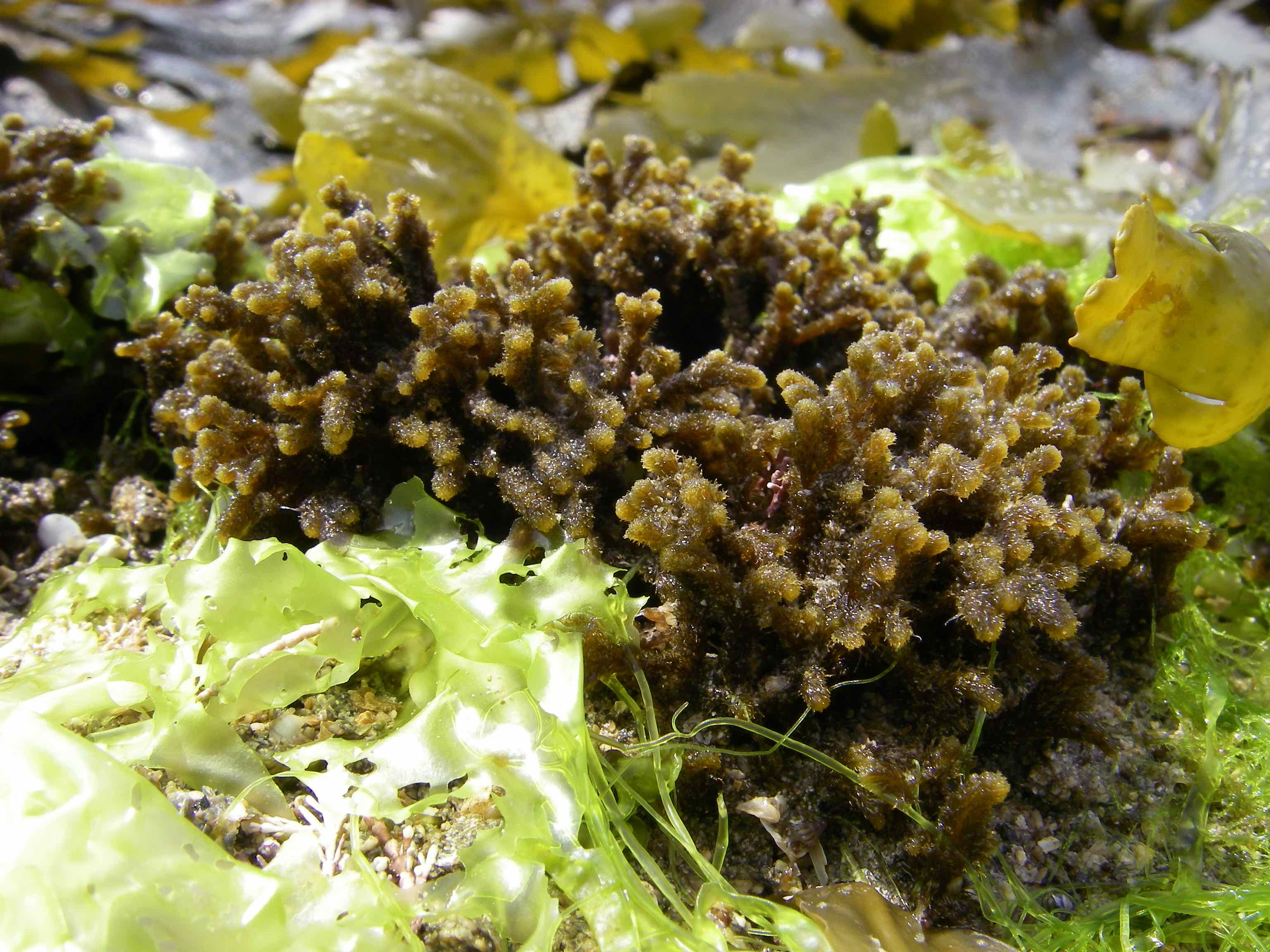
- Cladostephus spongiosus growing in the intertidal of a rocky shore along the Irish west coast.

Scientific classification
- Domain: Eukaryota
- Clade: Diaphoretickes
- Clade: SAR
- Clade: Stramenopiles
- Phylum: Gyrista
- Subphylum: Ochrophytina
- Class: Phaeophyceae
- Order: Sphacelariales
- Family: Cladostephaceae; Oltmanns, 1922

= Cladostephaceae =

Family of algae

Cladostephaceae is a family of brown algae belonging to the order Sphacelariales in the class Phaeophyceae.

The family comprises a single genus:

- Cladostephus C.Agardh, 1817
