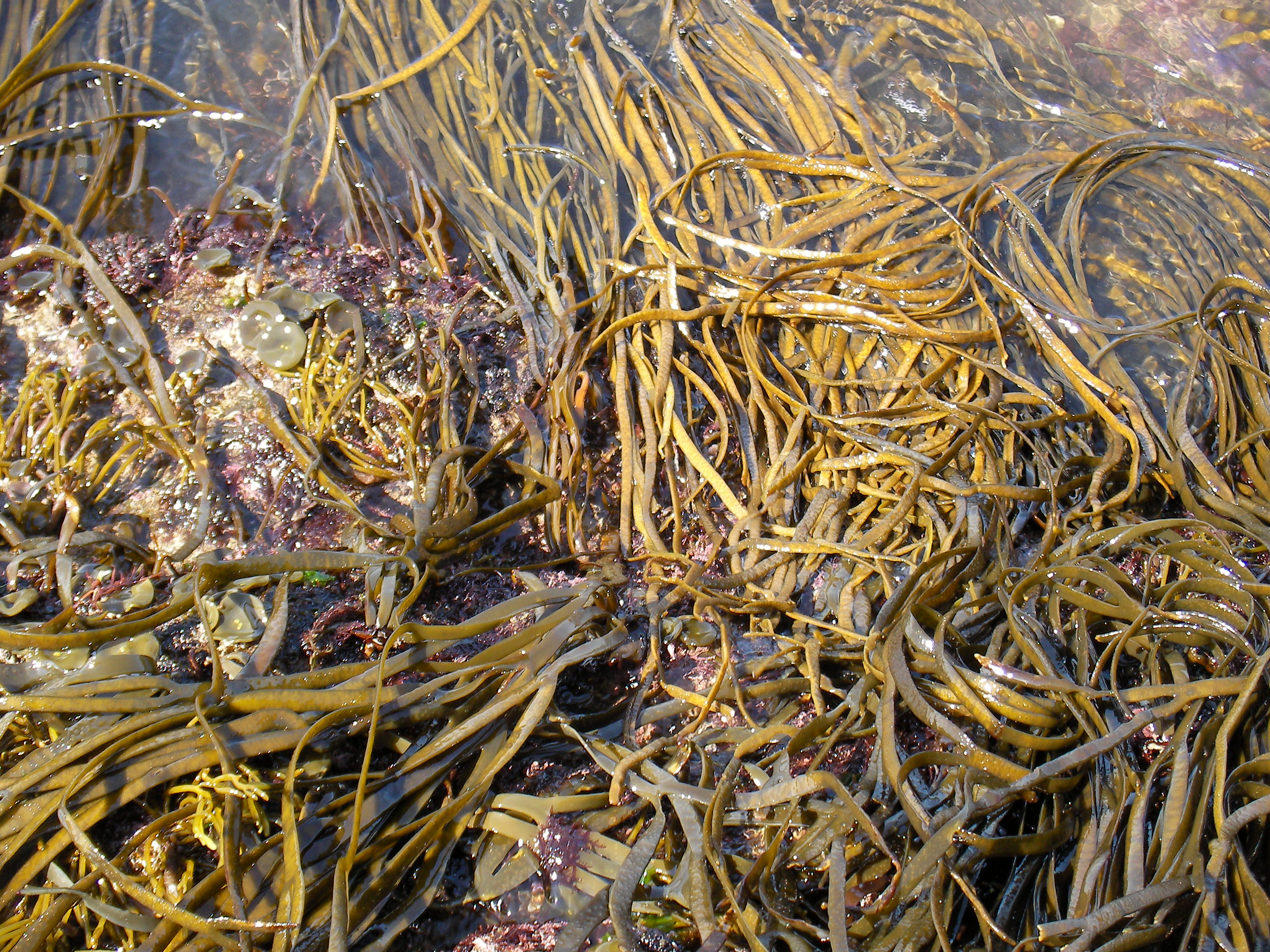
- Himanthalia elongata

Scientific classification
- Domain: Eukaryota
- Clade: Sar
- Clade: Stramenopiles
- Division: Ochrophyta
- Class: Phaeophyceae
- Order: Fucales
- Family: Himanthaliaceae (Kjellman) De Toni
- Genus: Himanthalia; Lyngbye

Species
- Himanthalia durvillei; Himanthalia elongata

= Himanthalia =

Genus of seaweeds

Himanthalia is a genus of brown algae. It is the only genus in the family Himanthaliaceae in the order Fucales. It includes two species: Himanthalia durvillei and Himanthalia elongata.

== Common names ==
Himanthalia are used for human consumption; they are marketed in France under the names "Sea beans" or "Sea spaghetti".
