= Aureophycus =

Scientific classification
- Domain: Eukaryota
- Clade: Sar
- Clade: Stramenopiles
- Division: Ochrophyta
- Class: Phaeophyceae
- Order: Laminariales
- Family: Aureophycaceae; H. Kawai & L.M. Ridgway, 2013
- Genus: Aureophycus; H. Kawai, T. Hanyuda, M. Lindeberg & S.C. Lindstrom, 2008
- Species: A. aleuticus

Binomial name
- Aureophycus aleuticus H. Kawai, T. Hanyuda, M. Lindeberg & S.C. Lindstrom, 2008

Genus of algae

Aureophycus is a genus of kelp native to the waters of Karamil Island in the Aleutians, comprising a single species Aureophycus aleuticus, formally described in 2008. Each frond is 2 m (6 ft 7 in) long by 60 cm (24 in) wide with a strong yellow vein running along each edge (central vein lacking). A 2013 study found the genus to be basal to Laminariales.
