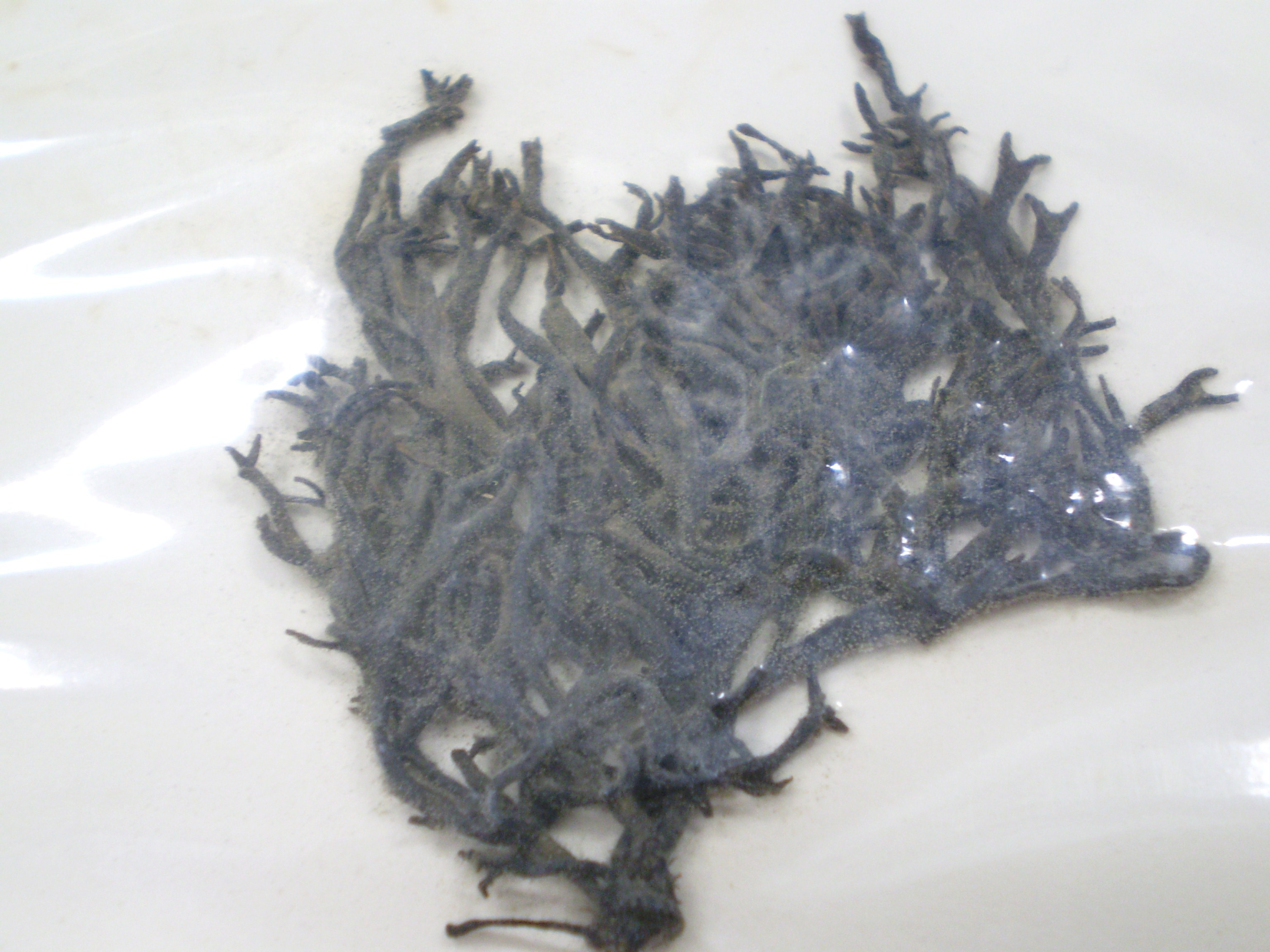

Scientific classification
- Domain: Eukaryota
- Clade: Diaphoretickes
- Clade: SAR
- Clade: Stramenopiles
- Phylum: Gyrista
- Subphylum: Ochrophytina
- Class: Phaeophyceae
- Subclass: Ishigeophycidae; Silberfeld, Rousseau & Reviers 2014
- Order: Ishigeales; Cho & Boo 2004

Families and unplaced genera
- Ishigeaceae; Petrodermataceae; Diplura

= Ishigeales =

Order of algae

Ishigeales is an order of brown algae. It includes two families, Ishigeaceae and Petrodermataceae. The genus Diplura is also included, but not placed to family.
