= Walter Migula =

German botanist (1863–1938)

Emil Friedrich August Walter
- Born: November 4, 1863
- Died: June 23, 1938 (aged 74)
- Scientific career
- Fields: Botany
- Institutions: Karlsruhe Institute of Technology

Emil Friedrich August Walter (or Walther) Migula (born 1863 in Zyrowa, Prussia (present-day Poland); died 1938 in Eisenach, Germany) was a German botanist.

In 1890, he was habilitated for botany at Karlsruhe Institute of Technology, where he spent several years as a professor. At Karlsruhe, he also worked in the bacteriology department of the Food Research Institute. He was Professor of Botany at the research academy at Eisenach.

He published many articles on the subjects of cryptogamic botany, bacteriology, and plant physiology. Between 1892 and 1933 Migula issued exsiccata series, among them Kryptogamae Germaniae, Austriae et Helvetiae exsiccatae. He is remembered for describing the bacterial genus Pseudomonas, and for publication of Kryptogamen-Flora von Deutschland, Deutsch-Österreich und der Schweiz [Cryptogamic Flora of Germany, Austria, and Switzerland], a work connected with Otto Wilhelm Thomé's Flora von Deutschland [Plants of Germany]. Other significant works by Migula include:

- Die Bakterien, 1891 [Bacteria]
- System der Bakterien. Handbuch der Morphologie, Entwicklungsgeschichte und Systematik der Bakterien, 1897–1900. (two volumes) [System for bacteria. Handbook of morphology, developmental history and systematics of bacteria]
- Pflanzenbiologie, 1900 [Plant biology]
- Morphologie, Anatomie und Physiologie der Pflanzen, 2nd edition 1906 Digital edition by the University and State Library Düsseldorf
