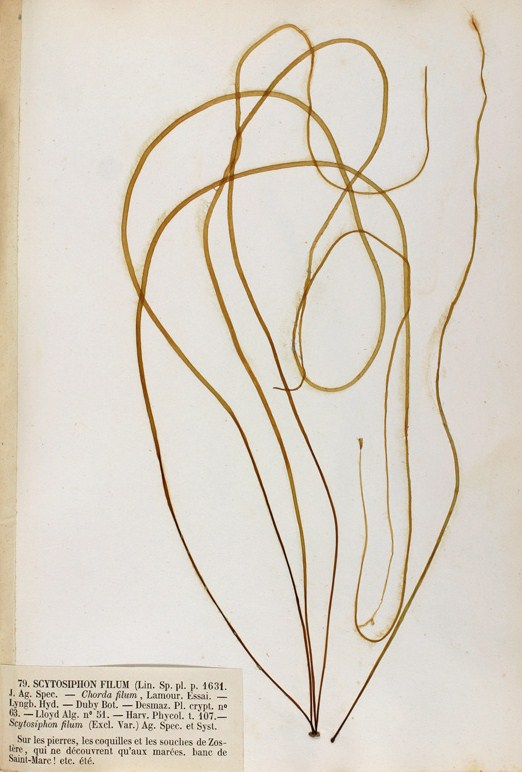

Scientific classification
- Domain: Eukaryota
- Clade: Diaphoretickes
- Clade: SAR
- Clade: Stramenopiles
- Phylum: Gyrista
- Subphylum: Ochrophytina
- Class: Phaeophyceae
- Order: Laminariales
- Family: Chordaceae; Dumortier, 1822
- Genus: Chorda; Stackhouse, 1797

Species
- Chorda filum Chorda rigida

= Chorda =

Genus of seaweeds

Chorda is a genus of thalloid brown algae. It is the only genus in the family Chordaceae. Its members are known by a number of common names including: mermaid's fishing line, tsurumo, ruálach, doruithe briain, sailors' laces, sea laces, mermaids line, roccálach, ruadhálach, gemeine meersaite, bootlace weed, seatwine, zottige meersaite, dead men's ropes, mermaid's tresses, cat gut and sea lace.

== Species ==
The known species belonging to this genus are:

- Chorda asiatica
- Chorda borealis
- Chorda filum
- Chorda kikonaiensis
- Chorda minuta
- Chorda rigida
