= Tilopteridaceae =

Scientific classification
- Domain: Eukaryota
- Clade: Diaphoretickes
- Clade: SAR
- Clade: Stramenopiles
- Phylum: Gyrista
- Subphylum: Ochrophytina
- Class: Phaeophyceae
- Order: Tilopteridales
- Family: Tilopteridaceae; Kjellman, 1890

Genera
- Haplospora; Tilopteris

Family of algae

Tilopteridaceae is a brown algae family in the order Tilopteridales.
