= Frans Reinhold Kjellman =

Swedish botanist (1846–1907)

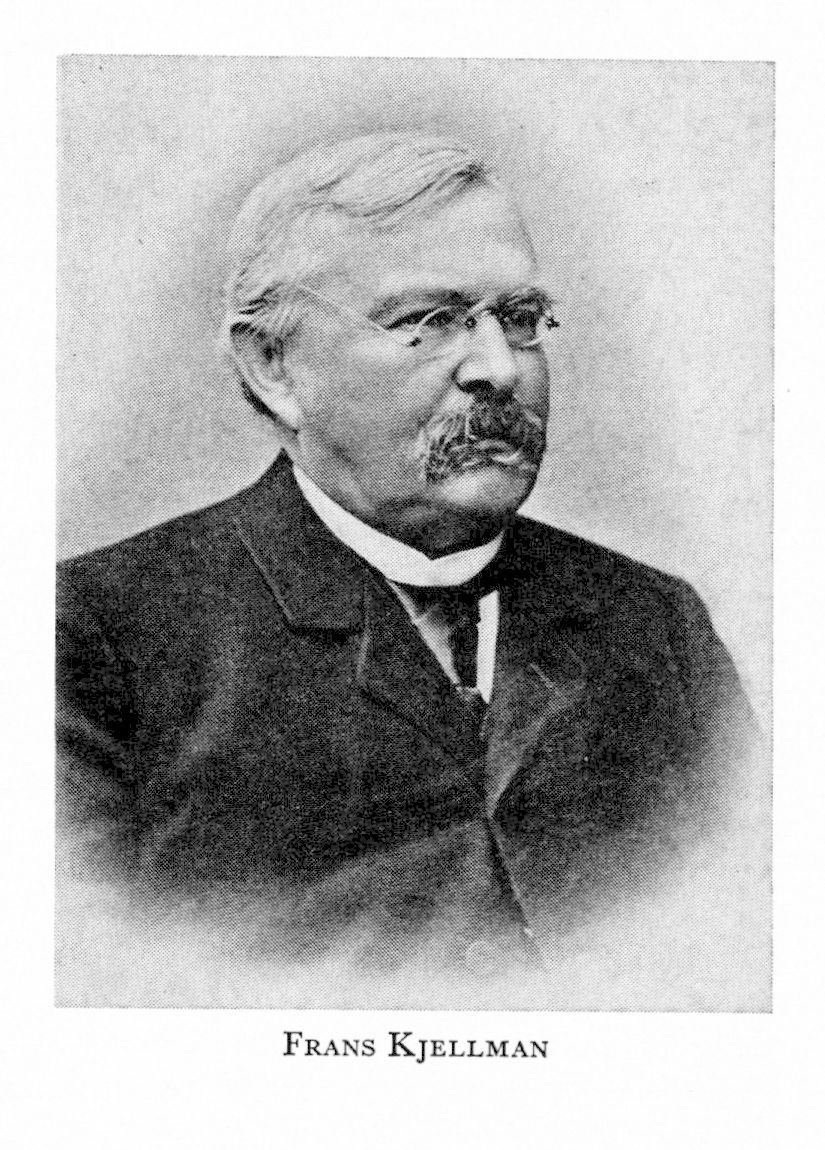
Frans Reinhold Kjellman

Frans Reinhold Kjellman (4 November 1846 – 1907) was a Swedish phycologist and Arctic explorer renowned for his pioneering surveys of marine algae, especially in polar regions. He took part in several key expeditions—most notably the Vega expedition of 1878–80—and authored foundational monographs on the algal flora of the Arctic and Bering Sea.

== Early life and education ==
Frans Reinhold Kjellman was born on 4 November 1846 on the island of Torsö, Sweden. He studied at Uppsala University, where in 1872 he completed a doctoral thesis in philosophy on Scandinavian members of the brown-algal families Ectocarpaceae and Tilopteridaceae, earning the degree of Doctor of Philosophy. Immediately thereafter he was appointed docent in botany at Uppsala. He also taught at the Fjellstedt School, founded by Peter Fjellstedt, in Uppsala 1872–1878.

== Academic career ==
In 1883, Kjellman was promoted to extraordinary professor of botany at Uppsala University. Upon the retirement of professor Theodor Magnus Fries in 1900, he succeeded him as professor of botany and practical economy, a position he held until his death in 1907.

== Explorations and research ==
Kjellman's first Arctic voyage (1872–73) was with Adolf Erik Nordenskiöld aboard the Christopher Polhem to Spitsbergen. Stranded by early winter ice in Wijdefjorden, he helped establish winter quarters at Mossel Bay (79°53′ N, 16°4′ E) and, despite temperatures falling below –20 °C and ice up to 1.5 m thick, conducted dredge collections that revealed the continuity of algal growth and reproductive activity throughout the polar night.

Between 1874 and 1876 he surveyed the west coast of Sweden, documenting zonal shifts in littoral algal communities. In 1875–76 he joined Nordenskiöld's Kara Sea expedition on the whaler Pröven, demonstrating that the Kara Sea supported a diverse marine flora akin to those of Novaya Zemlya, Spitsbergen and the Sea of Okhotsk. Kjellman collected plant specimens which were distributed in the exsiccata-like specimen series Plantae in Itineribus Suecorum Polaribus collectae [1875]. As botanist on the Vega expedition (1878–80), the first ship to sail the Northeast passage, he collected phanerogams and algae from Siberia, Alaska and St. Lawrence Island. His Bering Sea algal survey (1889) and his comprehensive Nova Ishafvets Algflora (1883) described over 259 species, many newly recorded to science.

== Scientific contributions ==
From 1880 onwards Kjellman devoted himself entirely to phycology. He authored the Handbok i Skandinaviens Hafsalgflora (1890) and contributed treatments of brown algae (Phaeophyceae) to Engler and Prantl's Die natürlichen Pflanzenfamilien (1891–93). He described numerous genera and species—including Acrosiphonia, Myelophycus and Galaxaura—and produced detailed accounts of Japanese kelps in collaboration with J. V. Petersen. His rigorous, field-based methodology modernised Swedish botanical research and teaching, advancing understanding of algal systematics, physiology and distribution.

== Legacy ==
Kjellman's extensive collections are preserved chiefly at Uppsala University, with duplicates in Leiden, Stockholm and elsewhere. In November 1906 his students honoured him with a Festschrift recognising his lifetime achievements in phycology.

== Selected publications ==
- Kjellman F. R. (1872). Bidrag till kännedomen om Skandinaviens Ectocarpaceae och Tilopteridaceae. Kongl. Sv. Vetenskapsakad. Handl. 3(7): 1–34.
- Kjellman F. R. (1883). The algae of the Arctic Sea. Kongl. Sv. Vetenskapsakad. Handl. 20(5): 1–350, pls. 1–31.
- Kjellman F. R. (1889). Om Beringhafvets algflora. Kongl. Sv. Vetenskapsakad. Handl. 23(8): 1–58.
- Kjellman F. R. (1890). Handbok i Skandinaviens Hafsalgflora. Oscar L. Lamms Förlag, Stockholm.
- Kjellman F. R. (1891–93). Phaeophyceae (Fucoideae). In: Engler & Prantl, Die natürlichen Pflanzenfamilien, I, 2(2): 176–290.

== See also ==
- Vega expedition
