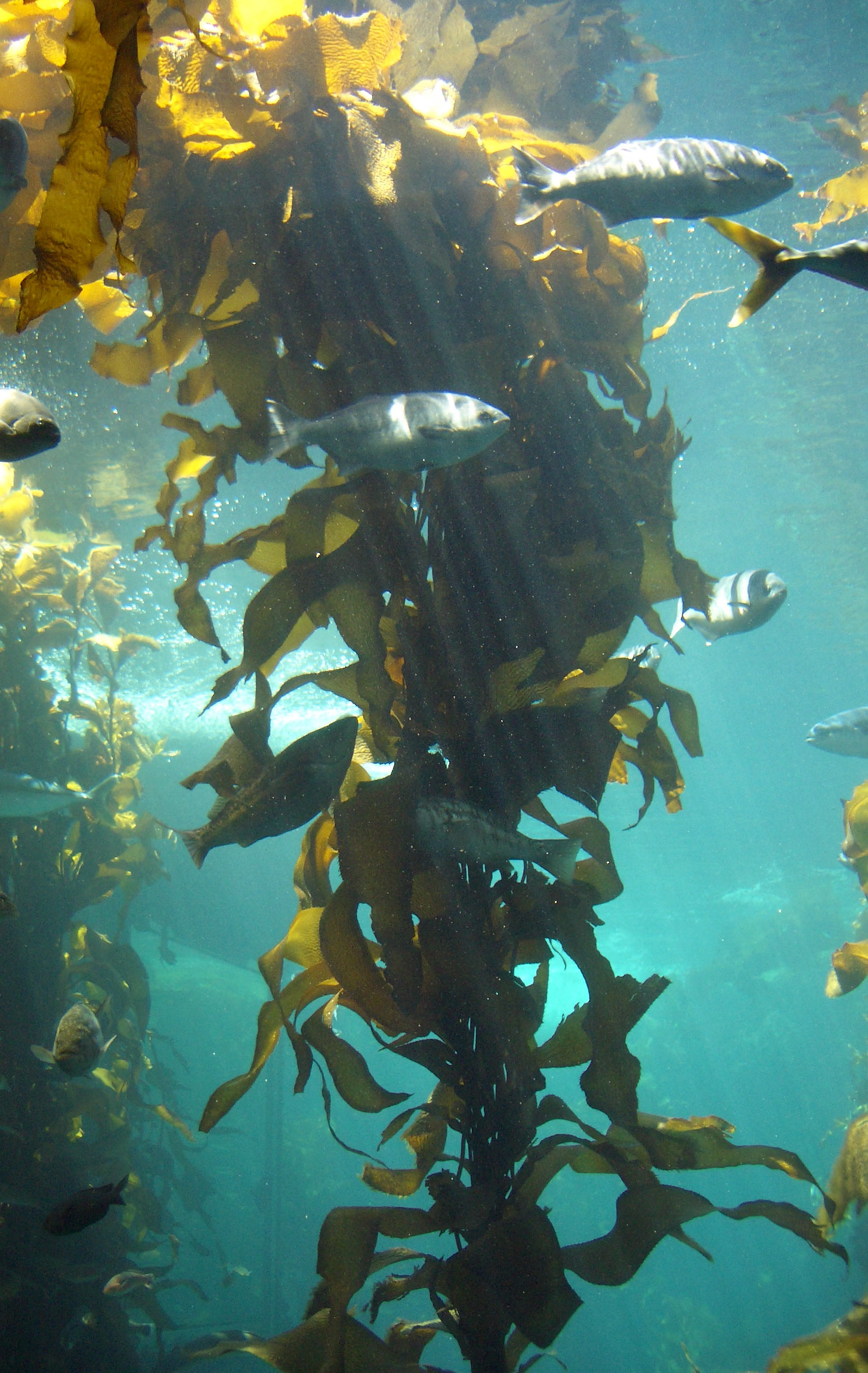
- Giant kelp (Macrocystis pyrifera)

Scientific classification
- Domain: Eukaryota
- Supergroup: Stramenopiles
- Division: Ochrophyta
- Clade: PX
- Class: Phaeophyceae; Kjellman, 1891

Orders
- See classification

Synonyms
- Fucophyceae Warming, 1884; Melanophyceae Rabenhorst, 1863; Phaeophyta

= Brown algae =

Brown algae Temporal range: Late Jurassic to present 150–0 Ma

Large group of multicellular algae, comprising the class Phaeophyceae

Brown algae (sing.: alga) are a large group of photoautotrophic, multicellular SAR comprising the class Phaeophyceae. They include many seaweeds located in colder waters of the Northern Hemisphere. Brown algae are the major seaweeds of the temperate and polar regions. Many brown algae, such as members of the order Fucales, commonly grow along rocky seashores. Most brown algae live in marine environments, where they play an important role both as food and as a potential habitat. For instance, Macrocystis, a kelp of the order Laminariales, may reach 60 m (200 ft) in length and forms prominent underwater kelp forests that contain a high level of biodiversity. Another example is Sargassum, which creates unique floating mats of seaweed in the tropical waters of the Sargasso Sea that serve as the habitats for many species. Some members of the class, such as kelps, are used by humans as food.

Between 1,500 and 2,000 species of brown algae are known worldwide. Some species, such as Ascophyllum nodosum, have become subjects of extensive research in their own right due to their commercial importance. They also have environmental significance through carbon fixation.

Brown algae belong to the Stramenopiles, a clade of eukaryotic organisms belonging to the SAR supergroup, and are thus not closely related to red algae, green algae, nor green plants (which are all archaeplastids). The chloroplasts of brown algae are surrounded by four membranes, suggesting that they were acquired secondarily from a symbiotic relationship between a stramenopile and possibly a red or green alga. Most brown algae contain the pigment fucoxanthin, which is responsible for the distinctive greenish-brown color that gives them their name. Brown algae are unique among Stramenopiles in developing into multicellular forms with differentiated tissues. They still reproduce by means of flagellated spores and gametes that closely resemble cells of other Stramenopiles. Genetic studies show its closest relative to be the species Schizocladia ischiensis, followed by the yellow-green algae.

== Morphology ==
Brown algae exist in a wide range of sizes and forms. The smallest members of the group grow as tiny, feathery tufts of threadlike cells no more than a few centimeters (a few inches) long. Some species have a stage in their life cycle that consists of only a few cells, making the entire alga microscopic. Other groups of brown algae grow to much larger sizes. The rockweeds and leathery kelps are often the most conspicuous algae in their habitats. Kelps can range in size from the 60-centimeter-tall (2 ft) sea palm Postelsia to the giant kelp Macrocystis pyrifera, which grows to over 50 m (150 ft) long and is the largest of all the algae. In form, the brown algae range from small crusts or cushions to leafy free-floating mats formed by species of Sargassum. They may consist of delicate felt-like strands of cells, as in Ectocarpus, or of 30-centimeter-long (1 ft) flattened branches resembling a fan, as in Padina.

Regardless of size or form, two visible features set the Phaeophyceae apart from all other algae. First, members of the group possess a characteristic color that ranges from an olive green to various shades of brown. The particular shade depends upon the amount of fucoxanthin present in the alga. Second, all brown algae are multicellular. There are no known species that exist as single cells or as colonies of cells, and the brown algae are the only major group of seaweeds that does not include such forms. However, this may be the result of classification rather than a consequence of evolution, as all the groups hypothesized to be the closest relatives of the browns include single-celled or colonial forms. They can change color depending on salinity, ranging from reddish to brown.

=== Visible structures ===
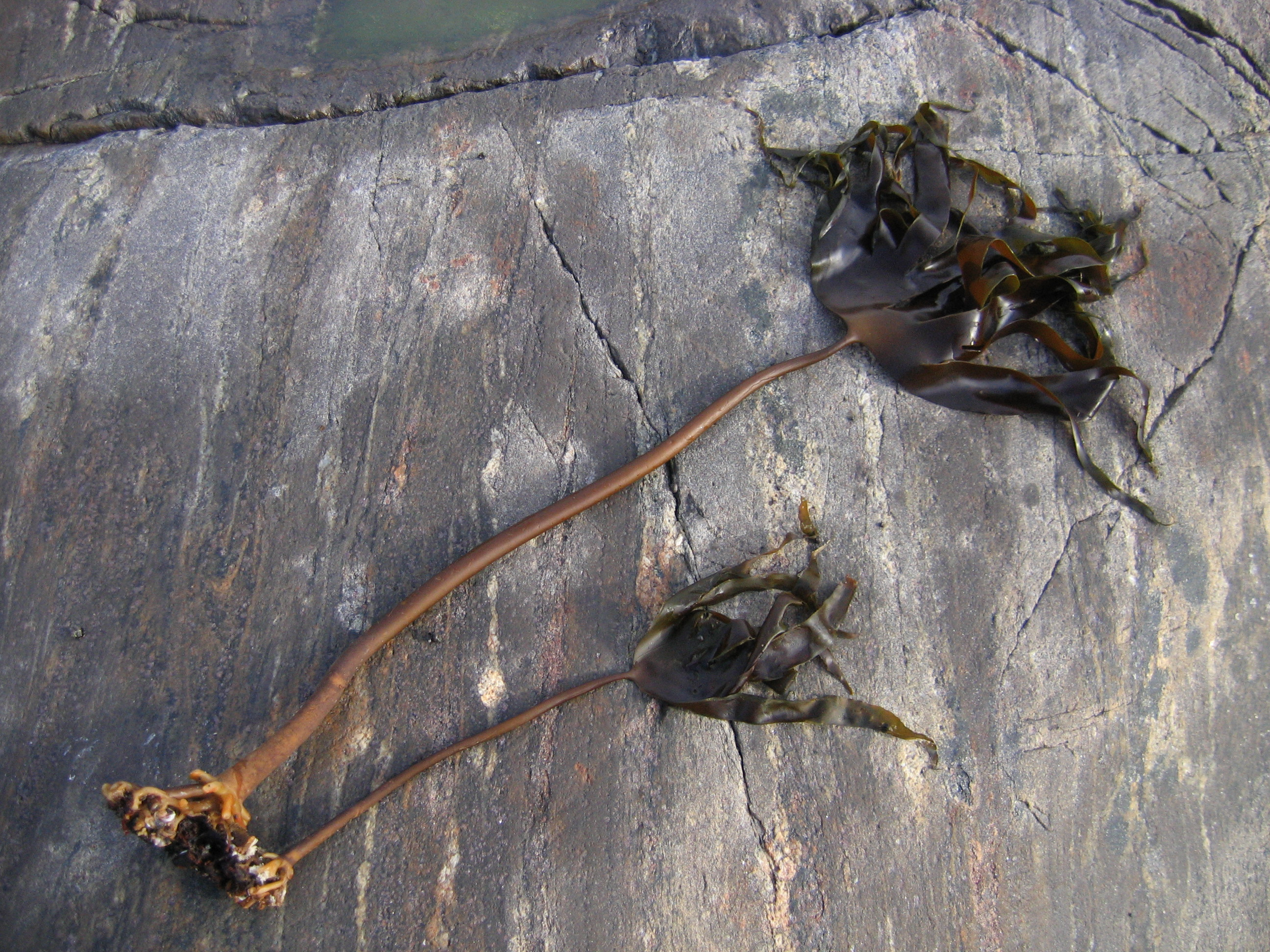
Two specimens of Laminaria hyperborea, each showing the rootlike holdfast at lower left, a divided blade at upper right, and a stemlike stipe connecting the blade to the holdfast.

Whatever their form, the body of all brown algae is termed a thallus, indicating that it lacks the complex xylem and phloem of vascular plants. This does not mean that brown algae completely lack specialized structures. But, because some botanists define "true" stems, leaves, and roots by the presence of these tissues, their absence in the brown algae means that the stem-like and leaf-like structures found in some groups of brown algae must be described using different terminology. Although not all brown algae are structurally complex, those that are typically possess one or more characteristic parts.

A holdfast is a rootlike structure present at the base of the algae. Like a root system in plants, a holdfast serves to anchor the alga in place on the substrate where it grows, and thus prevents the alga from being carried away by the current. Unlike a root system, the holdfast does not serve as the primary organ for water uptake, nor does it take in nutrients from the substrate. The overall physical appearance of the holdfast differs among various brown algae and among various substrates. It may be heavily branched, or it may be cup-like in appearance. A single alga typically has just one holdfast, although some species have more than one stipe growing from their holdfast.

A stipe is a stalk or stemlike structure present in an alga. It may grow as a short structure near the base of the alga (as in Laminaria), or it may develop into a large, complex structure running throughout the algal body (as in Sargassum or Macrocystis). In the most structurally differentiated brown algae (such as Fucus), the tissues within the stipe are divided into three distinct layers or regions. These regions include a central pith, a surrounding cortex, and an outer epidermis, each of which has an analog in the stem of a vascular plant. In some brown algae, the pith region includes a core of elongated cells that resemble the phloem of vascular plants both in structure and function. In others (such as Nereocystis), the center of the stipe is hollow and filled with gas that serves to keep that part of the alga buoyant. The stipe may be relatively flexible and elastic in species like Macrocystis pyrifera that grow in strong currents, or may be more rigid in species like Postelsia palmaeformis that are exposed to the atmosphere at low tide.

Many algae have a flattened portion that may resemble a leaf, and this is termed a blade, lamina, or frond. The name blade is most often applied to a single undivided structure, while frond may be applied to all or most of an algal body that is flattened, but this distinction is not universally applied. The name lamina refers to that portion of a structurally differentiated alga that is flattened. It may be a single or a divided structure, and may be spread over a substantial portion of the alga. In rockweeds, for example, the lamina is a broad wing of tissue that runs continuously along both sides of a branched midrib. The midrib and lamina together constitute almost all of a rockweed, so that the lamina is spread throughout the alga rather than existing as a localized portion of it.

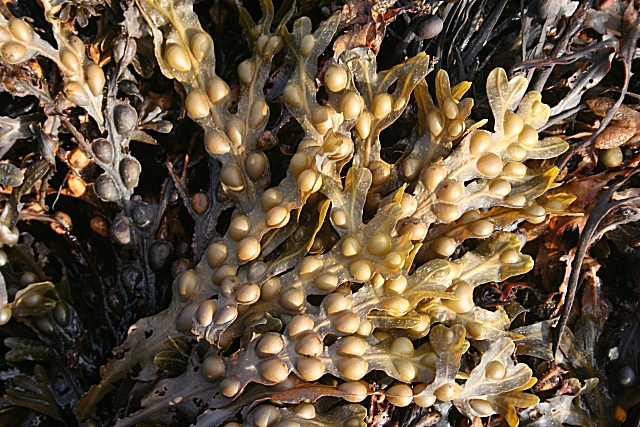
Fucus vesiculosus produces numerous gas-filled pneumatocysts (air bladders) to increase buoyancy.

In some brown algae, there is a single lamina or blade, while in others there may be many separate blades. Even in those species that initially produce a single blade, the structure may tear with rough currents or as part of maturation to form additional blades. These blades may be attached directly to the stipe, to a holdfast with no stipe present, or there may be an air bladder between the stipe and blade. The surface of the lamina or blade may be smooth or wrinkled; its tissues may be thin and flexible or thick and leathery. In species like Egregia menziesii, this characteristic may change depending upon the turbulence of the waters in which it grows. In other species, the surface of the blade is coated with slime to discourage the attachment of epiphytes or to deter herbivores. Blades are also often the parts of the alga that bear the reproductive structures.

Gas-filled floats called pneumatocysts provide buoyancy in many kelps and members of the Fucales. These bladder-like structures occur in or near the lamina, so that it is held nearer the water surface and thus receives more light for photosynthesis. Pneumatocysts are most often spherical or ellipsoidal, but can vary in shape among different species. Species such as Nereocystis luetkeana and Pelagophycus porra bear a single large pneumatocyst between the top of the stipe and the base of the blades. In contrast, the giant kelp Macrocystis pyrifera bears many blades along its stipe, with a pneumatocyst at the base of each blade where it attaches to the main stipe. Species of Sargassum also bear many blades and pneumatocysts, but both kinds of structures are attached separately to the stipe by short stalks. In species of Fucus, the pneumatocysts develop within the lamina itself, either as discrete spherical bladders or as elongated gas-filled regions that take the outline of the lamina in which they develop.

=== Growth ===
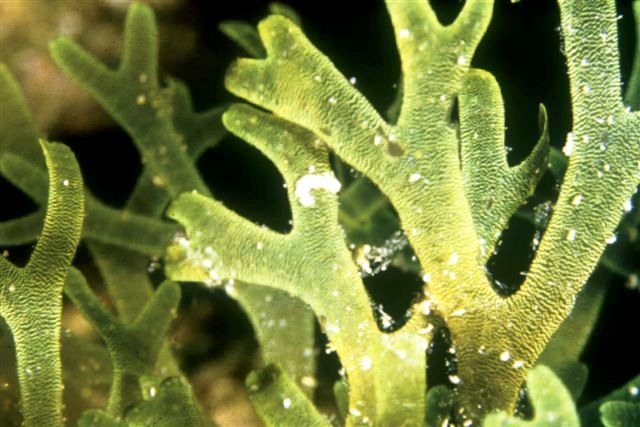
Growth in Dictyota dichotoma occurs at each frond tip, where new cells are produced.

The brown algae include the largest and fastest growing of seaweeds. Fronds of Macrocystis may grow as much as 50 cm (20 in) per day, and the stipes can grow 6 cm (2.4 in) in a single day.

Growth in most brown algae occurs at the tips of structures as a result of divisions in a single apical cell or in a row of such cells. As this apical cell divides, the new cells that it produces develop into all the tissues of the alga. Branchings and other lateral structures appear when the apical cell divides to produce two new apical cells. However, a few groups (such as Ectocarpus) grow by a diffuse, unlocalized production of new cells that can occur anywhere on the thallus.

=== Tissue organization ===
The simplest brown algae are filamentous—that is, their cells are elongate and have septa cutting across their width. They branch by getting wider at their tip, and then dividing the widening.

These filaments may be haplostichous or polystichous and either multiaxial or monoaxial. In some species the filaments intermesh closely to form a pseudoparenchyma. In addition to frond-forming species, there are large parenchymatic kelps with three-dimensional growth and distinct tissues (meristoderm, cortex and medulla) which could be considered the trees of the sea. There are also orders such as the Fucales and Dictyotales, which are smaller than kelps but still parenchymatic with the same kind of distinct tissues.

The cell wall consists of two layers. The inner layer is composed of cellulose and provides reinforcement. The outer layer is composed mainly of algin, which is gummy when wet but becomes hard and brittle when it dries out. Alginates and sulfated fucans are the primary components of the cell wall, each accounting for up to 40% of its composition, whereas cellulose—a major component of most plant cell walls—makes up only a small fraction (up to 8%). The biosynthesis pathways for cellulose and alginate appear to have been acquired from other organisms via endosymbiotic and horizontal gene transfer, respectively, whereas the sulfated polysaccharides are of ancestral origin. Cellulose synthases appear to originate from the red algal endosymbiont of the photosynthetic stramenopile ancestor, while the brown algal ancestor acquired key enzymes for alginate biosynthesis from an actinobacterium. Together with pre-existing cellulose, the ability to fine-tune alginate structure may have enabled brown algae to evolve complex multicellular forms such as kelps.

== Evolutionary history ==
Genetic and ultrastructural evidence place the Phaeophyceae among the Stramenopiles, a large assemblage of organisms that includes both photosynthetic members with plastids (such as the diatoms) as well as non-photosynthetic groups (such as the slime nets and water molds). Although some Stramenopile relatives of the brown algae lack plastids in their cells, scientists believe this is a result of evolutionary loss of that organelle in those groups rather than independent acquisition by the several photosynthetic members. Thus, all Stramenopiles are believed to descend from a single heterotrophic ancestor that became photosynthetic when it acquired plastids through secondary endosymbiosis of another unicellular eukaryote, possibly a red or a green algae.

Although brown algae don't contain any unicellular species, the closest relatives of them do. DNA sequence comparison also suggests that the brown algae evolved from the filamentous Phaeothamniophyceae, Xanthophyceae, or the Chrysophyceae between 150 and 200 million years ago. In many ways, the evolution of the brown algae parallels that of the green algae and red algae, as all three groups possess complex multicellular species with an alternation of generations. Analysis of 5S rRNA sequences reveals much smaller evolutionary distances among genera of the brown algae than among genera of red or green algae, which suggests that the brown algae have diversified much more recently than the other two groups.

=== Fossils ===
The occurrence of Phaeophyceae as fossils is rare due to their generally soft-bodied nature, and scientists continue to debate the identification of some finds. Part of the problem with identification lies in the convergent evolution of morphologies between many brown and red algae. Most fossils of soft-tissue algae preserve only a flattened outline, without the microscopic features that permit the major groups of multicellular algae to be reliably distinguished. Among the brown algae, only species of the genus Padina deposit significant quantities of minerals in or around their cell walls. Other algal groups, such as the red algae and green algae, have a number of calcareous members. Because of this, they are more likely to leave evidence in the fossil record than the soft bodies of most brown algae and more often can be precisely classified.

Fossils comparable in morphology to brown algae are known from strata as old as the Upper Ordovician, but the taxonomic affinity of these impression fossils is far from certain. Claims that earlier Ediacaran fossils are brown algae have since been dismissed. While many carbonaceous fossils have been described from the Precambrian, they are typically preserved as flattened outlines or fragments measuring only millimeters long. Because these fossils lack features diagnostic for identification at even the highest level, they are assigned to fossil form taxa according to their shape and other gross morphological features. A number of Devonian fossils termed fucoids, from their resemblance in outline to species in the genus Fucus, have proven to be inorganic rather than true fossils. The Devonian megafossil Prototaxites, which consists of masses of filaments grouped into trunk-like axes, has been considered a possible brown alga. However, modern research favors reinterpretation of this fossil as a terrestrial fungus or fungal-like organism. Likewise, the fossil Protosalvinia was once considered a possible brown alga, but is now thought to be an early land plant.

A number of Paleozoic fossils have been tentatively classified with the brown algae, although most have also been compared to known red algae species. Phascolophyllaphycus possesses numerous elongate, inflated blades attached to a stipe. It is the most abundant of algal fossils found in a collection made from Carboniferous strata in Illinois. Each hollow blade bears up to eight pneumatocysts at its base, and the stipes appear to have been hollow and inflated as well. This combination of characteristics is similar to certain modern genera in the order Laminariales (kelps). Several fossils of Drydenia and a single specimen of Hungerfordia from the Upper Devonian of New York have also been compared to both brown and red algae. Fossils of Drydenia consist of an elliptical blade attached to a branching filamentous holdfast, not unlike some species of Laminaria, Porphyra, or Gigartina. The single known specimen of Hungerfordia branches dichotomously into lobes and resembles genera like Chondrus and Fucus or Dictyota.

The earliest known fossils that can be assigned reliably to the Phaeophyceae come from Miocene diatomite deposits of the Monterey Formation in California. Several soft-bodied brown macroalgae, such as Julescraneia, have been found.

== Classification ==
=== Phylogeny ===
Based on the work of Silberfeld, Rousseau & de Reviers 2014.

- - - Discosporangiales
      - Choristocarpaceae
      - Discosporangiaceae
  - - - Ishigeales
        - Ishigeaceae
        - Petrodermataceae
    - - Dictyotophycidae
        - Onslowiales
        - - Dictyotales
          - - Syringodermatales
            - Sphacelariales
              - Lithodermataceae
              - - Phaeostrophiaceae
                - - Stypocaulaceae
                  - - Cladostephaceae
                    - Sphacelariaceae
      - Fucophycidae
        - Bachelotiaceae
        - - Desmarestiales
          - - - Sporochnales
              - Ascoseirales
            - - - Ralfsiales
                - - Tilopteridales
                    - Cutleriaceae
                    - - Tilopteridaceae
                      - Phyllariaceae
                  - - Nemodermatales
                    - Fucales
                      - Sargassaceae
                      - - Durvillaeaceae
                        - - Himanthaliaceae
                          - Fucaceae
              - - - Scytothamnales
                    - Asteronemataceae
                    - Splachnidiaceae
                - - Laminariales
                    - - Phaeosiphoniellaceae
                      - - Akkesiphycaceae
                        - Pseudochordaceae
                    - - Chordaceae
                      - - Alariaceae
                        - - Agaraceae
                          - Laminariaceae
                  - - Asterocladales
                    - Ectocarpales
                      - Adenocystaceae
                      - - - Scytosiphonaceae
                          - - Petrospongiaceae
                            - Ectocarpaceae
                        - - Acinetosporaceae
                          - Chordariaceae

=== Taxonomy ===
This is a list of the orders in the class Phaeophyceae:

- Class Phaeophyceae Hansgirg 1886 [Fucophyceae; Melanophycidae Rabenhorst 1863 stat. nov. Cavalier-Smith 2006]
  - Subclass Discosporangiophycidae Silberfeld, Rousseau & Reviers 2014
    - Order Discosporangiales Schmidt 1937 emend. Kawai et al. 2007
      - Family Choristocarpaceae Kjellman 1891
      - Family Discosporangiaceae Schmidt 1937
  - Subclass Ishigeophycidae Silberfeld, Rousseau & Reviers 2014
    - Order Ishigeales Cho & Boo 2004
      - Family Ishigeaceae Okamura 1935
      - Family Petrodermataceae Silberfeld, Rousseau & Reviers 2014
  - Subclass Dictyotophycidae Silberfeld, Rousseau & Reviers 2014
    - Order Dictyotales Bory de Saint-Vincent 1828 ex Phillips et al.
      - Family Dictyotaceae Lamouroux ex Dumortier 1822 [Scoresbyellaceae Womersley 1987; Dictyopsidaceae]
    - Order Onslowiales Draisma & Prud'homme van Reine 2008
      - Family Onslowiaceae Draisma & Prud'homme van Reine 2001
    - Order Sphacelariales Migula 1909
      - Family Cladostephaceae Oltmanns 1922
      - Family Lithodermataceae Hauck 1883
      - Family Phaeostrophiaceae Kawai et al. 2005
      - Family Sphacelariaceae Decaisne 1842
      - Family Sphacelodermaceae Draisma, Prud'homme & Kawai 2010
      - Family Stypocaulaceae Oltmanns 1922
    - Order Syringodermatales Henry 1984
      - Family Syringodermataceae Henry 1984
  - Subclass Fucophycidae Cavalier-Smith 1986
    - Order Ascoseirales Petrov1964 emend. Moe & Henry 1982
      - Family Ascoseiraceae Skottsberg 1907
    - Order Asterocladales T.Silberfeld et al. 2011
      - Family Asterocladaceae Silberfeld et al. 2011
    - Order Desmarestiales Setchell & Gardner 1925
      - Family Arthrocladiaceae Chauvin 1842
      - Family Desmarestiaceae (Thuret) Kjellman 1880
    - Order Ectocarpales Bessey 1907 emend. Rousseau & Reviers 1999a [Chordariales Setchell & Gardner 1925; Dictyosiphonales Setchell & Gardner 1925; Scytosiphonales Feldmann 1949]
      - Family Acinetosporaceae Hamel ex Feldmann 1937 [Pylaiellaceae; Pilayellaceae]
      - Family Adenocystaceae Rousseau et al. 2000 emend. Silberfeld et al. 2011 [Chordariopsidaceae]
      - Family Chordariaceae Greville 1830 emend. Peters & Ramírez 2001 [Myrionemataceae]
      - Family Ectocarpaceae Agardh 1828 emend. Silberfeld et al. 2011
      - Family Petrospongiaceae Racault et al. 2009
      - Family Scytosiphonaceae Ardissone & Straforello 1877 [Chnoosporaceae Setchell & Gardner 1925]
    - Order Fucales Bory de Saint-Vincent 1827 [Notheiales Womersley 1987; Durvillaeales Petrov 1965]
      - Family Bifurcariopsidaceae Cho et al. 2006
      - Family Durvillaeaceae (Oltmanns) De Toni 1891
      - Family Fucaceae Adanson 1763
      - Family Himanthaliaceae (Kjellman) De Toni 1891
      - Family Hormosiraceae Fritsch 1945
      - Family Notheiaceae Schmidt 1938
      - Family Sargassaceae Kützing 1843 [Cystoseiraceae De Toni 1891]
      - Family Seirococcaceae Nizamuddin 1987
      - Family Xiphophoraceae Cho et al. 2006
    - Order Laminariales Migula 1909 [Phaeosiphoniellales Silberfeld, Rousseau & Reviers 2014 ord. nov. prop.]
      - Family Agaraceae Postels & Ruprecht 1840 [Costariaceae]
      - Family Akkesiphycaceae Kawai & Sasaki 2000
      - Family Alariaceae Setchell & Gardner 1925
      - Family Aureophycaceae Kawai & Ridgway 2013
      - Family Chordaceae Dumortier 1822
      - Family Laminariaceae Bory de Saint-Vincent 1827 [Arthrothamnaceae Petrov 1974]
      - Family Lessoniaceae Setchell & Gardner 1925
      - Family Pseudochordaceae Kawai & Kurogi 1985
    - Order Nemodermatales Parente et al. 2008
      - Family Nemodermataceae Kuckuck ex Feldmann 1937
    - Order Phaeosiphoniellales Silberfeld, Rousseau & Reviers 2014
      - Family Phaeosiphoniellaceae Phillips et al. 2008
    - Order Ralfsiales Nakamura ex Lim & Kawai 2007
      - Family Mesosporaceae Tanaka & Chihara 1982
      - Family Neoralfsiaceae Lim & Kawai 2007
      - Family Ralfsiaceae Farlow 1881 [Heterochordariaceae Setchell & Gardner 1925]
    - Order Scytothamnales Peters & Clayton 1998 emend. Silberfeld et al. 2011
      - Family Asteronemataceae Silberfeld et al. 2011
      - Family Bachelotiaceae Silberfeld et al. 2011
      - Family Splachnidiaceae Mitchell & Whitting 1892 [Scytothamnaceae Womersley 1987]
    - Order Sporochnales Sauvageau 1926
      - Family Sporochnaceae Greville 1830
    - Order Tilopteridales Bessey 1907 emend. Phillips et al. 2008 [Cutleriales Bessey 1907]
      - Family Cutleriaceae Griffith & Henfrey 1856
      - Family Halosiphonaceae Kawai & Sasaki 2000
      - Family Phyllariaceae Tilden 1935
      - Family Stschapoviaceae Kawai 2004
      - Family Tilopteridaceae Kjellman 1890

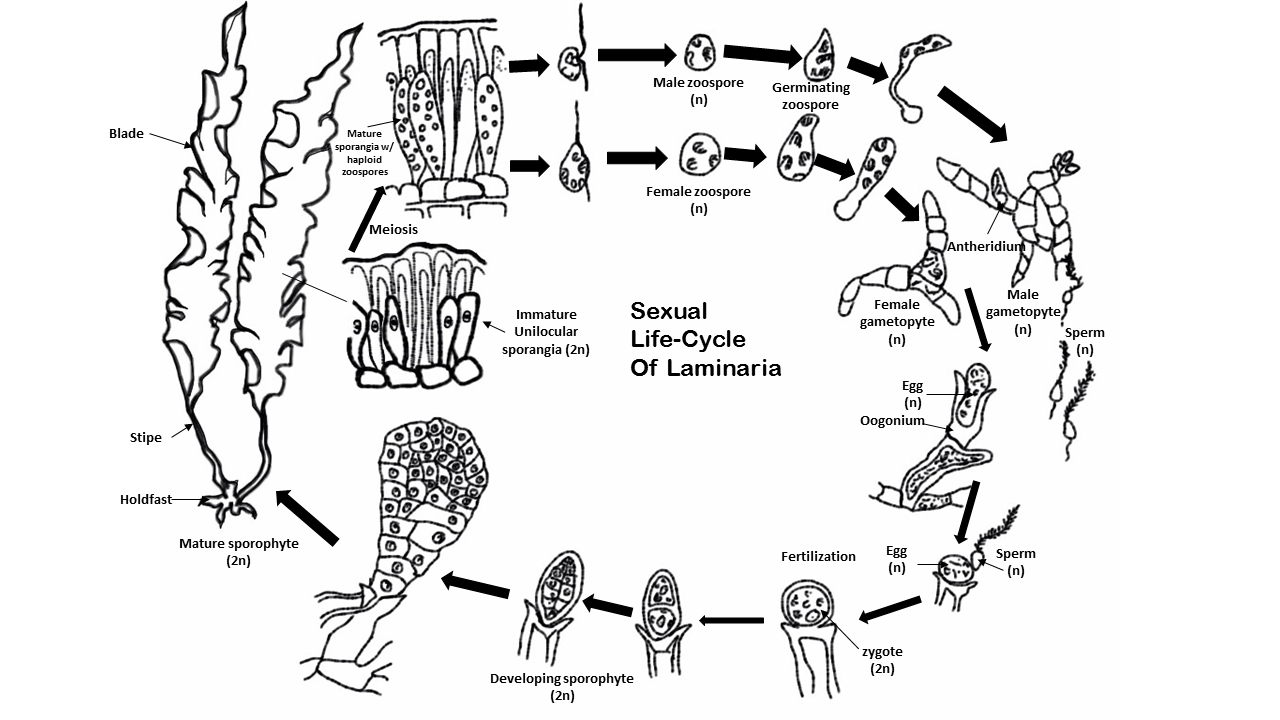
The life cycle of a representative genus, Laminaria. Most brown algae follow this form of sexual reproduction.

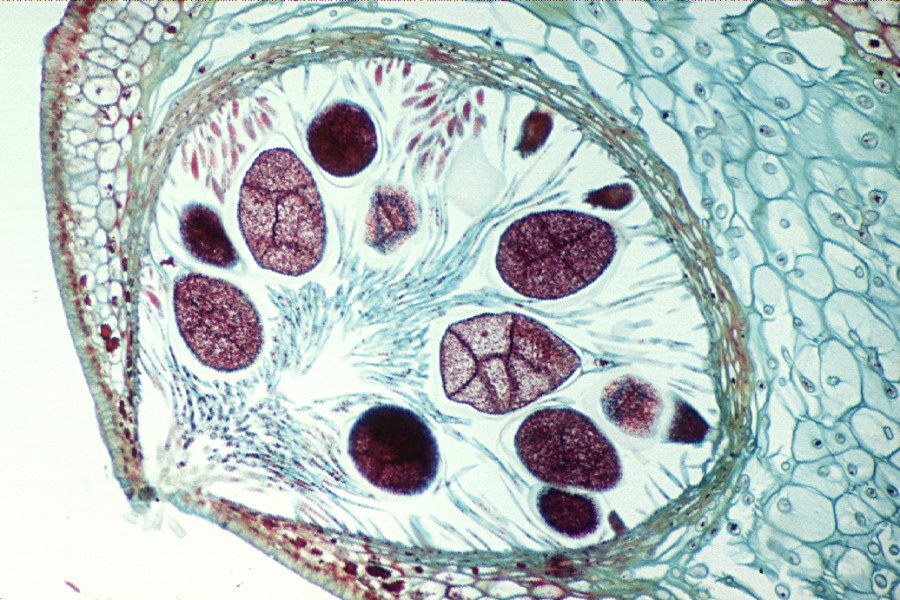
A closeup of a Fucus conceptacle.

== Life cycle ==
Most brown algae, with the exception of the Fucales, perform sexual reproduction through sporic meiosis. Between generations, the algae go through separate sporophyte (diploid) and gametophyte (haploid) phases. The sporophyte stage is often the more visible of the two, though some species of brown algae have similar diploid and haploid phases. Free floating forms of brown algae often do not undergo sexual reproduction until they attach themselves to substrate. The haploid generation consists of male and female gametophytes. The fertilization of egg cells varies between species of brown algae, and may be isogamous, oogamous, or anisogamous. Fertilization may take place in the water with eggs and motile sperm, or within the oogonium itself.

Certain species of brown algae can also perform asexual reproduction through the production of motile diploid zoospores. These zoospores form in plurilocular sporangium, and can mature into the sporophyte phase immediately.

In a representative species Laminaria, there is a conspicuous diploid generation and smaller haploid generations. Meiosis takes place within several unilocular sporangium along the algae's blade, each one forming either haploid male or female zoospores. The spores are then released from the sporangia and grow to form male and female gametophytes. The female gametophyte produces an egg in the oogonium, and the male gametophyte releases motile sperm that fertilize the egg. The fertilized zygote then grows into the mature diploid sporophyte.

In the order Fucales, sexual reproduction is oogamous, and the mature diploid is the only form for each generation. Gametes are formed in specialized conceptacles that occur scattered on both surfaces of the receptacle, the outer portion of the blades of the parent plant. Egg cells and motile sperm are released from separate sacs within the conceptacles of the parent algae, combining in the water to complete fertilization. The fertilized zygote settles onto a surface and then differentiates into a leafy thallus and a finger-like holdfast. Light regulates differentiation of the zygote into blade and holdfast.

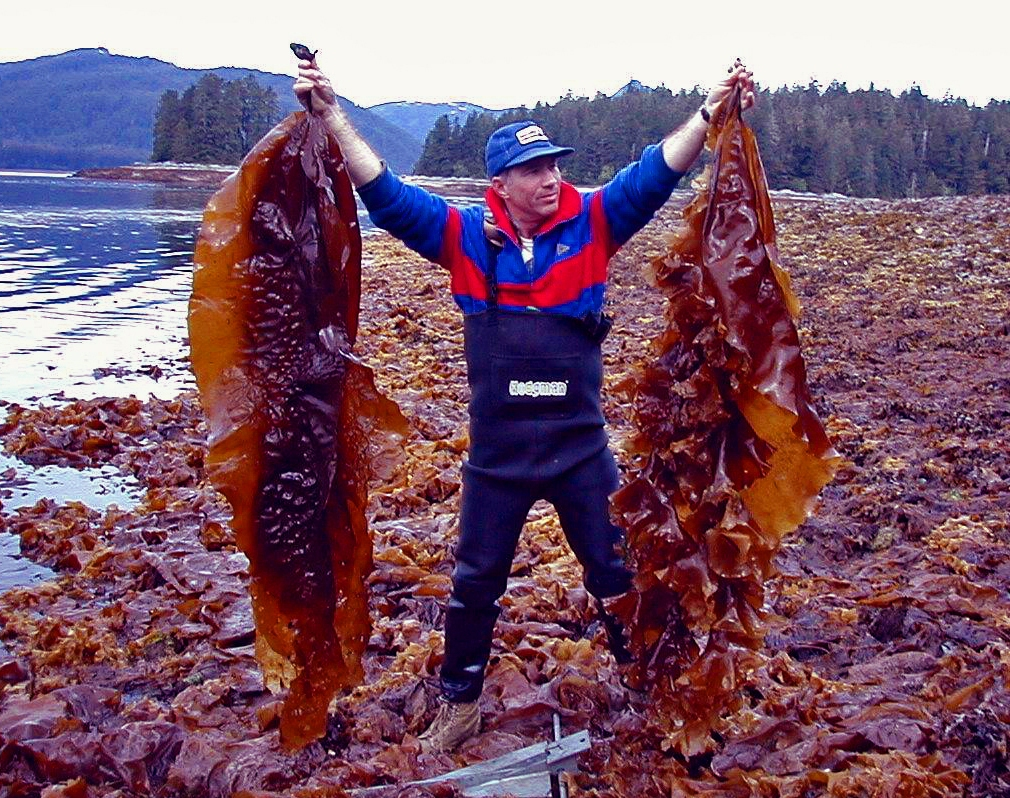
Saccharina latissima on a beach.

== Sex determination ==
Most brown algae have a U/V sex-determination system, with male gametophytes harboring a V chromosome and female gametophytes harboring a U chromosome. Sex determination is controlled by an HMG-box protein named MIN, which is present in the male V chromosome of all brown algal species. The U/V sex chromosomes are ancestral to the brown algal lineage, arising somewhere between 450 and 224 million years ago. The closest extant relative of the brown algae, Schizocladia ischiensis, does not have U/V sex chromosomes. However, its genome does harbor the male-determinant gene MIN. This, alongside ancestral state reconstruction analyses, suggest that the origin of the U/V sex chromosomes involved a recombination suppression event that included the gene MIN and other six genes, which defined the ancestral sex-determining region of the U/V system. Transcriptomic, genomic and gene-editing evidence suggest that the U chromosome may also contain important genes involved in female sex determination, since knock-out mutants of MIN do not lead to functional female phenotypes unless these mutants also harbor a U chromosome.

Not all brown algal species have a U/V system. Some brown algae evolved a monoicous system (i.e., co-sexuality). These species have several V-derived genes (including MIN) and only a few U-derived genes, indicating that monoicous species evolved from a male genetic background that translocated putative female-determining genes.

Another group of species that lost the U/V system are the Fucales, an Order of brown algae that evolved a full diplont life cycle, leading to the loss of the haploid U/V sex determining system. Many species in Fucales evolved either a monoecious or an asexual sife cycle, but a few of them evolved separate sexes again. From the Fucales, the species Fucus serratus seems to have evolved a putative X/Y system. Male Fucus serratus show differential gene expression of the gene MIN, but the gene is also present in the genome of female individuals, suggesting the emergence of a new male-determining factor that has not been found yet.

== Ecology ==
Brown algae have adapted to a wide variety of marine ecological niches including the tidal splash zone, rock pools, the whole intertidal zone and relatively deep near shore waters. They are an important constituent of some brackish water ecosystems, and have colonized freshwater on a minimum of six known occasions. A large number of Phaeophyceae are intertidal or upper littoral, and they are predominantly cool and cold water organisms that benefit from nutrients in up welling cold water currents and inflows from land; Sargassum being a prominent exception to this generalisation.

Brown algae growing in brackish waters are almost solely asexual.

== Chemistry ==
Algal group	δ^{13}C range
HCO_{3}-using red algae	−22.5‰ to −9.6‰
CO_{2}-using red algae	−34.5‰ to −29.9‰
Brown algae	−20.8‰ to −10.5‰
Green algae	−20.3‰ to −8.8‰

Brown algae have a δ^{13}C value in the range of −30.0‰ to −10.5‰, in contrast with red algae and greens. This reflects their different metabolic pathways.

They have cellulose walls with alginic acid and also contain the polysaccharide fucoidan in the amorphous sections of their cell walls. A few species (of Padina) calcify with aragonite needles.

In addition to alginates, fucoidan and cellulose, the carbohydrate composition of brown algae consists of mannitol, laminarin and glucan.

The photosynthetic system of brown algae is made of a P700 complex containing chlorophyll a. Their plastids also contain chlorophyll c and carotenoids (the most widespread of those being fucoxanthin).

Brown algae produce a specific type of tannin called phlorotannins in higher amounts than red algae do.

== Importance and uses ==
Brown algae include a number of edible seaweeds. All brown algae contain alginic acid (alginate) in their cell walls, which is extracted commercially and used as an industrial thickening agent in food and for other uses. One of these products is used in lithium-ion batteries. Alginic acid is used as a stable component of a battery anode. This polysaccharide is a major component of brown algae, and is not found in land plants.

Alginic acid can also be used in aquaculture. For example, alginic acid enhances the immune system of rainbow trout. Younger fish are more likely to survive when given a diet with alginic acid.

Brown algae including kelp beds also fix a significant portion of the earth's carbon dioxide yearly through photosynthesis. Additionally, they can store a great amount of carbon dioxide. Sargachromanol G, an extract of Sargassum siliquastrum, has been shown to have anti-inflammatory effects.

=== Edible brown algae ===
==== Kelp (Laminariales) ====
- Arame (Eisenia bicyclis)
- Badderlocks (Alaria esculenta)
- Cochayuyo (Durvillaea antarctica)
- Ecklonia cava
- Kombu (Saccharina japonica)
- Oarweed (Laminaria digitata)
- Sea palm Postelsia palmaeformis
- Sea whip (Nereocystis luetkeana)
- Sugar kelp (Saccharina latissima)
- Wakame (Undaria pinnatifida)
- Hirome (Undaria undarioides)

==== Fucales ====
- Bladderwrack (Fucus vesiculosus)
- Channelled wrack (Pelvetia canaliculata)
- Hijiki or Hiziki (Sargassum fusiforme)
- Limu Kala (Sargassum echinocarpum)
- Sargassum
  - Sargassum cinetum
  - Sargassum vulgare
  - Sargassum swartzii
  - Sargassum myriocysum
- Spiral wrack (Fucus spiralis)
- Thongweed (Himanthalia elongata)

==== Ectocarpales ====
- Mozuku (Cladosiphon okamuranus)

== See also ==
- Wrack (seaweed)
