= Bieckol =

Bieckol may refer to:

- 6,6'-Bieckol
- 8,8'-Bieckol

== See also ==
- Dieckol
