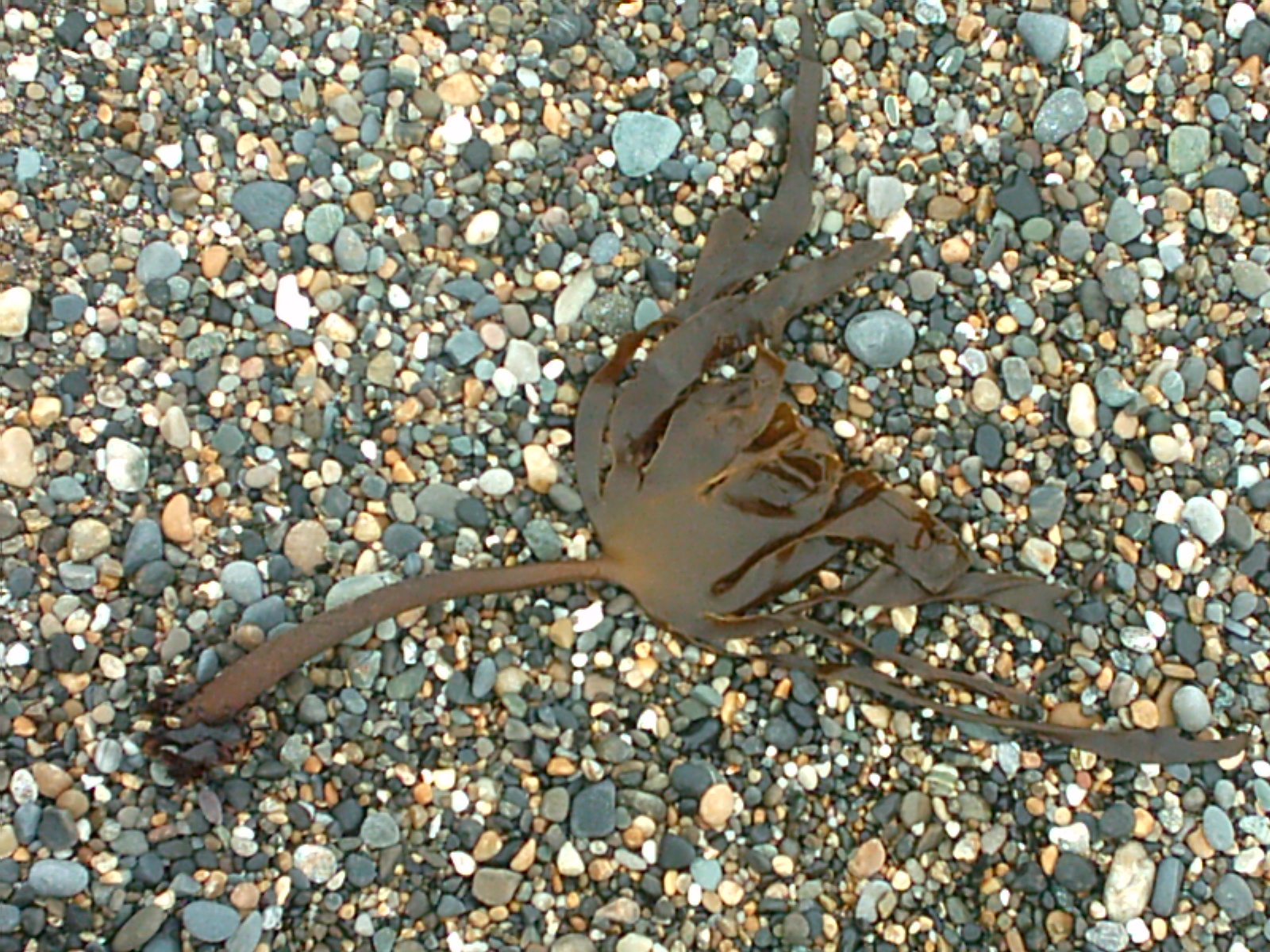
- Ecklonia cava

Scientific classification
- Domain: Eukaryota
- Supergroup: Stramenopiles
- Division: Ochrophyta
- Class: Phaeophyceae
- Order: Laminariales
- Family: Lessoniaceae
- Genus: Ecklonia
- Species: E. cava

Binomial name
- Ecklonia cava Kjellm., 1885

= Ecklonia cava =

Species of seaweed

Ecklonia cava, also called paddle weed, kajime (Japanese: 搗布/未滑海藻), noro-kajime, or gamtae (Korean: 감태), is an edible marine brown alga species found in the ocean off Japan and Korea.

It is used as an herbal remedy in the form of an extract called Seanol, a polyphenolic extract, and Ventol, a phlorotannin-rich natural agent. Phlorotannins, such as fucodiphlorethol G, 7-phloro eckol, 6,6'-bieckol, eckol, 8,8'-bieckol, 8,4"'-dieckol and phlorofucofuroeckol A can be isolated from Ecklonia cava. Other components are common sterol derivatives (fucosterol, ergosterol and cholesterol).

It is also identified as a viable colloid source for use in the biotech industry.

== Nomenclature ==
Ecklonia cava answers to the English common name "paddle weed"; it is also referred by the common names "kajime" or "noro-kajime" of Japanese origin.

In fact, the standard common name for E. cava in modern-day Japanese is kajime (カジメ), to be distinguished from the wrinkled-leaved Eisenia bicyclis (syn. Ecklonia bicyclis) known by the common name arame (アラメ). (Note: The "leaf" (lamina) is wrinkled in Ecklonia kurome (kurome) also; the lamina is wrinkled and becomes forked in E. bicyclis. Cf. §Range and speciation, infra.) However, these names are extremely misleading. One pioneering Japanese authority on algae, Kichisaburo Endo, had noted that the terms kajime and arame are confounded regionally, and some places call the kajime "arame", and vice versa. (Note: Endo (1874-1921) published this source in 1903, and he himself applied the common name arame to E. cava, which is the opposite of present-day convention. Endo also identified kajime as Eisenia arborea and described it as having wrinkles or wave-patterns, which is again contrary to present-day convention which states arame is distinguished by its wrinkles.)

The local names for E. cava are kajime, gohei kajime, noro kajime, aburame, obirame, etc., in Chiba Prefecture and anroku in Mie Prefecture and Tokushima Prefecture; it has been called amoto or ista in parts of Mie Prefecture, (Note: Note that Ise Province (in present-day Mie Prefecture) was a historical production center for these seaweeds, cf. infra, §Culinary uses.) according to the name lists compiled by Endo, contemporary phycologist Kibtarō Okamura, and later writers. (Note: The phycologist Kibtarō Okamura (1867-1935), published 1956 who listed E. cava under kajime. Endo (1903) had placed the species under arame.)

The confusion of the names kajime and arame persists to the present day. The converse example where the name kajime is applied to E. bicyclis occurs in Endo (1903), and the tendency to call this plant kajime or kachime or kaome occur in Shizuoka Prefecture.

And historically (going back to the Nara Period), arame seems to have signified either of these seaweeds, and that the term kajime (kachime) was not a name for a different plant, but for the same groups of seaweeds processed into dried powders. This conclusion is derived from studies on wooden shipping tags (mokkan) from the 7–8 centuries: the products labeled as arame (滑海藻/阿良女) are conjectured to have been E. cava or E. bicyclis, depending on the places of origin recorded on the tags. The products labeled as kajime/kachime (未滑海藻/加知女) were likely to signify pulverized forms of either seaweed (rather than a different type of seaweed), as explained in the Wamyō Ruijushō dictionary, which represents to the word kajime as 搗布, which literally means 'pounding cloth/seaweed'. (Note: It has also been asserted that the character representation kachime/kajime "未滑海藻" is a recurrent error for "末滑海藻", the later meaning 'powder arame', which would make rational sense.)

== Range and speciation ==
Ecklonia cava is a perennial brown alga and exists mainly in subtidal areas off the coast of Japan and Korea, especially in kelp forests along the central Pacific coast in Honshu (Southern Bōsō Peninsula/Chiba Prefecture to Wakayama Prefecture), parts of the Seto Inland Sea, the southern coast along the Sea of Japan, and the coast in Kyushu. (Note: Suzuki (2020), citing Yoshida (1998)) The type locality is at Yokosuka, Kanagawa.

There are two other algae taxa Ecklonia kurome (Japanese: kurome) and the Eisenia bicyclis (arame) of similar appearance, habitat, and distribution; the E. kurome are distinguishable by the wrinkled lamina, while E. bicyclis have lamina that are also wrinkled which become forked. The distribution of the smooth-lamina E. cava only extends as far north as the edge of Fukushima Prefecture, while the arame type thrives farther to the edge of Iwate Prefecture. And the wrinkled kurome are far more abundant than the smooth kajime from the Kii Peninsula westward.

However, the heretofore taxonomic distinction made between E. kurome and E. cava based on morphology are recognized to have falsely indicated genetic differences, and recent papers treat E. kurome as a synonym. (Note: Tanaka et al. (2007) apud Takao et al. (2015)) Thus it has been proposed that E. kurome be recognized as a subspecies of E. cava, alongside the tsuruarame subspecies (Ecklonia cava ssp. stolonifera).

The algae determined to be kajime based strictly on morphology have been reported in Shikoku, parts of Kyushu, and southern coasts of the Sea of Japan, but these tend to be the kurome or tsuruarame subspecies.

== Ecosystem ==
It usually creates seaweed beds( marine forests) in waters 2–25 m (6.6–82.0 ft) deep, and can grow to be over 130 cm. As a brown alga, it plays an important role in the ecosystem and habitat of where it lives, providing a source of food and shelter for many marine organisms. They are the primary producers of their ecosystem, and many animals use them as locations for reproducing.

Despite its importance in ecosystem functioning and uses for humans, Ecklonia cava has been decreasing in numbers within recent years. Many factors could contribute to the decline, such as an increase in water temperature, overgrazing, and overuse by humans, but the direct cause of the decrease has not yet been extensively studied. Some evidence suggests an increase in water temperature is responsible, while the low availability of nitrogen in the water can also cause higher death rates. A combination of both factors is likely responsible, since higher temperatures cause lower availability of nitrogen.

Ecklonia cava is an important food source for snails, such as Littorina brevicula (Philippi) and Haliotis discus (Hannai Ino), and other marine organisms. According to one aquacultural experiment, farmed abalone gain 1kg in weight for every 15 kg of this seaweed consumed. Interestingly, it has also been shown that Ecklonia cava has a defense mechanism that causes it to be less palatable after having already been attacked by a herbivore, and these defenses are specific to each species of herbivore. Many species of seaweed and other plants have defenses similar to this, but the specificities of each defense have not been pinpointed.

== Human uses ==
=== Medicinal uses ===
The health benefits of Ecklonia cava and its chemistry have been somewhat studied, leading to its uses in dietary supplements and herbal remedies. An active ingredient, fucosterol, has possible antidepressant, anti diabetic, anticonvulsant effects.

=== Culinary uses ===
Use of seaweed (brown algae) as food can be traced back to the fourth century in Japan, and to the sixth century in China. (Note: McHugh (2003), p. 1; also cited by Turck et al. (2017)) The arame in the loose sense (either E. cava or E. bicyclis) are known to have been trafficked in quantity at least since the Nara Period, as evidenced by wooden tags on transported good (mokkan) which have survived from the 7–8 centuries. The collection of these seaweeds were imposed on Ise Province (Mie Prefecture) during the Nara period, to be sent as tribute to the imperial central government, and later both Ise and Shima Provinces (Mie Prefecture) were subjected to this levy, according to the Engishiki.

Though these seaweeds are attested to have been eaten in these ancient times, the details of the culinary use are unknown, though it has been speculated that these seaweeds were consumed as food in a manner similar to how they are used today. These seaweeds are usually preserved dried so as to retain its sliminess after rehydrating, and they can be chopped up into miso soup to add sliminess. Or after removing its slime, they can be turned into simmered dishes (nimono). Nowadays only the juvenile algae are harvested for food in most region, using the large full-grown adults is rare. The kajime is considered to be of inferior quality in taste compared with arame and kurome.

The South Korean company Badasoop grows, processes, and exports Ecklonia cava. Ecklonia cava on its own may be consumed in salad and soups, but its dried powder is also used as flavoring and coloring agent in candies, rice cakes, miso soups, or kimichi.

In the processing of a more major food seaweed, Hizikia fusiformes (hijiki), portions of Ecklonia cava or Eisenia bicyclis (arame) are added in order to moderate the bitter flavor, as well as toning down the intensely dark (blackish) color.
