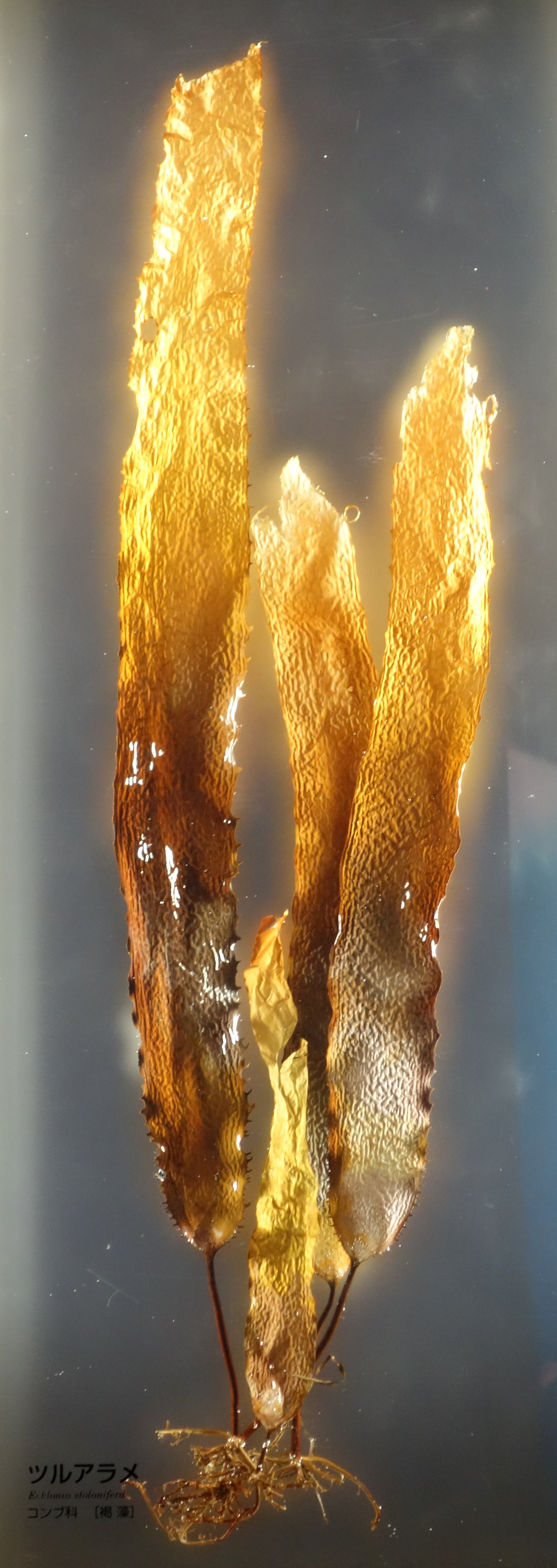
- Ecklonia stolonifera

Scientific classification
- Domain: Eukaryota
- Clade: Diaphoretickes
- Clade: SAR
- Clade: Stramenopiles
- Phylum: Gyrista
- Subphylum: Ochrophytina
- Class: Phaeophyceae
- Order: Laminariales
- Family: Lessoniaceae
- Genus: Ecklonia
- Species: E. stolonifera

Binomial name
- Ecklonia stolonifera Okamura, 1913

= Ecklonia stolonifera =

Species of seaweed

Ecklonia stolonifera (Japanese: ツルアラメ, turuarame) is a brown alga species in the genus Ecklonia found in the Sea of Japan. It is an edible species traditionally eaten in Japan.

== Chemistry ==
=== Phlorotannins ===
Ecklonia stolonifera contains the phlorotannins phlorofucofuroeckol A, eckol, dieckol, dioxinodehydroeckol (eckstolonol), 2-phloroeckol, phlorofucofuroeckol B, 6,6'-bieckol, triphlorethol-A, phloroglucinol and 7-phloroeckol.

Those phlorotannins are responsible for the potent pharmacological effects associated with this seaweed. These molecules show a hepatoprotective activity.

=== Oxylipins ===
The oxylipins ecklonialactones A, B, C, D, E and F and fucosterol can also be isolated from the species.
