= Phlorofucofuroeckol A =

- Chemical structure of phlorofucofuroeckol A

Names
- Preferred IUPAC name 4,9-Bis(3,5-dihydroxyphenoxy)[1]benzofuro[3,2-a]oxanthrene-1,3,6,10,12-pentol

Identifiers
CAS Number	128129-56-6
3D model (JSmol)	Interactive image
ChEMBL	ChEMBL510508
ChemSpider	115819
PubChem CID	130976
CompTox Dashboard (EPA)	DTXSID40155821
- InChI: InChI=1S/C30H18O14/c31-10-1-11(32)4-14(3-10)40-24-17(36)7-16(35)22-23-21(42-28(22)24)9-20(39)25-29(23)43-27-19(38)8-18(37)26(30(27)44-25)41-15-5-12(33)2-13(34)6-15/h1-9,31-39H Key: SLWPBUMYPRVYIJ-UHFFFAOYSA-N
- SMILES: C1=C(C=C(C=C1O)OC2=C(C=C(C3=C2OC4=CC(=C5C(=C43)OC6=C(O5)C(=C(C=C6O)O)OC7=CC(=CC(=C7)O)O)O)O)O)O

Properties
Chemical formula	C_{30}H_{18}O_{14}
Molar mass	602.45 g/mol
- Except where otherwise noted, data are given for materials in their standard state (at 25 °C [77 °F], 100 kPa). Infobox references

Phlorofucofuroeckol A is a phlorotannin isolated from brown algae species such as Eisenia bicyclis (an edible seaweed called arame in Japan), Ecklonia cava, Ecklonia kurome or Ecklonia stolonifera.

The molecule possesses both the dibenzo-1,4-dioxin and dibenzofuran elements.
