= 7-Phloroeckol =

Names
- Preferred IUPAC name 4-(3,5-Dihydroxyphenoxy)-8-(2,4,6-trihydroxyphenoxy)oxanthrene-1,3,6-triol
- Other names 7-Phloroethol

Identifiers
CAS Number	662165-35-7
3D model (JSmol)	Interactive image
ChEBI	CHEBI:65790
ChEMBL	ChEMBL456228
ChemSpider	8656347
PubChem CID	10480940
UNII	97GCC12YF0
CompTox Dashboard (EPA)	DTXSID201030418
- InChI: InChI=1S/C24H16O12/c25-9-1-10(26)3-12(2-9)34-22-17(31)8-18(32)23-24(22)36-21-16(30)6-13(7-19(21)35-23)33-20-14(28)4-11(27)5-15(20)29/h1-8,25-32H Key: JLEVVQRBEATTCM-UHFFFAOYSA-N; InChI=1/C24H16O12/c25-9-1-10(26)3-12(2-9)34-22-17(31)8-18(32)23-24(22)36-21-16(30)6-13(7-19(21)35-23)33-20-14(28)4-11(27)5-15(20)29/h1-8,25-32H Key: JLEVVQRBEATTCM-UHFFFAOYAP
- SMILES: C1=C(C=C(C=C1O)OC2=C(C=C(C3=C2OC4=C(C=C(C=C4O3)OC5=C(C=C(C=C5O)O)O)O)O)O)O

Properties
Chemical formula	C_{24}H_{16}O_{12}
Molar mass	496.37 g/mol
- Except where otherwise noted, data are given for materials in their standard state (at 25 °C [77 °F], 100 kPa). Infobox references

7-Phloroeckol is a phlorotannin found in the edible brown algae arame (Ecklonia bicyclis) and turuarame (Ecklonia stolonifera).
