= Dieckol =

Names
- Preferred IUPAC name 2,4,6-Trioxa-1(1),5(7,1)-dioxanthrena-3(1,4),7(1)-dibenzenaheptaphane-1^{2},1^{4},1^{7},1^{9},3^{3},3^{5},5^{2},5^{4},5^{9},7^{3},7^{5}-undecol

Identifiers
CAS Number	88095-77-6
3D model (JSmol)	Interactive image
ChEBI	CHEBI:65769
ChemSpider	2278311
PubChem CID	3008868
UNII	ZU0ESU4399
CompTox Dashboard (EPA)	DTXSID10388366
- InChI: InChI=1S/C36H22O18/c37-12-1-13(38)3-15(2-12)49-31-22(44)10-25(47)34-35(31)54-30-21(43)8-17(9-27(30)52-34)48-28-19(41)6-16(7-20(28)42)50-32-23(45)11-24(46)33-36(32)53-29-18(40)4-14(39)5-26(29)51-33/h1-11,37-47H Key: DRZQFGYIIYNNEC-UHFFFAOYSA-N
- SMILES: Oc4cc(O)c6Oc(cc(O)cc3O)c3Oc6c4Oc(cc2O)cc(O)c2Oc(cc1Oc5c(O)cc7O)cc(O)c1Oc5c7Oc(c8)cc(O)cc8O

Properties
Chemical formula	C_{36}H_{22}O_{18}
Molar mass	742.52 g/mol
- Except where otherwise noted, data are given for materials in their standard state (at 25 °C [77 °F], 100 kPa). Infobox references

Dieckol is a phlorotannin that can be found in arame (Eisenia bicyclis), in Ecklonia cava or in Ecklonia stolonifera.

This compound shows antithrombotic and profibrinolytic activities. It has also an effect on hair growth.

Dieckol is a GSK-3β inhibitor.

== See also ==
- Procyanidin B3, a proanthocyanidin dimer with the same hair growth-promoting effect
