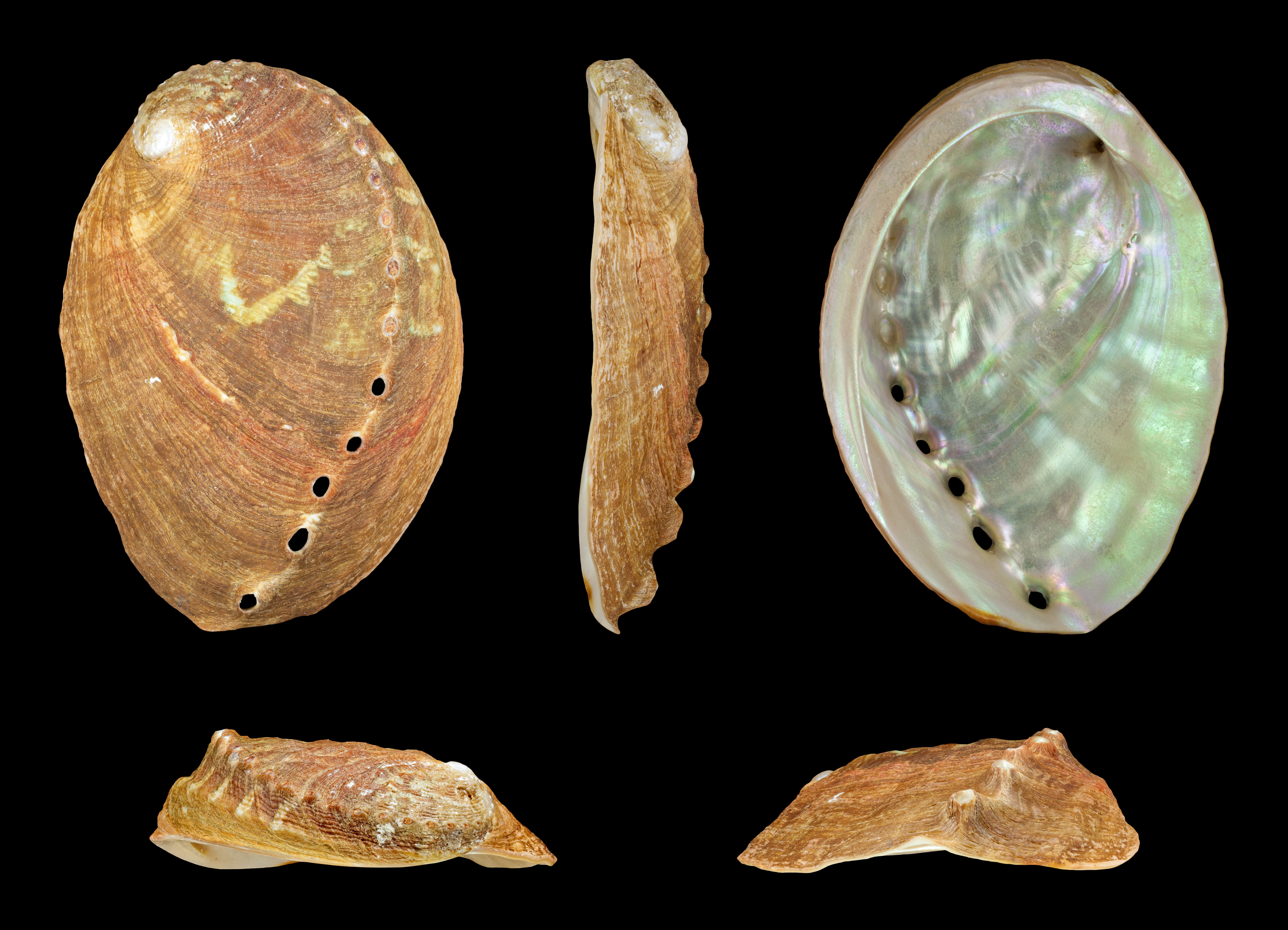
- Shell of Haliotis discus discus
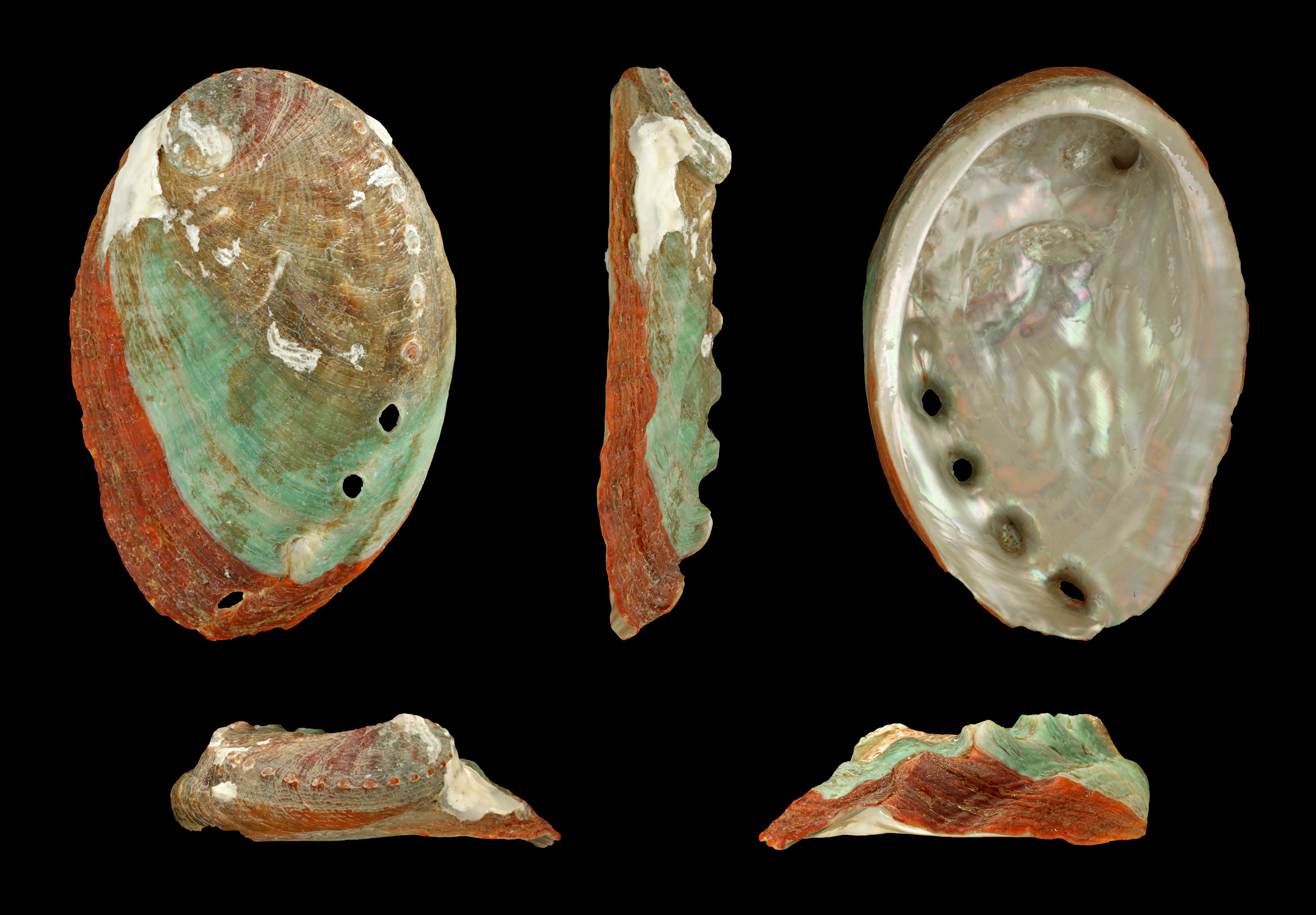
- Shell of Haliotis discus hannai

Conservation status
- Endangered (IUCN 3.1)

Scientific classification
- Kingdom: Animalia
- Phylum: Mollusca
- Class: Gastropoda
- Subclass: Vetigastropoda
- Order: Lepetellida
- Family: Haliotidae
- Genus: Haliotis
- Species: H. discus

Binomial name
- Haliotis discus Reeve, 1846

Subspecies
- Haliotis discus discus Reeve, 1846; Haliotis discus hannai Ino, 1953

= Haliotis discus =

Species of gastropod

Haliotis discus is a species of abalone native to Japan and Korea.

== Taxonomy and subspecies ==
Haliotis discus was described by Lovell Augustus Reeve in 1846. Two subspecies are known:

- Haliotis discus discus Reeve, 1846 – Japan (Honshu, Kyushu, Shikoku) and Korea (Jeju Island)
- Haliotis discus hannai Ino, 1953 – Japan (Hokkaido, Honshu, Kyushu, Shikoku) and Korea

== Distribution and habitat ==
Haliotis discus is native to the shallow subtidal waters off Japan and Korea in the north western Pacific Ocean. H. discus discus typically hides between rocks found at depths of 5–10 m (16–33 ft), sometimes as deep as 30 m (98 ft), in the waters around Jeju Island in Korea and Kyushu, Shikoku, and all but the most north eastern areas of Honshu in Japan. H. discus hannai is typically found in exposed habitats at depths of 1–5 m (3 ft 3 in – 16 ft 5 in) in waters the around Korea and the north eastern coast of Honshu and western coast of Hokkaido in Japan.

== Description ==
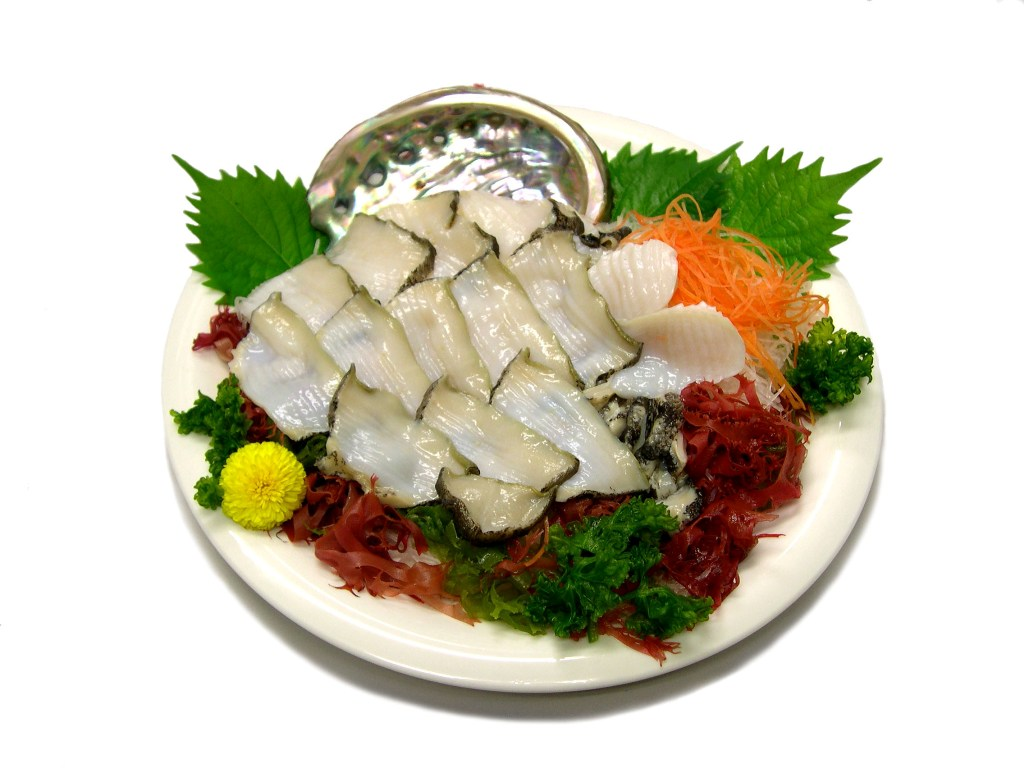
As sashimi

The size of the shell varies between 100 mm and 150 mm. "This species is closely allied in all characters to Haliotis kamtschatkana but is more elongated than the typical Kamtschatkana. The interior surface has a peculiarly metallic luster, light bronze-green and coppery-red predominating."

== Ecology ==
Haliotis discus larvae settle on crust-forming coralline algae and feed on diatoms as they develop, moving out into kelp beds as they near maturity. Primary predators of this species include crabs, starfishes, and octopuses.

In H. discus discus, spawning occurs from October to December. Adults feed on seaweeds such as Eisenia bicyclis, Undaria pinnatifida, and Ecklonia species.
