= Eckstolonol =

Names
- Preferred IUPAC name [1,4]Benzodioxino[2,3-a]oxanthrene-1,3,6,9,11-pentol
- Other names Dioxinodehydroeckol

Identifiers
CAS Number	639514-05-9
3D model (JSmol)	Interactive image
ChEBI	CHEBI:65820
ChEMBL	ChEMBL559870
ChemSpider	8604642
PubChem CID	10429214
UNII	N5P71K0GE3
CompTox Dashboard (EPA)	DTXSID801030416
- InChI: InChI=1S/C18H10O9/c19-6-1-8(21)14-11(3-6)26-17-13(24-14)5-10(23)16-18(17)27-15-9(22)2-7(20)4-12(15)25-16/h1-5,19-23H Key: LBHQACSAGWCMAB-UHFFFAOYSA-N
- SMILES: Oc1cc(O)c2oc3c(oc2c1)c(O)cc1oc2c(O)cc(O)cc2oc31

Properties
Chemical formula	C_{18}H_{10}O_{9}
Molar mass	370.27 g/mol
- Except where otherwise noted, data are given for materials in their standard state (at 25 °C [77 °F], 100 kPa). Infobox references

Eckstolonol is a phlorotannin found in the edible brown algae arame (Eisenia bicyclis) and turuarame (Ecklonia stolonifera).
