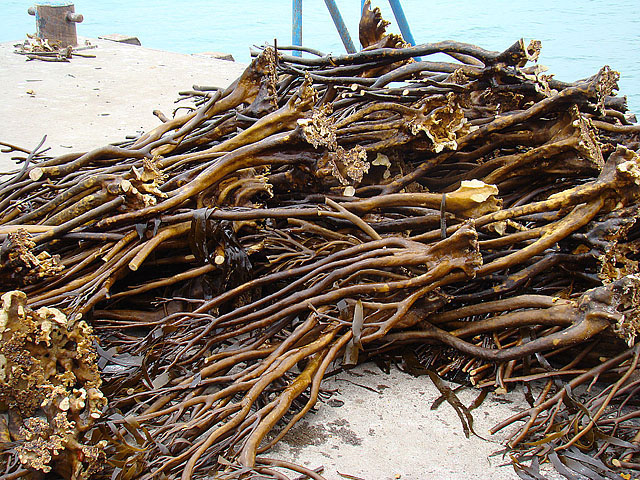

Scientific classification
- Domain: Eukaryota
- Clade: Sar
- Clade: Stramenopiles
- Division: Ochrophyta
- Class: Phaeophyceae
- Order: Laminariales
- Family: Lessoniaceae
- Genus: Lessonia
- Species: L. trabeculata

Binomial name
- Lessonia trabeculata Villouta & Santelices, 1986

= Lessonia trabeculata =

Species of Phaeophyceae

Lessonia trabeculata is a species of kelp, a brown alga in the genus Lessonia. It grows subtidally off the coasts of Peru and northern and central Chile, with the closely related Lessonia nigrescens tending to form a separate zone intertidally. Lessonia trabeculata kelp have gained a great economic importance for alginate production, and its harvest has greatly intensified along the Chilean coast during past two decades

== Description ==
This kelp can grow to a length of 2.5 m (8 ft). It is distinguished from all other members of the genus by the presence of trabeculae (cross struts) in the hollow centres of the blades and stipes (stems), and by the massive and irregular holdfast by which the kelp is attached to the rocks.

== Distribution and habitat ==
Lessonia trabeculata occurs in the southeastern Pacific Ocean, in the subtidal zone off the coasts of Peru and northern and central Chile. Its range extends from Antofagasta to Puerto Montt and its depth range is between 0.5 and 20 m (2 and 66 ft). It forms substantial stands, being found in rocky areas exposed or partially exposed to strong wave action. This species is replaced in the intertidal rocky areas by Lessonia nigrescens, and these two kelps dominate the habitat forming kelp forests. Further south in Chile, Durvillaea antarctica becomes the dominant species of kelp.

== Ecology ==
Lessonia trabeculata grows in areas with strong surges, however it can be torn off the rocks during storms such as those associated with El Niño. It seems to have an annual cycle of growth, with the blade elongating fast during the summer, but growth slowing down in the autumn. It is possible to grow this species in the laboratory, and it may be suitable for aquaculture, with the aim of using it to repair damaged stands of kelp.
