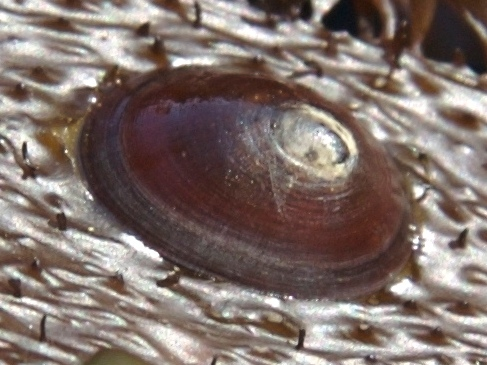
- Discurria insessa living on a stipe of the feather boa kelp, in California

Scientific classification
- Kingdom: Animalia
- Phylum: Mollusca
- Class: Gastropoda
- Subclass: Patellogastropoda
- Family: Lottiidae
- Subfamily: Lottiinae
- Tribe: Lottiini
- Genus: Discurria; Lindberg, 1988

Type species
- Patella insessa Hinds, 1842

= Discurria =

Genus of gastropods

Discurria is a genus of sea snail. A true limpet, it is a marine gastropod mollusk in the family Lottiidae.

== Species ==
Species within the genus Discurria include:

- Discurria insessa (Hinds, 1842)
- Discurria radiata Lindberg, 1988
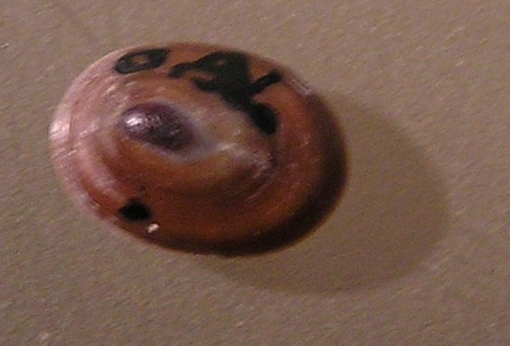
apical view

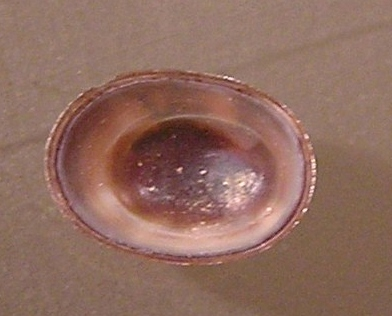
basal view
