= Sodium oligomannate =

Seaweed oligosaccharide claimed to treat Alzheimer's disease

Clinical data
- Other names: Sodium oligo-mannurarate; GV-971; GV971

Legal status
- Legal status: Conditional approval in China; investigational elsewhere

Identifiers
- CAS Number: 2300168-65-2

Sodium oligomannate (development code GV-971) is a mixture of oligosaccharides isolated from the marine algae Ecklonia kurome that is used in China as a treatment for Alzheimer's disease (AD).

It was conditionally approved in China by the National Medical Products Administration in 2019 for mild to moderate AD to improve cognitive function. However, the clinical data supporting its potential benefits have been received skeptically elsewhere and are considered insufficient for approval in other countries. Therefore, it is still undergoing Phase III clinical trials necessary for regulatory approval in the United States and Europe. In 2022, Green Valley Pharmaceuticals, the company conducting Phase III clinical trials for the purpose of obtaining FDA approval in the United States, ended the trials early and suspended further development of the drug.

The mechanism by which sodium oligomannate may function is unclear and several possibilities have been proposed, including amyloid beta disaggregation, mediation of inflammatory responses to amyloid plaques, protein binding inside neurons, and alteration of intestinal bacteria.
