= Badasoop =

South Korean food company

- Native name: 바다숲
- Industry: Food
- Founded: 1980
- Products: Gamtae
- Website: badasoop.co.kr

Badasoop (Korean: 바다숲; RR: Badasup; lit. 'sea forest') is a South Korean food company that specializes in the production of gamtae (Ecklonia cava), a seaweed product similar to nori, with thin, delicate strands.

The company was reportedly founded in 1980. Song Cheol-su (송철수) had settled in Seosan due to the nearby Garorim Bay and its mudflats, which are suited for the growing of gamtae. He became well-versed in the growing and processing of the algae. By 2015, the city designated him a master in gamtae production. Song's daughter Ju-hyeon (송주현) left her job in the software industry to join her father's business; she became the CEO of Badasoop. She set up factories for production. The food was reportedly little known even by the time that Ju-hyeon joined the business. She established industry connections to introduce the product. The product reportedly attracted particular attention from chefs at fine dining restaurants. The company won an award in the 2017 Seoul Food Awards. By 2021, Badasoop's gamtae was being sold internationally, including in Hong Kong, Paris, Australia, and the United States.

According to a 2023 interview with Song Ju-hyeon, the company was working on developing new dishes that incorporated gamtae, including desserts and ready-to-eat meals.
