= 6,6'-Bieckol =

Names
- Preferred IUPAC name 6,6′-Bis(3,5-dihydroxyphenoxy)[1,1′-bioxanthrene]-2,2′,4,4′,7,7′,9,9′-octol

Identifiers
CAS Number	88095-81-2
3D model (JSmol)	Interactive image
ChemSpider	121062
PubChem CID	137388
UNII	87U82W6IFI
CompTox Dashboard (EPA)	DTXSID50236812
- InChI: InChI=1S/C36H22O18/c37-11-1-12(38)4-15(3-11)49-29-21(45)9-23(47)31-35(29)53-27-19(43)7-17(41)25(33(27)51-31)26-18(42)8-20(44)28-34(26)52-32-24(48)10-22(46)30(36(32)54-28)50-16-5-13(39)2-14(40)6-16/h1-10,37-48H Key: HBJNTPFHQKXWOY-UHFFFAOYSA-N; InChI=1/C36H22O18/c37-11-1-12(38)4-15(3-11)49-29-21(45)9-23(47)31-35(29)53-27-19(43)7-17(41)25(33(27)51-31)26-18(42)8-20(44)28-34(26)52-32-24(48)10-22(46)30(36(32)54-28)50-16-5-13(39)2-14(40)6-16/h1-10,37-48H Key: HBJNTPFHQKXWOY-UHFFFAOYAE
- SMILES: C1=C(C=C(C=C1O)OC2=C(C=C(C3=C2OC4=C(C=C(C(=C4O3)C5=C6C(=C(C=C5O)O)OC7=C(O6)C(=CC(=C7OC8=CC(=CC(=C8)O)O)O)O)O)O)O)O)O

Properties
Chemical formula	C_{36}H_{22}O_{18}
Molar mass	742.55 g/mol
- Except where otherwise noted, data are given for materials in their standard state (at 25 °C [77 °F], 100 kPa). Infobox references

6,6'-Bieckol is an eckol-type phlorotannin found in the brown algae Ecklonia cava and Ecklonia stolonifera.
