= 8,8′-Bieckol =

Names
- Preferred IUPAC name 9,9′-Bis(3,5-dihydroxyphenoxy)[2,2′-bioxanthrene]-1,1′,3,3′,6,6′,8,8′-octol

Identifiers
CAS Number	89445-12-5
3D model (JSmol)	Interactive image
ChemSpider	2278310
PubChem CID	3008867
UNII	7J2CFB3NBV
CompTox Dashboard (EPA)	DTXSID20237710
- InChI: InChI=1S/C36H22O18/c37-11-1-12(38)4-15(3-11)49-29-19(43)7-21(45)31-35(29)53-33-23(51-31)9-17(41)25(27(33)47)26-18(42)10-24-34(28(26)48)54-36-30(20(44)8-22(46)32(36)52-24)50-16-5-13(39)2-14(40)6-16/h1-10,37-48H Key: FHYNTHBAMAEFJB-UHFFFAOYSA-N; InChI=1/C36H22O18/c37-11-1-12(38)4-15(3-11)49-29-19(43)7-21(45)31-35(29)53-33-23(51-31)9-17(41)25(27(33)47)26-18(42)10-24-34(28(26)48)54-36-30(20(44)8-22(46)32(36)52-24)50-16-5-13(39)2-14(40)6-16/h1-10,37-48H Key: FHYNTHBAMAEFJB-UHFFFAOYAK
- SMILES: C1=C(C=C(C=C1O)OC2=C(C=C(C3=C2OC4=C(C(=C(C=C4O3)O)C5=C(C=C6C(=C5O)OC7=C(O6)C(=CC(=C7OC8=CC(=CC(=C8)O)O)O)O)O)O)O)O)O

Properties
Chemical formula	C_{36}H_{22}O_{18}
Molar mass	742.554 g·mol^{−1}
- Except where otherwise noted, data are given for materials in their standard state (at 25 °C [77 °F], 100 kPa). Infobox references

8,8'-Bieckol is an eckol-type phlorotannin found in the brown algae Ecklonia cava and Ecklonia kurome.
