= Fucosterol =

Names
- IUPAC name [24(24^{1})E]-Stigmasta-5,24(24^{1})-dien-3β-ol
- Systematic IUPAC name (1R,3aS,3bS,7S,9aR,9bS,11aR)-9a,11a-Dimethyl-1-[(2R,5E)-5-(propan-2-yl)hept-5-en-2-yl]-2,3,3a,3b,4,6,7,8,9,9a,9b,10,11,11a-tetradecahydro-1H-cyclopenta[a]phenanthren-7-ol

Identifiers
CAS Number	17605-67-3
3D model (JSmol)	Interactive image
ChEBI	CHEBI:27865
ChemSpider	4444705
KEGG	C08817
MeSH	C015896
PubChem CID	5281328
UNII	504ZAM710C
CompTox Dashboard (EPA)	DTXSID701033229
- InChI: InChI=1S/C29H48O/c1-7-21(19(2)3)9-8-20(4)25-12-13-26-24-11-10-22-18-23(30)14-16-28(22,5)27(24)15-17-29(25,26)6/h7,10,19-20,23-27,30H,8-9,11-18H2,1-6H3/b21-7+/t20-,23+,24+,25-,26+,27+,28+,29-/m1/s1 Key: OSELKOCHBMDKEJ-JUGJNGJRSA-N; InChI=1/C29H48O/c1-7-21(19(2)3)9-8-20(4)25-12-13-26-24-11-10-22-18-23(30)14-16-28(22,5)27(24)15-17-29(25,26)6/h7,10,19-20,23-27,30H,8-9,11-18H2,1-6H3/b21-7+/t20-,23+,24+,25-,26+,27+,28+,29-/m1/s1 Key: OSELKOCHBMDKEJ-JUGJNGJRBM
- SMILES: C/C=C(\CC[C@@H](C)[C@H]1CC[C@@H]2[C@@]1(CC[C@H]3[C@H]2CC=C4[C@@]3(CC[C@@H](C4)O)C)C)/C(C)C

Properties
Chemical formula	C_{29}H_{48}O
Molar mass	412.702 g·mol^{−1}
- Except where otherwise noted, data are given for materials in their standard state (at 25 °C [77 °F], 100 kPa). Infobox references

Fucosterol is a sterol isolated from algae such as Ecklonia cava or Ecklonia stolonifera.
