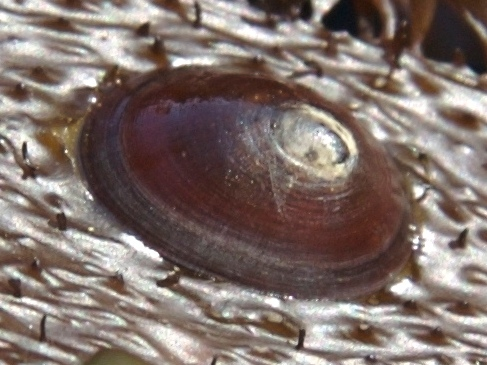
- Discurria insessa living on a stipe of the feather boa kelp, in California

Scientific classification
- Domain: Eukaryota
- Kingdom: Animalia
- Phylum: Mollusca
- Class: Gastropoda
- Subclass: Patellogastropoda
- Family: Lottiidae
- Genus: Discurria
- Species: D. insessa

Binomial name
- Discurria insessa (Hinds, 1842)

Synonyms
- Lottia insessa

= Discurria insessa =

Species of gastropod

Discurria insessa, commonly named the seaweed limpet, is a species of sea snail, a true limpet, a marine gastropod mollusc in the family Lottiidae.

== Description ==
The size of the shell varies between 10 mm and 38 mm. The apex of the shell is located at the highest point of the shell and slightly forward at the center. The shape of the Discurria insessa are nearly oval or can be elongated with the right and left margins of the shell nearly parallel to the distance. The height of the limpet is about 3/4 width. The exterior of the shell is dark brown and usually smooth.

== Distribution ==
This marine species occurs from South Alaska to the Baja California Peninsula. The geograpichal range of Disccuria inessa is Wranglell Island, Alaska, to Bahía Magdalena, Baja California Sur. Disccuria inessa was abundant in North California but rare north in Oregon.

== Ecology ==
Discurria insessa is believed to live only on Egregia menziesii (feather boa kelp). Young limpets seem to orient randomly on the stipe but adults are almost always oriented longitudinally along the stipe. D. insessa feed both on epiphytes and on the Egregia itself. D. insessa spawns mainly in spring and summer. There is high mortality during the winter—the largest individuals are usually not more than 1 year old. Larvae settle preferentially on large, crowded, post-reproductive Egregia and on fronds which already have adults. They grow fastest if they settle on scars made by older limpets. This species runs away quickly if it contacts a seastar such as Pisaster ochraceus.
