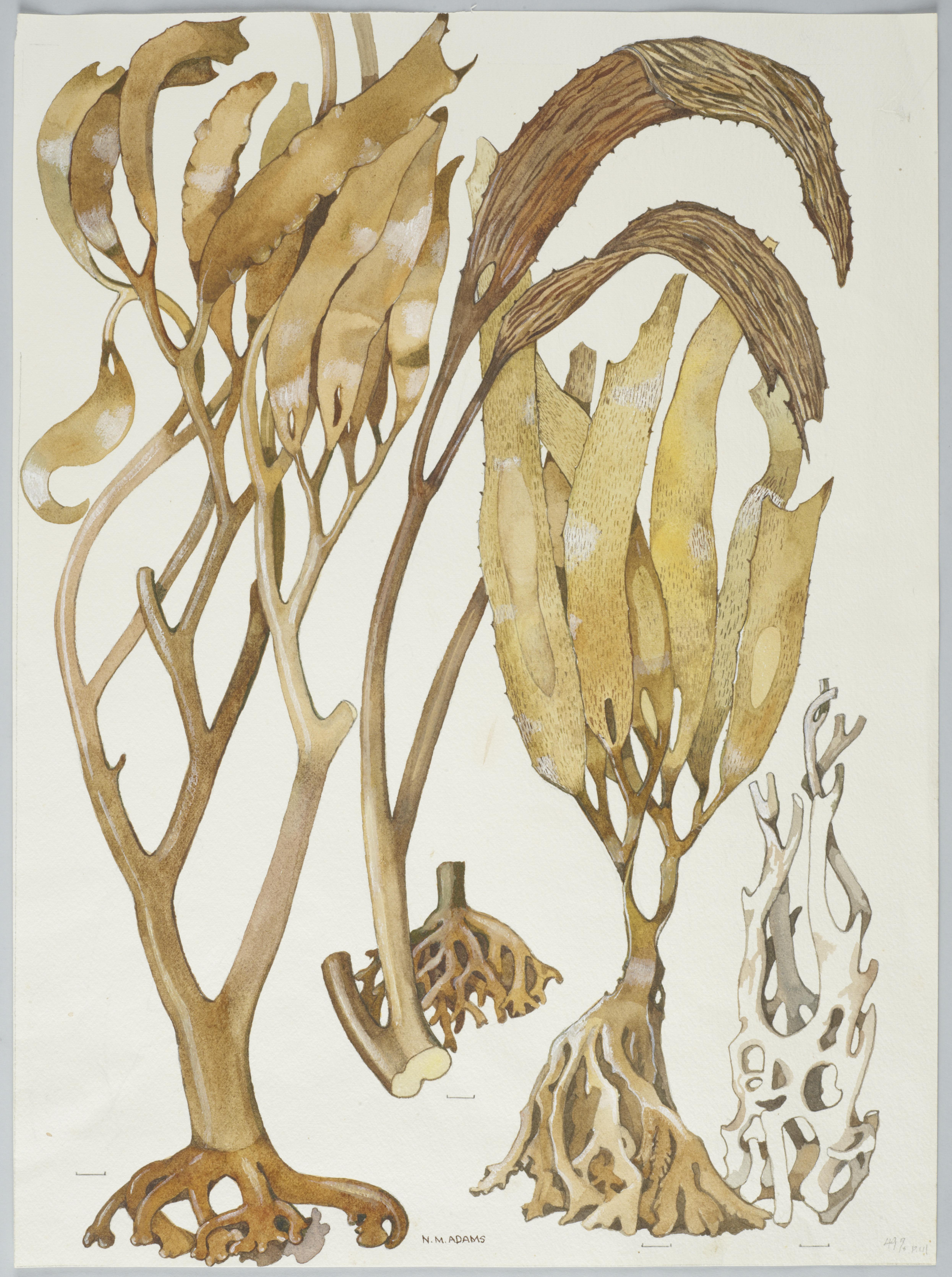
- Lessonia brevifolia

Scientific classification
- Domain: Eukaryota
- Supergroup: Stramenopiles
- Division: Ochrophyta
- Class: Phaeophyceae
- Order: Laminariales
- Family: Lessoniaceae
- Genus: Lessonia; Bory de Saint-Vincent, 1825

Species
- See text

= Lessonia (alga) =

Genus of seaweeds

Lessonia is a genus of large kelp native to the southern Pacific Ocean. It is the only kelp to be restricted to the southern hemisphere and is primarily distributed along the coasts of South America, New Zealand, Tasmania, and the Antarctic islands. Lessonia is one of two principal genera in kelp forests (the other is Macrocystis).

In Chile, the preservation of Lessonia kelp is an important to help preserve the biodiversity that exists on rocky shores. By studying the harvesting of these wild populations of Lessonia kelp marine biologists are able to analyze the effects of this activity on wildlife. Some species are of economic importance, such as Lessonia nigrescens, which is harvested for alginate.

They use a variety of chemical defenses and are somewhat resistant to algivory. The zoospores are known to produce sporophytes even when ingested by fish.

The conservation status of the genus has not been extensively researched. Only two species of Lessonia, L. oreas and L. rufa, have been assessed by the IUCN. Both of which have been marked "least concern."

== Taxonomy ==
The genus was first described by Jean Baptiste Bory de Saint-Vincent in 1825. The genus name of Lessonia is in honour of René Primevère Lesson (1794–1849), who was a French surgeon, naturalist, ornithologist, and herpetologist. The holotype for this genus is L. flavicans. Recent studies have provided evidence of cryptic speciation within Lessonia including L. nigrescens in Chile and L. variegata in New Zealand. Lessonia is the type genus for the Lessoniaceae family.

Species of Lessonia have been conflated and combined, over time, including by Bory himself, who described L. flavicans once by that name, and once by the name of L. fusceseens. The former species L. laminarioides was moved to a new but related genus in 2006, Psuedolessonia. Another species, L. vadosa, was proposed, but incorporated into L. flavicans. Other species proposed for this genus have been incorporated into Ascoseira, Himantothallus, Myriodesma, and Laminaria.

Three species, L. media, L. meridionalis, and L. septentrionalis, were accepted in 2024.

== Chimerism ==
Several species of Lessonia are known to experience chimerism, which is when two distinct organisms fuse together to generate a new organism. Organisms that undergo chimerism will have several genomes in one body. The benefits to chimerism include an increase in body size and genetic diversity, increasing survival rates. The main cost to this would be the chance of competition between genomes.

L. berteroana and L. spicata are both known to undergo chimerism.

Only the holdfast experienced genetic mixing, with the stipes each remaining genetically homogenous.

== Morphology ==
Species of Lessonia are very difficult to identify based on morphological characteristics, as the kelp are very plastic. The blades may be flat and elongated, broad, or narrow, with a smooth, ruguse, or wavy surface and can have smooth or jagged edges. A big factor in the morphology is the wave exposure, as Lessonia is found across a variety of habitats.

== Harvesting ==
=== Chile ===
Lessonia was used as fuel in the Atacama Desert c.3050 BC.

Chile is the world's largest producer of wild-harvested algae, with Lessonia from Chile making up 29% of global exports.

Chile produces over 300,000 dry tons of seaweed per year, with more than 11,000 people are employed in the industry, and almost all of it Lessonia. Almost all seaweed harvesting happens in the desert reason of Chile (18 to 32 degrees), as the climate is more suitable for drying.

Commercial brown seaweed landings started in the 1960s in Chile, but they are only included in national statistics since the 1980s. Since 2000, kelp harvesting has increased, due to an increased market demand and a decrease in the value of copper, which is the resource that makes up 60% of the Chilean GDP. In 2005, a fishing ban was enacted between 18 and 26 degrees due to concerns about over harvesting, although some studies have indicated that there are no substantial differences between the harvested and unharvested populations. L. nigresscens landings increased between 2005 and 2010, but the algal population remained strong.

The Chilean seaweed corporate industry are not allowed to harvest seaweed themselves. Instead, they must purchase biomass from artisanal fishers. This means that seaweed regulations are regulated by a combination of fishers, industry, authorities, and scientists.

The other main algae harvested in Chile, L. trabeculata, is harvested by semi-autonomous divers who do not follow harvesting recommendations, causing the population to suffer.

=== Elsewhere ===
Despite New Zealand being home to six species of Lessonia, the most of any country, Lessonia harvesting is almost nonexistent. Algal cultivation has been studied in New Zealand, but rarely implemented.

Several Lessonia species grow in Argentina, but the situation is similar there, with very little algae cultivation or harvesting. Part of this may be due to very little public knowledge about the option.

Extensive commercial seaweed farming is done in Australia, but mostly using Asparagopsis species.

Tasmania cultivated a wide variety of algae, including L. corrugata (referred to as Tasmanian Kombu). This is done with both long-line and land-based aquaculture.

Peru harvests L. trabeculata, which it esports to china for processing.

== Species ==
- Lessonia adamsiae
- Lessonia berteroana
- Lessonia brevifolia
- Lessonia ciliata
- Lessonia corrugata
- Lessonia flavicans
- Lessonia media
- Lessonia meridionalis
- Lessonia nigrescens
- Lessonia searlesiana
- Lessonia septentrionalis
- Lessonia spicata
- Lessonia tholiformis
- Lessonia trabeculata
- Lessonia variegata
