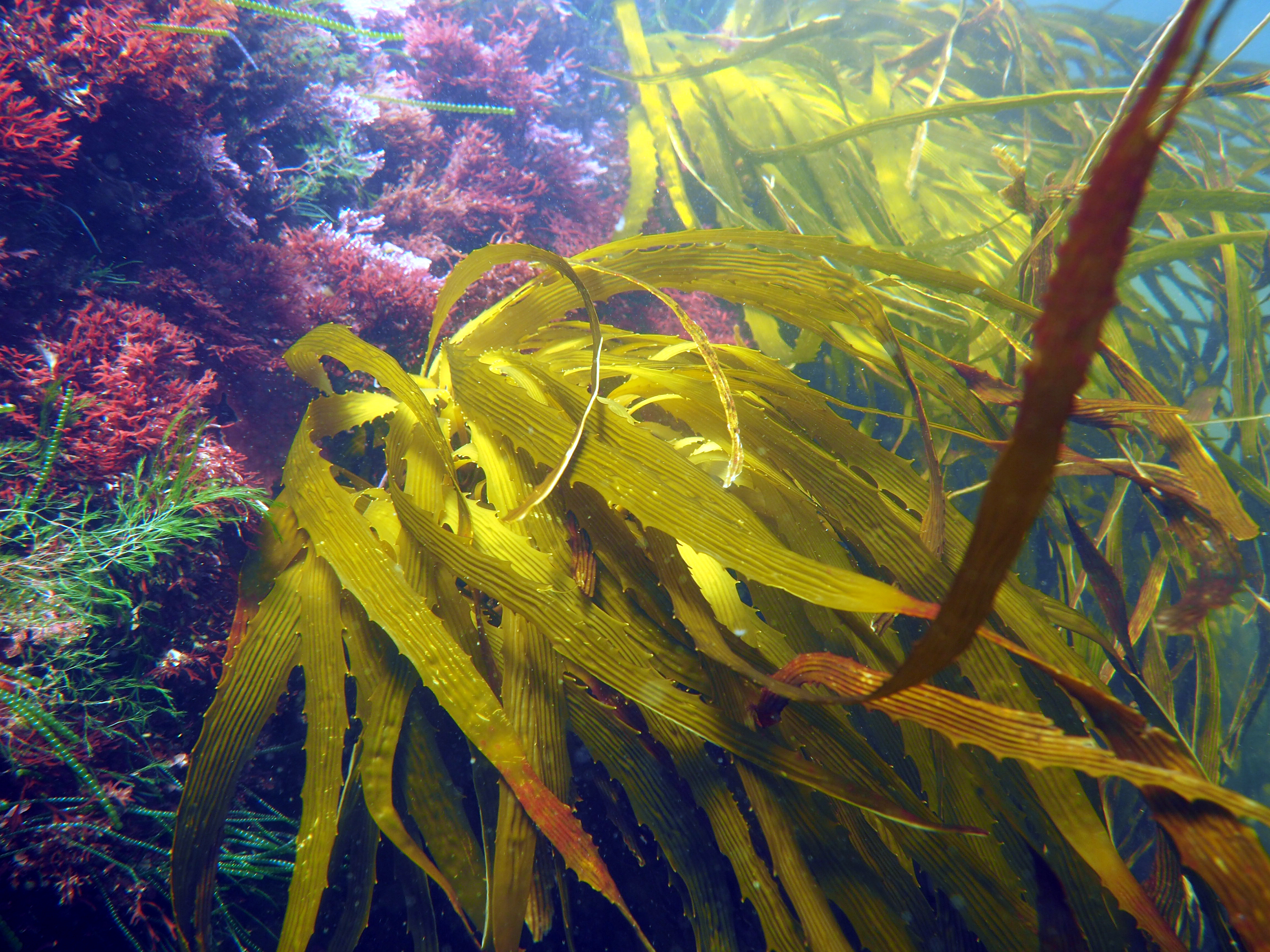
- Lessonia corrugata

Scientific classification
- Domain: Eukaryota
- Clade: Sar
- Clade: Stramenopiles
- Phylum: Ochrophyta
- Class: Phaeophyceae
- Order: Laminariales
- Family: Lessoniaceae
- Genus: Lessonia
- Species: L. corrugata

Binomial name
- Lessonia corrugata Lucas, 1931

= Lessonia corrugata =

Species of seaweed

Lessonia corrugata is a species of kelp, a brown algae in the genus Lessonia, commonly known as strapweed, common crapweed, or Tasmanian kombu. It is a subtidal species endemic to Tasmania and southern Victoria, Australia, and is the least studied of the only three Laminarian kelps in the region. The species was first described by Arthur Henry Shakespeare Lucas in 1931, and is most closely related to the New Zealand species Lessonia variegata.

Lessonia corrugata is a dominant species in some Tasmanian kelp forests, but remains poorly studied. It is currently being developed for use in aquaculture, to produce food, feed, kelp biomass, and for environmental remediation purposes in IMTA finfish farms. However, it has also been identified as highly vulnerable to ocean warming.

== Description ==
Lessonia corrugata is a large, brown macroalgae that averages 1.5 m (0.5 ft) in length. It is characterised by distinct longitudinal corrugations on its blades that give the kelp its name. These blades arise from the holdfast via basal splitting and become long and linear as they grow. The blades lack pneumatocysts, meaning that the kelp is negatively buoyant and displays a prostrate growth form, lying flat across the substrate.

Like all Laminarian kelps, the life cycle of L. corrugata is a heteromorphic alteration of generations between microscopic gametophyte and macroscopic sporophyte life stages. L. corrugata reproduces from linear sori of sporangia and paraphyses located within the concavities of the corrugations on the blades.

== Ecology ==
Lessonia corrugata grows in areas of moderate to strong water movement. It is typically found at depths of 1–4 m, but has been recorded as deep as 18–20 m at some sites. It generally occurs in shallower and more exposed locations than other dominant canopy-forming seaweed species in the region, namely Ecklonia radiata and Phyllospora comosa.

L. corrugata is restricted to a narrow temperature range, making it particularly sensitive to threats such as rising sea surface temperatures. Juveniles have a thermal optimum of ~16˚C, and an upper thermal limit of 23˚C. Likewise, the optimal temperature range for growth and sexual development of L. corrugata gametophytes is narrow, between 15.7 and 17.9˚C. Coupled with its small geographic range, this thermal sensitivity may impact the recruitment and long-term survival of L. corrugata, with peak summer sea surface temperatures projected to regularly exceed L. corrugata's thermal limit by 2050.

== Aquaculture ==
Lessonia corrugata is currently being developed as a potential species for aquaculture production, but knowledge gaps remain about the fundamental biology and cultivation needs of the species. Nonetheless, improvements are being made, with novel cultivation techniques that use increased water motion in the nursery potentially improving juvenile sporophyte growth and also increasing biomass production at sea. Likewise, trials have found spring to be the best season for out-planting L. corrugata, and that growth is best at a depth of 3–5 m. Nonetheless, the vulnerability of L. corrugata to ocean warming may ultimately limit its viability for seaweed farming.

== See also ==
- List of seaweeds and marine flowering plants of Australia (temperate waters)
