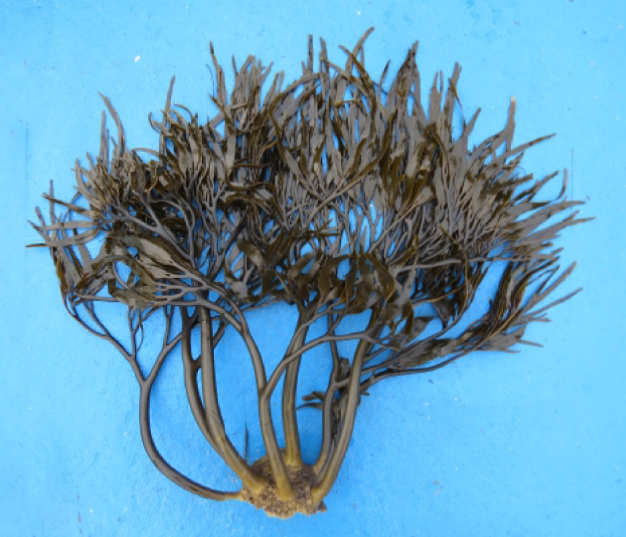

Scientific classification
- Domain: Eukaryota
- Clade: Sar
- Clade: Stramenopiles
- Division: Ochrophyta
- Class: Phaeophyceae
- Order: Laminariales
- Family: Lessoniaceae
- Genus: Lessonia
- Species: L. spicata

Binomial name
- Lessonia spicata (Suhr) Santelices, 2012

= Lessonia spicata =

Species of algae

Lessonia spicata is a species of brown algae in the family Lessoniaceae. It is found on the rocky shores of the central and southern coasts of Chile. There it is commonly referred to as huiro negro.
