= Eisenin =

Tripeptide with immunological activity

Names
- IUPAC name (2S)-2-[[(2S)-5-amino-5-oxo-2-[[(2S)-5-oxopyrrolidine-2-carbonyl]amino]pentanoyl]amino]propanoic acid
- Other names Pyr-Gln-Ala-OH

Identifiers
CAS Number	21477-57-6
3D model (JSmol)	Interactive image; Interactive image
ChemSpider	5731099
PubChem CID	7408402
CompTox Dashboard (EPA)	DTXSID80902331
- InChI: InChI=1S/C13H20N4O6/c1-6(13(22)23)15-11(20)8(2-4-9(14)18)17-12(21)7-3-5-10(19)16-7/h6-8H,2-5H2,1H3,(H2,14,18)(H,15,20)(H,16,19)(H,17,21)(H,22,23) Key: VIPNGHPLCAMVEB-UHFFFAOYSA-N; InChI=1S/C13H20N4O6/c1-6(13(22)23)15-11(20)8(2-4-9(14)18)17-12(21)7-3-5-10(19)16-7/h6-8H,2-5H2,1H3,(H2,14,18)(H,15,20)(H,16,19)(H,17,21)(H,22,23)/t6-,7-,8-/m0/s1 Key: VIPNGHPLCAMVEB-FXQIFTODSA-N
- SMILES: CC(C(=O)O)NC(=O)C(CCC(=O)N)NC(=O)C1CCC(=O)N1; C[C@H](NC(=O)[C@H](CCC(N)=O)NC(=O)[C@@H]1CCC(=O)N1)C(=O)O

Properties
Chemical formula	C_{13}H_{20}N_{4}O_{6}
Molar mass	328.325 g·mol^{−1}
- Except where otherwise noted, data are given for materials in their standard state (at 25 °C [77 °F], 100 kPa). Infobox references

Eisenin (C_{13}H_{20}N_{4}O_{6}) is a tripeptide isolated from the brown marine algae Eisenia bicyclis. It has immunological activity by augmenting natural cytotoxicity of peripheral blood lymphocytes (PBLs) in humans.

It can be synthesized by a tripeptide precursor known as y-methyl-l-glutamyl-y-methyl-l-glutamyl-l-alanine and an amide. This is done by the crystallization of the N-terminal of the y-methyl ester and the simultaneous amidation of the internal L-glutamic acid by ammonia.
