= Lessonia flavicans =

Scientific classification
- Domain: Eukaryota
- Clade: Sar
- Clade: Stramenopiles
- Division: Ochrophyta
- Class: Phaeophyceae
- Order: Laminariales
- Family: Lessoniaceae
- Genus: Lessonia
- Species: L. flavicans

Binomial name
- Lessonia flavicans Bory de Saint-Vincent, 1825

Species of seaweed

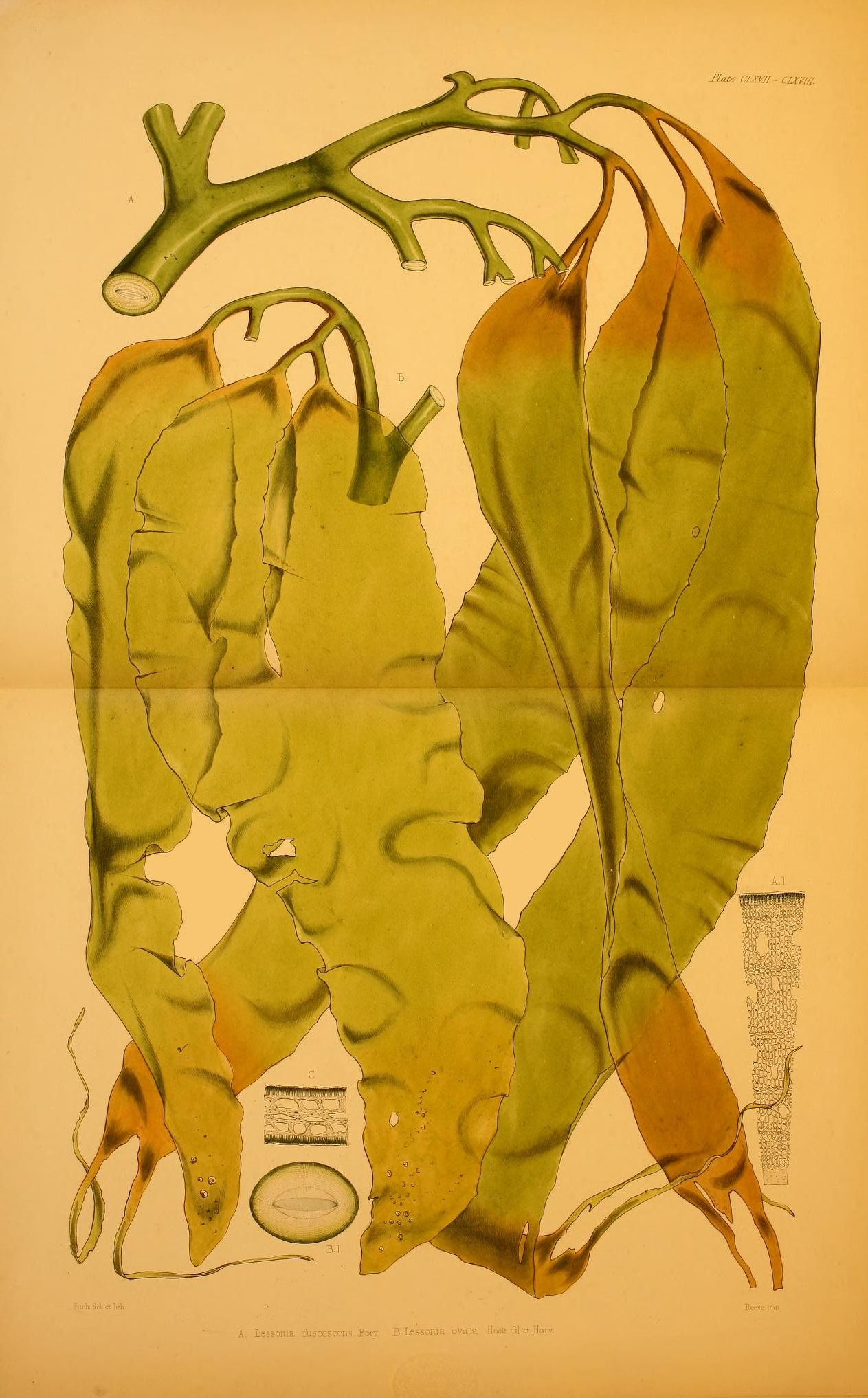
Botanical illustration of *Lessonia* from Hooker's *Flora Antarctica*

Lessonia flavicans is a species of kelp in the genus Lessonia, native to the shallow seas off the far south of South America and the Falkland Islands. It is the only alga to have the form of a tree, having a stem up to 20 cm (7.9 in) thick and up to 3 m (9.8 ft) tall, topped by dichotomous clusters of flaccid fronds each up to a metre long, and bringing the total height to 4 m (13 ft).
