= Eckol =

- Chemical structure of eckol

Names
- Preferred IUPAC name 4-(3,5-Dihydroxyphenoxy)oxanthrene-1,3,6,8-tetrol
- Other names 1-(3,5-Dihydroxyphenoxy)-2,4,7,9-tetrahydroxydibenzo-1,4-dioxin

Identifiers
CAS Number	88798-74-7
3D model (JSmol)	Interactive image
ChEBI	CHEBI:65819
ChEMBL	ChEMBL471187
ChemSpider	128740
PubChem CID	145937
UNII	4A5E8354UB
CompTox Dashboard (EPA)	DTXSID40237333
- InChI: InChI=1S/C18H12O9/c19-7-1-8(20)3-10(2-7)25-16-12(23)6-13(24)17-18(16)27-15-11(22)4-9(21)5-14(15)26-17/h1-6,19-24H Key: PCZZRBGISTUIOA-UHFFFAOYSA-N; InChI=1/C18H12O9/c19-7-1-8(20)3-10(2-7)25-16-12(23)6-13(24)17-18(16)27-15-11(22)4-9(21)5-14(15)26-17/h1-6,19-24H Key: PCZZRBGISTUIOA-UHFFFAOYAJ
- SMILES: C1=C(C=C(C=C1O)OC2=C(C=C(C3=C2OC4=C(C=C(C=C4O3)O)O)O)O)O

Properties
Chemical formula	C_{18}H_{12}O_{9}
Molar mass	372.285 g·mol^{−1}
- Except where otherwise noted, data are given for materials in their standard state (at 25 °C [77 °F], 100 kPa). verify (what is ?) Infobox references

Eckol is a phlorotannin isolated from brown algae in the family Lessoniaceae such as species in the genus Ecklonia such as E. cava or E. kurome or in the genus Eisenia such as Eisenia bicyclis.

The molecule possesses a dibenzo-p-dioxin skeleton and a phloroglucinol component. The molecule can also be viewed as a phloroglucinol trimer.

It exhibits an antiplasmin inhibitory effect and a radioprotective effect in a mouse model. It also exhibits an in vitro cytoprotective effect against oxidative stress in Chinese hamster lung fibroblasts. It also shows antithrombotic and profibrinolytic activities.
