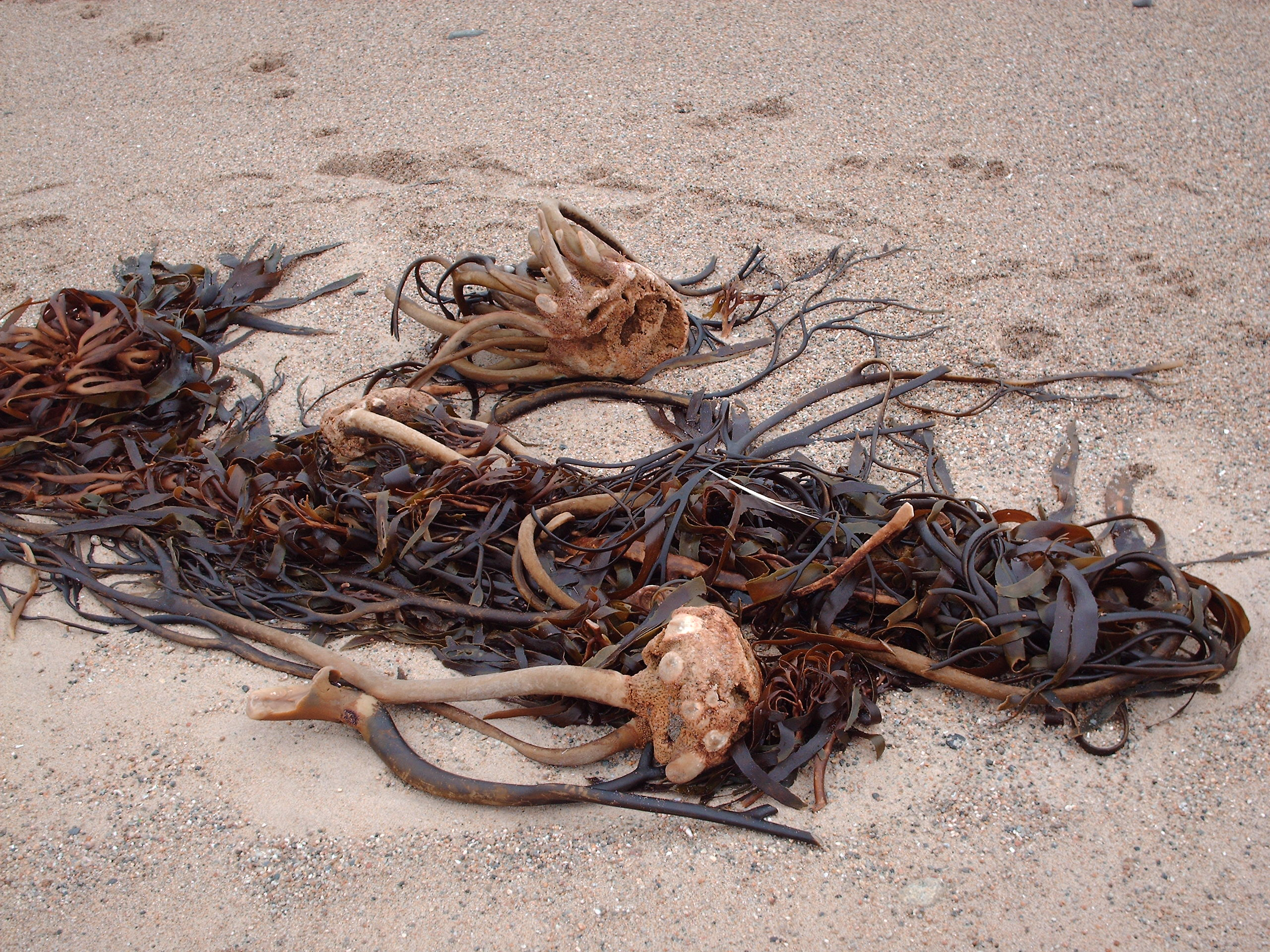
- Lessonia nigrescens at El Quisco beach, Chile

Scientific classification
- Domain: Eukaryota
- Clade: Diaphoretickes
- Clade: SAR
- Clade: Stramenopiles
- Phylum: Gyrista
- Subphylum: Ochrophytina
- Class: Phaeophyceae
- Order: Laminariales
- Family: Lessoniaceae
- Genus: Lessonia
- Species: L. nigrescens

Binomial name
- Lessonia nigrescens Bory de Saint-Vincent, 1826

= Lessonia nigrescens =

Species of seaweed

Lessonia nigrescens, the grey weed or giant grey weed, is a South American kelp species in the genus Lessonia.

There is at least two populations of the seaweed, marked by the difference in phenolic content. There is a subtidal population with higher phenol content and an intertidal population with a lighter phenol content. The difference in the phenolic content can be explained by the herbivory selection pressure due to the sea snail Tegula tridentata.

UV treatment induces the production of phlorotannins that accumulate in physodes.

This weed contains the phytosterol saringosterol that shows an inhibitory effect on Mycobacterium tuberculosis growth.

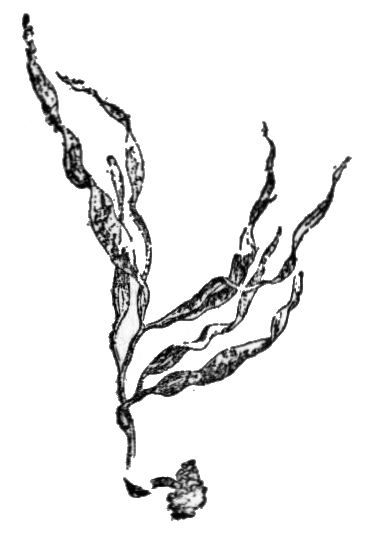
Illustration from "Nordisk familjebok".
