= Saringosterol =

Identifiers
CAS Number	6901-60-6
3D model (JSmol)	Interactive image
ChEMBL	ChEMBL252366
ChemSpider	24682471
PubChem CID	14161394
CompTox Dashboard (EPA)	DTXSID001045582
- InChI: InChI=1S/C29H48O2/c1-7-29(31,19(2)3)17-12-20(4)24-10-11-25-23-9-8-21-18-22(30)13-15-27(21,5)26(23)14-16-28(24,25)6/h7-8,19-20,22-26,30-31H,1,9-18H2,2-6H3/t20-,22+,23+,24-,25+,26+,27+,28-,29?/m1/s1 Key: OPGVEUGCNGNPSX-SVSQYMGHSA-N; InChI=1/C29H48O2/c1-7-29(31,19(2)3)17-12-20(4)24-10-11-25-23-9-8-21-18-22(30)13-15-27(21,5)26(23)14-16-28(24,25)6/h7-8,19-20,22-26,30-31H,1,9-18H2,2-6H3/t20-,22+,23+,24-,25+,26+,27+,28-,29?/m1/s1 Key: OPGVEUGCNGNPSX-SVSQYMGHBO
- SMILES: C[C@H](CCC(C=C)(C(C)C)O)[C@H]1CC[C@@H]2[C@@]1(CC[C@H]3[C@H]2CC=C4[C@@]3(CC[C@@H](C4)O)C)C

Properties
Chemical formula	C_{29}H_{48}O_{2}
Molar mass	428.701 g·mol^{−1}
- Except where otherwise noted, data are given for materials in their standard state (at 25 °C [77 °F], 100 kPa). Infobox references

Saringosterol is an isolate of Lessonia nigrescens that has activity against Mycobacterium tuberculosis.
