= Lead citrate =

Compound of Lead

Names
- IUPAC name 2-hydroxypropane-1,2,3-tricarboxylate; lead(2+); trihydrate
- Other names Lead citrate trihydrate

Identifiers
CAS Number	14450-60-3; trihydrate: 512-26-5
3D model (JSmol)	Interactive image; trihydrate: Interactive image
ChemSpider	140452
ECHA InfoCard	100.007.402
EC Number	208-141-1
PubChem CID	159739
UNII	D3C763S76D
CompTox Dashboard (EPA)	DTXSID70889425
- InChI: InChI=1S/2C6H8O7.3Pb/c2*7-3(8)1-6(13,5(11)12)2-4(9)10;;;/h2*13H,1-2H2,(H,7,8)(H,9,10)(H,11,12);;;/q;;3*+2/p-6 Key: HOQPTLCRWVZIQZ-UHFFFAOYSA-H
- SMILES: C(C(=O)[O-])C(CC(=O)[O-])(C(=O)[O-])O.C(C(=O)[O-])C(CC(=O)[O-])(C(=O)[O-])O.[Pb+2].[Pb+2].[Pb+2]; trihydrate: C(C(=O)[O-])C(CC(=O)[O-])(C(=O)[O-])O.C(C(=O)[O-])C(CC(=O)[O-])(C(=O)[O-])O.O.O.O.[Pb+2].[Pb+2].[Pb+2]

Properties
Chemical formula	C_{12}H_{10}O_{14}Pb_{3}
Molar mass	999.8 g·mol^{−1}
Appearance	White odorless powder or crystals
Density	4.63 g/cm^{3}
Boiling point	309.6 °C (589.3 °F; 582.8 K)
Solubility in water	Soluble in water, slightly soluble in alcohol

Hazards
- GHS labelling
Pictograms	(GHS07: Exclamation mark) (GHS08: Health hazard) (GHS09: Environmental hazard)
Signal word	Danger
Hazard statements	H302, H332, H360, H373, H410
Precautionary statements	P201, P202, P260, P264, P270, P271, P273, P281, P301+P312, P304+P312, P304+P340, P308+P313, P312, P314, P330, P391, P405, P501
- Except where otherwise noted, data are given for materials in their standard state (at 25 °C [77 °F], 100 kPa). Infobox references

Lead citrate is a compound of lead and citrate that is primarily used as an enhancer for heavy metal staining in electron microscopy. This salt binds to osmium and uranyl acetate and enhances contrast in many cellular structures. Lead citrate is highly reactive with carbon dioxide.
