= Ecklonia kurome =

Scientific classification
- Domain: Eukaryota
- Clade: Diaphoretickes
- Clade: SAR
- Clade: Stramenopiles
- Phylum: Gyrista
- Subphylum: Ochrophytina
- Class: Phaeophyceae
- Order: Laminariales
- Family: Lessoniaceae
- Genus: Ecklonia
- Species: E. kurome

Binomial name
- Ecklonia kurome Okamura, 1927

Forms
- Ecklonia kurome f. contorta Okamura 1936; Ecklonia kurome f. plana Okamura 1936; Ecklonia kurome f. latissima Okamura 1936

Species of seaweed

Ecklonia kurome (Japanese: 黑布 (kurome), Chinese: 鹅掌菜) is a brown alga species in the genus Ecklonia found in the Sea of Japan.

The phlorotannins eckol, phlorofucofuroeckol A and 8,8'-bieckol can be found in Ecklonia kurome.

An oligosaccharide extract from Ecklonia kurome called GV-971 is approved in China for the treatment of Alzheimer's disease, but the evidence is highly dubious.

== See also ==
- Kombu
