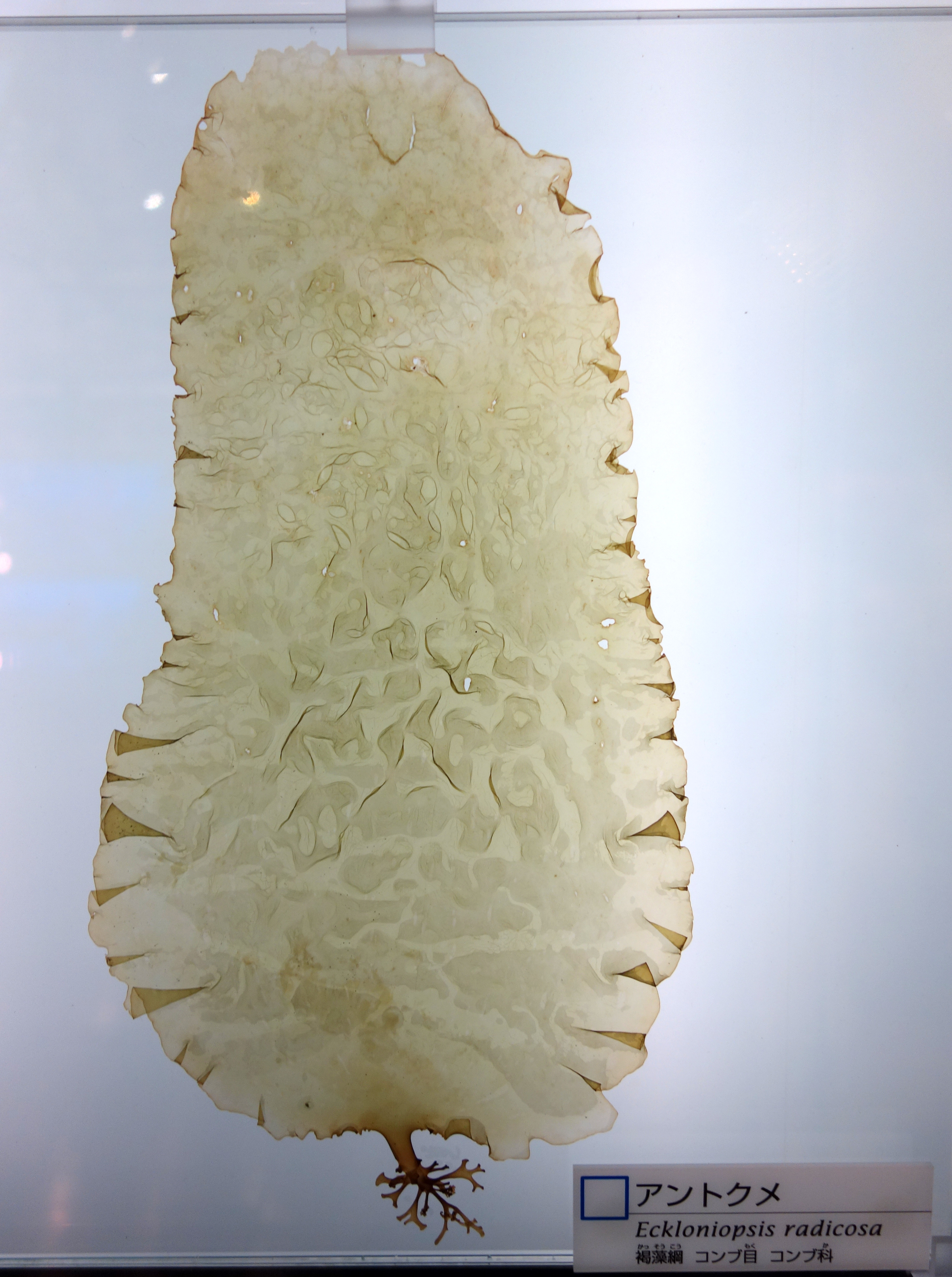
- Eckloniopsis radicosa

Scientific classification
- Domain: Eukaryota
- Clade: Diaphoretickes
- Clade: SAR
- Clade: Stramenopiles
- Phylum: Gyrista
- Subphylum: Ochrophytina
- Class: Phaeophyceae
- Order: Laminariales
- Family: Lessoniaceae; Setchell & Gardner, 1925

Genera
- Ecklonia; Eckloniopsis; Egregia; Eisenia; Lessonia

= Lessoniaceae =

Family of seaweeds

Lessoniaceae are a family of kelp. Species of this family have a transition zone with the intercalary meristem subdivided so that there are a number of secondary stipes in addition to the primary stipe.

== Genera and species ==
- Ecklonia
  - Ecklonia arborea
  - Ecklonia cava
  - Ecklonia kurome
  - Ecklonia maxima
  - Ecklonia radiata
  - Ecklonia stolonifera
- Eckloniopsis
  - Eckloniopsis radicosa
- Egregia
  - Egregia menziesii - feather boa
- Eisenia
  - Eisenia arborea - southern sea palm, sea oak
  - Eisenia bicyclis - arame
- Lessonia
  - Lessonia adamsiae
  - Lessonia brevifolia
  - Lessonia corrugata
  - Lessonia flavicans
  - Lessonia nigrescens
  - Lessonia spicata
  - Lessonia tholiformis
  - Lessonia trabeculata
  - Lessonia vadosa
  - Lessonia variegata
