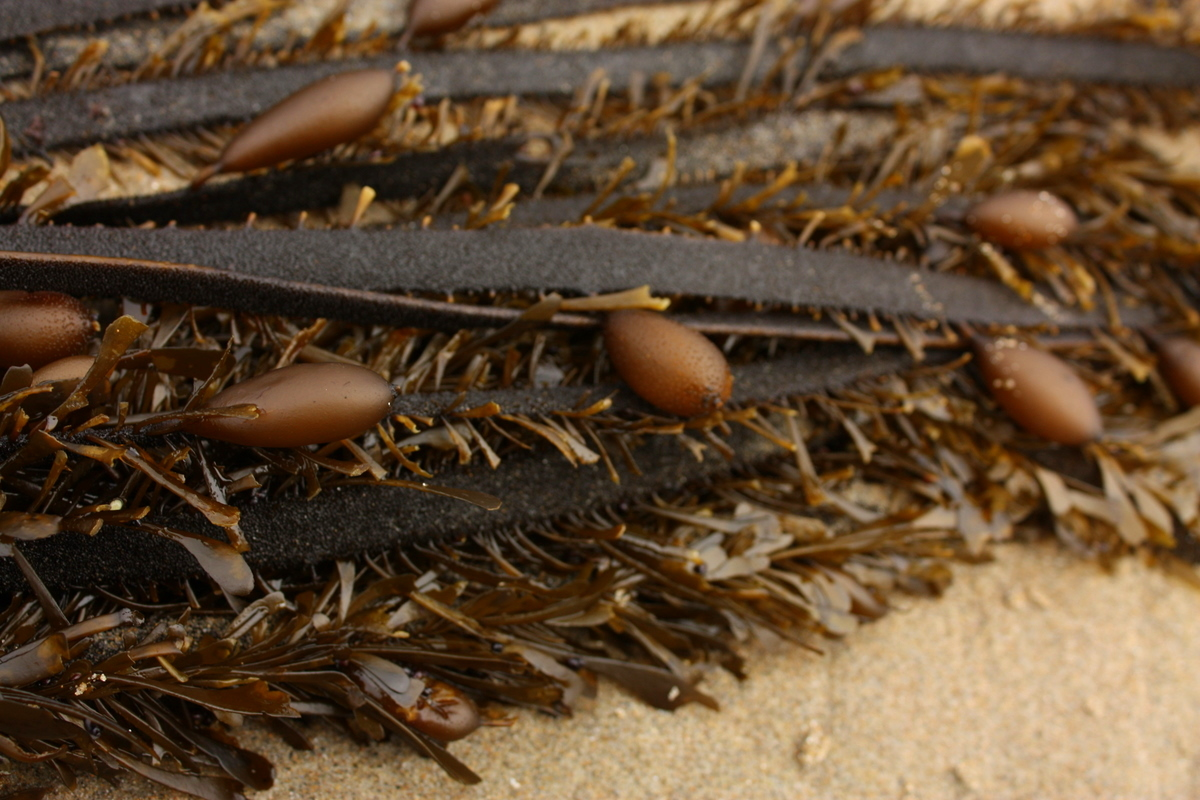

Scientific classification
- Domain: Eukaryota
- Clade: Sar
- Clade: Stramenopiles
- Division: Ochrophyta
- Class: Phaeophyceae
- Order: Laminariales
- Family: Lessoniaceae
- Genus: Egregia; Aresch. 1876
- Species: E. menziesii

Binomial name
- Egregia menziesii (Turner) Aresch., 1876

= Egregia =

Species of alga

Egregia menziesii is a species of kelp known commonly as feather boa kelp. It is the only species in the monotypic genus Egregia. It is native to the coastline of western North America from Alaska to Baja California, where it is a common kelp of the intertidal zone.

== Description ==
It is dark brown in color, shiny and bumpy in texture, and may reach over five meters long. It grows a branching stipe from a thick holdfast. It bears long, flat, straplike fronds lined with small blades each a few centimeters long. There are pneumatocysts at intervals along the fronds which provide buoyancy. The alga varies in morphology; the rachis, or central strip, of the frond may be smooth or corrugated, and the blades along the edge of the rachis may be a variety of shapes.

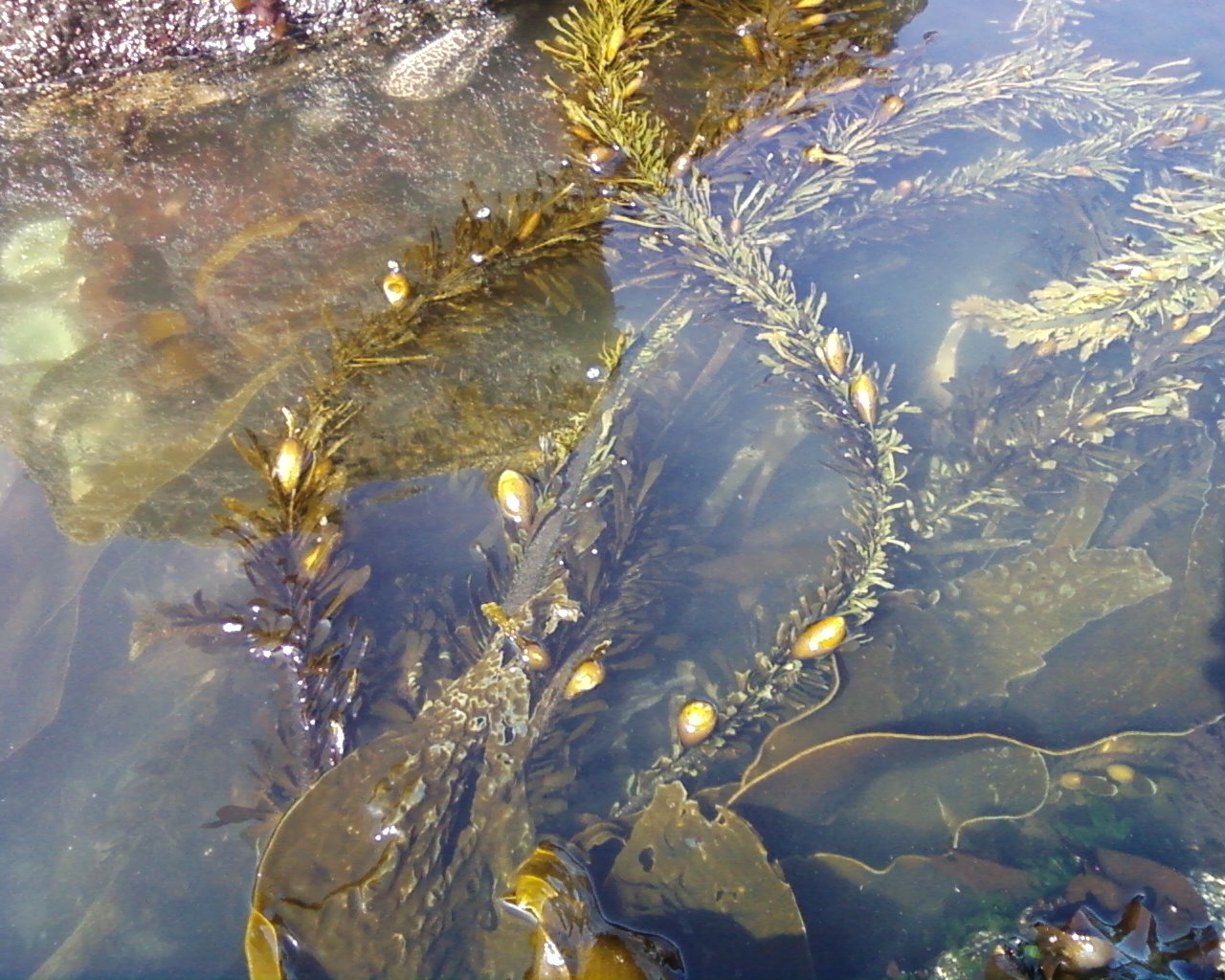
Feather Boa

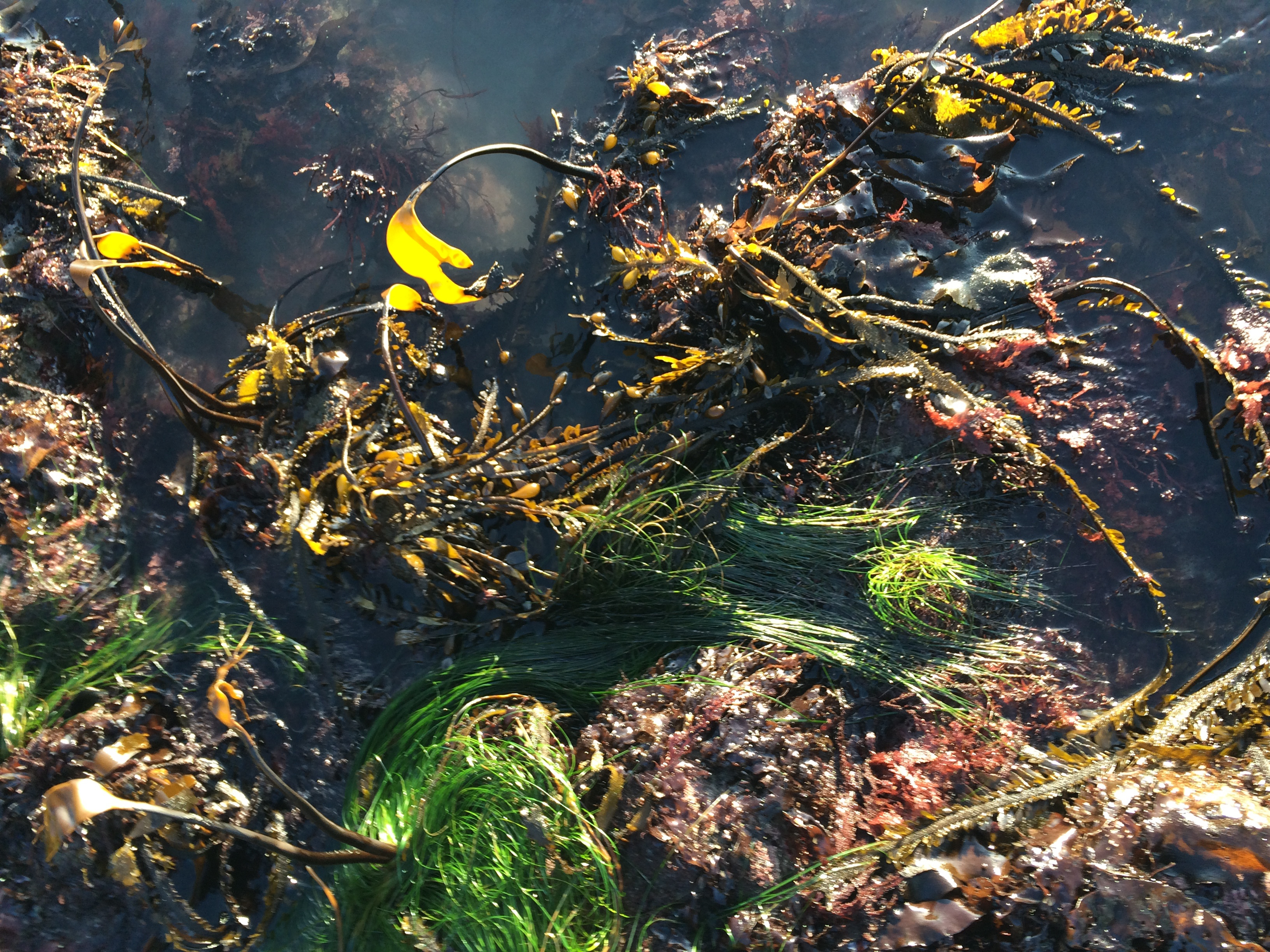
Feather Boa growing in tidepool

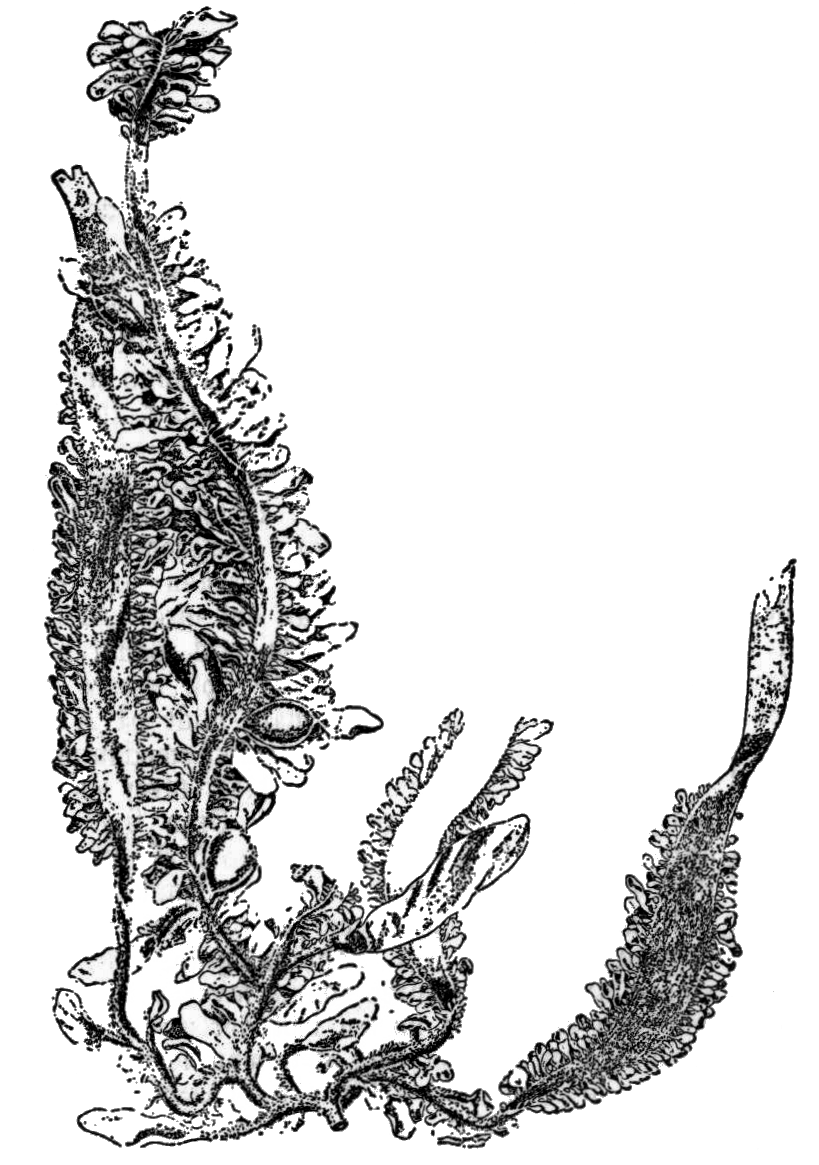
illustration of Egregia menziesii

== Usage ==
E. menziesii is used in baths or for thalassotherapy, along with species such as Turkish towel (Chondracanthus exasperatus), finger kelp (Laminaria digitata), and Fucus.

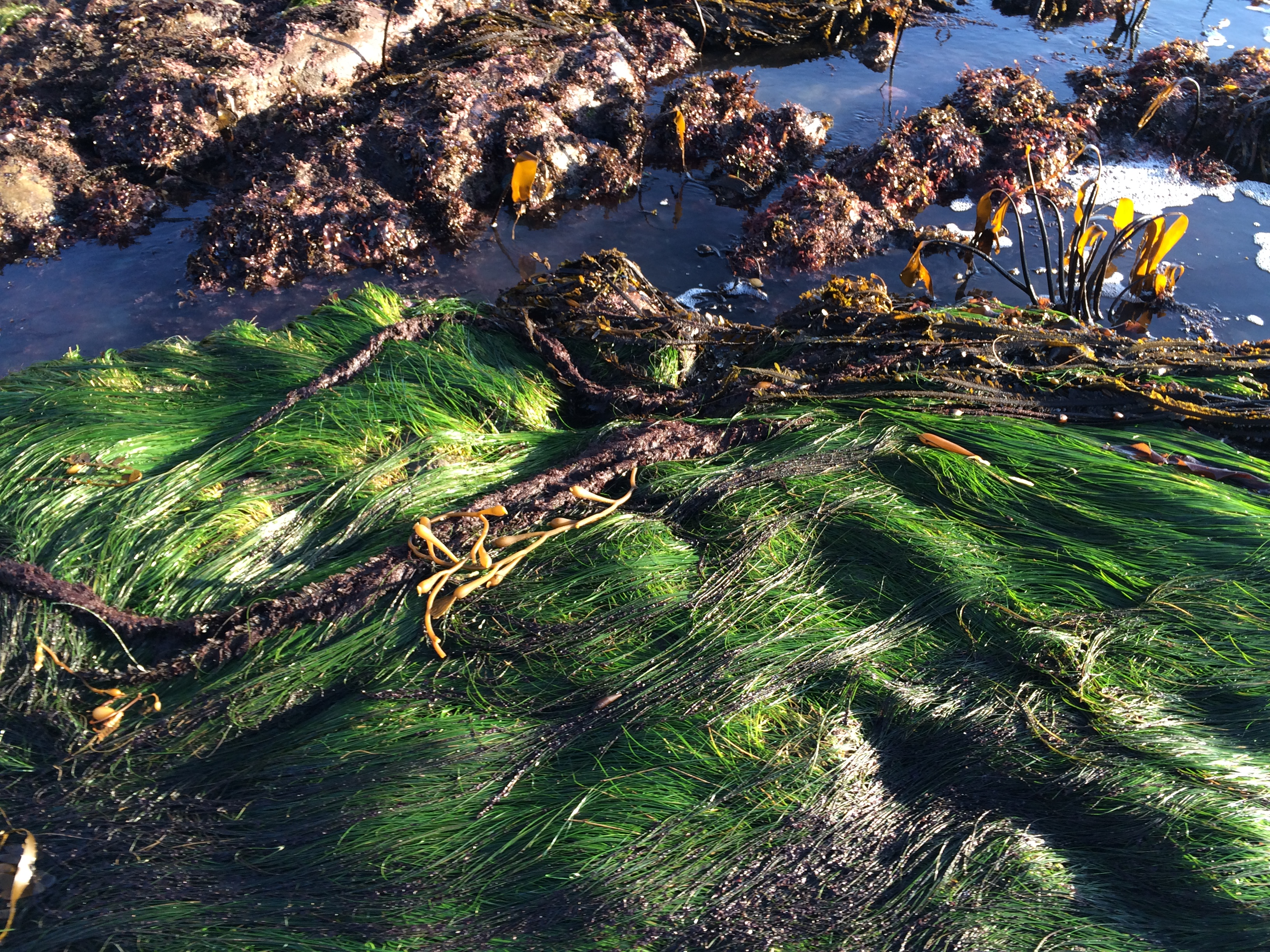
Feather boa kelp on surfgrass Phyllospadix scouleri. Also visible are Laminaria setchellii kelp (upright in the tidepool) and loose floats from Giant kelp. Negative low tide, North Moonstone beach near Cambria, California.

== See also ==
- Discurria insessa, a limpet endemic to Egregia
