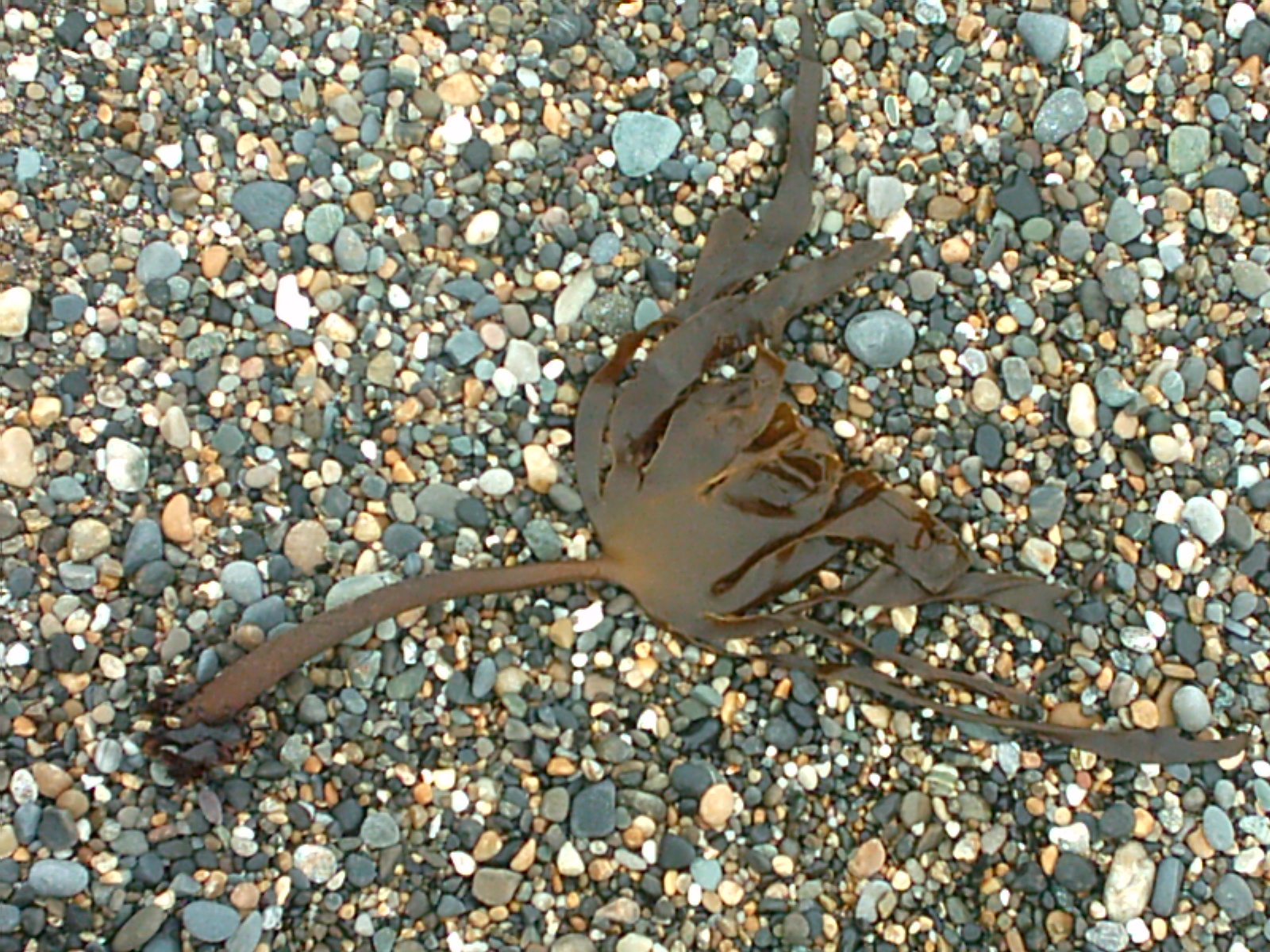
- Ecklonia cava

Scientific classification
- Domain: Eukaryota
- Clade: Sar
- Clade: Stramenopiles
- Division: Ochrophyta
- Class: Phaeophyceae
- Order: Laminariales
- Family: Lessoniaceae
- Genus: Ecklonia; J.W. Hornemann, 1828

Type species
- Ecklonia buccinalis (Linnaeus) Hornemann

Species
- see text

= Ecklonia =

Genus of seaweeds

Ecklonia is a genus of kelp (brown algae) belonging to the family Lessoniaceae.

The genus name of Ecklonia is in honour of Christian Friedrich Ecklon (1795–1868), who was a Danish botanical collector and apothecary.

The genus was circumscribed by Jens Wilken Hornemann in Kongl. Danske Vidensk. Selk. Naturvidenskab. Math. Afh. Vol.3 on pages 385–388 in 1828.

== Known species ==
- Ecklonia biruncinata
- Ecklonia brevipes
- Ecklonia cava
- Ecklonia fastigiata
- Ecklonia kurome
- Ecklonia maxima
- Ecklonia muratii
- Ecklonia radiata
- Ecklonia stolonifera
- Ecklonia radicosa

Ecklonia species produce eckol-type phlorotannins. The name of this genus honours Christian Friedrich Ecklon (1795-1868) the Danish pharmacist, botanist and plant collector.

synonyms

- Ecklonia bicyclis, a synonym of Eisenia bicyclis (Kjellman) Setchell 1905, the arame
