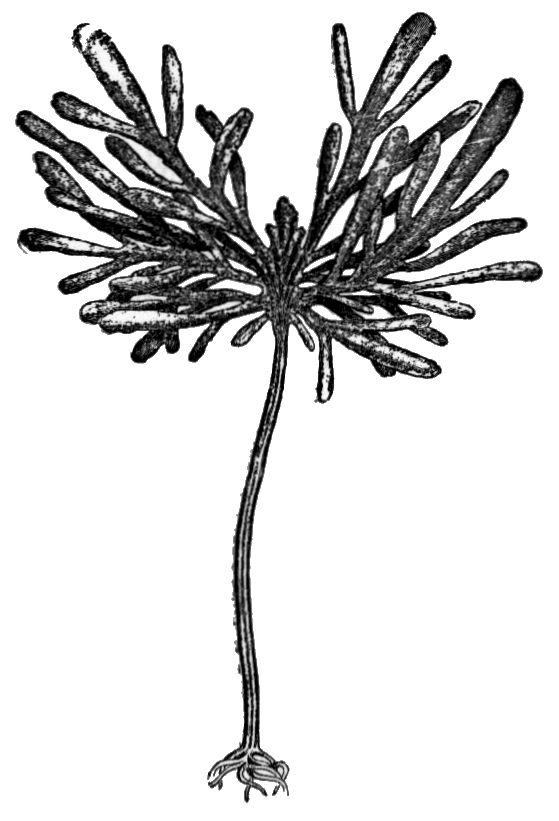

Scientific classification
- Domain: Eukaryota
- Clade: Sar
- Clade: Stramenopiles
- Division: Ochrophyta
- Class: Phaeophyceae
- Order: Laminariales
- Family: Lessoniaceae
- Genus: Eisenia
- Species: E. bicyclis

Binomial name
- Eisenia bicyclis (Kjellman) Setchell 1905

Synonyms
- Ecklonia bicyclis

= Arame =

Eisenia bicyclis

Species of edible kelp

Arame (荒布; Eisenia bicyclis, syn. Ecklonia bicyclis), sea oak is a species of kelp, of the brown algae, best known for its use in Japanese cuisine.

== Description ==
Eisenia bicyclis is indigenous to temperate Pacific Ocean waters centered near Japan, although it is deliberately cultured elsewhere, including South Korea. It grows and reproduces seasonally. Two flattened oval fronds rise from a stiff woody stipe which can be up to about 1 metre (3.3 ft) tall. The fronds are shed and new ones formed annually. The plant appears both branched and feathered. It may be harvested by divers manually or mechanically, and the dried form is available year-round.

== Cuisine ==
It is one of many species of seaweed used in Asian cuisine.

Usually purchased in a dried state, it is reconstituted quickly, taking about five minutes. Arame comes in dark brown strands, has a mild, semi-sweet flavor, and a firm texture. It is added to appetizers, casseroles, muffins, pilafs, soups, toasted dishes, and many other types of food. Its mild flavor makes it adaptable to many uses.

== Chemistry ==
Arame is high in calcium, iodine, iron, magnesium, and vitamin A as well as being a dietary source of many other minerals. It also is harvested for alginate, fertilizer and iodide. It contains the storage polysaccharide laminarin and the tripeptide eisenin, a peptide with immunological activity.

Lignan content in arame is noted by several sources. It also contains the phlorotannins phlorofucofuroeckol A, dioxinodehydroeckol, fucofuroeckol A, eckol, dieckol, triphloroethol A and 7-phloroethol. Extracts of this algae have been tested to combat MRSA staph infections.

== See also ==
- Edible seaweed
- Seafood allergy
