= Phlorotannin =

Class of chemical compounds

Chemical structure of tetrafucol A, a fucol-type phlorotannin found in the brown alga Ascophyllum nodosum

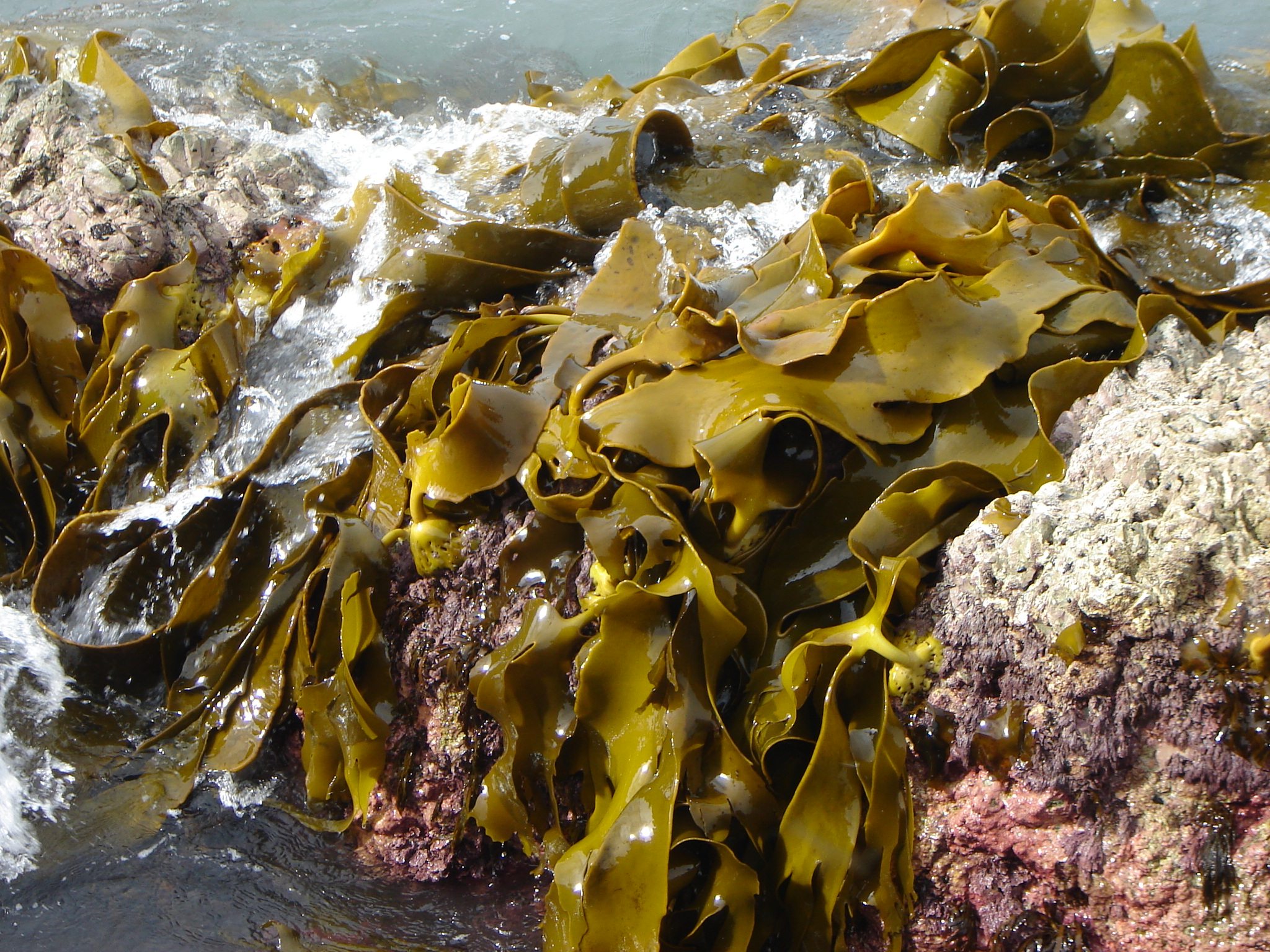
Durvillaea antarctica, a brown algae containing phlorotannins.

Phlorotannins are a type of tannins found in brown algae such as kelps and rockweeds or sargassacean species, and in a lower amount also in some red algae. Contrary to hydrolysable or condensed tannins, these compounds are oligomers of phloroglucinol (polyphloroglucinols). As they are called tannins, they have the ability to precipitate proteins. It has been noticed that some phlorotannins have the ability to oxidize and form covalent bonds with some proteins. In contrast, under similar experimental conditions three types of terrestrial tannins (procyanidins, profisetinidins, and gallotannins) apparently did not form covalent complexes with proteins.

These phenolic compounds are integral structural components of cell walls in brown algae, but they also seem to play many other secondary ecological roles such as protection from UV radiation and defense against grazing.

== Biosynthesis and localization ==
Most of the phlorotannins' biosynthesis is still unknown, but it appears they are formed from phloroglucinols via the acetate-malonate pathway.

They are found within the cell in small vesicles called physodes, where the soluble, polar fraction is sequestrated, and as part of the cell wall, where they are insoluble and act as a structural component. Their concentration is known to be highly variable among different taxa as well as among geographical area, since they respond plastically to a variety of environmental factors. Brown algaes also exude phlorotannins in surrounding seawater.

It has been proposed that phlorotannins are first sequestered in physodes under their polar, reactive form before being oxidized and complexed to the alginic acid of brown algal cell wall by a peroxidase. To this date (2012), not much is known about phlorotannins synthesis. The formation of physodes, vesicles containing phenolic compounds, have been investigated for many years. These cytoplasmic constituents were thought to be synthesized in the chloroplast or its membrane, but more recent studies suggest that the formation may be related to the endoplasmic reticulum and Golgi bodies.

The allocation of phlorotannins among tissues varies along with the species.

The localization of phlorotannins can be investigated by light microscopy after vanillin–HCl staining giving an orange color. The ultrastructural localization of physodes can be examined through transmission electron microscopy in samples primarily fixed in 2.5% glutaraldehyde and with postfixation with 1% osmium tetroxide. For staining, uranyl acetate and lead citrate can be used.

== Extraction and assays ==
In many studies where individual phlorotannins are isolated, extracted phlorotannins are acetylated with acetic anhydride-pyridine to protect them from oxidation. Both lowering the temperature and the addition of ascorbic acid seem to prevent oxidation.

Usual assays to quantify phlorotannins in samples are the Folin-Denis and Prussian blue assays. A more specific assay makes use of 2,4-dimethoxybenzaldehyde (DMBA), a product that reacts specifically with 1,3-and 1,3,5-substituted phenols (e.g., phlorotannins) to form a colored product.

== Structural diversity ==
Eckol, a phlorotannin found in species of the genus Ecklonia.

The nomenclature system for the marine phlorotannins was originally introduced by Glombitza.

Phlorotannins are classified following the arrangement of the phloroglucinol monomeres. More than 150 compounds are known, ranging from 126 Da to 650 kDa in molecular weight. Most of them are found between 10 and 100kDa.

They are distributed in six main subgroups: fucols, phlorethols, fucophloretols, fuhalols and eckols, which are only found in the Alariaceae.

According to linkage type, phlorotannins can be classified into four subclasses, i.e., phlorotannins with an ether linkage (fuhalols and phlorethols, fuhalols are constructed of phloroglucinol units that are connected with para- and ortho-arranged ether bridges containing one additional OH-group in every third ring), with a phenyl linkage (fucols), with an ether and a phenyl linkage (fucophlorethols) and with a dibenzodioxin linkage in eckols and carmalols (derivatives of phlorethols containing a dibenzodioxin moiety), most of which have halogenated representatives in brown algae.

Examples of phlorotannins are fucodiphlorethol G from the seaweed Ecklonia cava, eckol from Ecklonia species or phlorofucofuroeckol-B from Eisenia arborea.

The structural diversity of higher molecular weight molecules can be screened through the use of the 'EDIT' Carbon-13 NMR technique.

== Roles ==
The functions of phlorotannins are still an actual research subject (2012). They show primary and secondary roles, at both cellular and organismic scale.

=== Primary roles ===
==== Structural ====
The structural role of phlorotannins in brown algal cell wall is a primary role of these polyphenolic compounds. This primary role may however not be the main role of the phlorotannins, since studies show they are more abundant in cytoplasm or in the exuded form than in cell wall.

==== Reproductive ====
Cytoplasmic as well as exuded phlorotannins seem to play a role in algal reproduction, by contributing to the formation of the zygote's cell wall and perhaps avoiding multiple fertilization by inhibiting spermatozoid movement.

=== Secondary roles ===
According to the Carbon Nutrient Balance Model, phlorotannins, which are predominantly carbon molecules free of nitrogen, are produced in higher yields in light environment. Light has greater importance than nitrogen availability.

Studies shown that phlorotannins seem to act as a protection for brown algaes in a number of ways. Here are some examples.

==== Antiherbivory defense ====
Phlorotannin production strategy may be constitutive or inducible. As studies demonstrated that herbivory can induce phlorotannin production, it has been suggested that they may have a role in algae defense. However, results form other studies suggest that the deterrent role of phlorotannins on herbivory is highly dependent on both algae and herbivore species. In Fucus vesiculosus, it is galactolipids, rather than phlorotannins, that act as herbivore deterrents against the sea urchin Arbacia punctulata.

==== UV and heavy metals screening ====
Phlorotannins are mostly located at the periphery of the cells, as components of the cell wall. They also contribute to absorption of UV-B light (between 280 and 320 nm) and show absorbance maxima at 200 and 265 nm, corresponding to UV-C wavelengths. Studies also demonstrated that sunlight intensity is related to phlorotannins production in Ascophyllum nodosum and Fucus vesiculosus natural populations. For these reasons, it has been suggested that phlorotannins act as photoprotective substances. Further studies with Lessonia nigrescens and Macrocystis integrifolia demonstrated that both UV-A and UV-B radiation can induce soluble phlorotannins and that there is a correlation between induction of phlorotannins and reduction in the inhibition of photosynthesis and DNA damage, two major effects of UV radiation on vegetal tissues. The fact that phlorotannins are exudated in surrounding water enables them to reduce incident UV exposure on kelp meiospores, phytoplankton and other kelp forests inhabitants, where brown algal biomass is high and water motion is low.

They may also be involved in metal sequestration such as divalent metal ions Sr^{2+}, Mg^{2+}, Ca^{2+}, Be^{2+}, Mn^{2+}, Cd^{2+}, Co^{2+}, Zn^{2+}, Ni^{2+}, Pb^{2+} and Cu^{2+}. If the chelating properties of phlorotannins have been demonstrated in vitro, in situ studies suggest that this characteristic may be species-specific.

==== Algicidal effect ====
Studies demonstrated that phlorotannins can act as an algicide against some dinoflagellates species.

== Therapeutic properties ==
It has been demonstrated that phlorotannins can have anti-diabetic, anti-cancer, anti-oxidation, antibacterial, radioprotective and anti-HIV properties. However, in vivo studies on the effects of these compounds are lacking, most of the research having so far been done in vitro. Regarding anti-allergic property, there is in vivo study on the effect of these compounds.
