= List of seaweeds and marine flowering plants of Australia (temperate waters) =

The list of seaweeds and marine flowering plants of Australia (temperate waters) is a list of marine species that form a part of the flora of Australia.

The geographical range is from Perth, Western Australia to New South Wales, and those tropical species which are also found in this range may also be listed here.. Also widely distributed overseas.)

Family Chordariaceae

- Brown spaghetti weed Cladosiphon filum (Harvey) Kylin (Safety Bay, Western Australia, to Nowra, New South Wales, and around Tasmania. Also widely distributed overseas.)

Family Splachnidiaceae

- Neptune's fingers Splachnidium rugosum (Linnaeus) Greville (Point Sinclair, South Australia, to Sydney, New South Wales, and around Tasmania. Also South Africa, New Zealand and several subantarctic islands.)

Family Stypocaulaceae

- Twisted filament weed Halopteris paniculata (Suhr) Prud’homme van Reine (Port Willunga, South Australia, to Newcastle, New South Wales, and around Tasmania. Also New Zealand, Chile and several subantarctic Islands.)

Family Cladostephaceae

- Bushy brown alga Cladostephus spongiosus (Hudson) C. Agardh (Yanchep, Western Australia, to Keppel Bay, Queensland, and around Tasmania. Also widespread overseas.)

Family Dictyotaceae

- Brown forkweed Dictyota dichotoma (Hudson) Lamouroux (Around Australia including Tasmania. Also widespread overseas.)
- Hairy forkweed Glossophora nigricans (J. Agardh) Womersley (Dongara, Western Australia, to Walkerville, Victoria, and around Tasmania.)
- Crinkleweed Dilophus marginatus J. Agardh (Port Stanvac, South Australia, to Noosa, Queensland, and northern Tasmania.)
- Eastern forkweed Dilophus intermedius (Zanardini) Allender & Kraft (Jervis Bay, New South Wales, to Caloundra, Queensland. Also Lord Howe Island.)
- Mueller's forkweed Dictyopteris muelleri (Sonder) Reinbold (Port Gregory, Western Australia, to Walkerville, Victoria, and around Tasmania.)
- Agardh's forkweed Dictyopteris acrostichoides (J. Agardh) Boergesen (Warrnambool, Victoria, to Rockingham, Queensland, and northern Tasmania.)
- Southern forkweed Dictyopteris australis (Sonder) Askenasy (Dampier, Western Australia, to Port Noarlunga, South Australia. Also Queensland, Lord Howe Island, and widespread overseas.)
- Stringy forkweed Pachydictyon paniculatum (J. Agardh) J. Agardh (Geraldton, Western Australia, to Sydney, New South Wales, and around Tasmania.)
- Spiralled forkweed Lobospira bicuspidata Areschoug (Nickol Bay, Western Australia, to Eden, New South Wales, and northern Tasmania.)
- Elegant padina Padina elegans Koh ex Womersley (Dongara, Western Australia, to Pearson Island, South Australia.)
- Thickened padina Padina crassa Yamada (Tropical Australia south to Narooma, New South Wales. Also Lord Howe Island and widespread in the Indo-West Pacific region.)
- Thin-leaf fanweed Zonaria angustata (Kützing) Papenfuss (Elliston, South Australia, to Eden, New South Wales, and around Tasmania.)
- Fanweed Zonaria turneriana J. Agardh (Geraldton, Western Australia, to Port Phillip Heads, Victoria, and around Tasmania. Also New Zealand.)
- Spiral fanweed Zonaria spiralis (J. Agardh) Papenfuss (Rottnest Island, Western Australia, to Flinders, Victoria.)
- Sydney fanweed Zonaria diesingiana J. Agardh (Green Cape to Coffs Harbour, New South Wales.)
- Peacockweed Lobophora variegata (Lamouroux) Womersley (Around Australia. Also widespread overseas.)
- Southern peacockweed Distromium flabellatum Womersley (Houtman Abrolhos, Western Australia, to Sydney, New South Wales, and northern and eastern Tasmania.)
- Banded fanweed Stypopodium flabelliforme Weber-van Bosse (Tropical Australia south to Rottnest Island, Western Australia, and Jervis Bay, New South Wales. Also Lord Howe Island, and widespread in the Indo-West Pacific region.)
- Split fanweed Taonia australasica J. Agardh (Kangaroo Island, South Australia, to Coffs Harbour, New South Wales. Also Lord Howe Island.)

Family Sporochnaceae

- Stackhouse's seaweed Carpomitra costata (Stackhouse) Batters (Kangaroo Island, South Australia, to Port Stephens (New South Wales), and around Tasmania. Also widely distributed overseas.)
- Common tuftweed Sporochnus comosus C. Agardh (Dongara, Western Australia, to Calliope River, Queensland, and around Tasmania.)
- Open tuftweed Sporochnus radiciformis Turner (C. Agardh) (Rottnest Island, Western Australia, to Botany Bay, New South Wales, and around Tasmania.)
- Spiky tuftweed Perithalia caudata (Labillardière) Womersley (West Bay, Kangaroo Island, South Australia, to Wilsons Promontory, Victoria, and around Tasmania.)
- Clifton's tuftweed Encyothalia cliftonii Harvey (Kalbarri, Western Australia, to Walkerville, Victoria.)
- Chimney-brush seaweed Bellotia eriophorum Harvey (Ceduna, South Australia, to Walkerville, Victoria, and around Tasmania. Also Noosa, Queensland.)

Family Scytosiphonaceae

- Tubular stringweed Scytosiphon lomentaria (Lyngbye) Link (Cottesloe, Western Australia, to Sydney, New South Wales, and around Tasmania. Also widely distributed overseas.)
- Lace ballweed Hydroclathrus clathratus (C. Agardh) Howe (Around Australian mainland. Also widely distributed overseas.)
- Sinuous ballweed Colpomenia sinuosa (Mertens ex Roth) Derbes & Solier (Widespread around Australia and overseas.)
- Smooth ballweed Colpomenia peregrina (Sauvageau) Hamel (Albany, Western Australia, to Heron Island, Queensland, and around Tasmania. Also widely distributed overseas.)

Family Punctariaceae

- Bulbous ballweed Asperococcus bullosus Lamouroux (Rottnest Island, Western Australia, to Port Stephens (New South Wales), and around Tasmania. Also widely distributed overseas.)

Family Lessoniaceae

- Strapweed Lessonia corrugata Lucas (Phillip Island, Victoria, and around Tasmania.)
- Giant kelp Macrocystis pyrifera (Linnaeus) C. Agardh (Eastern, southern and western Tasmania. Also New Zealand, subantarctic islands, South America and the Pacific coast of North America.)
- Northern giant kelp, string kelp Macrocystis angustifolia Bory (Cape Jaffa, South Australia, to Walkerville, Victoria, and northern Tasmania. Also South Africa.)

Family Alariaceae

- Common kelp Ecklonia radiata (C. Agardh) J. Agardh (Kalbarri, Western Australia, to Caloundra, Queensland, and around Tasmania.)
- Japanese kelp Undaria pinnatifida (Harvey) Suringar (Port Phillip Bay, Victoria, and D’Entrecasteaux Channel to Coles Bay, Tasmania. Also Japan, China, New Zealand and France.)

Family Notheiaceae

- Neptune's string Notheia anomala Harvey & Bailey (Albany, Western Australia, to Port Stephens (New South Wales), and around Tasmania. Also New Zealand.)

Family Durvillaeaceae

- Bull kelp Durvillaea potatorum (Labillardière) Areschoug (Cape Jaffa, South Australia, to Bermagui, New South Wales, and western, southern and eastern Tasmania.)

Family Hormosiraceae

- Neptune's necklace Hormosira banksii (Turner) Decaisne (Albany, Western Australia, to Arrawarra, New South Wales, and around Tasmania. Also New Zealand.)
- Branched daggerweed Xiphophora chondrophylla (R. Brown ex Turner) Montagne ex Harvey (Kangaroo Island, South Australia, to Walkerville, Victoria, and northern Tasmania. Also New Zealand.)
- Daggerweed Xiphophora gladiata (Labillardière) Montagne ex Kjellman (Western Port, Victoria, and eastern, western and southern Tasmania.)

Family Seirococcaceae

- Crayweed Phyllospora comosa (Labillardière) C. Agardh (Robe, South Australia, to Port Macquarie, New South Wales, and around Tasmania.)
- Bristled crayweed Seirococcus axillaris (R. Brown ex Turner) Greville (Fishery Bay, South Australia, to Walkerville, Victoria, and around Tasmania.)
- Western crayweed Scytothalia dorycarpa (Turner) Greville (Geraldton, Western Australia, to Point Lonsdale, Victoria, and Georgetown, Tasmania.)

Family Cystoseiraceae

- Flat-leafed seaweed Platythalia angustifolia Sonder (Geraldton to Cape Riche, Western Australia.)
- Sawtooth seaweed Platythalia quercifolia (R. Brown ex Turner) Sonder (Geraldton to Recherche Archipelago, Western Australia.)
- Three-node seaweed Cystoseira trinodis (Forsskål) C. Agardh (Tropical Australia south to Victor Harbor, South Australia, and to Lake Conjola, New South Wales. Also Dunalley, Tasmania, and widespread overseas.)
- Three corners Hormophysa cuneiformis (Gmelin) Silva (Tropical Australia south to Mandurah, Western Australia, and Port Stephens (New South Wales), and northern Spencer Gulf, South Australia. Also widespread in the Indo-West Pacific region.)
- Serrated myriodesma Myriodesma serrulatum (Lamouroux) Decaisne (Dongara to Cape Riche, Western Australia.)
- Oak-leaf myriodesma Myriodesma quercifolium (Bory) J. Agardh (Geraldton, Western Australia, to Port Elliott, South Australia.)
- Brown fingerweed Scaberia agardhii Greville (Houtman Abrolhos, Western Australia, to Sydney, New South Wales, and northern Tasmania. Also Lord Howe Island.)
- Succulent seaweed Carpoglossum confluens (R. Brown ex Turner) Kützing (Elliston, South Australia, to Walkerville, Victoria, and around Tasmania.)
- Flat-lobed cystophora Cystophora platylobium (Mertens) J. Agardh (Eucla, South Australia, to Sydney, New South Wales, and around Tasmania.)
- Zigzag cystophora Cystophora moniliformis (Esper) Womersley & Nizamuddin ex Womersley (Cape Naturaliste, Western Australia, to Port Stephens (New South Wales), and around Tasmania. Also Lord Howe Island.)
- Shore cystophora Cystophora intermedia J. Agardh (Point Sinclair, South Australia, to Portland, Victoria, and Hogan Island, Tasmania.)
- Greville's cystophora Cystophora grevillei (C. Agardh ex Sonder) J. Agardh (Dongara, Western Australia, to Wilsons Promontory, Victoria, and around Tasmania.)
- Tasmanian cystophora Cystophora xiphocarpa Harvey (Cape Otway, Victoria, and around Tasmania.)
- Leafy cystophora Cystophora racemosa (Harvey ex Kützing) J. Agardh (Geographe Bay, Western Australia, to Queenscliff, Victoria.)
- Fishbone cystophora Cystophora pectinata (Greville & C. Agardh ex Sonder) J. Agardh (Perth, Western Australia, to Walkerville, Victoria.)
- Three-branched cystophora Cystophora monilifera J. Agardh (Nickol Bay, Western Australia, to Sydney, New South Wales, and south to Freycinet Peninsula Tasmania.)
- Expansive cystophora Cystophora expansa J. Agardh (Yallingup, Western Australia, to Sydney, New South Wales, and northern Tasmania.)
- Grape cystophora Cystophora botryocystis Sonder (Perth, Western Australia, to Port Phillip Bay, Victoria, and northern Tasmania.)
- Brown's cystophora Cystophora brownii (Turner) J. Agardh (Dongara, Western Australia, to Victor Harbor, South Australia, and Waterhouse Point, Tasmania.)
- Womersley's cystophora Cystophora gracilis Womersley (Cowaramup Bay, Western Australia, to Kangaroo Island, South Australia.)
- Western cystophora Cystophora harveyi Womersley (Geographe Bay to Walpole, Western Australia.)
- Club-leafed cystophora Cystophora torulosa (R. Brown ex Turner) J. Agardh (Apollo Bay to Wilsons Promontory, Victoria, and around Tasmania. Also New Zealand.)
- Open-branched cystophora Cystophora retorta (Mertens) J. Agardh (Nickol Bay, Western Australia, to Crookhaven Heads, New South Wales, and south to Spring Bay, Tasmania.)
- Slender cystophora Cystophora siliquosa J. Agardh (Geographe Bay, Western Australia, to Wilsons Promontory, Victoria, and northern Tasmania.)
- Congested cystophora Cystophora congesta Womersley & Nizamuddin (Elliston, South Australia, to Wilsons Promontory, Victoria, and around Tasmania.)
- Labillardière's cystophora Cystophora retroflexa (Labillardière) J. Agardh (Kangaroo Island, South Australia, to Sydney, New South Wales, and around Tasmania. Also New Zealand.)
- Bushy cystophora Cystophora subfarcinata (Mertens) J. Agardh (Nickol Bay, Western Australia, to Wilsons Promontory, Victoria, and around Tasmania.)
- Awled cystophora Cystophora cuspidata J. Agardh (Point Sinclair, South Australia, to Port Phillip, Victoria, and northern Tasmania.)
- Narrow grapeweed Caulocystis cephalornithos (Labillardière) Areschoug (Cape Naturaliste, Western Australia, to Sydney, New South Wales, and around Tasmania.)
- Grapeweed Caulocystis uvifera (C. Agardh) Areschoug (Shark Bay, Western Australia, to Sydney, New South Wales, and northern and eastern Tasmania. Also Norfolk Island.)
- Bushy tangleweed Acrocarpia paniculata (Turner) Areschoug (Ceduna, South Australia, to Port Stephens (New South Wales), and around Tasmania. Also Lord Howe Island.)
- Spiky tangleweed Acrocarpia robusta (J. Agardh) Womersley (Cape Naturaliste to Israelite Bay, Western Australia.)

Family Sargassaceae

- Multi-shaped sargassum Sargassum heteromorphum J. Agardh (Rottnest Island, Western Australia, to San Remo, Victoria, and northern Tasmania.)
- Deciduous sargassum Sargassum decipiens (R. Brown ex Turner) J. Agardh (Cape Naturaliste, Western Australia, to Western Port, Victoria, and around Tasmania.)
- Variable sargassum Sargassum varians Sonder (Perth, Western Australia, to Wilsons Promontory, Victoria, and northern Tasmania.)
- Common sargassum Sargassum verruculosum (Mertens) C. Agardh (Cape Leeuwin, Western Australia, to Sydney, New South Wales, and around Tasmania. Also New Zealand.)
- Broad-leafed sargassum Sargassum fallax Sonder (Houtman Abrolhos, Western Australia, to Ballina, New South Wales, and around Tasmania.)
- Surf sargassum Sargassum vestitum (R. Brown ex Turner) C. Agardh (Robe, South Australia, to Mallacoota Point, Victoria, and around Tasmania.)
- Lacerated sargassum Sargassum lacerifolium (Turner) C. Agardh (Pearson Island, South Australia, to Jervis Bay, New South Wales, and around Tasmania.)

== Phylum (Division) Rhodophyta ==
(Red algae, red seaweeds)

Family Bangiaceae

- Lucas' laver Porphyra lucasii (R. Brown ex Turner) C. Agardh (Cottesloe, Western Australia, to Sydney, New South Wales, and around Tasmania.)
- Southern laver Porphyra columbina Montagne (Elliston, South Australia, to Sydney, New South Wales, and around Tasmania. Also New Zealand, South America and subantarctic islands.)

Family Liagoraceae

- Southern liagora Liagora wilsoniana Zeh (Rottnest Island, Western Australia, to Walkerville, Victoria, and around Tasmania.)

Family Galaxauraceae

- Cylindrical galaxaura Galaxaura obtusata (Ellis & Solander) Lamouroux (Tropical Australia south to Augusta, Western Australia, and to Lake Macquarie, New South Wales. Also widespread overseas in tropical and subtropical regions.)
- Leafy galaxaura Galaxaura marginata (Ellis & Solander) Lamouroux (Around the Australian mainland and south to Freycinet Peninsula, Tasmania. Also widespread overseas.)
- Tsinglan alga Scinaia tsinglanensis Tseng (Around the Australian mainland and Tasmania. Also widespread overseas.)

Family Gelidiaceae

- Agarweed Pterocladia lucida (Turner) J. Agardh (Kalbarri, Western Australia, to Coffs Harbour, New South Wales, and around Tasmania. Also Lord Howe Island and New Zealand.)
- Pinnate agarweed Pterocladia capillacea (Gmelin) Bornet (Perth, Western Australia, to Stradbroke Island, Queensland, and around Tasmania. Also widespread overseas.)
- Southern agarweed Gelidium australe J. Agardh (Perth, Western Australia, to Walkerville, Victoria, and around Tasmania.)

Family Peyssonneliaceae

- Red seafan Sonderopelta coriacea Womersley & Sinkora (Ceduna, South Australia, to Walkerville, Victoria, and around Tasmania. Also New Zealand.)
- New Holland seafan Peyssonnelia novaehollandiae Kützing (Geraldton, Western Australia, to Coffs Harbour, New South Wales, and around Tasmania.)

Family Polyidaceae

- False coralline Rhodopeltis australis Harvey (Rottnest Island, Western Australia, to Point Roadnight, Victoria.)

Family Halymeniaceae

- Southwestern forkweed Carpopeltis elata (Harvey) de Toni (Geraldton to Recherche Archipelago, Western Australia.)
- Southern forkweed Carpopeltis phyllophora (Hooker & Harvey) Schmitz (Geraldton, Western Australia, to Phillip Island, Victoria, and around Tasmania.)
- Zanardini's red alga Halymenia plana Zanardini (Eucla, South Australia, to Walkerville, Victoria, and around Tasmania.)
- Kraft's red alga Halymenia kraftii Womersley & Lewis (Jervis Bay, New South Wales, and southern Tasmania.)
- Floral red alga Halymenia floresia (Clemente) C. Agardh (Around Australian mainland. Also widespread overseas.)
- Western spongeweed Codiophyllum flabelliforme (Sonder) Schmitz (Houtman Abrolhos to Albany, Western Australia.)
- Japanese slipperyweed Grateloupia turuturu Yamada, 1941 (D’Entrecasteaux Channel to Bicheno, Tasmania. Also Japan, Russia, USA, New Zealand, western Africa and Europe.)
- Red leatherstraps Gelinaria ulvoidea Sonder (Houtman Abrolhos, Western Australia, to Walkerville, Victoria, and northern Tasmania.)
- Constricted wireweed Polyopes constrictus (Turner) J. Agardh (Sleaford Bay, South Australia, to Twofold Bay, New South Wales, and around Tasmania.)
- Branched spongeweed Thamnoclonium dichotomum (J. Agardh) J. Agardh (Nickol Bay, Western Australia, to Ballina, New South Wales, and around Tasmania.)

Family Kallymeniaceae

- Pitted red lettuce Kallymenia cribrosa Harvey (Houtman Abrolhos, Western Australia, to Flinders, Victoria, and around Tasmania.)
- Red lettuce Kallymenia tasmanica Harvey (Gulf St Vincent, South Australia, to Western Port, Victoria, and around Tasmania.)
- Bruny red alga Cirrulicarpus polycoelioides (J. Agardh) Womersley (Bruny Island to Maria Island, Tasmania.)
- Gelatinous forkweed Polycoelia laciniata J. Agardh (Southwestern Western Australia to Flinders, Victoria, and around Tasmania.)
- Turner's red alga Callophyllis rangiferina (Turner) Womersley (Champion Bay, Western Australia, to Tathra, New South Wales, and around Tasmania.)
- Lambert's red alga Callophyllis lambertii (Turner) J. Agardh (Ceduna, South Australia, to Walkerville, Victoria, and around Tasmania.)
- Norris' red alga Thamnophyllis lacerata Womersley & Norris (Head of Great Australian Bight to Gulf St Vincent, South Australia, and southeastern Tasmania.)

Family Phyllophoraceae

- Delicate red alga Stenogramme interrupta (C. Agardh) Montagne ex Harvey (Nuyts Reef, South Australia, to Arrawarra, New South Wales, and northern and eastern Tasmania. Also New Zealand and widespread in the northern hemisphere.)

Family Nemastomataceae

- Fereday's red alga Tsengia feredayae (Harvey) Womersley & Kraft (Nuyts Reef, South Australia, to Walkerville, Victoria, and around Tasmania. Also New Zealand.)

Family Gigartinaceae

- Variable red alga Rhodoglossum gigartinoides (Sonder) Edyvane & Womersley (Hamelin Bay, Western Australia, to San Remo, Victoria, and around Tasmania.)
- Recurved gigartina Gigartina recurva Edyvane & Womersley (Musselroe Bay to Recherche Bay, Tasmania.)
- Mueller's gigartina Gigartina muelleriana Setchell & Gardner (Robe, South Australia, to Port Phillip, Victoria, and around, Tasmania.)

Family Dicranemaceae

- Amphibolis wireweed Dicranema revolutum (C. Agardh) J. Agardh (Shark Bay, Western Australia, to Walkerville, Victoria, and Flinders Island, Tasmania.)
- Southern wireweed Peltasta australis J. Agardh (West Island, South Australia, to Cape Woolamai, Victoria, and around Tasmania.)

Family Sarcodiaceae

- Marginate sarcodia Sarcodia marginata J. Agardh (Port Elliott, South Australia, to Port Phillip, Victoria, and southeastern Tasmania.)

Family Acrotylaceae

- Notched red lettuce Hennedya crispa Harvey (Geraldton, Western Australia, to Pearson Island, South Australia.)

Family Areschougiaceae

- Jellyweed Betaphycus speciosum (Sonder) Doty (Dampier to Perth, Western Australia. Also Mauritius and Madagascar.)
- Broad-leafed fishbone Callophycus dorsiferus (C. Agardh) Silva (Dongara to Cape Leeuwin, Western Australia.)
- Narrow-leafed fishbone Callophycus oppositifolius (C. Agardh) Silva (Geraldton, Western Australia, to Yorke Peninsula, South Australia.)
- Leafy fishbone Callophycus harveyanus (J. Agardh) Silva (Dongara, Western Australia, to Eucla, South Australia.)
- Sonder's bubbleweed Erythroclonium sonderi Harvey (Houtman Abrolhos, Western Australia, to Robe, South Australia, and King Island, Tasmania.)
- Congested mopweed Areschougia congesta (Turner) J. Agardh (Hamelin Bay, Western Australia, to Walkerville, Victoria, and around Tasmania.)

Family Plocamiaceae

- Common plocamium Plocamium angustum (J. Agardh) Hooker & Harvey (Ceduna, South Australia, to The Entrance, New South Wales, and around Tasmania. Also Lord Howe Island.)
- Serrated plocamium Plocamium dilatatum J. Agardh (Victor Harbor, South Australia, to Port Phillip Bay, Victoria, and around Tasmania.)
- Stumpy plocamium Plocamium patagiatum J. Agardh (Great Australian Bight, South Australia, to Cape Woolamai, Victoria, and around Tasmania.)
- Merten's plocamium Plocamium mertensii (Greville) Harvey (Nickol Bay, Western Australia, to Gabo Island, Victoria, and northern Tasmania.)
- Preiss' plocamium Plocamium preissianum Sonder (Geraldton, Western Australia, to Wilsons Promontory, Victoria, and northern Tasmania.)
- Cartilaginous plocamium Plocamium cartilagineum (Linnaeus) Dixon (Shark Bay, Western Australia, to Newcastle, New South Wales, and around Tasmania. Also widespread in temperate regions worldwide.)

Family Phacelocarpaceae

- Serrated red seaweed Phacelocarpus peperocarpus (Poiret) Wynne, Ardré & Silva (Esperance, Western Australia, to Sydney, New South Wales, and northern Tasmania.)

Family Cystocloniaceae

- Frilled forkweed Craspedocarpus blepharicarpus (Harvey) Min-Thein & Womersley (Geraldton, Western Australia, to Phillip Island, Victoria, and around Tasmania.)
- Veined forkweed Craspedocarpus venosus (Kützing) Min-Thein & Womersley (Fremantle, Western Australia, to Western Port, Victoria, and around Tasmania.)
- Harvey's forkweed Rhodophyllis multipartita Harvey (Elliston, South Australia, to Gabo Island, Victoria, and around Tasmania.)

Family Mychodeaceae

- Tangled wireweed Mychodea aciculare (J. Agardh) Kraft (Cape Riche, Western Australia, to Walkerville, Victoria, and around Tasmania.)

Family Hypnaeaceae

- Filamentous hookweed Hypnea ramentacea (C. Agardh) J. Agardh (Dongara, Western Australia, to Walkerville, Victoria, and around Tasmania.)

Family Bonnemaisoniaceae

- Armed asparagusweed Asparogopsis armata Harvey (Perth, Western Australia, to Port Stephens (New South Wales), and around Tasmania. Also New Zealand and Europe.)
- Asparagusweed Asparogopsis taxiformis (Delile) Trevisan (Tropical Australia south to Rottnest Island, Western Australia, and to southern Queensland. Also Gulf St Vincent and Spencer Gulf in South Australia, Lord Howe Island, and widespread overseas.)
- Beautiful red forkweed Delisea pulchra (Greville) Montagne (Perth, Western Australia, to Ballina, New South Wales, and around Tasmania. Also New Zealand and subantarctic islands.)
- Plumed forkweed Delisea plumosa Levring (Port Davey to Bicheno, Tasmania. Also New Zealand.)
- Australasian red forkweed Ptilonia australasica Harvey (Robe, South Australia, to Williamstown, Victoria, and around Tasmania.)
- Straggly red forkweed Ptilonia subulifera J. Agardh (Victor Harbor, South Australia, to Walkerville, Victoria, and around Tasmania.)

Family Graciliariaceae

- Clifton's gracilaria Gracilaria cliftonii Withell, Millar & Kraft (Perth, Western Australia, to Walkerville, Victoria, and northern Tasmania.)
- Whip-like gracilaria Gracilaria flagelliformis (Sonder) Womersley (Geraldton, Western Australia, to Geographe Bay, Western Australia.)
- Variable gracilaria Gracilaria secundata Harvey (Kangaroo Island, South Australia, to Newcastle, New South Wales, and around Tasmania.)
- Fleshy red curdiea Curdiea angustata (Sonder) Millar (Encounter Bay, South Australia, to Sydney, New South Wales, and around Tasmania.)
- Irvin's curdiea Curdiea irvineae J. Agardh (Green Head to Cape Leeuwin, Western Australia.)
- Leathery forkweed Melanthalia obtusata J. Agardh (Kangaroo Island, South Australia, to Port Phillip Bay, Victoria, and around Tasmania.)
- Thin leathery forkweed Melanthalia abscissa (Turner) Hooker & Harvey (Wedge Island, South Australia, to Wilsons Promontory, Victoria, and around Tasmania.)

Family Corallinaceae

- Flat-branched coralline Amphiroa anceps (Lamarck) Decaisne (Around the Australian mainland and south to Bicheno, Tasmania.)
- Twiggy coralline Amphiroa gracilis Harvey (Kalbarri, Western Australia, to Yorke Peninsula, South Australia.)
- Tufted coralline Corallina officinalis Linnaeus (Around Australia and Tasmania. Also widespread overseas.)
- Rosy coralline Haliptilon roseum (Lamarck) Garbary & Johansen (Shark Bay, Western Australia, to Bowen, Queensland, and around Tasmania. Also Lord Howe Island and New Zealand.)
- Ward's coralline Arthrocardia wardi (Harvey) Areschoug (Yorke Peninsula, South Australia, to Norah Head, New South Wales, and around Tasmania.)
- Arrow coralline Cheilosporum sagittatum (Lamouroux) Areschoug (Perth, Western Australia, to Coffs Harbour, New South Wales, and around Tasmania.)
- Seagrass coralline Metagoniolithon stelliferum (Lamarck) Weber–van Bosse (Shark Bay, Western Australia, to Wilsons Promontory, Victoria, and northern Tasmania.)
- Radiate coralline Metagoniolithon radiatum (Lamarck) Ducker (Dongara, Western Australia, to Walkerville, Victoria, and around Tasmania.)
- Ball coralline Jania microarthrodia Lamouroux (Geraldton, Western Australia, to southern New South Wales and around Tasmania. Also New Zealand.)
- Shore coralline Spongites hyperellus (Foslie) Penrose (Western Port, Victoria, and around Tasmania.)
- Button coralline Synarthrophyton patena (J.D. Hooker & Harvey) Townsend (Rottnest Island, Western Australia, to Sydney, New South Wales, and around Tasmania. Also New Zealand, South Africa and various subantarctic islands.)
- Rosette coralline Metamastophora flabellata (Sonder) Setchell (Kalbarri, Western Australia, to Wilsons Promontory, Victoria, and around Tasmania.)
- Split coralline Mastophoropsis canaliculata (Harvey) Woelkerling (Encounter Bay, South Australia, to Wilsons Promontory, Victoria, and around Tasmania.)
- Fan coralline Phymatolithon masonianum Wilks & Woelkerling (Cape Buffon, South Australia, and around Tasmania.)
- Large-lobe rhodolith Sporolithon durum (Foslie) Townsend & Woelkerling (Rottnest Island, Western Australia, to Botany Bay, New South Wales.)

Family Rhodymeniaceae

- Red grapeweed Botryocladia sonderi Silva (Dongara, Western Australia, to Waratah Ba, Victoria, and northern Tasmania.)
- Cactus grapeweed Coelarthrum opuntia (Endlicher) Borgesen (Northern, western and southern Australia to Walkerville, Victoria, and northern Tasmania.)
- Poseidon's fingers Gloiosaccion brownii Harvey (Geraldton, Western Australia, to Jervis Bay, New South Wales, and around Tasmania.)
- Iridescent buttonweed Erythrymenia minuta Kylin (Perth, Western Australia, to Portsea, Victoria, and around Tasmania.)
- Frilled red strapweed Hymenocladia usnea (R. Brown ex Turner) J. Agardh (Dongara, Western Australia, to Walkerville, Victoria, and Kent Group, Tasmania.)
- Variable red strapweed Hymenocladia chondricola (Sonder) J. Lewis (Dongara, Western Australia, to Walkerville, Victoria, and around Tasmania.)
- Sonder's red forkweed Rhodymenia sonderi Silva (Geraldton, Western Australia, to Coff Harbour, New South Wales, and around Tasmania. Also New Zealand.)
- Tasmanian red forkweed Rhodymenia cuneata Harvey (Port Davey to Musselroe Bay, Tasmania.)
- Fringed red forkweed Gloiocladia polycarpa (Harvey) Womersley (Kangaroo Island, South Australia, to Western Port, Victoria, and around Tasmania.)

Family Champiaceae

- Agardh's champia Champia viridis C. Agardh (Rottnest Island, Western Australia, to Jervis Bay, New South Wales, and around Tasmania.)
- Iridescent champia Champia stipitata Huisman (Darwin, NT, to Rottnest Island, Western Australia.)

Family Ceramiaceae

- Beautiful ceramium Ceramium excellens J. Agardh (Great Australian Bight, South Australia, to Western Port, Victoria, and around Tasmania.)
- Red seabubbles Griffithsia monilis Harvey (Fremantle, Western Australia, to Redcliff, Queensland, and around Tasmania.)
- Tufted red seaweed Ballia callitricha (C. Agardh) Montagne (Nuyts Reef, South Australia, to Green Cape, New South Wales, and around Tasmania. Also New Zealand, South America and subantarctic islands.)
- Delicate featherweed Euptilota articulata (J. Agardh) Schmitz (Abrolhos Is, Western Australia, to Coffs Harbour, New South Wales, and around Tasmania. Also Lord Howe Island.)
- Red feltweed Haloplegma preissii (Harvey) Montagne (Around Australia and Tasmania. Also widespread overseas.)
- Gunn's stringweed Carpothamnion gunnianum (Harvey) Kützing (Houtman Abrolhos, Western Australia, to Phillip Island, Victoria, and around Tasmania.)

Family Delesseriaceae

- Ruffled red seaweed Hemineura frondosa Harvey (Abrolhos Is, Western Australia, to Gabo Island, Victoria, and around Tasmania.)
- Elegant red sea lace Claudea elegans Lamouroux (Fremantle, Western Australia, to Walkerville, Victoria, and northern Tasmania.)
- Southern red sea lace Martensia australis Harvey (Shark Bay., Western Australia, to Coffs Harbour, New South Wales, and northern Tasmania. Also Lord Howe Island and China.)
- Gunn's sea lettuce Myriogramme gunniana (Hooker & Harvey) Kylin (Port Elliot, South Australia, to Walkerville, Victoria, and around Tasmania)
- Veined sea lettuce Schizoseris hymenema (Zanardini) Womersley (Bruny Island. to Hobart, Tasmania.)
- Bombay sea lettuce Schizoseris bombayensis (Borgesen) Womersley (Port Phillip, Victoria, to the southern Great Barrier Reef, Queensland, and southeastern Tasmania. Also Lord Howe Island and widespread in the Indian and Pacific Oceans.)
- Luminous strapweed Sarcomenia delesserioides Sonder (Abrolhos Is, Western Australia, to Western Port, Victoria.)
- Red sealeaf Halicnide similans (J. Agardh) J. Agardh (Safety Bay, Western Australia, to Point Hicks, Victoria, and around Tasmania.)

Family Dasyaceae

- Pink dasya Dasya extensa Sonder ex Kützing (Dongara, Western Australia, to Walkerville, Victoria, and northern Tasmania.)
- Oak-leaf red alga Thuretia quercifolia Decaisne (Dongara, Western Australia, to Walkerville, Victoria, and northern Tasmania.)

Family Rhodomelaceae

- Feather leafweed Cliftonaea pectinata Harvey (Geraldton, Western Australia to Port Phillip Heads, Victoria.)
- Harvey's leafweed Dictyomenia harveyana Sonder (Dongara, Western Australia, to Green Cape, New South Wales, and around Tasmania.)
- Lobed leafweed Pollexfenia lobata (Hooker & Harvey) Falkenberg (Abrolhos Is, Western Australia, to Walkerville, Victoria, and around Tasmania.)
- Cross-hatched leafweed Lenormandia marginata Hooker & Harvey (Waterloo Bay, South Australia, to Gabo Island, Victoria, and around Tasmania.)
- Spongy leafweed Epiglossum smithiae (Hooker & Harvey) Kützing (Kangaroo Island, South Australia, to Green Cape, New South Wales, and south to Bicheno, Tasmania.)
- Bushy laurencia Laurencia majuscula (Harvey) Lucas (Around Australian mainland and Tasmania. Also widespread in the Indo-West Pacific region.)
- Club-branched laurencia Laurencia clavata Sonder (Dongara, Western Australia, to Walkerville, Victoria, and around Tasmania.)
- Fern laurencia Laurencia brongniartii J. Agardh (Around mainland Australia. Also widespread overseas.)
- Fishbone chondria Chondria incrassata (J. Agardh) Gordon-Mills & Womersley (Elliston, South Australia, to Walkerville, Victoria, and around Tasmania)
- Twisted red strapweed Osmundaria prolifera Lamouroux (Kalbarri, Western Australia, to Victor Harbor, South Australia.)

== Kingdom Plantae ==
=== Phylum (Division) Chlorophyta ===
(Green algae, green seaweeds)

Family Ulvaceae

- Ruffled sea lettuce Ulva taeniata (Setchell) Setchell & Gardner (Elliston, South Australia, to Walkerville, Victoria, and around Tasmania. Also NZand and USA.)
- Southern sea lettuce Ulva australis Areschoug (Whitford Beach, Western Australia, to Terrigal, New South Wales, and around Tasmania.)
- Baitweed Ulva compressa Linnaeus (Around Australia. Also widespread overseas.)

Family Cladophoraceae

- Mermaid's necklace Chaetomorpha coliformis (Montagne) Kützing (Venus Bay, South Australia, to Walkerville, Victoria, and around Tasmania. Also New Zealand and South America.)
- Green tangleweed Chaetomorpha billardierii Kützing (Venus Bay, South Australia, to Walkerville, Victoria, and around Tasmania. Also New Zealand and South America.)
- Green brushweed Apjohnia laetevirens Harvey (Green Head, Western Australia, to Collaroy, New South Wales, and northern Tasmania.)
- Fereday's filamentweed Cladophora feredayi Harvey (Cottesloe, Western Australia, to Port Jackson, New South Wales, and around Tasmania. Also New Zealand and the Mediterranean.)

Family Anadyomenaceae

- Green veinweed Struvea plumosa Sonder (Dongara, Western Australia, to Victor Harbor, South Australia.)

Family Valoniaceae

- Liverwort seaweed Dictyosphaeria sericea Harvey (Rottnest Island, Western Australia, to Walkerville, Victoria, and northern Tasmania.)

Family Codiaceae

- Bubble codium Codium ?megalophysum Silva (Busselton, Western Australia. Also South Africa.)
- Sea apple Codium pomoides J. Agardh (Esperance, Western Australia, to Walkerville, Victoria, and around Tasmania.)
- Encrusting codium Codium dimorphum Svedelius (Eastern Tasmania. Also New Zealand and Chile.)
- Green spongeweed Codium spongiosum Harvey (Albany, Western Australia, to Merimbula, New South Wales. Also Lord Howe Island and widespread overseas.)
- Wide-forked codium Codium cuneatum Setchell & Gardiner (Tropical Australia south to Jervis Bay, New South Wales. Also widespread overseas.)
- Forked codium Codium duthieae Silva (Champion Bay, Western Australia, to Walkerville, Victoria, and northern Tasmania. Also South Africa.)
- Harvey's codium Codium harveyi Silva (Shark Bay, Western Australia, to Lake Macquarie, New South Wales, and around Tasmania. Also New Zealand.)
- Southern codium Codium australicum Silva (Geographe Bay, Western Australia, to Tuggerah Lakes, New South Wales, and around Tasmania. Also New Zealand.)
- Velvet codium Codium fragile (Suringar) Hariot (Port Gawler, South Australia, to Ballina, New South Wales, and around Tasmania. Also widespread overseas.)

Family Udoteaceae

- Green necklaceweed Halimeda cuneata Hering (Tropical Australia to Recherche Archipelago, Western Australia. Also southern Africa.)
- Neptune's shaving brush Penicillus nodulosus Blainville (Tropical Australia south to Rottnest Island, Western Australia. Also widespread in the Indo-West Pacific region.)
- Neptune's mat Rhipiliopsis peltata (J. Agardh) Gepp & Gepp (Canal Rocks, Western Australia, to Inverloch, Victoria.)
- Green seafan Avrainvillea clavatiramea Gepp & Gepp (Rottnest Island, Western Australia, to Port Phillip, Victoria.)
- Bushy seafan Callipsygma wilsonis J. Agardh (Kangaroo Island, South Australia, to Port Phillip, Victoria, and south to Musselroe Bay, Tasmania.)

Family Caulerpaceae

- Serrated caulerpa Caulerpa scalpelliformis (R. Brown ex Turner) C. Agardh (Whitford Beach, Western Australia, to Jervis Bay, New South Wales, and around Tasmania.)
- Sawtooth caulerpa Caulerpa remotifolia Sonder (Gulf St Vincent, South Australia, to Westernport, Victoria, and south to Orford, Tasmania.)
- Invasive caulerpa Caulerpa taxifolia (Vahl) C. Agardh (Tropical Australia south to Montebello Island, Western Australia, and southern Queensland. Also Lord Howe Island, and widespread overseas. Introduced into numerous estuaries in New South Wales and the Adelaide region.)
- Elliston caulerpa Caulerpa ellistoni Womersley (Rottnest Island, Western Australia, to Kangaroo Island, South Australia.)
- Fishbone caulerpa Caulerpa distichophylla Sonder (Dongara to Albany, Western Australia.)
- Bootstrap caulerpa Caulerpa filiformis (Suringar) Hering (Sydney to Port Stephens (New South Wales). Also South Africa.)
- Long-filament caulerpa Caulerpa longifolia C. Agardh (Eucla, Western Australia, to Wilsons Promontory, Victoria, and around Tasmania.)
- Fine-filament caulerpa Caulerpa longifolia (form crispata) (Harvey) Womersley (Perth, Western Australia, to Waratah Bay, Victoria, and around Tasmania.)
- Three-cornered caulerpa Caulerpa trifaria Harvey (Cottesloe, Western Australia, to Western Port, Victoria, and around Tasmania.)
- Brown's caulerpa Caulerpa brownii (C. Agardh) Endlicher (Perth, Western Australia, to Walkerville, Victoria, and around Tasmania. Also New Zealand.)
- Bushy caulerpa Caulerpa obscura Sonder (Yanchep, Western Australia, to Walkerville, Victoria, and northern Tasmania.)
- Fern caulerpa Caulerpa flexilis Lamouroux (Geraldton, Western Australia, to Collaroy, New South Wales, and around Tasmania. Also New Zealand.)
- Mueller's fern caulerpa Caulerpa flexilis var. muelleri (Sonder) Womersley (Geraldton, Western Australia, to Waratah Bay, Victoria, and northern Tasmania.)
- Hedley's caulerpa Caulerpa hedleyi Weber van Bosse (Rottnest Island, Western Australia, to Kangaroo Island, South Australia.)
- Bubble caulerpa Caulerpa geminata Harvey (Dongara, Western Australia, to Bowen, Queensland, and around Tasmania. Also New Zealand.)
- Amulet caulerpa Caulerpa hodgkinsoniae J. Agardh (Robe, South Australia, to Walkerville, Victoria, and around Tasmania.)
- Cactus caulerpa Caulerpa cactoides (Turner) C. Agardh (Geraldton, Western Australia, to Richmond R, New South Wales, and around Tasmania.)
- Tropical caulerpa Caulerpa racemosa (Forsskål) J. Agardh (Tropical Australia south to Albany, Western Australia, and to northern New South Wales. Also Lord Howe Island and widespread overseas.)
- Beaded caulerpa Caulerpa vesiculifera Harvey (Shark Bay, Western Australia, to Phillip Island, Victoria, and northern Tasmania.)
- Pimpled caulerpa Caulerpa papillosa J. Agardh (Recherche Archipelago, Western Australia, to Walkerville, Victoria, and northern Tasmania.)
- Simple-branched caulerpa Caulerpa simpliciuscula (Turner) C. Agardh (Dongara, Western Australia, to Walkerville, Victoria, and around Tasmania.)

Family Bryopsidaceae

- Tufted bryopsis Bryopsis vestita J. Agardh (Cape Northumberland, South Australia, to Wilsons Promontory, Victoria, and around Tasmania. Also New Zealand.)
- Feather bryopsis Bryopsis gemellipara J. Agardh (Streaky Bay, South Australia, to Wilsons Promontory, Victoria, and around Tasmania.)

Family Polyphysaceae

- Mermaid's cup Acetabularia calyculus Lamouroux (Tropical Australia south to Adelaide, South Australia, and to Newcastle, New South Wales. Also widespread overseas.)
- Green eyeballs Derbesia marina (Lyngbye) Solier (Scott Bay, South Australia, to Sorrento, Victoria, and southeastern Tasmania. Also widespread overseas.)

=== Phylum Magnoliophyta ===
(Angiosperms)

Family Hydrocharitaceae

- Southern paddlegrass Halophila australis Doty & Stone (Dongara, Western Australia, to Sydney, New South Wales, and around Tasmania.)
- Oval paddlegrass Halophila ovalis (R. Brown) J.D. Hooker (Tropical Australia south to Cowaramup Bay, Western Australia, and to Twofold Bay, New South Wales, Also widespread in the Indo-West Pacific region.)
- Delicate paddlegrass Halophila decipiens Ostenfeld (Tropical Australia south to Albany, Western Australia, and to Mallacoota, Victoria. Also widespread in the Indo-West Pacific region.)

Family Potamogetonaceae

- Swangrass Ruppia megacarpa Mason (Peel Inlet, Western Australia, to Jervis Bay, New South Wales, and around Tasmania. Also New Zealand.)

Family Posidoniaceae

- Southern strapweed Posidonia australis Hooker (Shark Bay, Western Australia, to Lake Macquarie, New South Wales, and along the northern coast of Tasmania.)
- Fibrous strapweed Posidonia angustifolia Cambridge & Kuo (Houtman Abrolhos, Western Australia, to Port MacDonnell, South Australia, and northern Tasmania.)
- Smooth strapweed Posidonia sinuosa Cambridge & Kuo (Shark Bay, Western Australia, to Kingston, South Australia.)
- Den Hartog's strapweed Posidonia denhartogii Kuo & Cambridge (Perth, Western Australia, to Backstairs Passage, South Australia.)
- Thin-leafed strapweed Posidonia coriacea Cambridge & Kuo (Shark Bay, Western Australia, to Backstairs Passage, South Australia.)
- Robertson's strapweed Posidonia robertsonae Kuo & Cambridge (Cape Leeuwin to Israelite Bay, Western Australia.)

Family Cymodoceaceae

- Tubular seagrass Syringodium isoetifolium (Ascherson) Dandy (Tropical Australia south to Garden Island, Western Australia, and to Moreton Bay, Queensland. Also widespread in the Indo-Pacific region.)
- Reef seagrass Thalassodendron pachyrhizum den Hartog (Geraldton to Bremer Bay, Western Australia.)
- Sea nymph, wireweed Amphibolis antarctica (Labillardière) Sonder & Ascherson ex Ascherson (Carnarvon, Western Australia, to Wilsons Promontory, Victoria, and south to Maria Island, Tasmania.)
- Griffith's sea nymph Amphibolis griffithii (J. Black) den Hartog (Champion Bay, Western Australia, to Victor Harbor, South Australia.)

Family Zosteraceae

- Tasmanian eelgrass Heterozostera tasmanica (Martens ex Ascherson) den Hartog (Younghusband Peninsula, South Australia, to Wilsons Promontory, Victoria, and around Tasmania.)
- Black-stemmed eelgrass Heterozostera nigricaulis Kuo (Dongara, Western Australia, to Port Stephens (New South Wales), and around Tasmania.)
- Mueller's eelgrass Zostera muelleri Irmisch ex Ascherson (Perth, Western Australia, to southern Queensland and around Tasmania. Also New Zealand.)

=== Mangroves ===
- Grey mangrove Avicennia marina (Forsskål) Vierhapper (Around mainland Australia. Also Lord Howe Island.)
- River mangrove Aegiceras corniculatum (Linnaeus) Blanco (Tropical Australia south to Shark Bay, Western Australia, and to Merimbula, New South Wales. Also Lord Howe Island.)

=== Saltmarsh plants ===
- Beaded glasswort Sarcocornia quinqueflora (Bunge ex Ungern-Sternberg) A.J. Scott (Around the Australian mainland and Tasmania.)

== Geographical location of places listed in the range statements ==
- Abrolhos Island
- Adelaide South Australia. 34.92889°S 138.60083°E
- Albany, Western Australia 35.0228°S 117.8814°E
- Apollo Bay, Victoria 38.750°S 143.650°E
- Arrawarra, New South Wales 30.05812°S 153.20680°E
- Augusta, Western Australia 34.312°S 115.159°E
- Backstairs Passage, South Australia 35.6908°S 138.0686°E
- Ballina, New South Wales 28.83333°S 153.53333°E
- Bermagui, New South Wales36.41667°S 150.06667°E
- Bicheno, Tasmania 41.867°S 148.283°E
- Botany Bay, New South Wales 33.99778°S 151.23278°E
- Bowen, Queensland20.017°S 148.233°E
- Bremer Bay, Western Australia34.394°S 119.376°E
- Bruny Island, Tasmania43.367°S 147.283°E
- Busselton, Western Australia33.64778°S 115.34583°E
- Calliope River, Queensland 23°50′S 151°13′E
- Caloundra, Queensland 26.800°S 153.133°E
- Canal Rocks, Western Australia33.66803°S 114.99387°E
- Cape Buffon, South Australia 37.56528°S 140.10778°E
- Cape Jaffa, South Australia36.95784°S 139.67009°E
- Cape Leeuwin, Western Australia 34.37417°S 115.13583°E
- Cape Naturaliste, Western Australia 33.53139°S 115.00444°E
- Cape Northumberland, South Australia 38.06083°S 140.66250°E
- Cape Otway, Victoria 38.850°S 143.517°E
- Cape Riche, Western Australia 34.608°S 118.750°E
- Cape Woolamai, Victoria 38.52611°S 145.33694°E
- Carnarvon, Western Australia24.884°S 113.661°E
- Ceduna, South Australia 32.117°S 133.667°E
- Champion Bay, Western Australia 28.750°S 114.600°E
- Coffs Harbour, New South Wales30.30228°S 153.118896°E
- Coles Bay, Tasmania 42.11667°S 148.28333°E
- Collaroy, New South Wales33.730°S 151.300°E
- Cottesloe, Western Australia31.993°S 115.757°E
- Cowaramup, Western Australia33.85°S 115.11°E
- Crookhaven Heads, New South Wales 34.89917°S 150.77028°E
- Dampier, Western Australia 20.66°S 116.71°E
- Darwin, Northern Territory12.45000°S 130.83333°E
- D'Entrecasteaux Channel, Tasmania43.217°S 147.283°E
- Dongara, Western Australia29.25°S 114.93°E
- Dunalley, Tasmania 42.88333°S 147.80000°E
- Eden, New South Wales37.06667°S 149.90000°E
- Elliston, South Australia33.65000°S 134.88333°E
- Encounter Bay, South Australia 35.583°S 138.733°E
- The Entrance, New South Wales 33.34722°S 151.49611°E
- Esperance, Western Australia33.861°S 121.892°E
- Eucla, Western Australia31.675°S 128.883°E
- Fishery Bay, South Australia 34.91500°S 135.68528°E
- Flinders Island, Tasmania40.000°S 148.117°E
- Flinders, Victoria38.474°S 145.022°E
- Fremantle Western Australia. 32.05694°S 115.74389°E
- Freycinet Peninsula, Tasmania 42.21°S 148.305278°E
- Gabo Island, Victoria 37.559067°S 149.911375°E
- Garden Island, Western Australia32°11′36″S 115°40′16″E
- Geographe Bay, Western Australia33.583°S 115.250°E
- George Town, Tasmania 41.10000°S 146.81667°E
- Geraldton, Western Australia28.77917°S 114.61444°E
- Great Australian Bight, South Australia 33°S 130°E
- Green Cape, New South Wales 37.258°S 150.046°E
- Green Head, Western Australia 30.050°S 114.967°E
- Gulf St Vincent South Australia 35°S 138°E
- Hamelin Bay, Western Australia 34°13′52″S 115°02′49″E
- Heron Island, Queensland 23.4420000°S 151.9140000°E
- Hobart, Tasmania 42.88056°S 147.32500°E
- Hogan Island, Tasmania 39°13′17″S 146°59′9″E
- Houtman Abrolhos 28.717°S 113.783°E
- Inverloch, Victoria 38.6334°S 145.7872°E
- Jervis Bay, New South Wales 35.11972°S 150.73250°E
- Kalbarri, Western Australia 27.71°S 114.16°E
- Kangaroo Island, South Australia 35.833°S 137.250°E
- Kent Group, Tasmania 39.46667°S 147.30833°E
- Keppel Bay, Queensland 39.46667°S 147.30833°E
- King Island, Tasmania 39.867°S 143.983°E
- Kingston, South Australia 36°49′S 139°51′E
- Lake Conjola, New South Wales 35.26667°S 150.48333°E
- Lake Macquarie, New South Wales 33°05′S 151°35′E
- Lord Howe Island 31.550°S 159.083°E
- Mallacoota, Victoria 37.550°S 149.750°E
- Mallacoota Point, Victoria 37.57333°S 149.76556°E
- Mandurah, Western Australia 32.52889°S 115.72306°E
- Maria Island, Tasmania42.633°S 148.083°E
- Marion Bay, Tasmania42.797°S 147.923°E
- Merimbula, New South Wales 36.89806°S 149.90111°E
- Monte Bello Islands, Western Australia 20.417°S 115.533°E
- Moreton Bay, Queensland27.250°S 153.250°E
- Musselroe Bay, Tasmania 40.82694°S 148.15444°E
- Narooma, New South Wales 36.20000°S 150.13333°E
- Newcastle, New South Wales 32.917°S 151.750°E
- Nickol Bay, Western Australia 20.63610°S 116.88274°E
- Norah Head, New South Wales 33.28139°S 151.57861°E
- Noosa, Queensland 26.38861°S 153.034806°E
- Norfolk Island 29.03°S 167.95°E
- Nowra, New South Wales 34.88333°S 150.60000°E
- Nuyts Reef, South Australia 32.11722°S 132.14972°E
- Orford, Tasmania 42.55000°S 147.86667°E
- Pearson Island, South Australia33.75000°S 134.50000°E
- Peel Inlet, Western Australia 32.617°S 115.650°E
- Perth, Western Australia31.95222°S 115.85889°E
- Phillip Island, Victoria 38.483°S 145.233°E
- Point Hicks, Victoria 37.80306°S 149.27556°E
- Point Lonsdale, Victoria 38.283°S 144.600°E
- Point Roadnight, Victoria (Point Roadknight? 38.42861°S 144.18528°E)
- Point Sinclair, South Australia 32.10456°S 132.97978°E
- Point Westall, South Australia
- Port Davey, Tasmania 43.33°S 145.94°E
- Port Elliott, South Australia (Port Elliot, South Australia? 35.51667°S 138.66667°E)
- Port Gawler, South Australia 34.633°S 138.494°E
- Port Gregory, Western Australia 28.18333°S 114.25000°E
- Port Jackson, New South Wales 33.85833°S 151.23333°E
- Port MacDonnell, South Australia 38.05000°S 140.68333°E
- Port Macquarie, New South Wales 31.43333°S 152.90000°E
- Port Noarlunga, South Australia 35.150°S 138.467°E
- Port Phillip Bay, Victoria 38.150°S 144.867°E
- Port Phillip Heads, Victoria 38.27917°S 144.71528°E
- Port Phillip, Victoria. 38.150°S 144.867°E
- Port River, South Australia 34.750°S 138.500°E
- Port Sinclair, South Australia (Point Sinclair? q.v.)
- Port Stanvac, South Australia 35.1097°S 138.4694°E
- Port Stephens (New South Wales) 32.69917°S 152.12389°E
- Port Willunga, South Australia 35.266°S 138.465°E
- Portland, Victoria 38.333°S 141.600°E
- Portsea, Victoria| 38.320°S 144.713°E
- Queenscliff, Victoria 38.267°S 144.650°E
- Recherche Archipelago, Western Australia 33.917°S 121.883°E
- Recherche Bay, Tasmania 43.533°S 146.900°E
- Redcliff, Queensland(Redcliffe? 27.2258°S 153.1063°E )
- Richmond River, New South Wales 28.883°S 153.583°E
- Robe, South Australia37.150°S 139.750°E
- Rockingham, Western Australia32.281°S 115.727°E
- Rottnest Island, Western Australia32°00′07″S 115°31′01″E
- Safety Bay, Western Australia 32.304°S 115.721°E
- San Remo, Victoria 38°31′0″S 145°22′0″E
- Scott Bay, South Australia
- Shark Bay, Western Australia. 25.500°S 113.500°E
- Shellharbour, New South Wales34.583°S 150.867°E
- Sleaford Bay, South Australia 34.89611°S 135.77528°E
- Sorrento, Victoria 38.33889°S 144.74083°E
- Southern Great Barrier Reef, Queensland
- Spencer Gulf, South Australia 34.417°S 136.750°E
- Spring Bay, Tasmania 42.52975°S 147.91722°E
- Stradbroke Island, Queensland 27.53278°S 153.4598444°E
- Streaky Bay, South Australia32.79722°S 134.21111°E
- Sydney, New South Wales 33.859972°S 151.21111°E
- Tathra, New South Wales36.73333°S 149.96667°E
- Terrigal, New South Wales33.448011°S 151.444461°E
- Tuggerah Lakes, New South Wales 33.29944°S 151.50111°E
- Twofold Bay, New South Wales 37.067°S 149.900°E
- Ulladulla, New South Wales 35.34861°S 150.46778°E
- Venus Bay, South Australia 33.21667°S 134.66667°E
- Victor Harbor, South Australia 35.55000°S 138.61667°E
- Walkerville, Victoria 38.85000°S 145.98333°E
- Walpole, Western Australia 34.98°S 116.7°E
- Waratah Bay, Victoria 38.86667°S 146.00000°E
- Warrnambool, Victoria 38.38°S 142.48°E
- Waterhouse Point, Tasmania 40.82087°S 147.66960°E
- Waterloo Bay, South Australia 33.65000°S 134.88333°E
- Wedge Island, South Australia 35.1554°S 136.4649°E
- West Bay, Kangaroo Island, South Australia 35.89056°S 136.54056°E
- West Island, South Australia 35.60833°S 138.59167°E
- Western Port, Victoria 38.367°S 145.333°E
- Whitsunday Group, Queensland 20.300°S 148.933°E
- Whitford Beach, Western Australia 31.79500°S 115.73194°E
- Williamstown, Victoria37.861°S 144.885°E
- Wilsons Promontory, Victoria 39°02′S 146°23′E
- Wollongong, New South Wales34°25′59″S 150°52′59″E
- Wynyard, Tasmania41.00000°S 145.71667°E
- Yallingup, Western Australia 33.64°S 115.03°E
- Yanchep, Western Australia31.55°S 115.634°E
- Yorke Peninsula, South Australia 34.667°S 137.667°E
- Younghusband Peninsula, South Australia 36.00000°S 139.50000°E

== See also ==
- List of marine animals of Australia (temperate waters)
- List of seaweeds of South Africa
- List of seaweeds of the Cape Peninsula and False Bay
