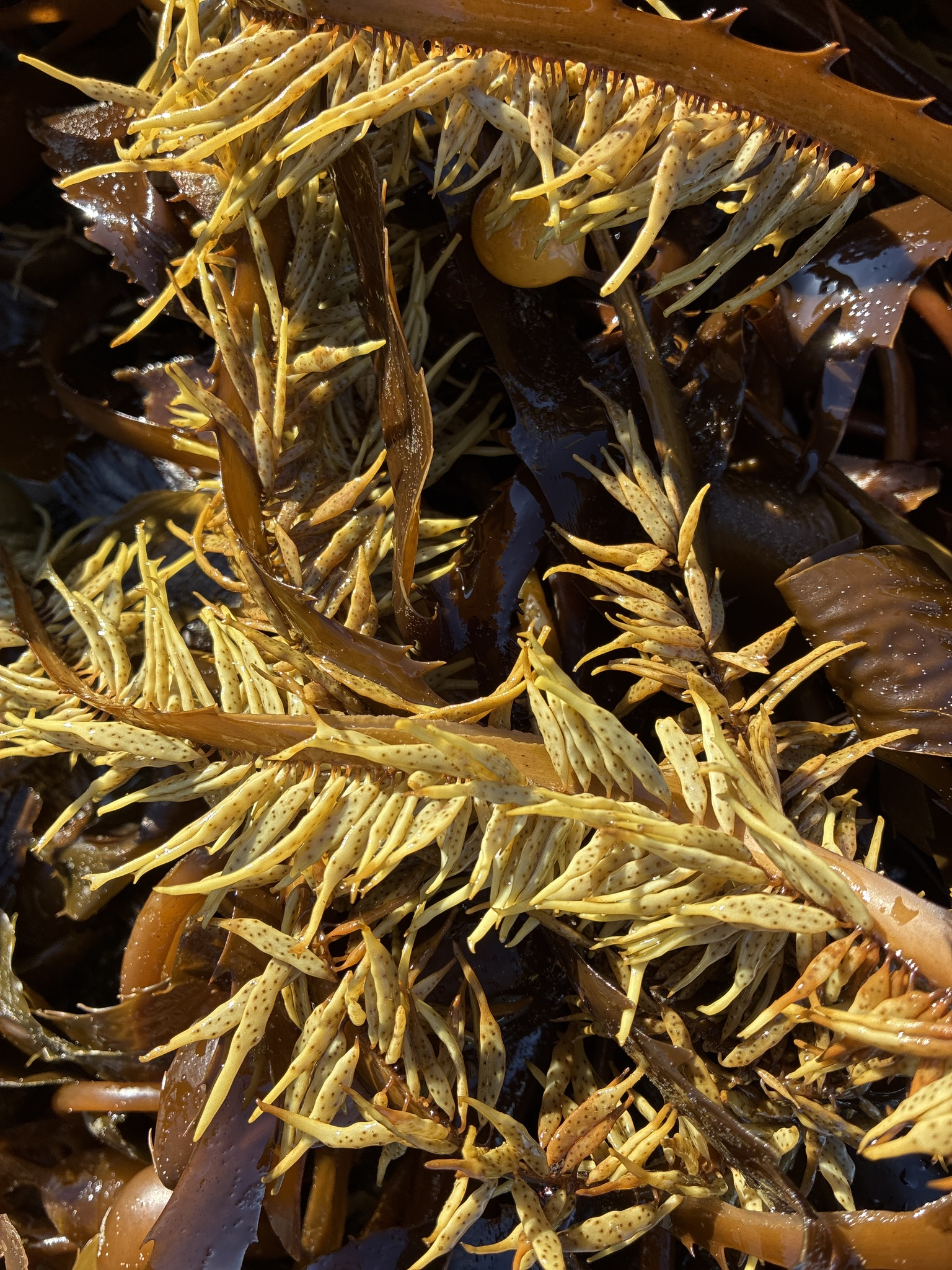
- Marginariella urvilliana

Scientific classification
- Domain: Eukaryota
- Clade: Sar
- Clade: Stramenopiles
- Phylum: Ochrophyta
- Class: Phaeophyceae
- Order: Fucales
- Family: Seirococcaceae
- Genus: Marginariella; Tandy

Type species
- Marginariella urvilleana (A. Richard) Tandy

= Marginariella =

Genus of algae

Marginariella is a genus of brown algae in the order Fucales. All three members of the genus are endemic to the New Zealand region.

== Description ==
Marginariella species consist of a holdfast bearing multiple blades. The margins of the blades bear receptacles and, in the case of M. boryana and M. urvilliana, pneumatocysts. The presence and form of the pneumatocysts can be used as a character to differentiate among the species.

== Etymology ==
The genus was initially named Marginaria as it bears floats and receptacles on its frond margins. This name was later found to be preoccupied by a genus of ferns, thus the algae were renamed Marginariella.

== Taxonomy ==
Marginariella contains the following species:

- Marginariella parsonsii
- Marginariella urvilliana
- Marginariella boryana
