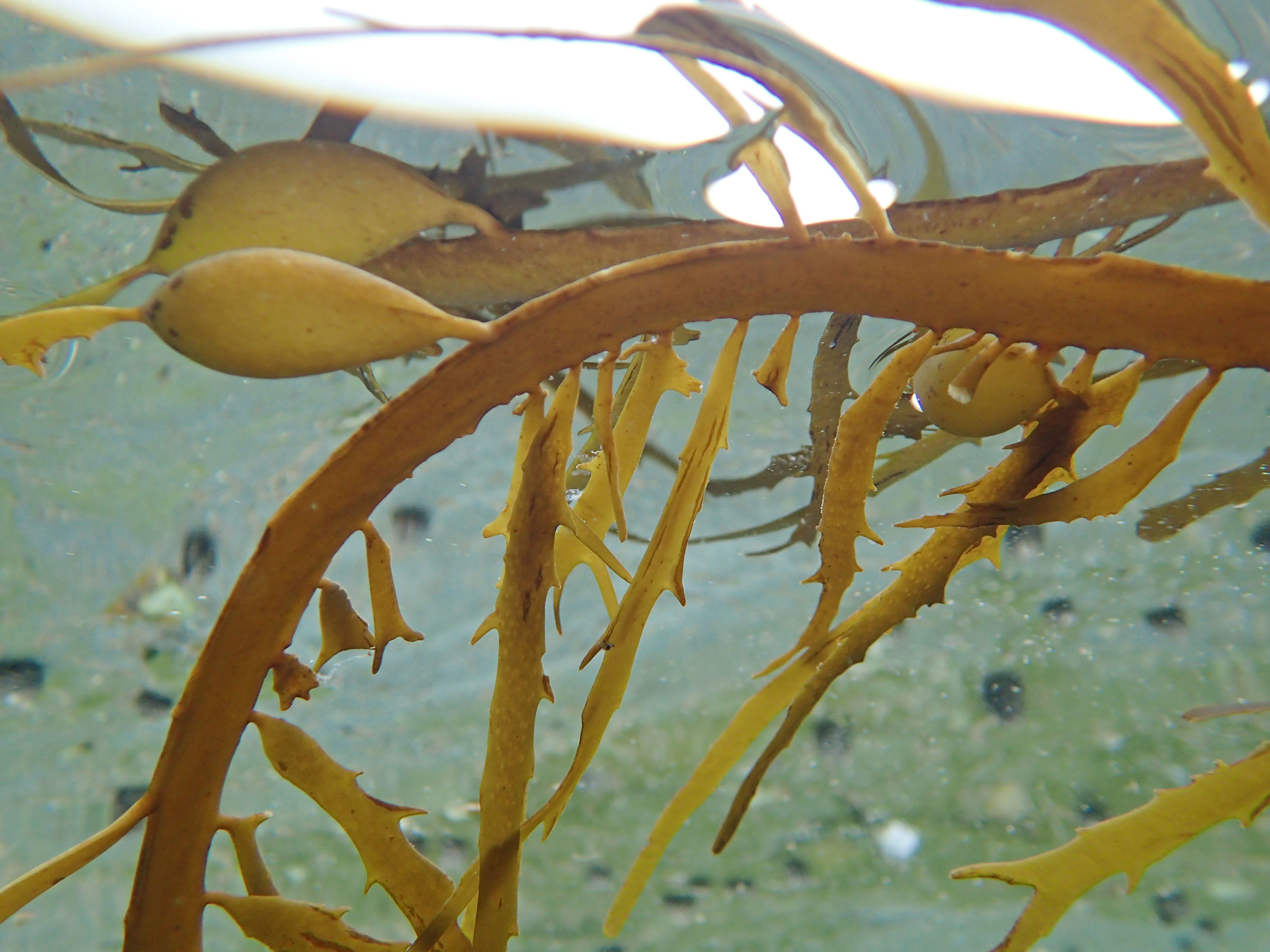
- Phyllospora comosa

Scientific classification
- Domain: Eukaryota
- Clade: Diaphoretickes
- Clade: SAR
- Clade: Stramenopiles
- Phylum: Gyrista
- Subphylum: Ochrophytina
- Class: Phaeophyceae
- Order: Fucales
- Family: Seirococcaceae
- Genus: Phyllospora; C.Agardh 1839

Type species
- Phyllospora comosa

= Phyllospora =

Genus in Seirococcaceae

Phyllospora is a genus of seaweeds in the family Seirococcaceae (among the brown algae).

Five species are currently accepted:

- Phyllospora chamissoi C.Agardh, 1839
- Phyllospora comosa (Labillardière) C.Agardh, 1839
- Phyllospora obtusa (Harvey) Endlicher
- Phyllospora menziesii (Turner) C.Agardh, 1839 accepted as Egregia menziesii (Turner) Areschoug, 1876 (synonym)
- Phyllospora quercifolia (Turner) Harvey (uncertain)
