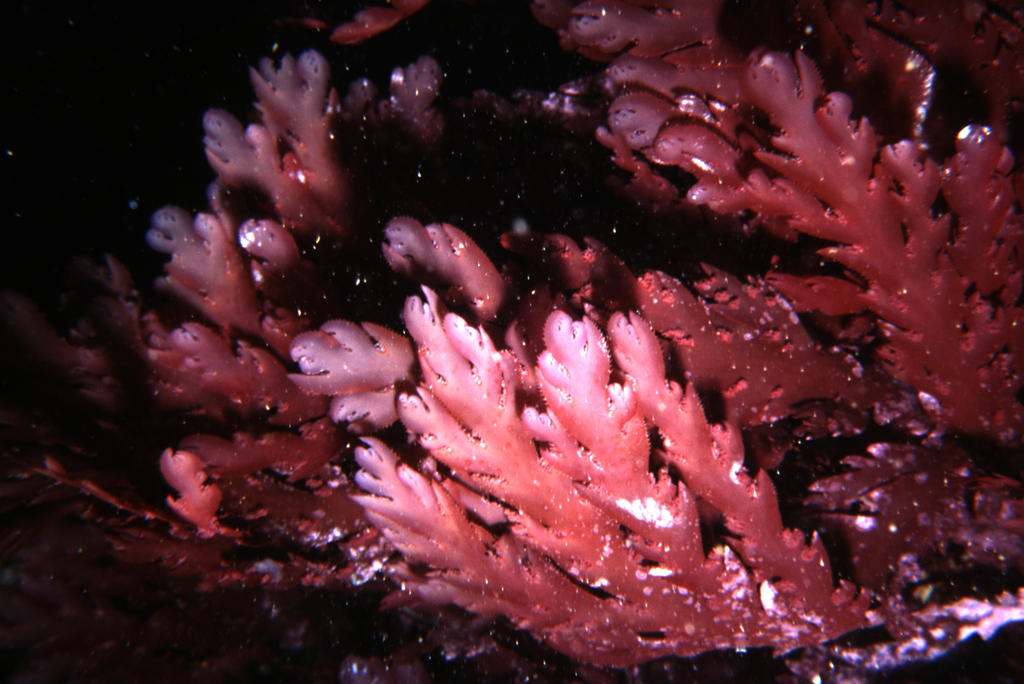
- Plocamium corallorhiza from South Africa

Scientific classification
- Domain: Eukaryota
- Clade: Archaeplastida
- Division: Rhodophyta
- Class: Florideophyceae
- Order: Plocamiales
- Family: Plocamiaceae
- Genus: Plocamium; J.V. Lamouroux, 1813

Type species
- Fucus cartilagineus Linnaeus, 1753

= Plocamium =

Genus of algae

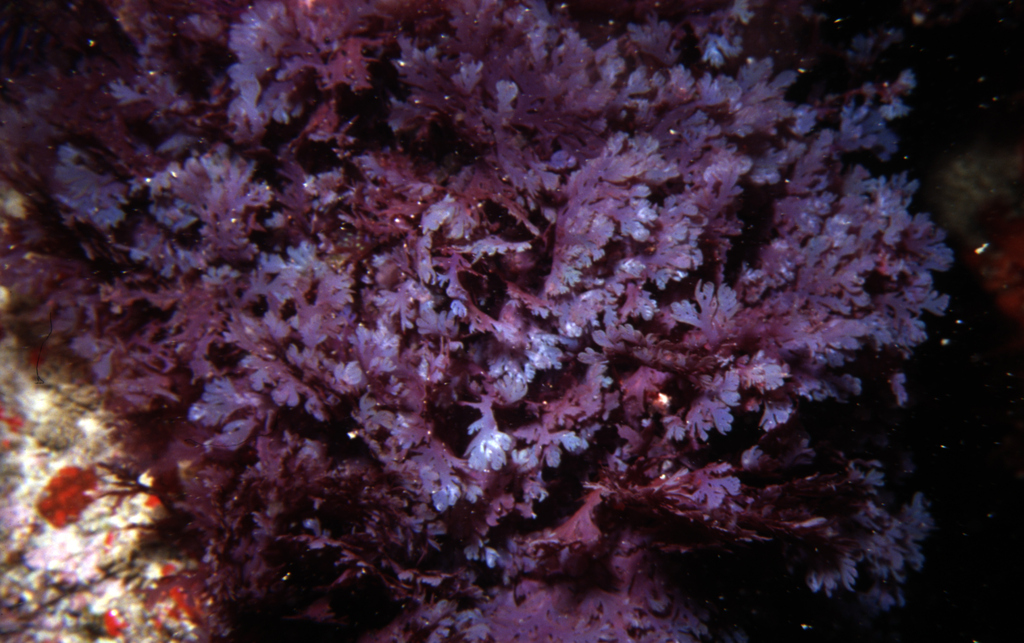

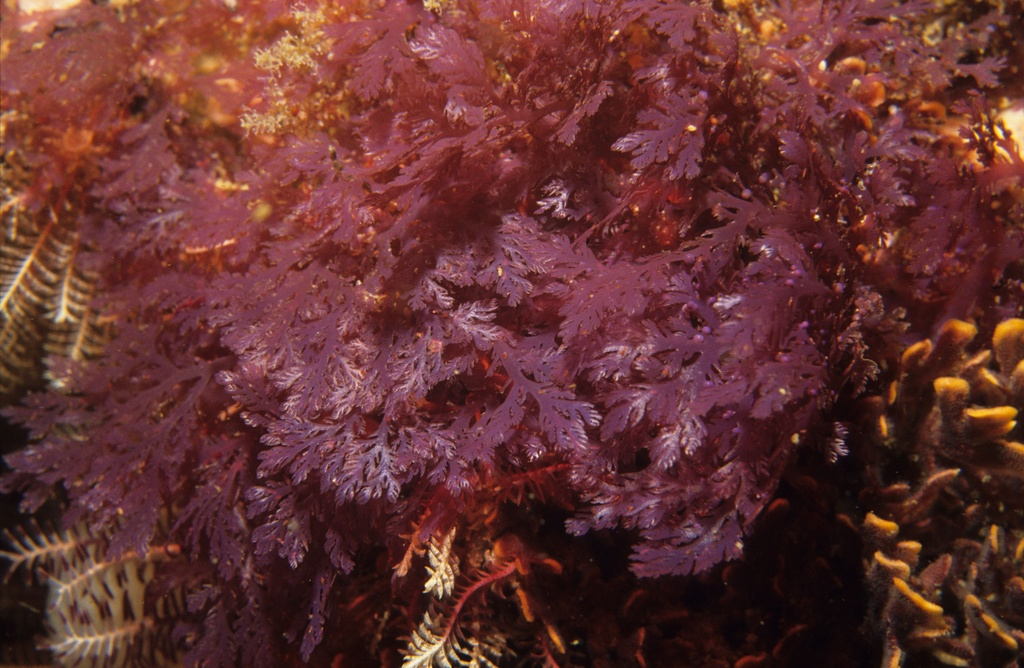
Plocamium sp. from South Africa

Plocamium is a genus of red algae in the family Plocamiaceae. It contains around 40 species and has a cosmopolitan distribution in temperate seas, although it is most diverse in the Southern Hemisphere. It is widely distributed in tropical and also warm-temperate and cold-temperate seas, such as northern Europe, the northern Arabian Sea and western Australia. They are also found in the Antarctic regions of Admiralty Bay (maritime Antarctica, Antarctic Peninsula) and Terra Nova Bay (in the Ross Sea).

== Description ==
Plocamium has erect elliptical thalli that grow up to 50 cm (20 in) in length. They are bright red in color with strongly flattened delicately branching fronds that further divide into two to five smaller branchlets. Cystocarps (fruiting parts) are either scattered along the frond margins or found on special short fertile branches, and lack a specialized pore for carpospore release. Tetrasporangia are borne in specialized stichidia (branches of the thallus) of various morphologies.

== Accepted species ==
Species classified under the genus include the following:

- Plocamium affine Kützing, 1849
- Plocamium angustum (J.Agardh) J.D.Hooker & Harvey, 1847
- Plocamium beckeri F.Schmitz ex Simons, 1964
- Plocamium brachiocarpum Kützing, 1849
- Plocamium brasiliense (Greville) M.A.Howe & W.R.Taylor, 1931
- Plocamium cartilagineum (Linnaeus) P.S.Dixon, 1967
- Plocamium cirrhosum (Turner) M.J.Wynne, 2002
- Plocamium corallorhiza (Turner) J.D.Hooker & Harvey, 1845
- Plocamium cornutum (Turner) Harvey, 1849
- Plocamium cruciferum Harvey, 1855
- Plocamium delicatulum Baardseth, 1941
- Plocamium dilatatum J.Agardh, 1876
- Plocamium fimbriatum M.J.Wynne, 2002
- Plocamium fuscorubrum Baardseth, 1941
- Plocamium glomeratum J.Agardh, 1851
- Plocamium hamatum J.Agardh, 1876
- Plocamium hookeri Harvey, 1845
- Plocamium leptophyllum Kützing, 1849
- Plocamium maggsiae G.W.Saunders & K.V.Lehmkuhl, 2005
- Plocamium maxillosum (Poiret) J.V.Lamouroux, 1813
- Plocamium mertensii (Greville) Harvey, 1847
- Plocamium microcladioides G.R.South & N.M.Adams, 1979
- Plocamium minutum Levring, 1944
- Plocamium nanum G.W.Saunders & K.V.Lehmkuhl, 2005
- Plocamium oregonum Doty, 1947
- Plocamium ovicornis Okamura, 1896
- Plocamium patagiatum J.Agardh, 1894
- Plocamium patens G.Martens, 1868
- Plocamium preissianum Sonder, 1845
- Plocamium raphelisianum P.J.L.Dangeard, 1949
- Plocamium recurvatum Okamura, 1913
- Plocamium rigidum Bory de Saint-Vincent, 1834
- Plocamium sandvicense J.Agardh, 1892
- Plocamium secundatum(Kützing) Kützing, 1866
- Plocamium serratulum Okamura
- Plocamium serrulatumOkamura, 1932
- Plocamium suhrii Kützing, 1849
- Plocamium telfairiae (W.J.Hooker & Harvey) Harvey ex Kützing, 1849
- Plocamium violaceum Farlow, 1877

Nomina dubia:

- Plocamium concinnum Areschoug
- Plocamium froelichianum Kützing
- Plocamium subtile Kützing, 1866
