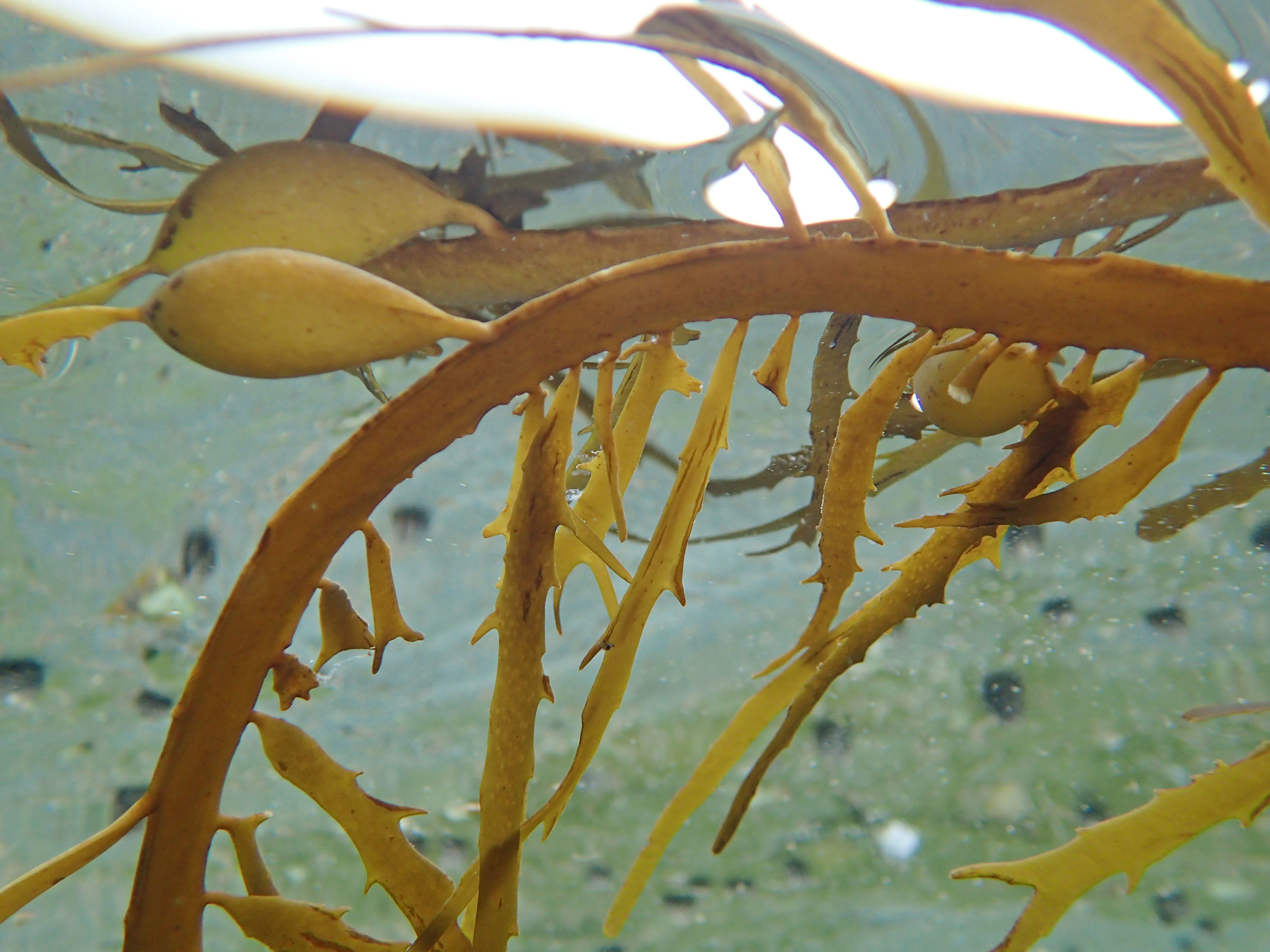

Scientific classification
- Domain: Eukaryota
- Clade: Diaphoretickes
- Clade: Sar
- Clade: Stramenopiles
- Phylum: Gyrista
- Subphylum: Ochrophytina
- Class: Phaeophyceae
- Order: Fucales
- Family: Seirococcaceae
- Genus: Phyllospora
- Species: P. comosa

Binomial name
- Phyllospora comosa (Labillardière) C.Agardh, 1839

= Phyllospora comosa =

Species of brown seaweed

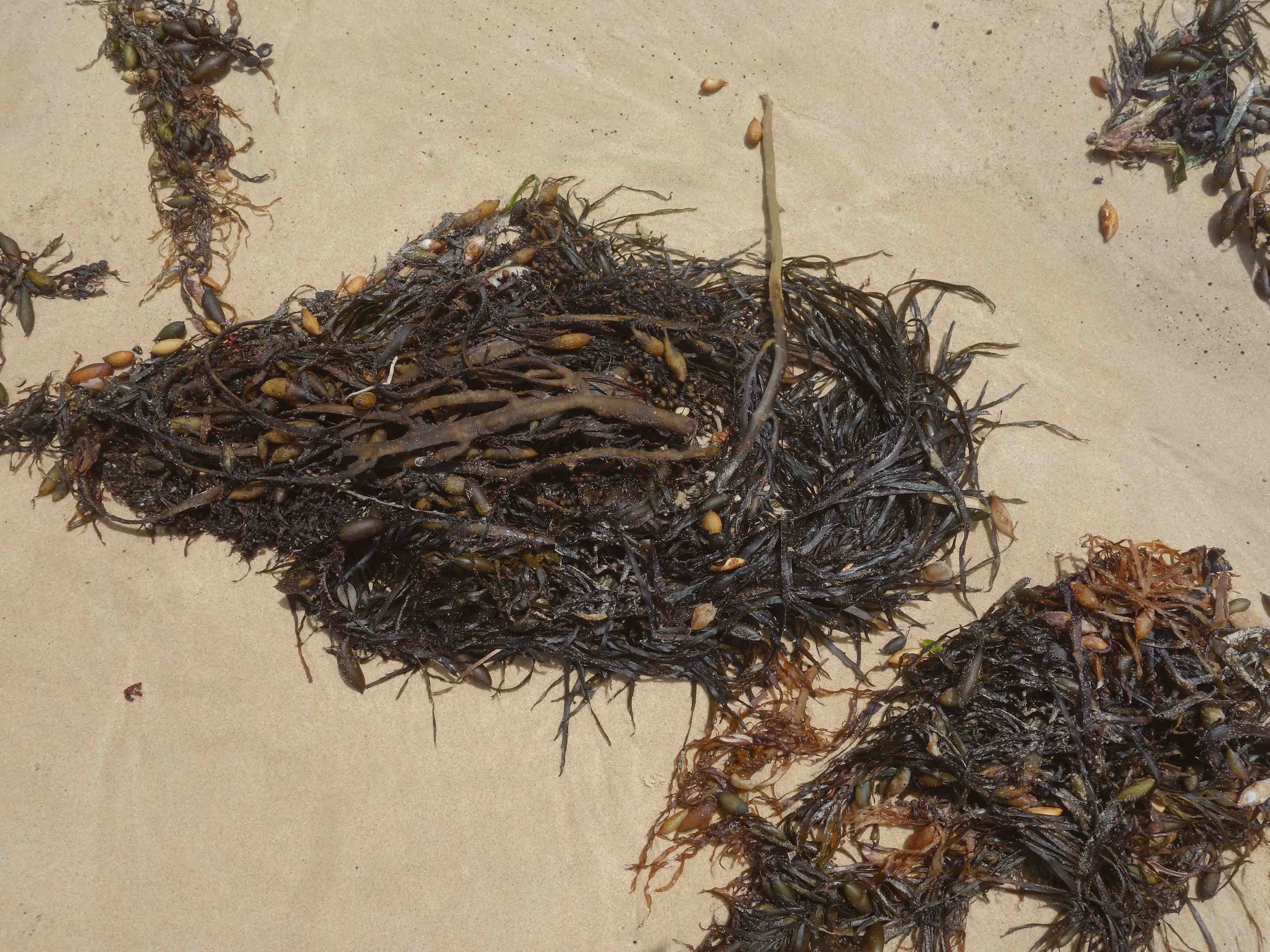
Phyllospora comosa on a beach on the southern coast of NSW

Phyllospora comosa, known as crayweed, is a species of brown algae in the Seirococcaceae family. It forms temperate seaweed forests that are important as habitat for many marine species and also for producing oxygen and capturing atmospheric carbon.

== Taxonomy ==
Phyllospora comosa is commonly known as crayweed. It is a species of brown algae in the Seirococcaceae family.

== Description ==
Crayweed grows up to 2.5 m (8 ft 2 in) in length and forms dense, shallow forests.

== Distribution ==
Crayweed is found in the oceans around Australia and New Zealand. It is abundant in cooler waters along the south-eastern coastline of Australia, around Tasmania and in South Australia. It occurs to a depth of around five metres (16 ft) on the east coast and farther south to about three metres (9.8 ft). On some Tasmanian coasts it can occur depths of at 18 metres (59 ft). It used to occur around Sydney, but disappeared from metropolitan areas under pressure from human activities during the 1970s and 1980s.

The algae have a central main axis, usually up to 3 m (9.8 ft) long, which bear many branches along their length, with closely arranged, leaf-like laterals. Some laterals have conceptacles, in which develop cells which produce sperm and eggs. The strongly seasonal growth of the algae depends on the length of daylight; it occurs from apical cells and is restricted to the top 20–30 cm (7.9–11.8 in) of the branches.

== Ecological significance ==
Crayweed forests are important as habitat for many marine species and also for producing oxygen and capturing atmospheric carbon.

== Conservation efforts in Sydney ==
A conservation effort known as "Operation Crayweed" has been working to re-establish the species in the waters around Sydney. Transplants have been established at sites including Malabar, Coogee, Little Bay, Freshwater, and Bondi; other transplants were being planned for Newport and Dee Why as of January 2020.

In 2022 Operation Crayweed was absorbed into a larger biodiversity restoration project, led by the Sydney Institute of Marine Science, called Project Restore, with funding from the NSW Government.
