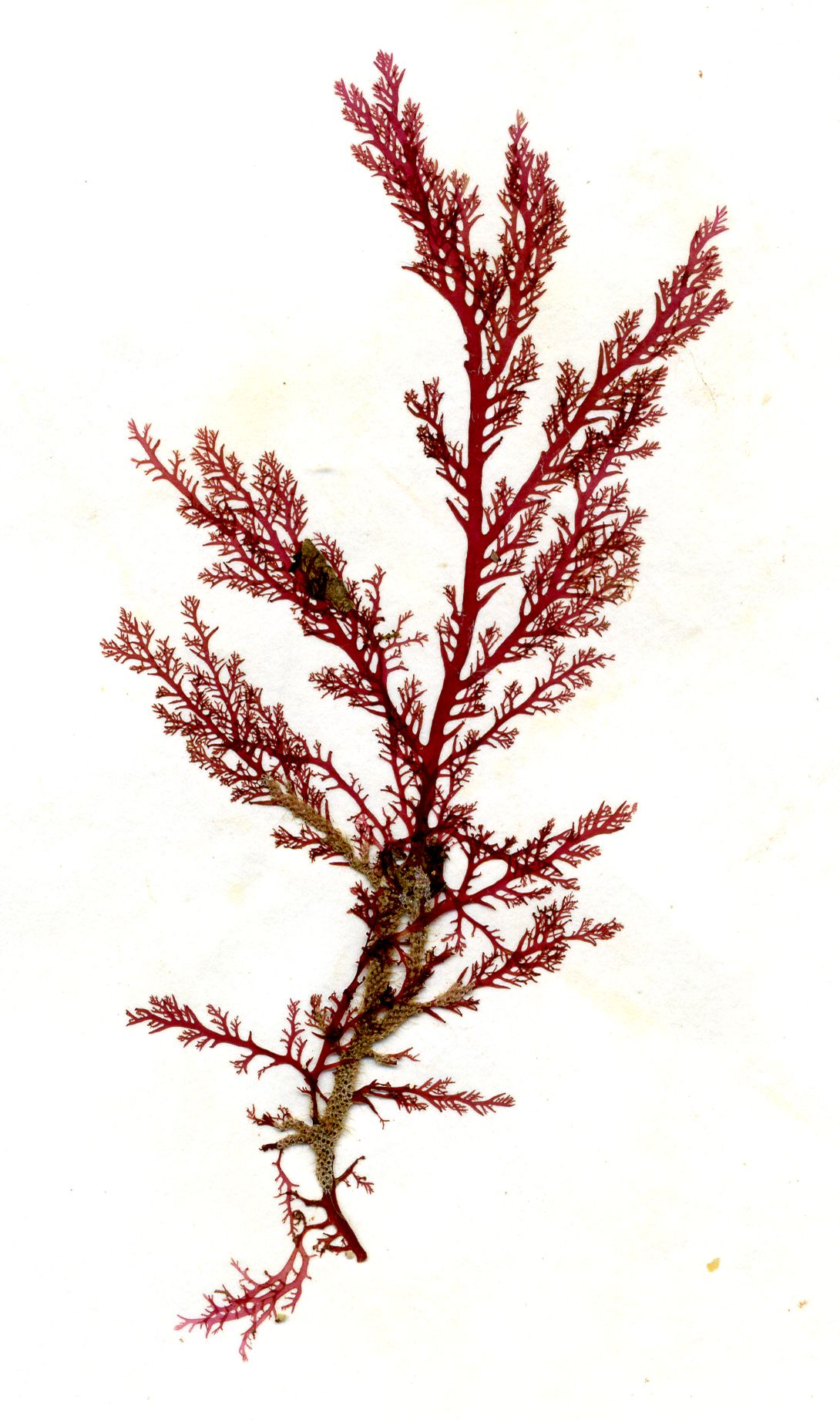
- Plocamium cartilagineum herbarium sheet

Scientific classification
- Clade: Archaeplastida
- Division: Rhodophyta
- Class: Florideophyceae
- Order: Plocamiales
- Family: Plocamiaceae
- Genus: Plocamium
- Species: P. cartilagineum

Binomial name
- Plocamium cartilagineum (Linnaeus) P.S.Dixon

= Plocamium cartilagineum =

Species of alga

Plocamium cartilagineum is a medium-sized red marine alga.

== Description ==
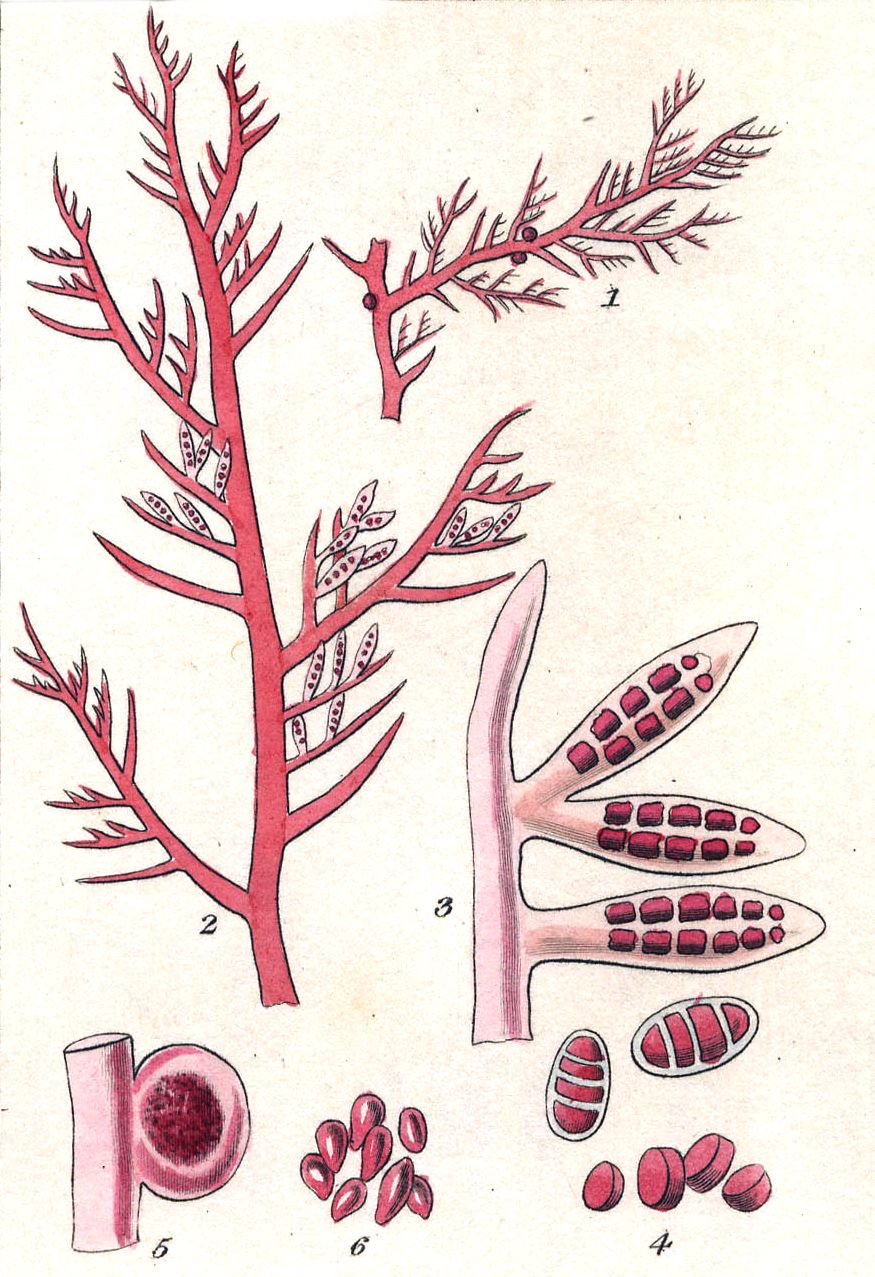
Plocamium cartilagineum Miller

Plocamium cartilagineum is an erect red alga growing to 10 cm in length. The main axes is flattened with regular flattened branches on both sides. The branches are long and short alternately, the short ones on one side are opposite the longer on the other side. These longer branches bear two or three short curved branches in series, comb-like. The plants are fully corticated. This branching pattern is similar to Plocamium lyngyanum and Plocamium maggsiae the other European species which have only recently been distinguished.

== Habitat ==
Common on rock in the lower littoral and deeper to 30.

== Reproduction ==
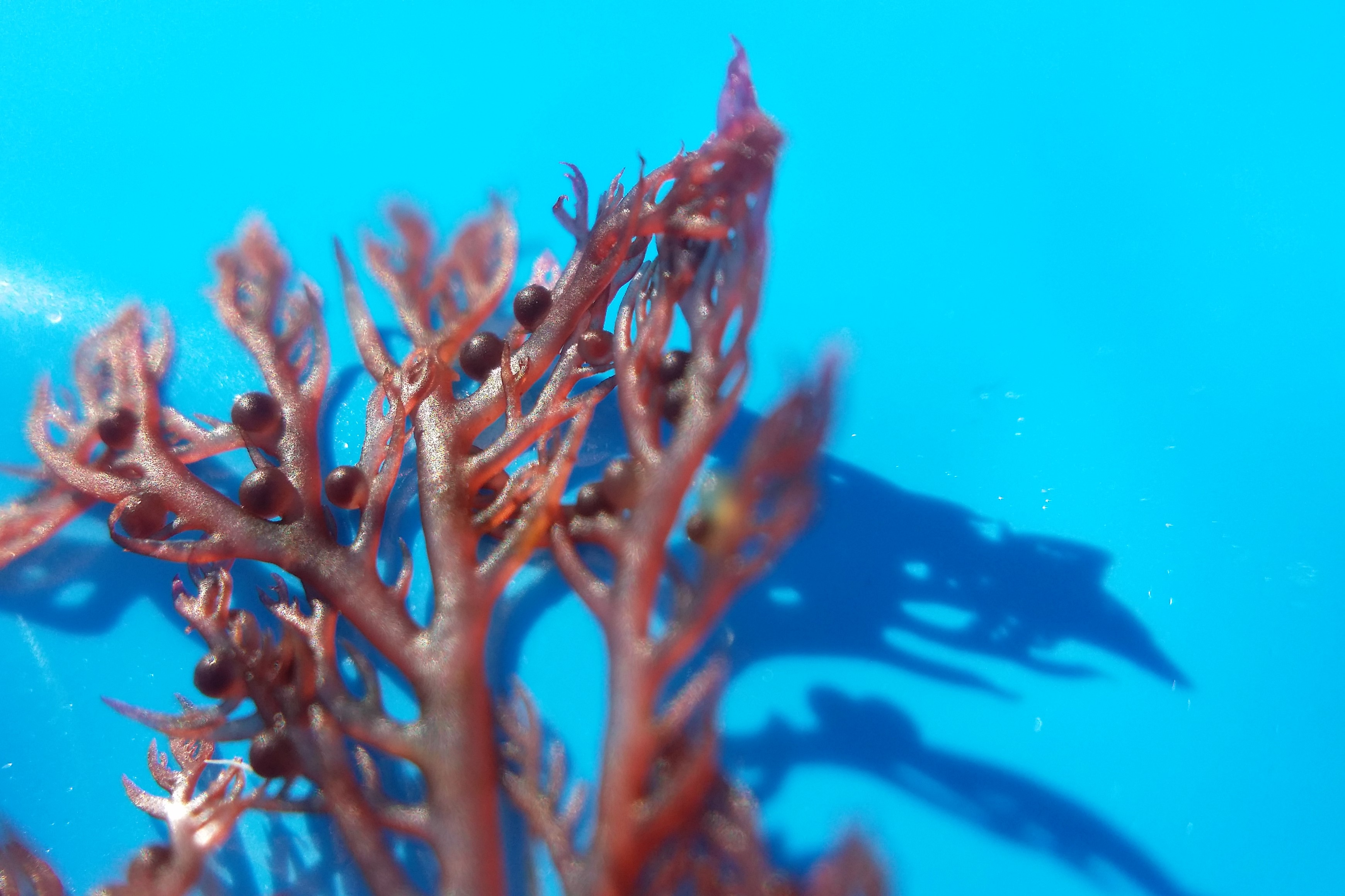
Apical parts of a thalli of the red seaweed Plocamium cartilagineum, with female reproductive structures (cystocarps) visible.

The plants are dioecious. The male structures are microscopic. The female cystocarps grow to 1 mm in diameter and are on the margins of the frond. The spermatangia are within the youngest branches in sori. The tetrasporangia are microscopic.

== Distribution ==
Common all around the British Isles including Shetland and Channel Islands.Faeroes and Norway to Senegal, Mediterranean and Canary Isles.
