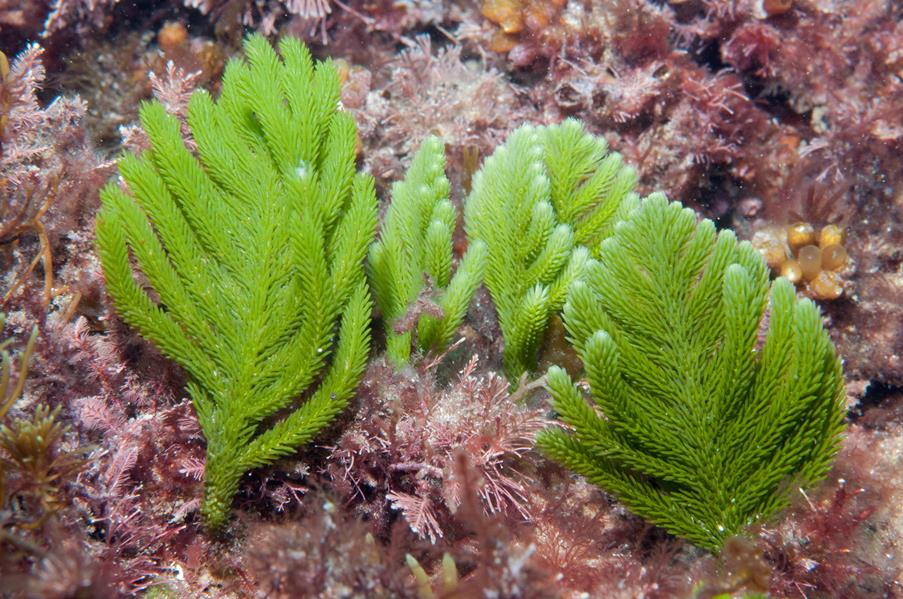

Scientific classification
- Kingdom: Plantae
- Division: Chlorophyta
- Class: Ulvophyceae
- Order: Bryopsidales
- Family: Caulerpaceae
- Genus: Caulerpa
- Species: C. flexilis

Binomial name
- Caulerpa flexilis J.V.Lamour. ex C.Agardh

= Caulerpa flexilis =

Species of alga

Caulerpa flexilis is a species of seaweed in the Caulerpaceae family.

The seaweed has a thick stolon with erect dark green primary fronds that are about 5 to 40 centimetres (2.0 to 15.7 in) long and 2 to 6 cm (0.79 to 2.36 in) wide.

The species is found around much of the Australian coast as well as in New Zealand. In Western Australia, it is found along the coast in a large area extending from around the Abrolhos Islands in the Mid West, south as far as Esperance in the Goldfields-Esperance region of Western Australia. In New Zealand it is found along the coast of Three Kings Island, the North Island and the northern parts of the South Island.
