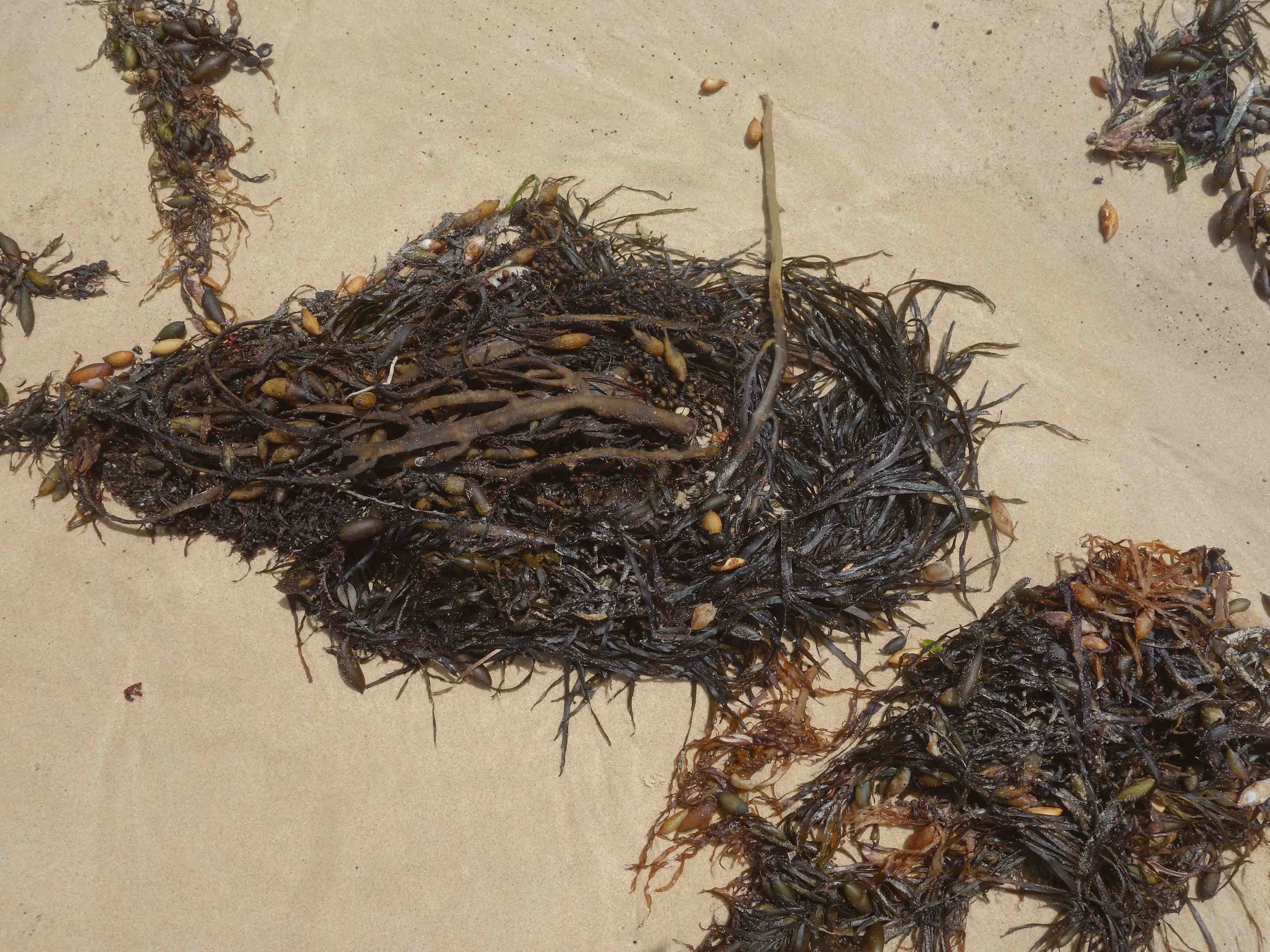
- Phyllospora comosa

Scientific classification
- Domain: Eukaryota
- Clade: Diaphoretickes
- Clade: SAR
- Clade: Stramenopiles
- Phylum: Gyrista
- Subphylum: Ochrophytina
- Class: Phaeophyceae
- Order: Fucales
- Family: Seirococcaceae; Nizamuddin 1962

= Seirococcaceae =

Family of seaweeds

The Seirococcaceae are a family of brown algae, containing five genera:

- Cystosphaera Skottsberg, 1907
- Marginariella Tandy, 1936
- Phyllospora C.Agardh, 1839
- Scytothalia Greville, 1830
- Seirococcus Greville, 1830
