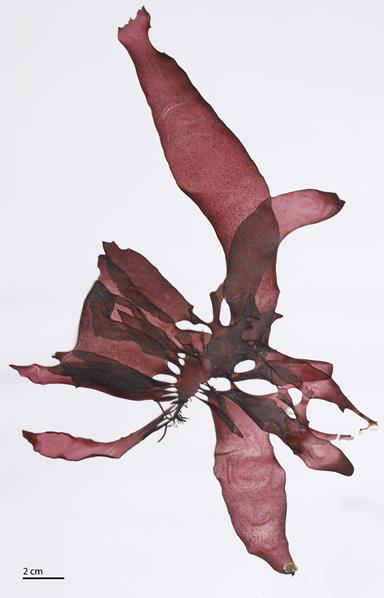
- Rhodoglossum gigartinoides pressing

Scientific classification
- Domain: Eukaryota
- Clade: Archaeplastida
- Division: Rhodophyta
- Class: Florideophyceae
- Order: Gigartinales
- Family: Gigartinaceae
- Genus: Rhodoglossum
- Species: R. gigartinoides

Binomial name
- Rhodoglossum gigartinoides (Sonder) Edyvane & Womersley 1993

= Rhodoglossum gigartinoides =

Species of red algae

Rhodoglossum gigartinoides is a species of red algae, of the Gigartinaceae family. This algae is found primarily in marine waters of Australia and New Zealand. It was reported in the subantarctic Kerguelen Islands in 2021.

== Taxonomy ==
R. gigantinoides was originally described in 1855 in the genus Grateloupia by Otto Wilhelm Sonder. It was reclassified into the genus Rhodoglossum in 1993. It also has 13 heterotypic synonyms in the genera Gigartina, Rhodoglossum, and Iridaea.
