= Chaetomorpha coliformis =

Scientific classification
- Clade: Viridiplantae
- Division: Chlorophyta
- Class: Ulvophyceae
- Order: Cladophorales
- Family: Cladophoraceae
- Genus: Chaetomorpha
- Species: C. coliformis

Binomial name
- Chaetomorpha coliformis (Montagne) Kützing, 1849

Species of algae

Chaetomorpha coliformis, or sea emerald, is a species of seaweed.

== Description ==
A small seaweed that grows in the intertidal zone, with glassy or clear round bladders that give the impression of strings of emeralds.

== Range ==
New Zealand.
