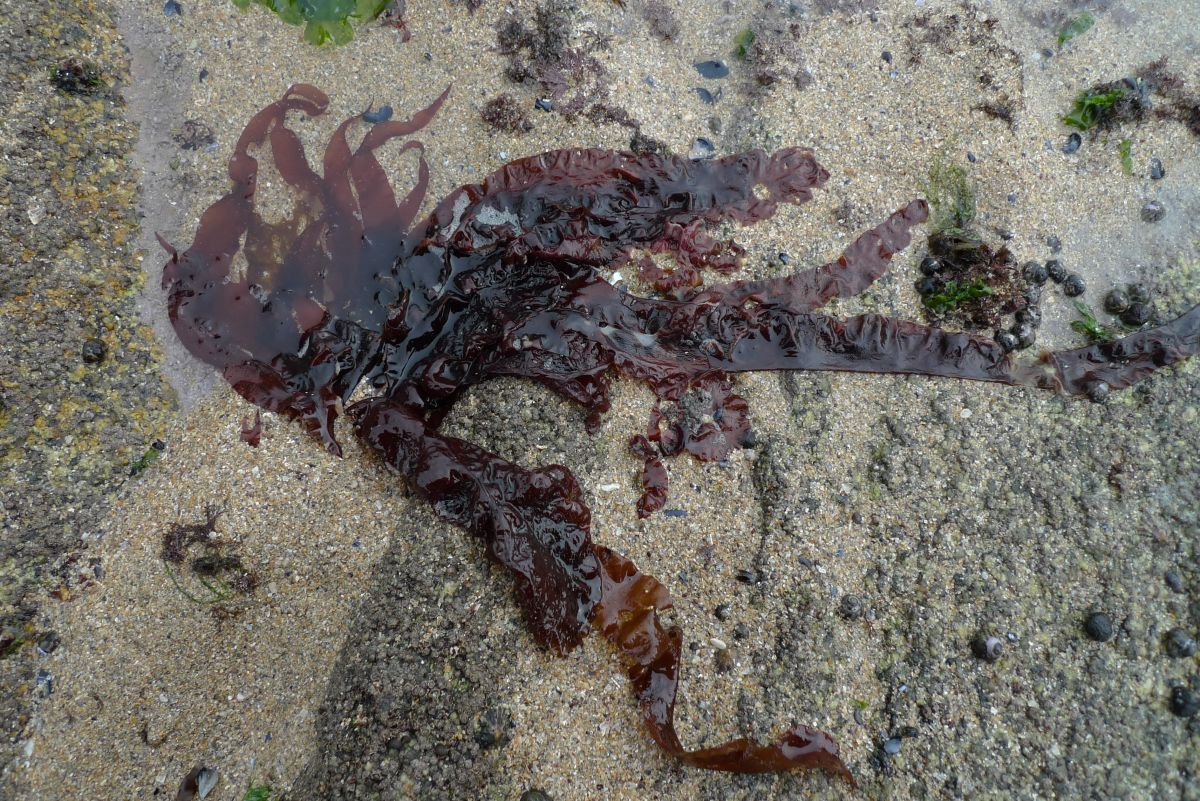

Scientific classification
- Clade: Archaeplastida
- Division: Rhodophyta
- Class: Florideophyceae
- Order: Halymeniales
- Family: Halymeniaceae
- Genus: Grateloupia
- Species: G. turuturu

Binomial name
- Grateloupia turuturu Yamada, 1941

= Grateloupia turuturu =

Species of algae

Grateloupia turuturu, commonly called the devil's tongue weed, is a marine species of Rhodophyta (red algae), a type of seaweed, native to East Asia (China, Japan, Korea) and parts of eastern Russia. Due to global shipping and maritime activities, G. turuturu has become an invasive species that has altered natural communities by out-competing native seaweed species; this has resulted in habitat loss in many parts of the world, primarily in Australia, Northern Ireland, Great Britain, and the northeastern United States. Other common names for this species are the "red menace" and "red tide".

== Description ==
Grateloupia turuturu is a large species of seaweed that has several shades of coloring such as red, maroon, and burgundy. However, it may also be yellow when dying or deceased. It is soft and gelatinous in texture. The blades of the organism vary in size and shape; typically 1 to 8 blades will stem from a center, attached by a cylindrical holdfast. Each blade can grow to be almost a meter long, 3-15 centimeters wide, and 10-70 cm long.

== Distribution ==
Currently, G. turuturu is found in Asia, Europe, North America, and Oceania. It is native to China, Japan, and South Korea. In Europe, it is found in France, Italy, the Netherlands, Portugal, Russia, Spain, the United Kingdom, and the Channel Islands. In North America, it is found in Mexico and in the United States, specifically in Connecticut, Massachusetts, New York, and Rhode Island. In Oceania, it is found in Australia and New Zealand.

== Habitat and ecology ==
Grateloupia turuturu is a perennial plant living an average of 6-10 years. They grow best in nutrient-rich eutrophic waters and are commonly found on rocky layers near coastal and shallow shores. This species can quickly grow in length and peak in biomass during the late summer and early autumn months; though growth begins to wane in late spring and early summer. It has adapted to live in variable temperatures and levels of salinity(12-52 ppt), being able to continue normal growth in temperatures as low as 3°C and as high as 29°C. This is advantageous to the plant as it can withstand many environmental changes, making it an increasingly threatening and invasive species. Several small invertebrates live in proximity to G. turuturu populations, including shrimps, snails, adolescent fish and crabs. There is little evidence of herbivory on G. turuturu.

=== Reproduction ===
Grateloupia turuturu reproduce sexually, and asexually via spores and through vegetative propagation. Peak reproduction time occurs in the summer, during which time an average of 90% of individuals are fertile. Germination of this species is similar to that of many other naturally occurring seaweed, where large dense masses of non-motile aplanospores are released into the environment; since discharging spores of red algae cannot swim they must rely on water currents to transport them. When spores settle they form small rounded discs that develop via a germ tube, these discs can produce various shoots that have the ability to release thousands of additional spores. Vegetative reproduction occurs when a fragment of the plant breaks off and develops directly into new individuals, all offspring resulting from this asexual reproduction are genetically identical to each other.

=== Dispersal ===
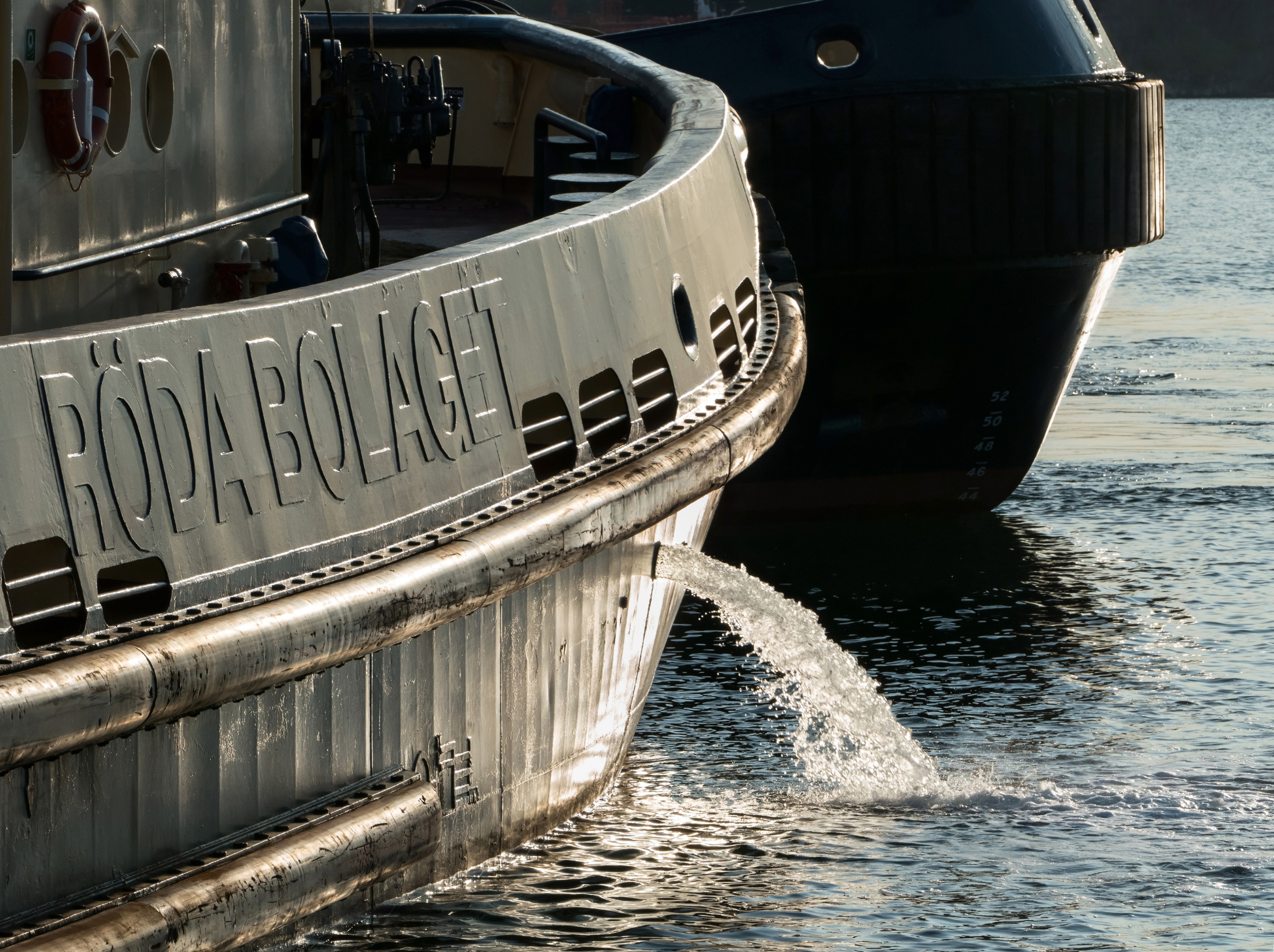
A tugboat pumping ballast water into the ocean.

One of the major means of transport for G. turuturu’s that enables its spread is molluscan aquaculture, or shellfish farming, this involves intentional transportation of shellfish that contains juvenile spores and/or fragments of the plant species. Transport of macroscopic spores via “stone-rafting” or drifting of fertile blades on small cobbles/rock may also occur, as well as accidental transfer on boats. Spores may also be transported in ballast water over long distances.

== Uses ==
Grateloupia turuturu is edible.

== As an invasive species ==
Originating from the northwest Pacific, Grateloupia turuturu has become dispersed profoundly being recorded in regions of Australia, New Zealand, Northeastern United States, Western Europe and the Mediterranean. Originally, many reports of G. turuturu in North America and Europe were thought to be a species from the Peruvian waters, G. doryphora. However, close examination regarding molecular and morphological comparisons concluded that the species that have been appearing in North American and Europe were indeed G. turuturu. One experiment, which was conducted in Northern Portugal, examined if G. turuturu was a passenger or driver of ecological change. The results of the experiment suggested that G. turuturu waited for disturbances in the environment that reduced the abundance of competitors, before increasing in population for a particular habitat. This could lead to the possibility that disturbances, due to human contribution, could result in the increased spreading of this invasive species.

The invasive properties of G. turuturu have significant impacts on its environment and the species that inhabit those areas. This impact can be seen by observing native biota such as the five major plant species in the North Atlantic (Chondrus crispus, Mastocarpus stellatus, Palmaria palmata, Saccharina latissima, and S. longicruris) which all occur within low shallow subtidal zones—the same environment in which G. turuturu thrives. Due in part to its size, it is able to block the amount of sunlight its understory vegetation receives, this is why enhanced growth of Grateloupia could cause a shift or reduced diversity of neighboring organisms such as, other native seaweeds, marine life, and bacteria.

=== Control ===
There are not many records about controlling the spread of this species successfully. However, in 2017, to control an invasion of G. turuturu on the coast of Maine, researchers tested how the seaweed reacted to methods commonly used in invasive species and pathogen control. Such methods include heat treatment and addition of bleach to sea water (chlorination) at levels that could not harm the environment. Blades of G. turuturu were observed for weeks in petri dishes that either contained bleach + salt water solutions or heated salt water (60-75 °C). The results indicated that G.turuturu had resistances to bleach due to sugars on the cell wall that are reactive to bleach. Heat treatment was successful and rapidly killed the seaweed. Based on this experiment, extended drying periods and heat treatment could serve as environmentally friendly countermeasures to G. turuturu invasion.
