= C12H10O6 =

The molecular formula C_{12}H_{10}O_{6} (molar mass: 250.20 g/mol, exact mass: 250.0477 u) may refer to:

- Difucol, a phlorotannin
- Diphlorethol, a phlorotannin
