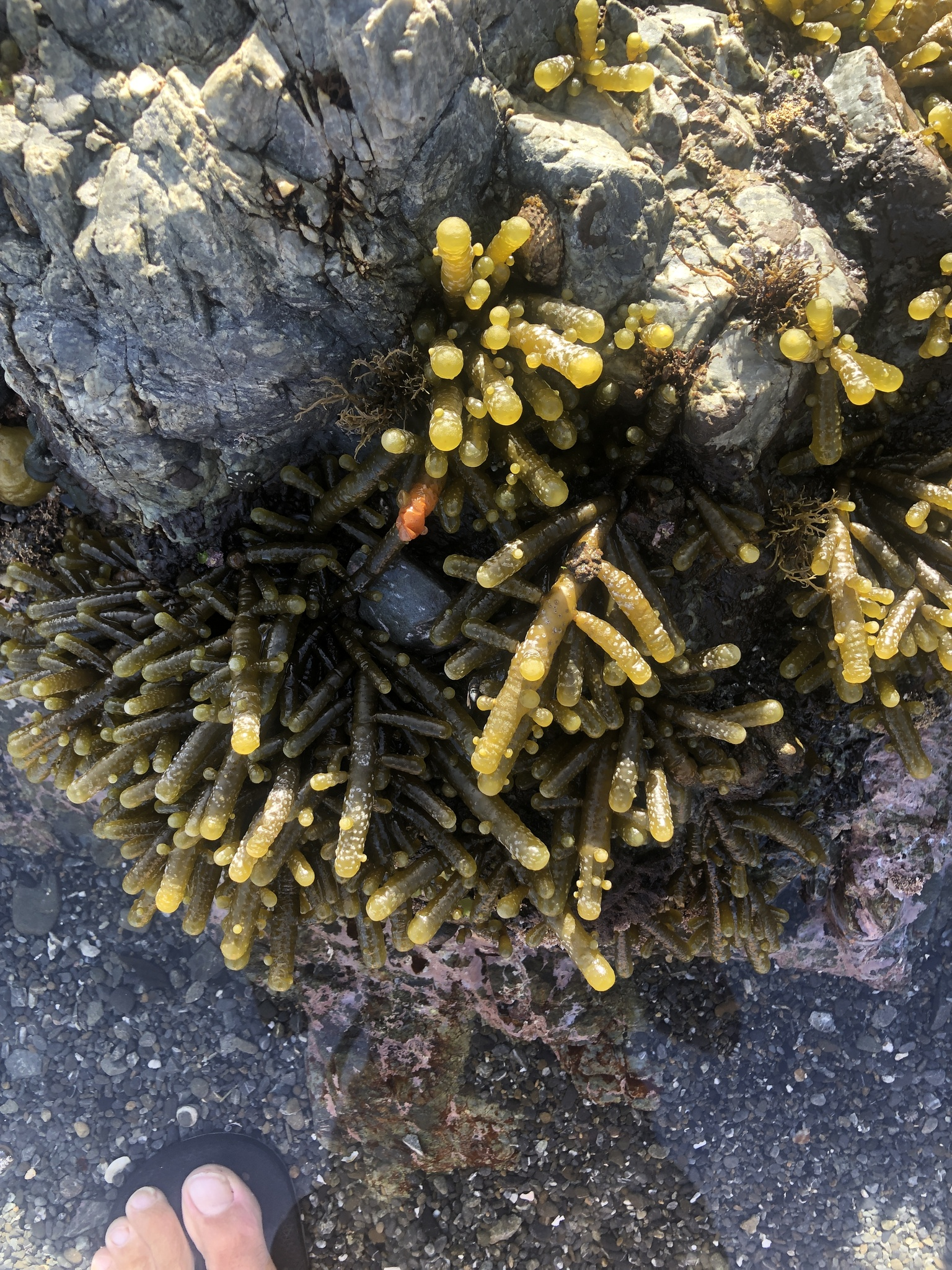
- Splachnidium rugosum at Te Kopahou Reserve

Scientific classification
- Domain: Eukaryota
- Clade: Sar
- Clade: Stramenopiles
- Division: Ochrophyta
- Class: Phaeophyceae
- Order: Scytothamnales
- Family: Splachnidiaceae
- Genus: Splachnidium
- Species: S. rugosum

Binomial name
- Splachnidium rugosum (L.) Grev.

= Splachnidium rugosum =

Species of seaweed

Splachnidium rugosum, the deadman's fingers or gummy weed, is a species of seaweed in New Zealand.

== Description ==
A small seaweed that grows on rocks near the shore and in the intertidal zone, tubular, which is filled with a clear gooey substance.

== Range ==
Native to New Zealand, and known across the southern hemisphere, from Tristan da Cunha to South Africa to Australia.

Community scientists using the platform INaturalist have identified superficially morphologically similar specimens across the southern Hemisphere using user-uploaded photos.

== Habitat ==
Intertidal zone.

== Taxonomy ==
Splachnidium is monotypic, containing only the species S. rugosum.
