= H. japonicus =

H. japonicus may refer to:

- Humulus japonicus, the Japanese hop, an ornamental plant species
- Hypomesus japonicus, the Japanese smelt, a coastal fish species of the northwestern Pacific Ocean

== See also ==
- H. japonica
- H. japonicum
