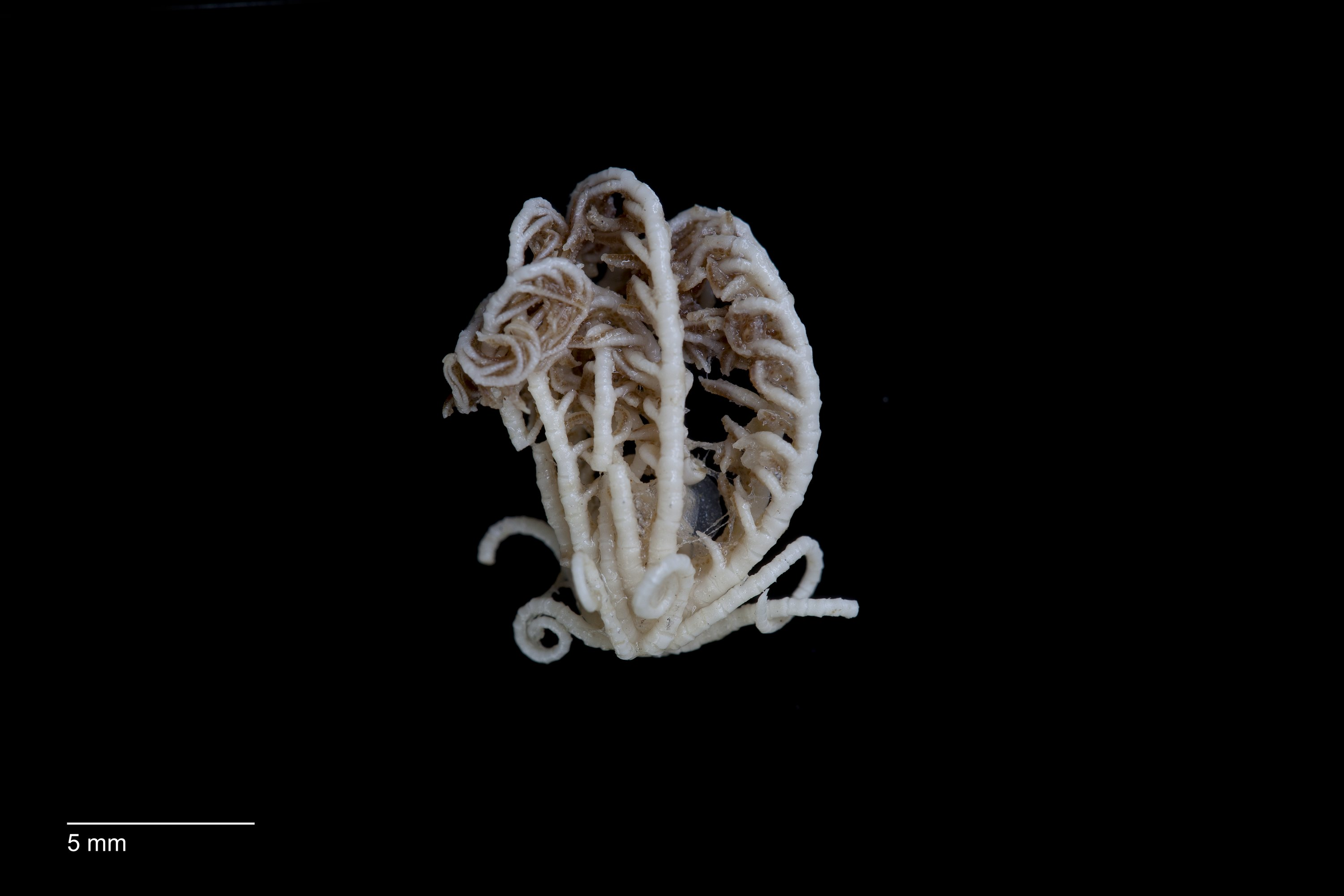
- Aporometra paedophora
- Aporometra paedophora Figs 4-10, Plate XLVII (HL Clark, 1909)

Scientific classification
- Kingdom: Animalia
- Phylum: Echinodermata
- Class: Crinoidea
- Superorder: Articulata
- Order: Comatulida
- Family: Aporometridae
- Genus: Aporometra
- Species: A. paedophora

Binomial name
- Aporometra paedophora (H.L. Clark, 1909)

Synonyms
- Himerometra paedophora HL Clark, 1909

= Aporometra paedophora =

Species of crinoid

Aporometra paedophora is a marine invertebrate, a species of crinoid or feather star in the family Aporometridae. It was first found at a depth of 22 fathoms (40 m) off the Manning River on the New South Wales coast. Other specimens were found off the coast of Bunbury, Western Australia at depths between 9 and 15 m (but these have since been identified as Aporometra wilsoni). Based on morphological evidence of four (somewhat degraded) specimens of A. paedophora (all paratypes), Helgen & Rouse believe that this may not be a separate species from Aporometra wilsoni.

== Description ==
Plate XLVII shows three types of pinnules: first, second and distal pinnules (Figs 4–6), and pentacrinoid larvae (Figs 7–9) from youngest to oldest. Fig 10 shows a cirrus. In the earliest free-swimming stage, the arms are about 7 mm long and have about nine pinnules on each side. This is a small species of crinoid with arms up to 3 cm (1.2 in) long. All Clark's large specimens carried pentacrinoid larvae attached to their pinnules.

== Distribution ==
This crinoid is endemic to temperate Australian waters, and apparently found only off the Manning River, in New South Wales.

== Ecology ==
The first specimens of Aporometra paedophora to be described were found clinging by their cirri to the pinnules and cirri of the crinoid, Ptilometra macronema.

Crinoids are dioecious, with separate male and female individuals. They do not have true gonads, instead they produce gametes from genital canals found inside some of the pinnules. In most species, the sperm and eggs are released into the water column when the pinnules rupture. However, as with Aporometra wilsoni, older specimens of A. paedophora carry their larvae in their pinnules.
