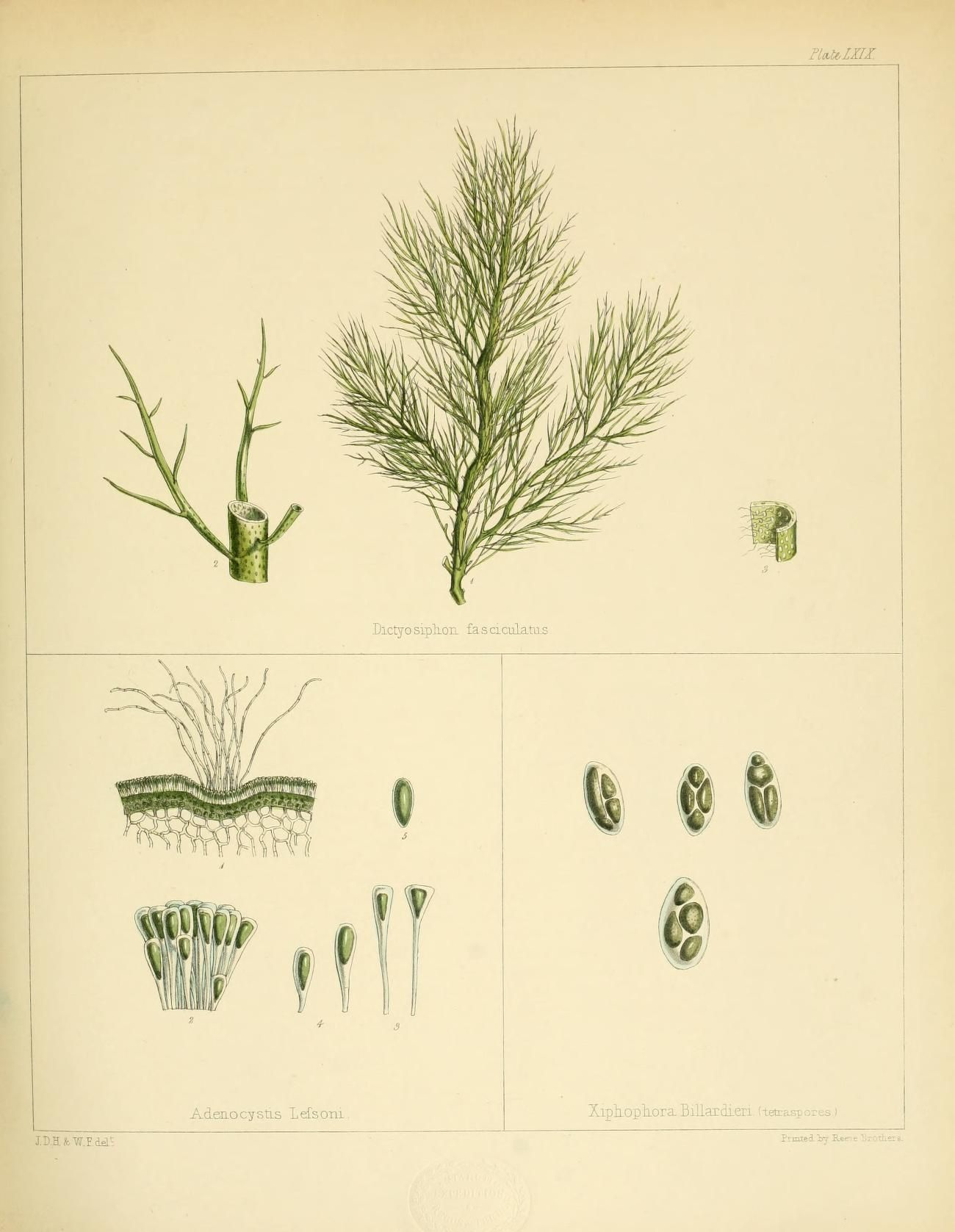
- Fig I: Dictyosiphon fasciculatus = Scytothamnus fasciculatus

Scientific classification
- Domain: Eukaryota
- Clade: Diaphoretickes
- Clade: SAR
- Clade: Stramenopiles
- Phylum: Gyrista
- Subphylum: Ochrophytina
- Class: Phaeophyceae
- Order: Scytothamnales
- Family: Splachnidiaceae
- Genus: Scytothamnus; J.D.Hooker & Harvey, 1845

Species
- See text

= Scytothamnus =

Genus of algae

Scytothamnus is a brown algae genus in the family Splachnidiaceae.

== Species ==
- Scytothamnus australis (J.Agardh) J.D.Hooker & Harvey - type
- Scytothamnus fasciculatus (J.D.Hooker & Harvey) A.D.Cotton
- Scytothamnus hirsutus Skottsberg
- Scytothamnus rugulosus (Bory de Saint-Vincent) De Toni

== See also ==
- List of brown algal genera
