= S. australis =

S. australis may refer to:

- Sauromalus australis, the Peninsular chuckwalla, a lizard species found in Mexico
- Schenkia australis, an annual herb species endemic to Australia
- Scolypopa australis, the passionvine hopper, an insect species found in Australia
- Scytothamnus australis, a brown alga species found in New Zealand
- Sloanea australis, the maiden's blush, a rainforest tree species found in Australia
- Smilax australis, the lawyer vine, barbwire vine or "wait-a-while", a plant species endemic to Australia
- Soroavisaurus australis, an enantiornithine bird species that lived during the Late Cretaceous of Argentina
- Suaeda australis, the austral seablite, a plant species native to Australia
- Syconycteris australis, the Common Blossom Bat, Southern Blossom Bat or Queensland Blossom Bat, a fruit bat species

== See also ==
- Australis (disambiguation)
