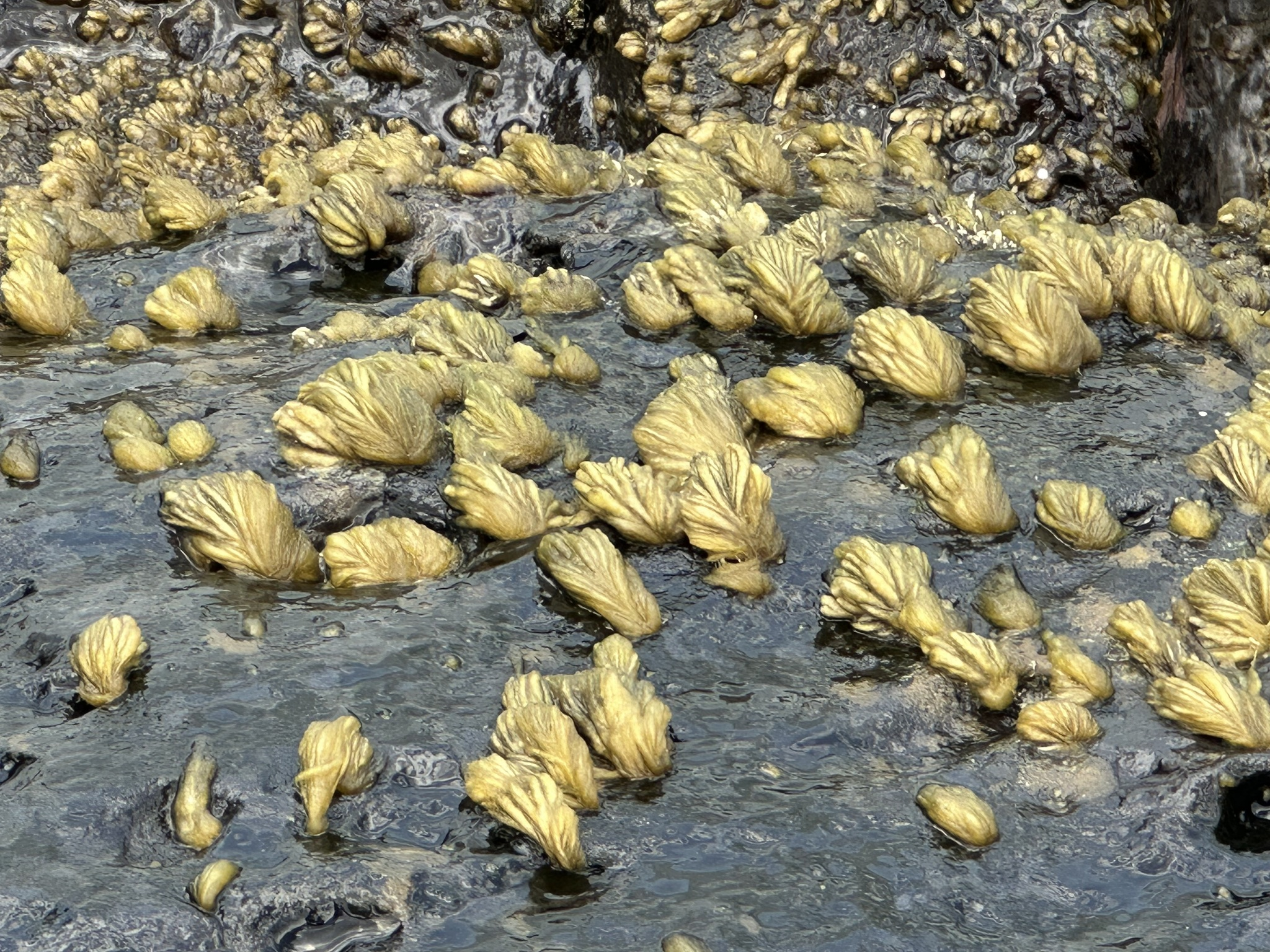

Scientific classification
- Domain: Eukaryota
- Clade: Diaphoretickes
- Clade: SAR
- Clade: Stramenopiles
- Phylum: Gyrista
- Subphylum: Ochrophytina
- Class: Phaeophyceae
- Order: Scytothamnales
- Family: Asteronemataceae
- Genus: Asteronema
- Species: A. breviarticulatum

Binomial name
- Asteronema breviarticulatum (J.Agardh) Ouriques & Bouzon, 2000

Synonyms
- Ectocarpus breviarticulatus J.Agardh, 1847 · unaccepted; Ectocarpus hamatus P.L.Crouan & H.M.Crouan, 1865 · unaccepted; Ectocarpus spongiosus Dickie, 1874 · unaccepted; Ectocarpus spongodioides P.Crouan & H.Crouan, 1878 · unaccepted; Feldmannia breviarticulata (J.Agardh) Pham-Hoàng Hô, 1969 · unaccepted; Giffordia breviarticulata (J.Agardh) Doty & I.A.Abbott · unaccepted (synonym); Hincksia breviarticulata (J.Agardh) P.C.Silva, 1987 · unaccepted (synonym)

= Asteronema breviarticulatum =

Species of brown algae

Asteronema breviarticulatum is a species of brown algae in the family Asteronemataceae.
