= Cystophora =

Cystophora may refer to:

- Cystophora (alga): a brown algae genus in the family Sargassaceae
- Cystophora (mammal): the hooded seal
