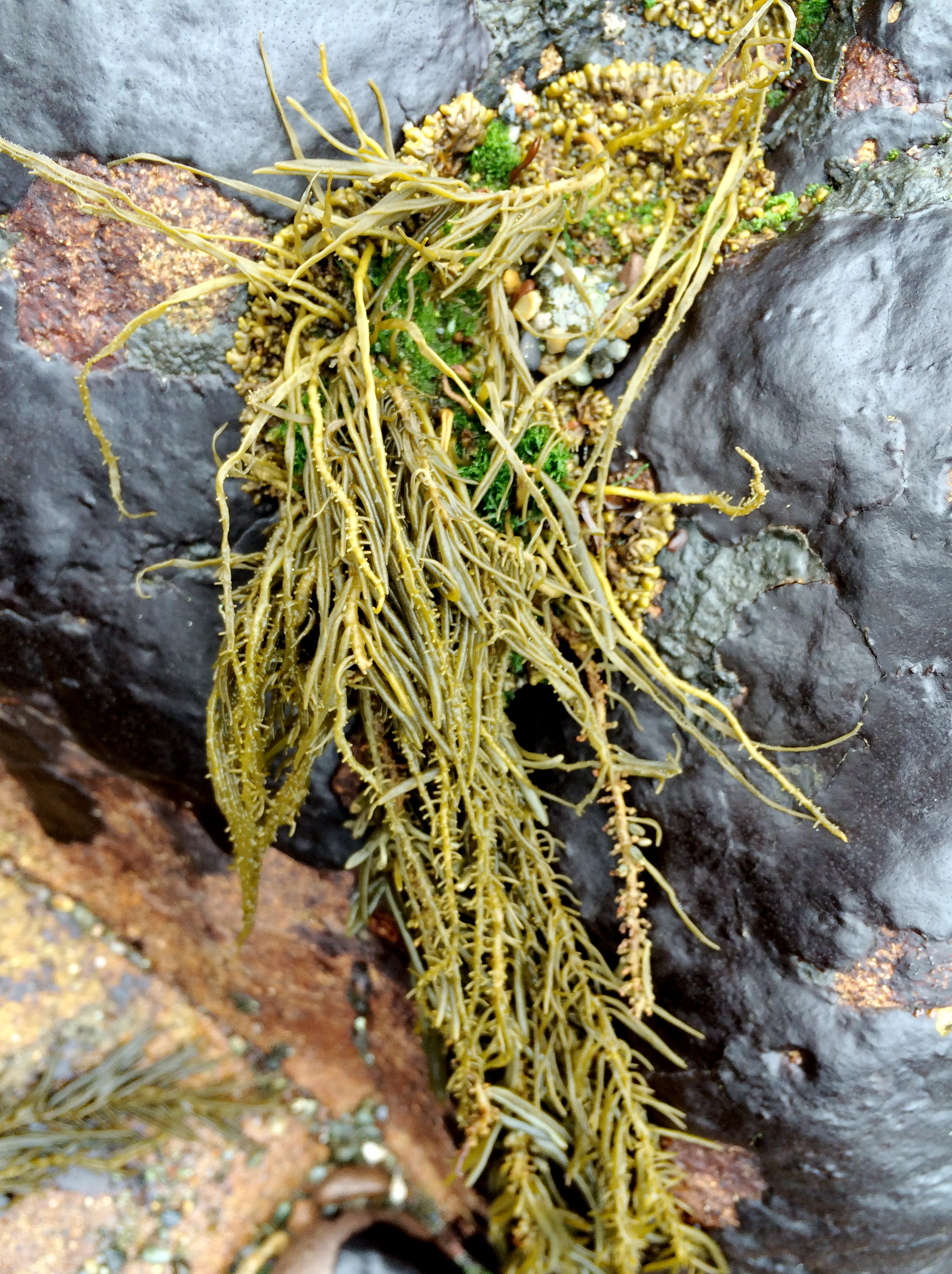
- Analipus japonicus (sea fir) North Moonstone beach, Cambria, California. Note the dark basal crust, or "tar spot", the overwintering phase.

Scientific classification
- Domain: Eukaryota
- Clade: Diaphoretickes
- Clade: SAR
- Clade: Stramenopiles
- Phylum: Gyrista
- Subphylum: Ochrophytina
- Class: Phaeophyceae
- Order: Ralfsiales
- Family: Ralfsiaceae
- Genus: Analipus; Kjellman 1889

Species
- Analipus filiformis (Ruprecht) Papenfuss; Analipus gunjii (Yendo) Kogame & Yoshida; Analipus japonicus (Harvey) M.J.Wynne

= Analipus =

Genus of single-celled organisms

Analipus is a brown algae genus in the family Ralfsiaceae.

== See also ==
- List of brown algal genera
