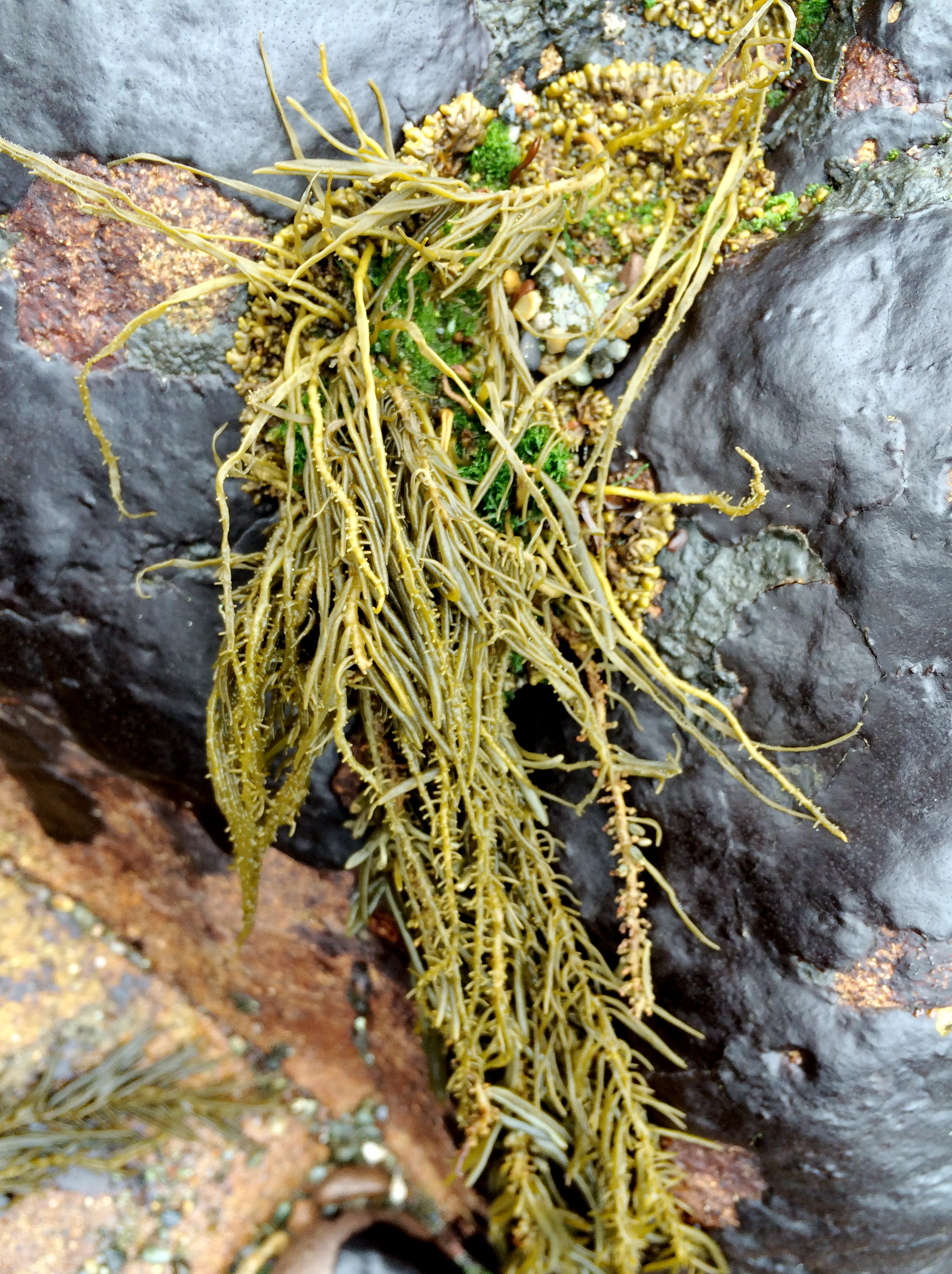
- Analipus japonicus, Cambria, California

Scientific classification
- Domain: Eukaryota
- Clade: Diaphoretickes
- Clade: SAR
- Clade: Stramenopiles
- Phylum: Gyrista
- Subphylum: Ochrophytina
- Class: Phaeophyceae
- Order: Ralfsiales
- Family: Ralfsiaceae
- Genus: Analipus
- Species: A. japonicus

Binomial name
- Analipus japonicus (Harvey) M.J.Wynne, 1971

Synonyms
- Halosaccion japonicum Harvey; Chordaria abietina Ruprecht ex Farlow; Heterochordaria abietina (Ruprecht ex Farlow) Setchell et Gardner

= Analipus japonicus =

Species of alga

Analipus japonicus, or sea fir, is a brown alga species in the genus Analipus.

This species contains the phlorotannins difucol, trifucol, tetrafucol A and B, two pentafucols, four hexafucols, a heptafucol mixture and halogenated compounds such as bromo- and chlorotrifucol, 5'-bromo- and 5'-chlorotetrafucol-A as well as 5'-bromo- and 5'-chloropentafucol-A.

This brown alga species is a Pacific subtropical-boreal plant species that populates the stone coast from the Sea of Japan to the Bering Sea and from Alaska to California. The Analipus thallus is an abiding lobed basal crust ("tar spot"), from which a short lived vertical axis with a number of branches develop. From the branches develop a unilocular or multilocular sporangia advance on the branches.
