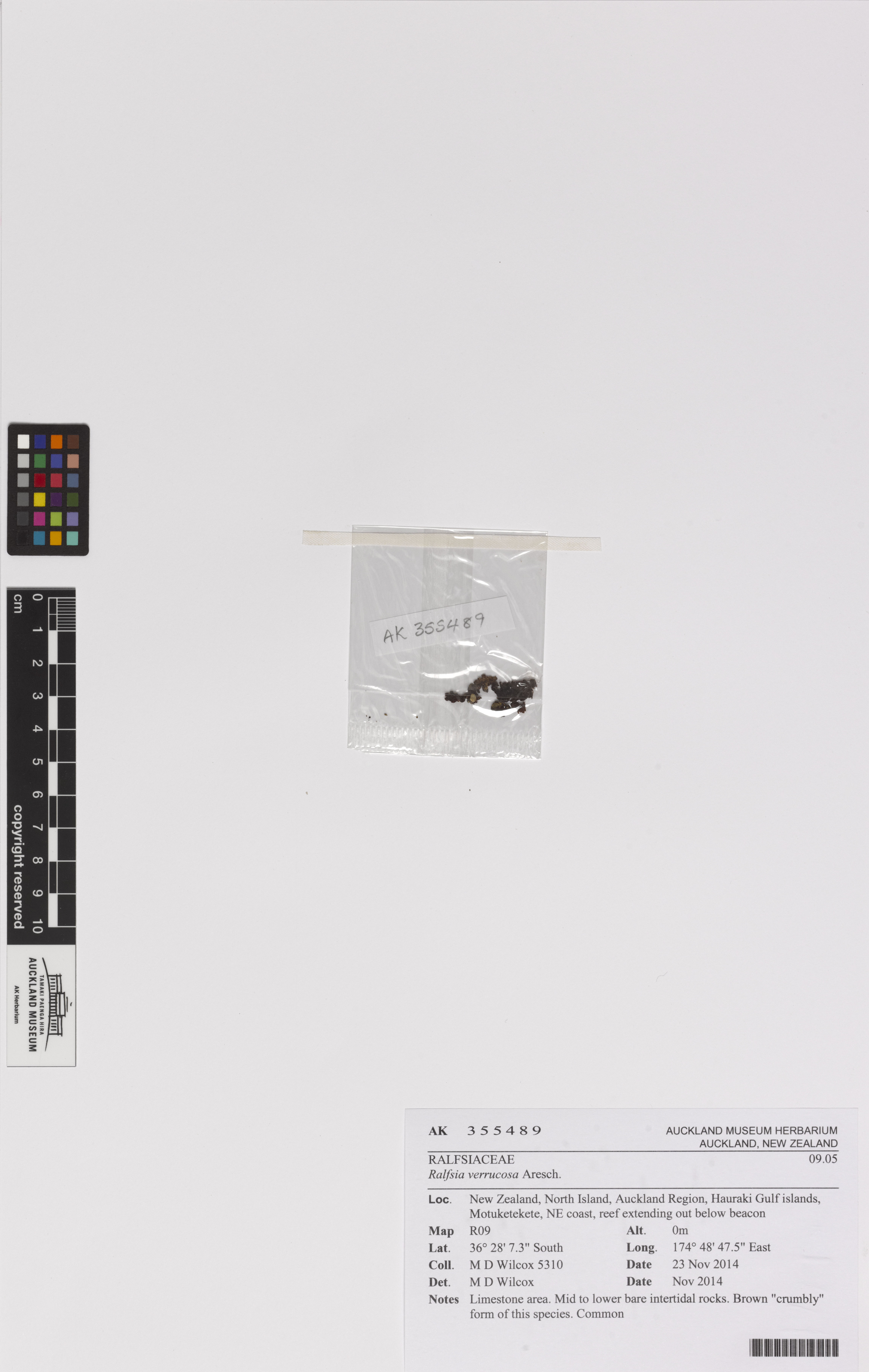
- Ralfsia verrucosa Aresch.

Scientific classification
- Domain: Eukaryota
- Clade: Sar
- Clade: Stramenopiles
- Division: Ochrophyta
- Class: Phaeophyceae
- Order: Ralfsiales
- Family: Ralfsiaceae
- Genus: Ralfsia
- Species: R. verrucosa

Binomial name
- Ralfsia verrucosa Areschoug, 1845

Synonyms
- Cruoria verrucosa Areschoug, 1843; Ralfsia verrucosa var. cochlearum Areschoug, 1876; Ralfsia verrucosa var. lignicola Areschoug, 1847

= Ralfsia verrucosa =

Species of seaweed

Ralfsia verrucosa is a species of crustose brown seaweed in the family Ralfsiaceae. It grows intertidally in temperate waters around the world. In South Africa it is part of a mutualistic relationship with a limpet.

== Description ==
Ralfsia verrucosa forms roughly circular patches that grow outwards from the centre with the central parts sometimes becoming detached from the substrate. The thallus is deep brown or blackish-brown and is about 1 mm (0.04 in) thick. It has a distinct, often pale-coloured, margin which is formed from erect filaments which are fused together and that curve upwards from other prostrate filaments. The patches of thalli are thick, some 2 to 10 cm (1 to 4 in) in diameter and often coalescing to form larger patches. The surface is smooth and hard.

== Distribution and habitat ==
Ralfsia verrucosa is a cosmopolitan species and is found in temperate waters in northern and western Europe, Mediterranean Sea, Iceland, Greenland, Canada, New England, Argentina, round the coasts of Africa, India, Japan, Korea, China, Russia, Indonesia, Australia and New Zealand. It grows on rock in pools in the intertidal zone.

== Biology ==
The brown colour of this seaweed results from the dominance of the xanthophyll fucoxanthin which masks the other pigments that are present, namely chlorophyll a, chlorophyll c, beta-carotene and other xanthophylls. The tissues contain polyphenols which act as a deterrent to herbivores.

Round the coasts of South Africa, Ralfsia verrucosa enjoys a mutual relationship with the limpet Scutellastra longicosta. This limpet clears an area of rock by intensive grazing, and allows Ralfsia verrucosa to settle on it while excluding other species of algae. The limpet then cultivates its "garden", grazing the algal turf to a moderate level and fertilising it with faeces and mucus. A 7 centimetres (2.8 in) limpet can "farm" an area of about 150 square centimetres (23 sq in) of algal turf and defend its territory from intrusion by other limpets.

The genus name commemorates the botanist John Ralfs.
