= Trifucol =

Names
- Preferred IUPAC name [1^{1},2^{1}:2^{3},3^{1}-Terphenyl]-1^{2},1^{4},1^{6},2^{2},2^{4},2^{6},3^{2},3^{4},3^{6}-nonol

Identifiers
CAS Number	62218-04-6
3D model (JSmol)	Interactive image
ChemSpider	35802528
PubChem CID	71401226
UNII	U7NO04BE05
CompTox Dashboard (EPA)	DTXSID30822434
- InChI: InChI=1S/C18H14O9/c19-6-1-8(21)14(9(22)2-6)16-12(25)5-13(26)17(18(16)27)15-10(23)3-7(20)4-11(15)24/h1-5,19-27H Key: COTZPIUJHGYKAQ-UHFFFAOYSA-N
- SMILES: C1=C(C(=C(C(=C1O)C2=C(C=C(C=C2O)O)O)O)C3=C(C=C(C=C3O)O)O)O

Properties
Chemical formula	C_{18}H_{14}O_{9}
Molar mass	374.29 g/mol
- Except where otherwise noted, data are given for materials in their standard state (at 25 °C [77 °F], 100 kPa). Infobox references

Trifucol is a phlorotannin found in the brown algae Scytothamnus australis and Analipus japonicus.
