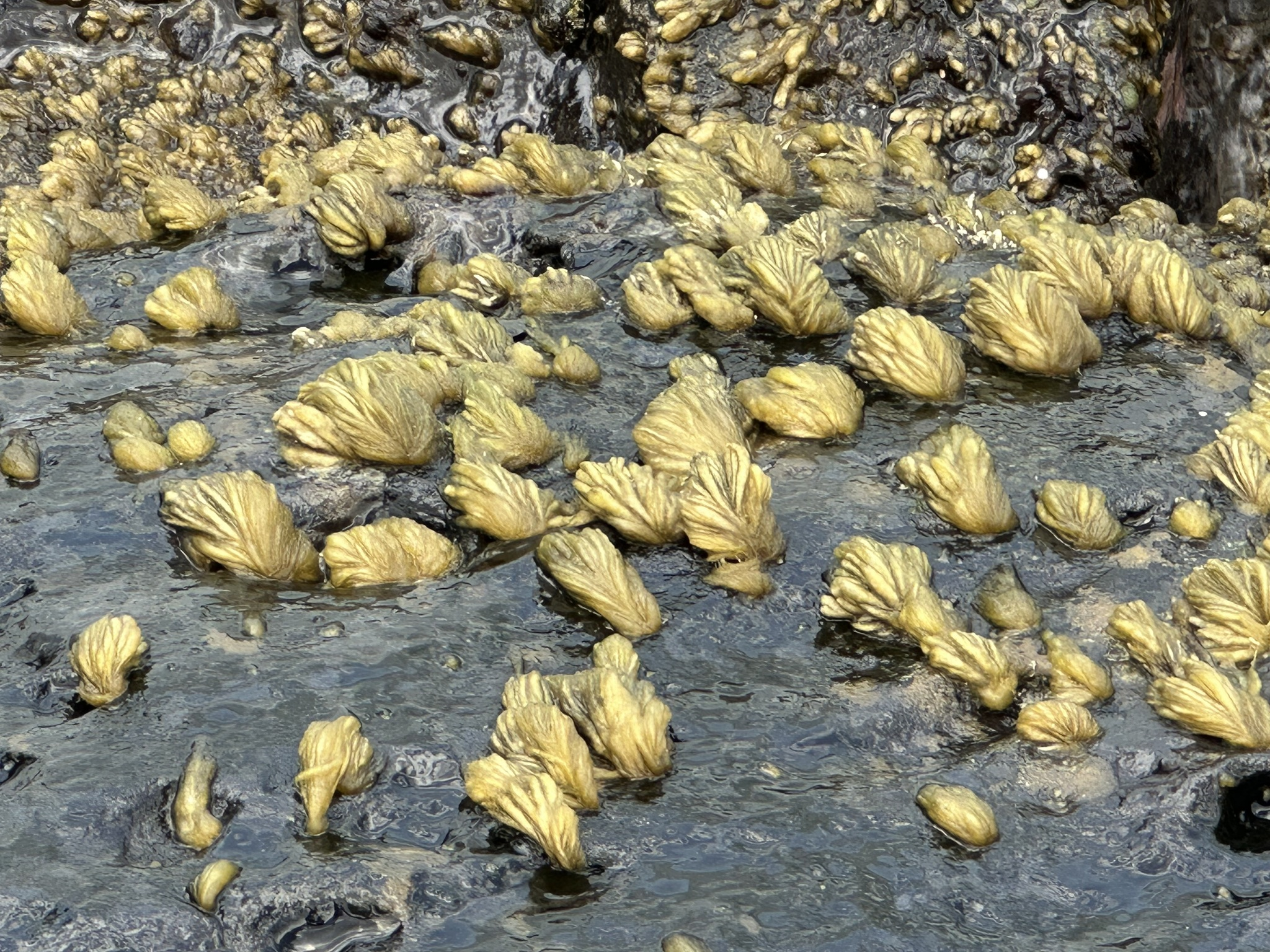
- Asteronema breviarticulatum

Scientific classification
- Domain: Eukaryota
- Clade: Diaphoretickes
- Clade: SAR
- Clade: Stramenopiles
- Phylum: Gyrista
- Subphylum: Ochrophytina
- Class: Phaeophyceae
- Order: Scytothamnales
- Family: Asteronemataceae; T.Silberfeld, M.-F.Racault, R.L.Fletcher, F.Rousseau & B. de Reviers
- Genus: Asteronema; Delépine & Asensi, 1975

= Asteronema =

Genus of brown algae

Asteronema is a genus of brown algae in the order Scytothamnales, the only one in the family Asteronemataceae.

== List of species ==
There are currently four accepted species of Asteronema:

- Asteronema australe Delépine & Asensi, 1975
- Asteronema breviarticulatum (J.Agardh) Ouriques & Bouzon, 2000
- Asteronema ferrugineum (Harvey) Delépine & Asensi, 1975
- Asteronema microscopicum (Kützing) Trevisan
