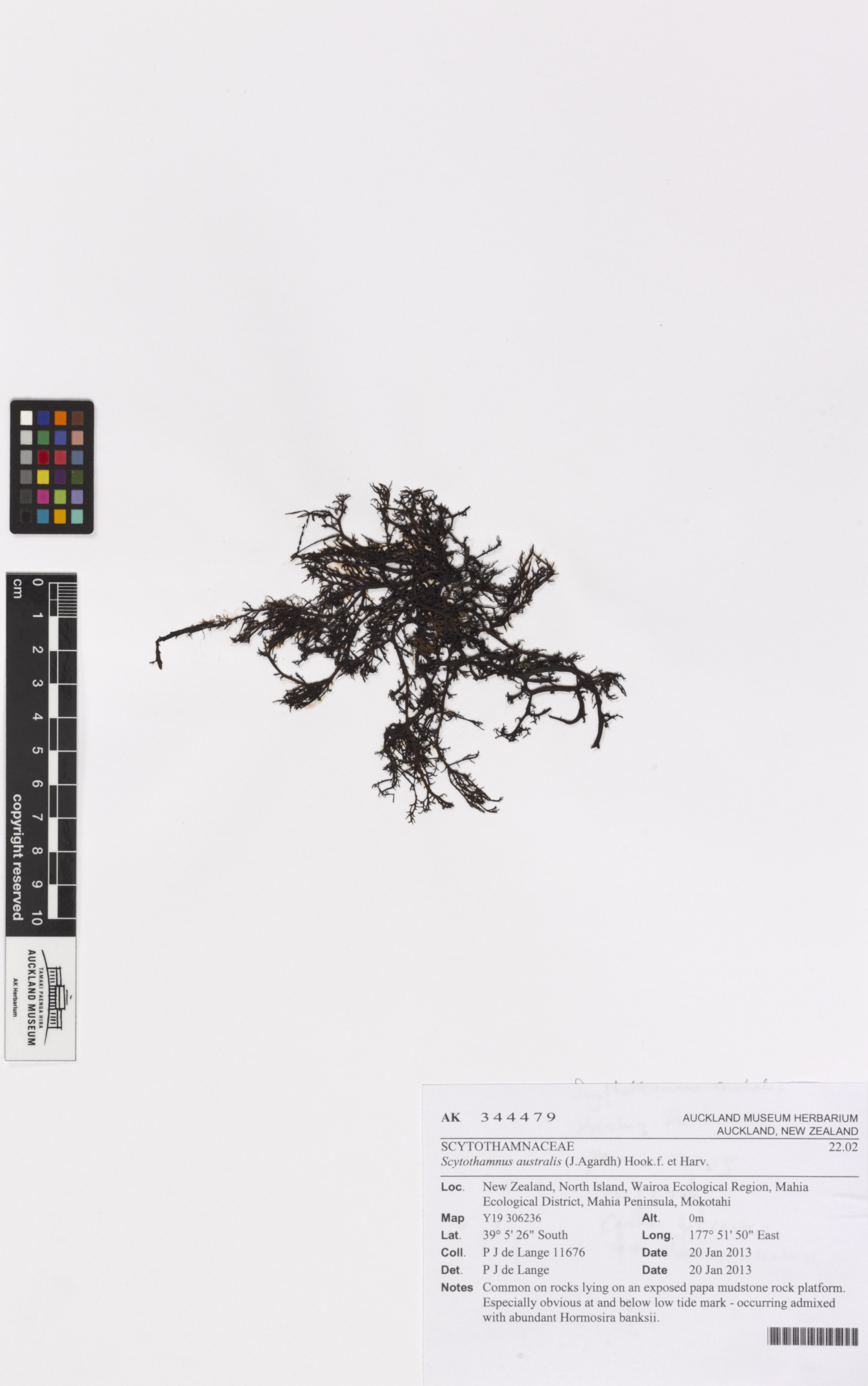

Scientific classification
- Domain: Eukaryota
- Supergroup: Stramenopiles
- Division: Ochrophyta
- Class: Phaeophyceae
- Order: Scytothamnales
- Family: Splachnidiaceae
- Genus: Scytothamnus
- Species: S. australis

Binomial name
- Scytothamnus australis (J.Agardh) J.D.Hooker & Harvey, 1845

= Scytothamnus australis =

Species of alga

Scytothamnus australis is a brown alga species in the genus Scytothamnus found in New Zealand. It is a sulphated polysaccharide and the type species in the genus.

The species contains the phlorotannins trifucol, tetrafucol A, tetrafucol B, cis-pentafucol A, diphlorethol A and triphlorethol A.

== Distribution ==
Scytothamnus australis has a southern circumpolar distribution and has been recorded to have been present from the waters of southern Australia, New Zealand and Chile.

== Description ==
Scytothamnus australis is a larger, more robust species than Scytothamnus fasciculatus, but possesses a similar branching pattern and broadly comparable vegetative anatomy.

=== Cell structure ===
As with the other species of Scytothamnus, Scytothamnus australis has a stellate (star-shaped) chloroplast with a central pyrenoid and is perforated by channels of cytoplasm.

=== Reproductive structure ===
Scytothamnus australis has a unilocular sporangia reproductive structure which means that it can produce meiospores or asexual spores. The gametophytes are dioecious (Dioecy) but no structural difference can be detected between the gametangia of male and female isolates. In "Scytothamnus australis" the gametes vary considerably in size, ranging from 3-6 ~tm in diameter.

== Life cycle ==
=== Sporogenesis ===
Unilocular sporangia develop scattered over most of the thallus except in the areas immediately below growing tips. When sporogenesis occurs close to the tips of branches the apical cells are generally no longer active. Sporangial initials are from the cells forming the thallus surface. They can be distinguished at an early stage by their size and by the presence of numerous electron transparent vesicles. The adjacent vegetative cells (any of the cells of a plant or animal except the reproductive cells) are smaller in size and are filled almost completely with densely packed physodes (any of various vesicular intracellular inclusions of brown algae that are of uncertain constitution and function). As the sporangium develops and enlarges further the nucleus and chloroplasts divide a number of times. The sporangium is egg-shaped and lies within the cortical (cells in the cortex) and medullary (or pith) cells. It is slightly narrower where it touches the surface. In the beginning the nuclei are in a central position, each being closely linked with a chloroplast. In the course of the first few divisions the chloroplast loses its characteristic star-shaped shape and the pyrenoid becomes smaller and occupies a side position. Subsequently, the nuclei are concentrated near the outer areas of the cytoplasm, and flagella appear to divide into separate types within vesicles before the division of individual meiospores (spores produced by meiosis). The chloroplasts meanwhile have largely regained a star-shaped form with a central pyrenoid. Mature sporangia appear as dark-brown spots on the thallus. The entire contents of a sporangium are discharged together with a mass of sticky material. As it slowly disperses the meiospores swim free. The side biflagellate (has two flagellate) meiospores contain one chloroplast with an eyespot (eyespot apparatus) and are capable of motion for a relatively short period of no more than 15 min. Upon settling they become spherical, measuring 6.5-11 gm in diameter. Each meiospore contains one to four relatively large lipid bodies in addition to the more numerous, smaller physodes.

=== Gametogenesis ===
Meiospore germination is usually bipolar or tripolar and they develop into densely branched thread-like microthalli. The filaments are 10-15gm in diameter in both species. Growth is the result of both terminal and intercalary(located between its daughter cells) cell divisions, and in older microthalli longitudinal intercalary divisions are common. The cells contain a star-shaped chloroplast having a typical pyrenoid. The way microthalli will develops depend on the conditions in which they are cultured. Prior to gametogenesis the vegetative cells of the gametophyte contained a number of large vesicles. Several changes occur following the onset of gametogenesis. In the cytoplasm, smooth endoplasmic reticulum (ER) became noticeable and the number of membrane-bound electron-dense (possibly lipid) bodies increased. At a later stage these bodies accumulated in the vesicles. There is a single Golgi body in the cell which appears to be closely linked with the vesicles. The transition to the next stage is marked by the shrinking of the cytoplasm away from the cell wall. Following this, flagella appear within cytoplasmic vesicles and the paired centrioles of the vegetative cells take on the function of basal bodies (organelles that form the base of a flagellum or cilium). The flagella gains mastigonemes and takes up an external position. At the same time the volume of extracellular material increases. The Golgi body at this stage occupies a position next to the developing flagella and the vesicles with the Golgi body contain a noticeable core of electron-dense material. An eyespot develops in the chloroplast which had retained its star-shape throughout gametogenesis. The internal walls of the gametangium then dissolve and the contents are expelled into the sea-water.

=== Fertilization ===
Gametes are released together with various fragments of cytoplasm. The gametes of both sex are anatomically indistinguishable and remain able to move for periods of up to approximately 30 minutes. Fusion was never observed in clonal cultures. However, female gametophytes were identified in some fertile cultures after a volatile (volatile organic compound), scented compound was detected during a parallel investigation of pheromone production. Fertilization was a not very noticeable process by which motile (able to move) gamete (male) approached an unmoving one (female) and, following contact, the two cells fused rapidly. Many zygotes having two eyespots and two chloroplasts can be identified in this process. The development of zygotes and unfused gametes follow the same pattern leading directly to the formation of parenchymatous sporophytes. Germination results in a branched filament having a terminal (not produced within the organism) hair. Cells of the filament, frequently those lying next to a hair are transformed into peaks and developed into erect, parenchymatous sporophytes. Numerous hairs and erect fronds were often formed on the same individual. A variable, but usually small, proportion of unfused gametes give rise to another generation of gametophytes. After gametophytes had been maintained in culture for prolonged periods, exceeding 2 years, they failed to respond to the short-day stimulus, appearing to have lost the capacity to produce gametangia.
