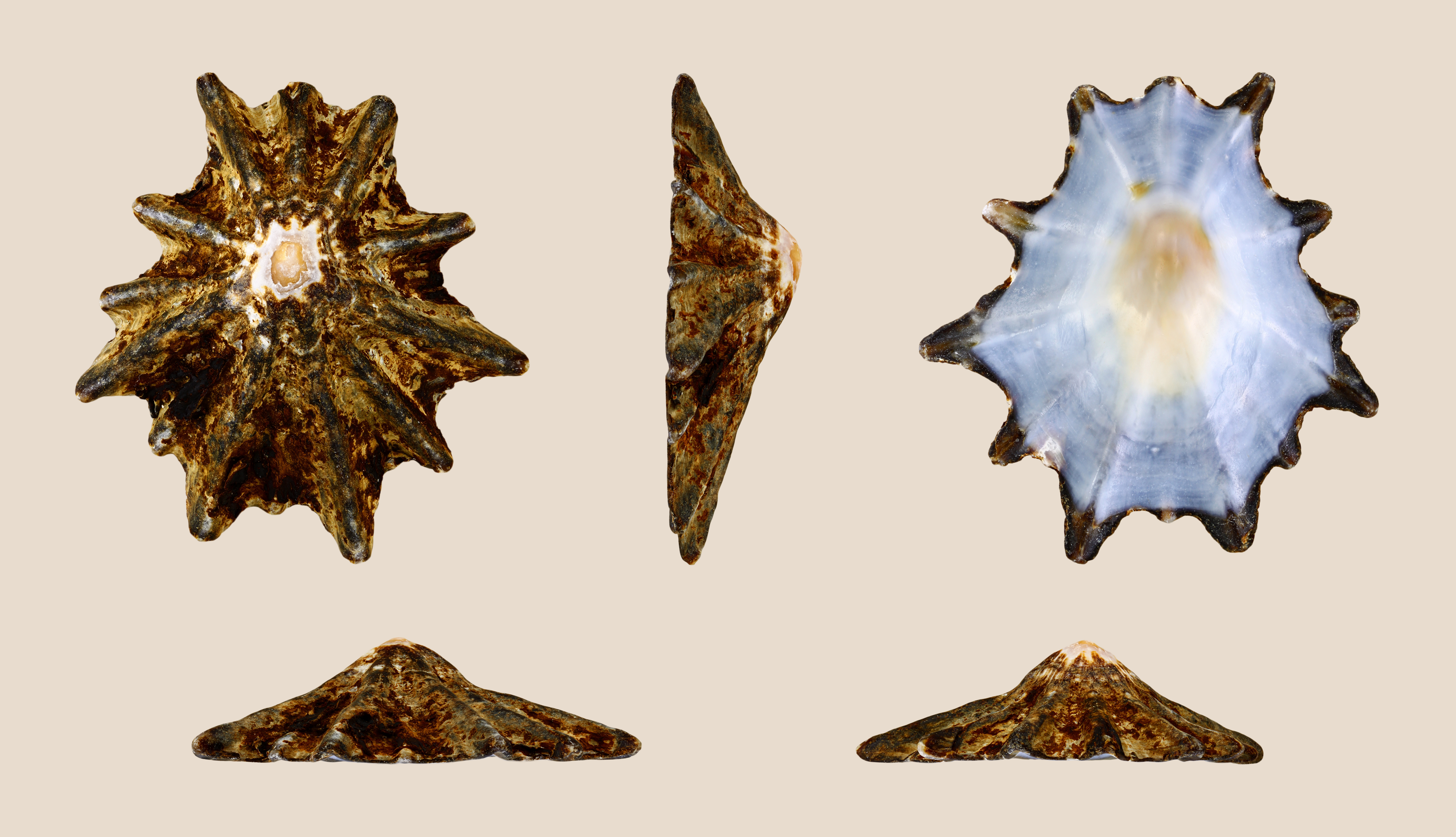
- Scutellastra longicosta

Scientific classification
- Kingdom: Animalia
- Phylum: Mollusca
- Class: Gastropoda
- Subclass: Patellogastropoda
- Family: Patellidae
- Genus: Scutellastra
- Species: S. longicosta

Binomial name
- Scutellastra longicosta (Lamarck, 1819)

Synonyms
- Patella (Scutellastra) longicosta Lamarck, 1819; Patella digitata Fischer von Waldheim, 1807; Patella longicosta Lamarck, 1819

= Scutellastra longicosta =

Species of gastropod

Scutellastra longicosta, the long-spined limpet or the duck's foot limpet, is a species of true limpet, a marine gastropod mollusc in the family Patellidae, one of the families of true limpets. It is native to the coasts of South Africa where it is found on the foreshore. It cultivates a species of crustose brown algae in a "garden".

== Description ==
Scutellastra longicosta has about eleven long, spiked ribs giving it a star-shaped outline. It grows to a diameter of about 70 mm (2.8 in). The inner surface is glossy white or bluish-white and often has a narrow black rim.

== Distribution and habitat ==
This species can be found on the eastern and southern coasts of South Africa. Its range extends from Richards Bay round Cape Province to the Cape of Good Hope. It is found in the mid-to-lower intertidal zone on rocky surfaces.

== Behaviour ==
Scutellastra longicosta is a territorial limpet occupying a permanent position and cultivating the brown alga Ralfsia verrucosa in a "garden" which it defends from other herbivores. The productivity of the cultivated algae is about 30% higher than it is when the algae grow elsewhere. It has been shown that Scutellastra cochlear, a closely related limpet, fertilises its algal garden with urea that accumulates round the rim of its shell when the limpet is exposed to the air at low tide and this may also be the case with Scutellastra longicosta. The cultivation of the garden is a form of mutualism as both limpet and alga derive benefit from the arrangement.

Larvae of Scutellastra longicosta tend to settle on the shells of larger limpets and the juveniles graze the encrusting alga that grows there. When they are large enough they move onto the rocks and graze on coralline algae before eventually setting up their own gardens. These are established by grazing hard to remove any algae growing on a rock surface and allowing settlement of R. verrucosa, this limpet's favoured food. The algal growth is then regularly grazed and maintained as turf, being fertilised by the limpet's faeces and by mucus. The garden is defended from other herbivores which the limpet pries off the surface with its spines. A 7 centimetres (2.8 in) limpet can "farm" an area of about 150 square centimetres (23 sq in), occupies a scar near the centre, and seldom moves out of this area. Gardens seldom overlap and even though the limpet is encouraging the growth of a single species of alga, there may be greater algal diversity in the area than might otherwise occur. This is because, while defending their gardens, the limpets drive off herbivores from the patches of rock between their gardens, giving algae settling there a greater chance of flourishing. Limpets experimentally removed from their territories and transplanted to nearby locations were found to have homing abilities and find their way back to their original gardens. Various predators feed on this limpet, especially the African oystercatcher.
