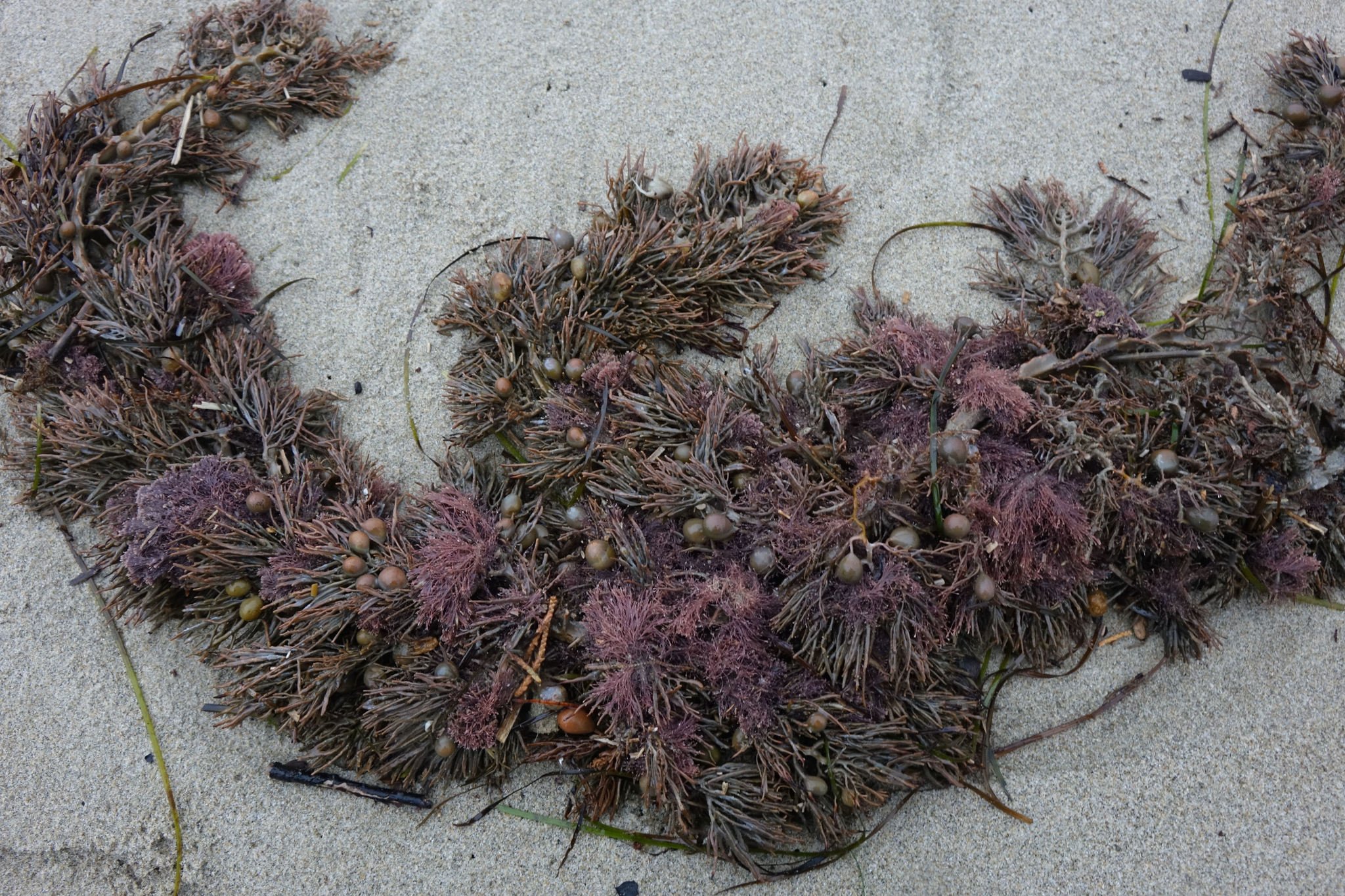

Scientific classification
- Domain: Eukaryota
- Clade: Sar
- Clade: Stramenopiles
- Phylum: Ochrophyta
- Class: Phaeophyceae
- Order: Fucales
- Family: Sargassaceae
- Genus: Cystophora
- Species: C. retroflexa

Binomial name
- Cystophora retroflexa (Labillardière) J.Agardh 1848

Synonyms
- Fucus retroflexus Labillardière 1807

= Cystophora retroflexa =

Species of seaweed

Cystophora retroflexa is a brown alga species in the genus Cystophora. It found is found off the coasts of New Zealand and Australia. It is the type species of the genus. Prefers more sheltered environments compared to other Cystophora species, often found in sheltered reefs from 0 to 12 m in depth.

== Description ==
It is a large, open species with floats longer (4–10 mm) than broad (3–6 mm). The final branches are long (20–60 mm) and thin (1–2 mm). The side branches have smaller branches arising at irregular intervals from all sides, rather than the seaweed having branches in the one plane.

== Biochemistry ==
This species contains phlorotannins of the classes of phlorethols and fucophlorethols (phloroglucinol, difucol, tetraphlorethol-E, pentaphlorethol-B, hexaphlorethol-A, fucotriphlorethol-G, fucotriphlorethol-H, fucotetraphlorethol-J, fucotetraphlorethol-K, fucopentaphlorethol-E, bisfucoheptaphlorethol-A, difucofucotriphlorethol-A, difucofucotetraphlorethol-B, terfucohexaphlorethol-B, terfucoheptaphlorethol-A, diphlorethol, triphlorethol-A, tetraphlorethol-C, fucophlorethol-B, fucodiphlorethol-D, fucotriphlorethol-B, fucotetra-phlorethol-B, bisfucotriphlorethol-A, bisfucotetraphlorethol-A, bisfucopentaphlorethol-A, bisfucopentaphlorethol-B, difucophlorethol-A, difucofucotetraphlorethol-A, terfucopentaphlorethol-A and terfucohexaphlorethol-A). There are also halogenated phlorethols and fucophlorethols (chlorinated, brominated and iodinated derivatives).
