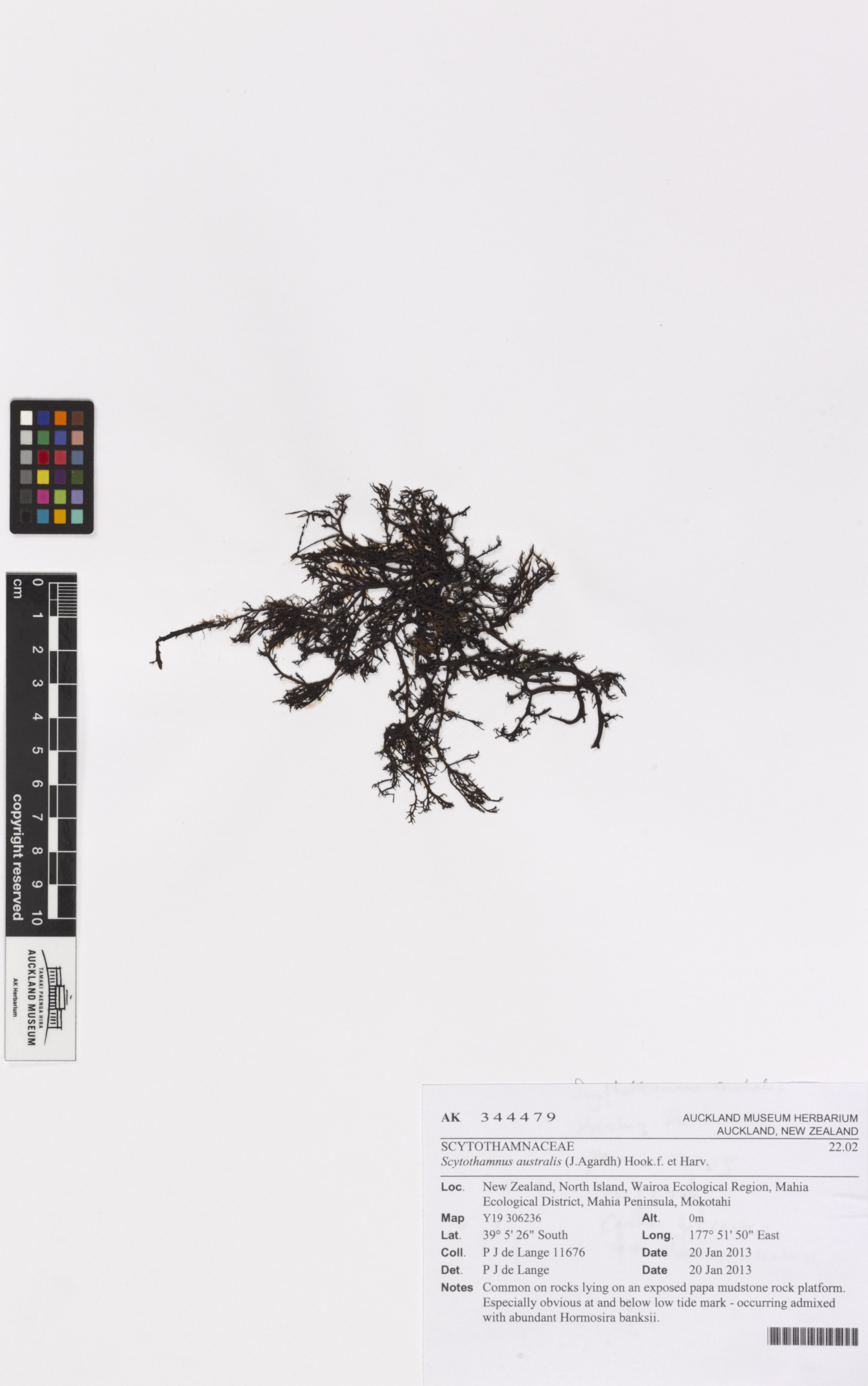
- Scytothamnus australis

Scientific classification
- Domain: Eukaryota
- Clade: Diaphoretickes
- Clade: SAR
- Clade: Stramenopiles
- Phylum: Gyrista
- Subphylum: Ochrophytina
- Class: Phaeophyceae
- Order: Scytothamnales
- Family: Splachnidiaceae; Mitchell & Whitting

Genera
- Scytothamnus; Splachnidium; Stereocladon

Synonyms
- Scytothamnaceae Womersley, 1987

= Splachnidiaceae =

Family of algae

Splachnidiaceae is a family of brown algae in the order Scytothamnales.
