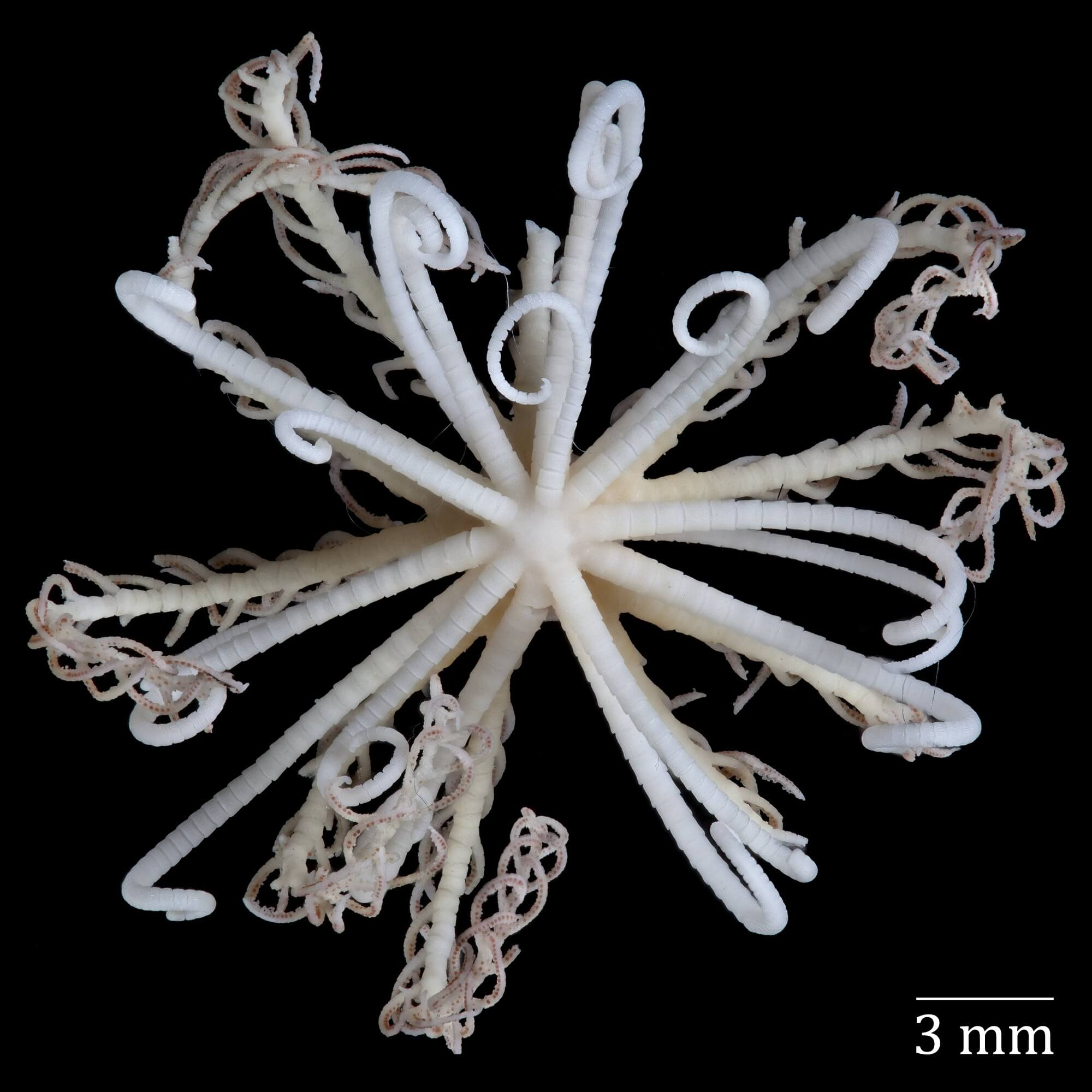

Scientific classification
- Kingdom: Animalia
- Phylum: Echinodermata
- Class: Crinoidea
- Superorder: Articulata
- Order: Comatulida
- Family: Aporometridae
- Genus: Aporometra
- Species: A. wilsoni

Binomial name
- Aporometra wilsoni (Bell, 1888)

Synonyms
- Antedon wilsoni Bell, 1888

= Aporometra wilsoni =

Species of crinoid

Aporometra wilsoni is a marine invertebrate, a species of crinoid or feather star in the family Aporometridae. It is found in shallow water around the coasts of southern Australia.

== Description ==
This is a small species of crinoid with arms up to 3 cm (1.2 in) long. The five arms each divide close to the base giving ten arms in total, with feather-like pinnules fanning out on either side. There are also up to 25 unusual cirri with flattened undersides which may be longer than the arms. Both the gonads, and the chambers in which the larvae are brooded, are located on the pinnules in this species.

== Distribution ==
This crinoid is native to the southern coasts of Australia. Its range extends from Elizabeth Reef, Perth, Western Australia, to Gabo Island, Victoria, at depths down to about 18 m (60 ft).

== Ecology ==
Aporometra wilsoni is found living in close association with brown algae such as Cystophora and Sargassum.

Crinoids are dioecious, with separate male and female individuals. They do not have true gonads, instead producing gametes from genital canals found inside some of the pinnules. In most species, the sperm and eggs are released into the water column when the pinnules rupture. However, A. wilsoni retains the embryos in cavities in the pinnules and brood the larvae as they develop. They are not released until the doliolaria larvae have lost their cilia and undergone metamorphosis, developing a stalk and holdfast. They fall to the seabed and immediately attach to the substrate, the mouth at the centre of the oral surface opens, the first tube feet emerge and they start to feed. The stem is later shed and the juvenile becomes free-living.
