= Tetrafucol A =

Names
- Preferred IUPAC name [1^{1},2^{1}:2^{3},3^{1}:3^{3},4^{1}-Quaterphenyl]-1^{2},1^{4},1^{6},2^{2},2^{4},2^{6},3^{2},3^{4},3^{6},4^{2},4^{4},4^{6}-dodecol
- Other names Tetrafucol-A

Identifiers
CAS Number	dodecaacetate: 57103-41-0
3D model (JSmol)	Interactive image; dodecaacetate: Interactive image
PubChem CID	71308278
CompTox Dashboard (EPA)	DTXSID901030419
- InChI: InChI=1S/C24H18O12/c25-7-1-9(27)17(10(28)2-7)19-13(31)5-15(33)21(23(19)35)22-16(34)6-14(32)20(24(22)36)18-11(29)3-8(26)4-12(18)30/h1-6,25-36H Key: OZBVFMWAUXWMKV-UHFFFAOYSA-N
- SMILES: Oc3cc(O)cc(O)c3-c4c(O)c(c(O)cc4O)-c(c1O)c(O)cc(O)c1-c2c(O)cc(O)cc2O; dodecaacetate: CC(=O)Oc1cc(OC(C)=O)c(-c2c(OC(C)=O)cc(OC(C)=O)c(-c3c(OC(C)=O)cc(OC(C)=O)c(-c4c(OC(C)=O)cc(OC(C)=O)cc4OC(C)=O)c3OC(C)=O)c2OC(C)=O)c(OC(C)=O)c1

Properties
Chemical formula	C_{24}H_{18}O_{12}
Molar mass	498.392 g/mol
- Except where otherwise noted, data are given for materials in their standard state (at 25 °C [77 °F], 100 kPa). Infobox references

Tetrafucol A is a fucol-type phlorotannin found in the brown algae Ascophyllum nodosum, Analipus japonicus and Scytothamnus australis.

In A. japonicus, 5'-bromo- and 5'-chlorotetrafucol-A can also be detected.
