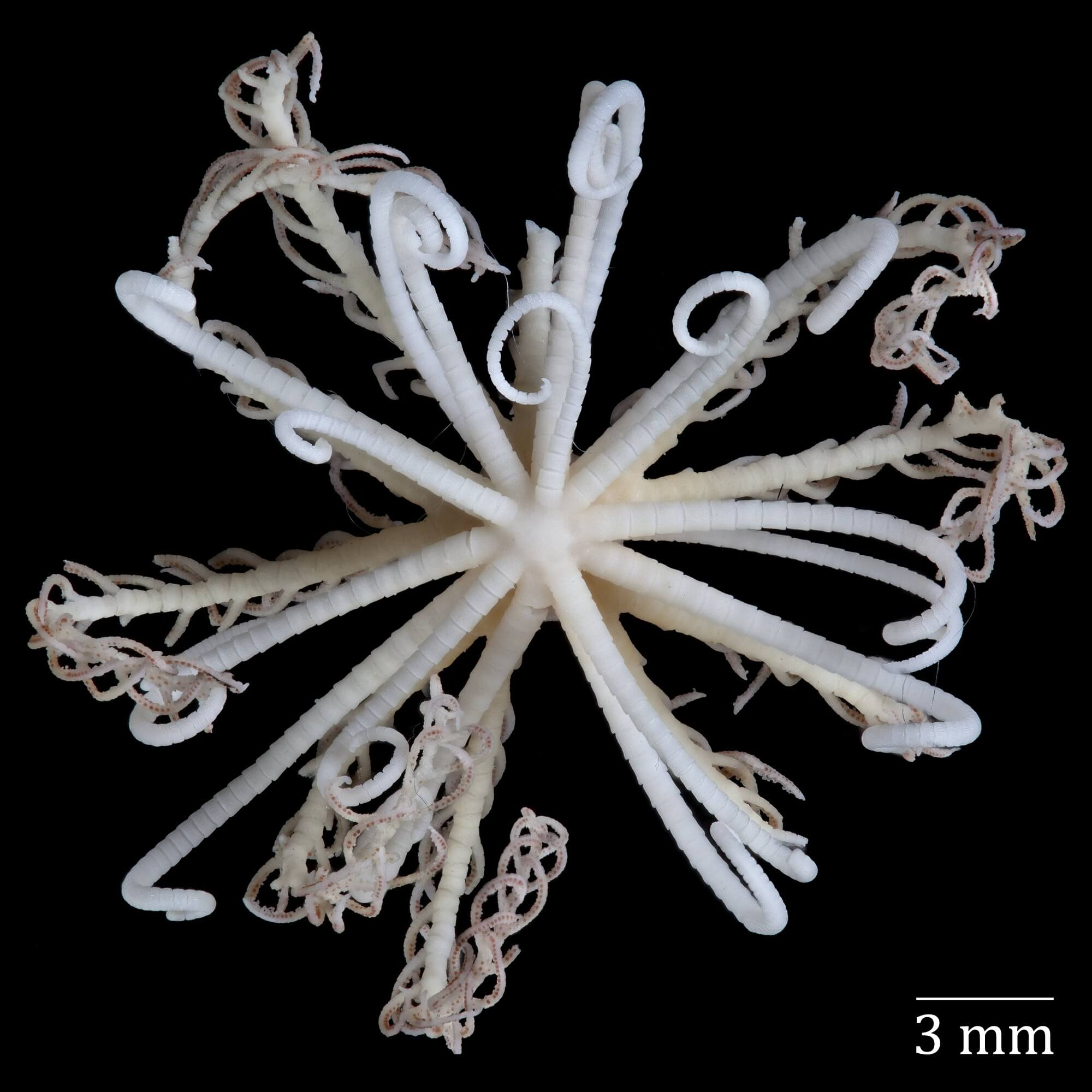
- Aporometra wilsoni showing arms and cirri

Scientific classification
- Kingdom: Animalia
- Phylum: Echinodermata
- Class: Crinoidea
- Superorder: Articulata
- Order: Comatulida
- Superfamily: Notocrinoidea
- Family: Aporometridae; H.L. Clark, 1938
- Genus: Aporometra; H.L. Clark, 1938

= Aporometra =

Family of crinoids

Aporometridae is a monotypic family of crinoids, the only genus being Aporometra, which contains three species, all endemic to the seas around Australia.

== Description ==
Members of this family have five arms which subdivide near the base giving them ten arms in total. The arms can reach 30 mm (1.2 in) in length and at the base of the calyx there are up to 25 cirri, often longer than the arms. Unique among Comatulida, the cirri are flattened on the underside. The gonads are located on the pinnules and not on the arms, and the embryos are brooded in cavities in the arms.

== Species ==
The World Register of Marine Species lists the following species in this genus:

- Aporometra occidentalis HL Clark, 1938
- Aporometra paedophora (HL Clark, 1909)
- Aporometra wilsoni (Bell, 1888)
