= Diphlorethol =

Names
- Preferred IUPAC name 2-(3,5-Dihydroxyphenoxy)benzene-1,3,5-triol

Identifiers
| CAS Number | 61237-21-6 |
| 3D model (JSmol) | Interactive image |
| ChemSpider | 10252245 |
| PubChem CID | 14020558 |
| UNII | TQN7SA39D4 |
| CompTox Dashboard (EPA) | DTXSID401030414 |
- InChI: InChI=1S/C12H10O6/c13-6-1-7(14)3-9(2-6)18-12-10(16)4-8(15)5-11(12)17/h1-5,13-17H Key: RUMGQPPKMHUYEF-UHFFFAOYSA-N
- SMILES: c2c(O)cc(O)cc2Oc1c(O)cc(O)cc1O

Properties
| Chemical formula | C_{12}H_{10}O_{6} |
| Molar mass | 250.20 g/mol |
- Except where otherwise noted, data are given for materials in their standard state (at 25 °C [77 °F], 100 kPa). Infobox references

Diphlorethol is a phlorotannin found in the brown alga Cystophora retroflexa. It falls under the phlorethols class of phlorotannins due to the ether bond that connects its two phloroglucinol units.
