= Difucol =

Names
- Preferred IUPAC name [1,1′-Biphenyl]-2,2′,4,4′,6,6′-hexol

Identifiers
CAS Number	4371-20-4
3D model (JSmol)	Interactive image
ChemSpider	383539
PubChem CID	433697
UNII	S9H4QFX4ME
CompTox Dashboard (EPA)	DTXSID701030413
- InChI: InChI=1S/C12H10O6/c13-5-1-7(15)11(8(16)2-5)12-9(17)3-6(14)4-10(12)18/h1-4,13-18H Key: PHDPNHJFOMABOA-UHFFFAOYSA-N; InChI=1/C12H10O6/c13-5-1-7(15)11(8(16)2-5)12-9(17)3-6(14)4-10(12)18/h1-4,13-18H Key: PHDPNHJFOMABOA-UHFFFAOYAY
- SMILES: Oc1cc(O)cc(O)c1-c2c(O)cc(O)cc2O

Properties
Chemical formula	C_{12}H_{10}O_{6}
Molar mass	250.20 g/mol
- Except where otherwise noted, data are given for materials in their standard state (at 25 °C [77 °F], 100 kPa). Infobox references

Difucol is a phlorotannin found in the brown algae Analipus japonicus and Cystophora retroflexa.
