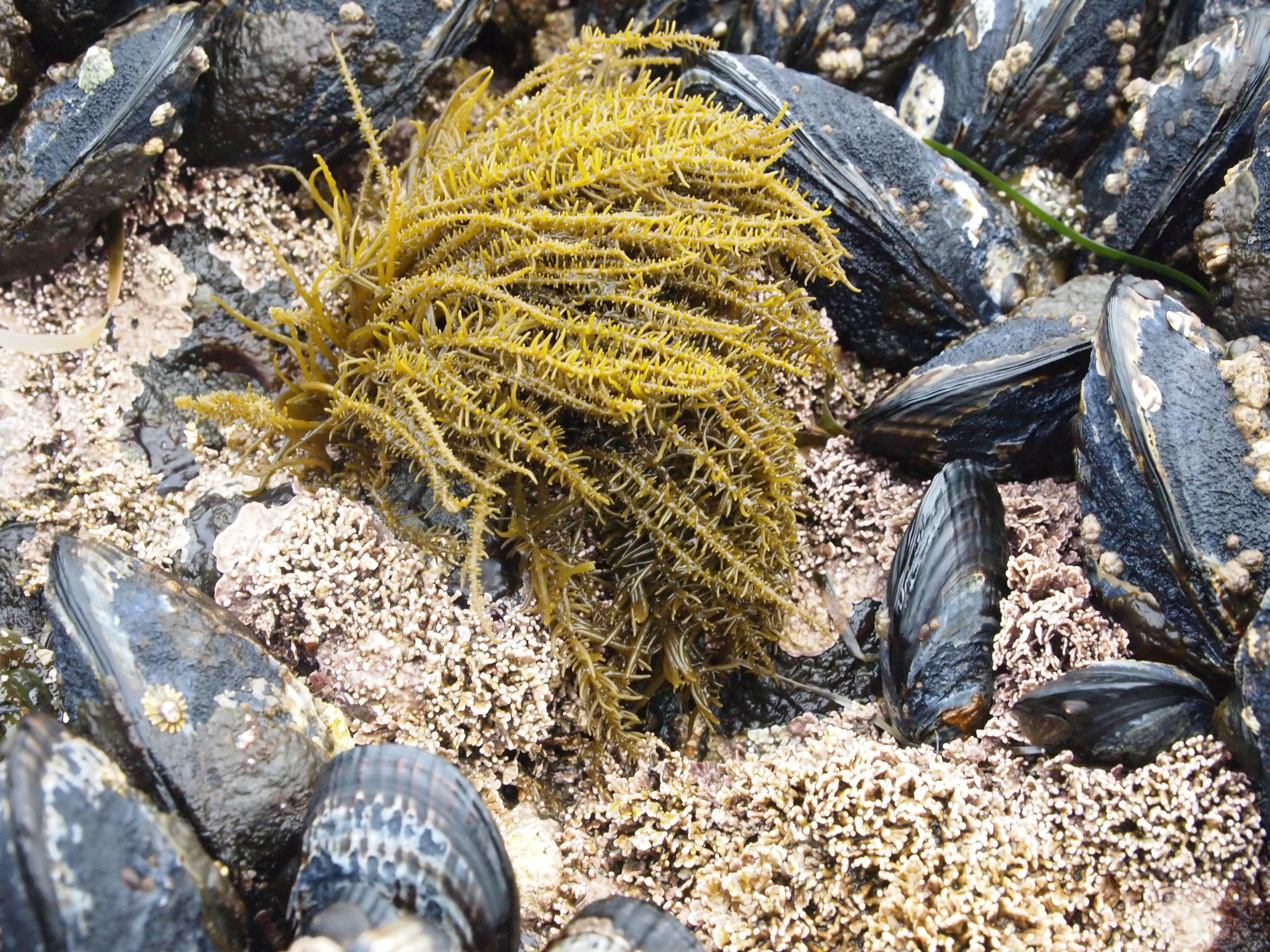
- Analipus japonica

Scientific classification
- Domain: Eukaryota
- Clade: Sar
- Clade: Stramenopiles
- Division: Ochrophyta
- Class: Phaeophyceae
- Order: Ralfsiales
- Family: Ralfsiaceae; Farlow, 1881

Genera
- See text

Synonyms
- Heterochrdariaceae Setchell & N.L.Gardner, 1925

= Ralfsiaceae =

Family of algae

Ralfsiaceae is a family of brown algae in the order Ralfsiales.

== Species ==
A 2014 classification of brown algae included the following genera:

- Analipus Kjellman, 1889
- Endoplura Hollenberg, 1969
- Heterochordaria Setchell & N.L.Gardner, 1924
- Heteroralfsia H.Kawai, 1989
- Ralfsia Berkeley, 1843

== See also ==
- Ralfsia verrucosa
