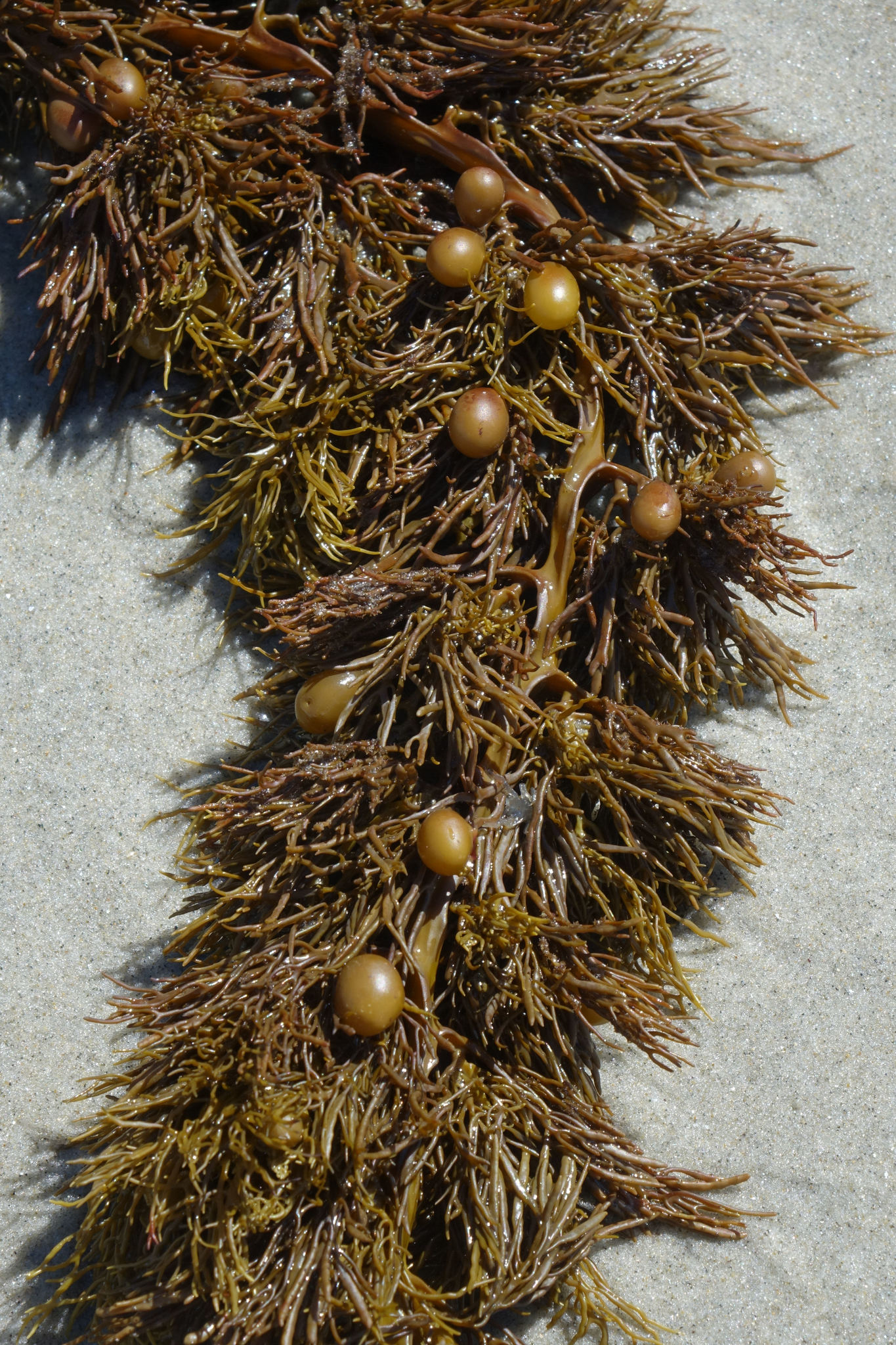
- Cystophora retroflexa

Scientific classification
- Domain: Eukaryota
- Clade: Diaphoretickes
- Clade: SAR
- Clade: Stramenopiles
- Phylum: Gyrista
- Subphylum: Ochrophytina
- Class: Phaeophyceae
- Order: Fucales
- Family: Sargassaceae
- Genus: Cystophora; J.Agardh, 1841

= Cystophora (alga) =

Genus of seaweeds

Cystophora is a genus of brown algae found mostly in temperate waters around Australia.

== Description ==
Most of the southern Australian species can be immediately recognised as belonging to this genus by their characteristic zigzag branching pattern. Identification of individual species is generally more difficult and relies on the size and shape of branches, particularly terminal branches, which are specialised reproductive structures known as receptacles. Due to their local diversity and dominance in southern Australia, they are regarded by some as 'the eucalypts of the underwater world'.

== Species ==
There are currently 26 accepted species of Cystophora:

- Cystophora botryocystis Sonder
- Cystophora brownii (Turner) J.Agardh
- Cystophora cuspidata J.Agardh
- Cystophora cymodocea Womersley & Nizamuddin ex Womersley
- Cystophora dumosa (Greville ex Sonder) J.Agardh
- Cystophora expansa Womersley
- Cystophora fibrosa Simons
- Cystophora flaccida J.Agardh
- Cystophora gracilis Womersley
- Cystophora grevillei (C.Agardh ex Sonder) J.Agardh
- Cystophora harveyi Womersley
- Cystophora intermedia J.Agardh
- Cystophora monilifera J.Agardh
- Cystophora moniliformis (Esper) Womersley & Nizamuddin
- Cystophora pectinata (Greville & C.Agardh ex Sonder) J.Agardh
- Cystophora platylobium (Mertens) J.Agardh
- Cystophora polycystidea Areschoug ex J.Agardh
- Cystophora racemosa (Harvey ex Kützing) J.Agardh
- Cystophora retorta (Mertens) J.Agardh
- Cystophora retroflexa (Labillardière) J.Agardh (type)
- Cystophora scalaris J.Agardh
- Cystophora siliquosa J.Agardh
- Cystophora subfarcinata (Mertens) J.Agardh
- Cystophora tenuis Womersley
- Cystophora torulosa (R.Brown ex Turner) J.Agardh
- Cystophora xiphocarpa Harvey
