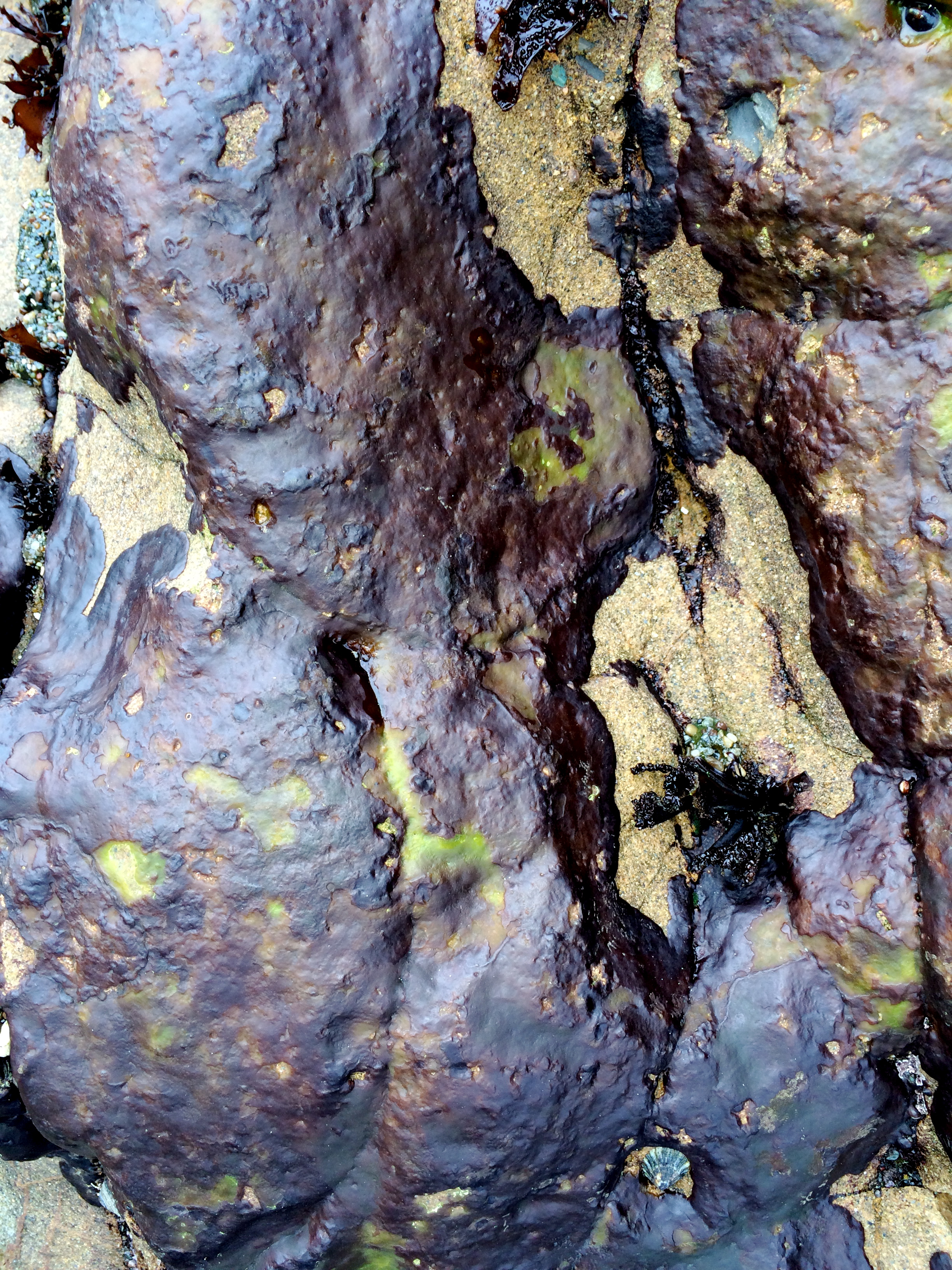
- Ralfsia pacifica (crustose brown algae).

Scientific classification
- Domain: Eukaryota
- Clade: Sar
- Clade: Stramenopiles
- Division: Ochrophyta
- Class: Phaeophyceae
- Subclass: Fucophycidae
- Order: Ralfsiales; Nakamura

Families
- Mesosporaceae; Neoralfsiaceae; Ralfsiaceae

= Ralfsiales =

Order of algae

Ralfsiales is an order of crustose brown algae (class Phaeophyceae) containing two families.
