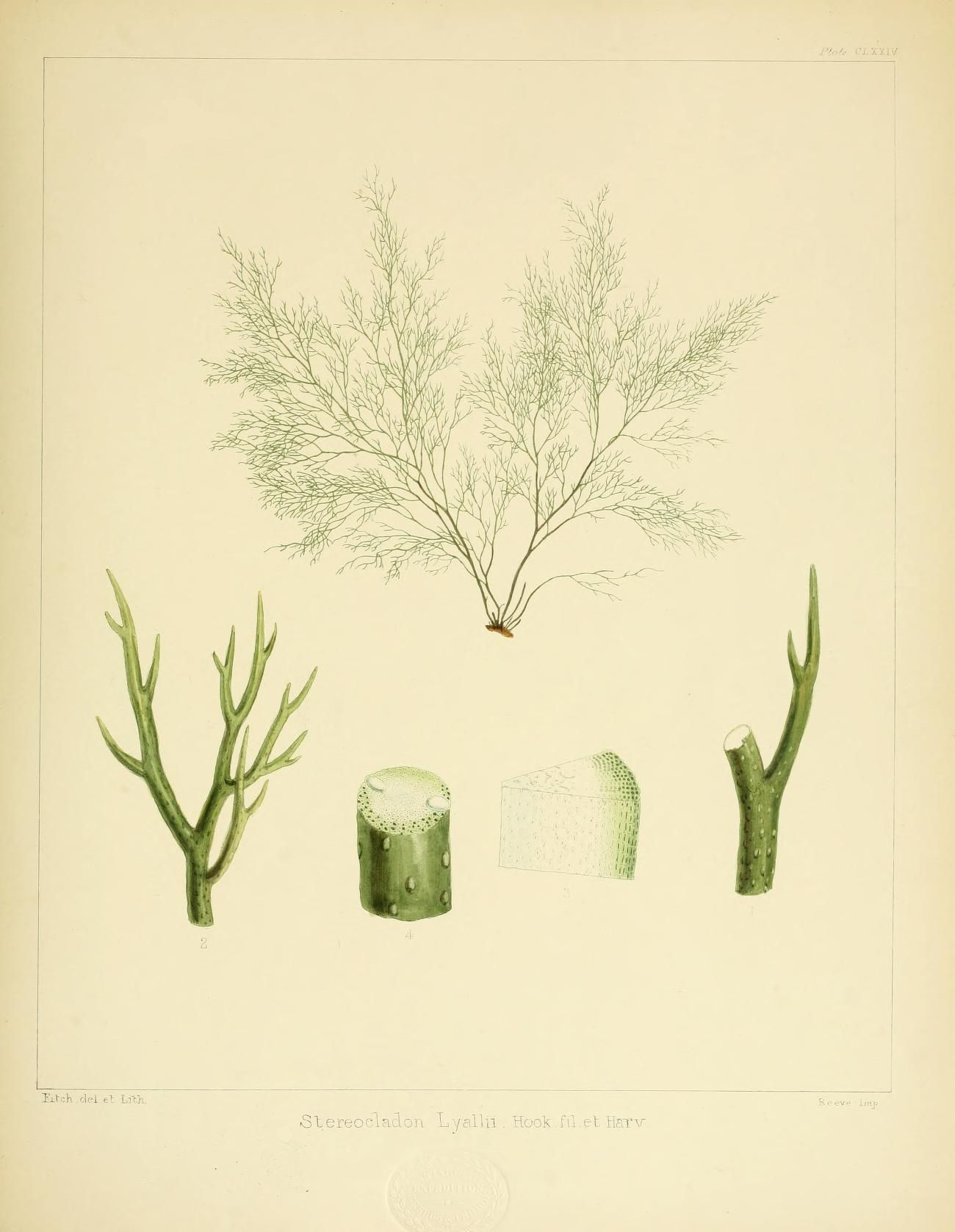

Scientific classification
- Domain: Eukaryota
- Clade: Diaphoretickes
- Clade: SAR
- Clade: Stramenopiles
- Phylum: Gyrista
- Subphylum: Ochrophytina
- Class: Phaeophyceae
- Subclass: Fucophycidae
- Order: Scytothamnales; A.F.Peters & M.N.Clayton

Families
- Asteronemataceae; Bachelotiaceae; Splachnidiaceae

= Scytothamnales =

Order of algae

Scytothamnales is an order of brown algae (class Phaeophyceae).
