= Wakame (disambiguation) =

Wakame most often refers to Undaria pinnatifida, an edible seaweed.

It may also refer to:

- Wakame Isono, the younger sister of Sazae Fuguta, the title character in the Sazae-san manga and anime series
- Kume no Wakame (?-781), a muraji and mother of Fujiwara no Momokawa, a statesman from the Nara period
- Wakame soup, also known as miyeok guk, a type of Korean soup made from the sea vegetable wakame
- Wakameshu, a Japanese liqueur made with wakame
- California wakame, or Alaria marginata, a species of the brown algae genus Alaria

== See also ==
- Wakamezake, a type of adult food play
