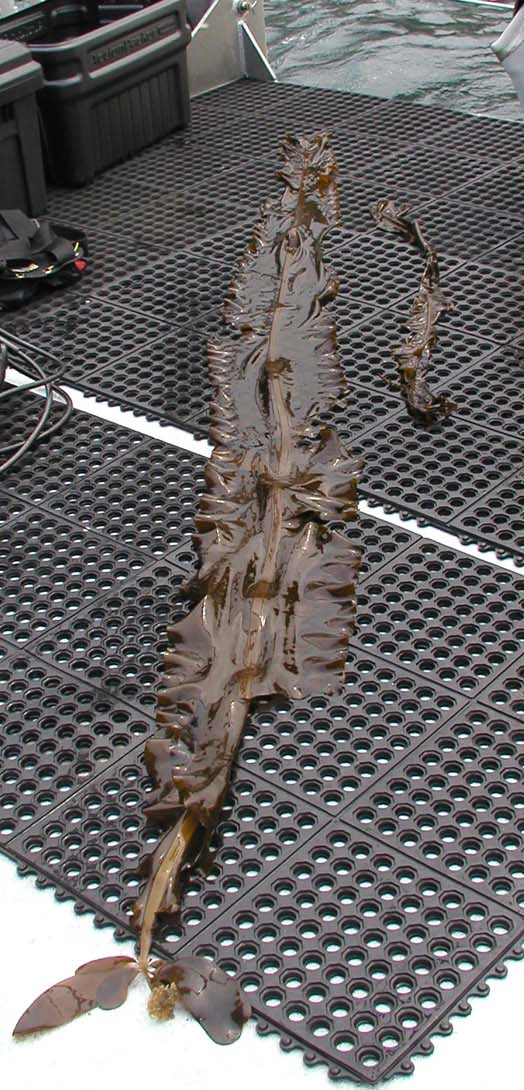
- Alaria marginata, offshore Big Sur, Monterey Bay NMS

Scientific classification
- Domain: Eukaryota
- Clade: Diaphoretickes
- Clade: SAR
- Clade: Stramenopiles
- Phylum: Gyrista
- Subphylum: Ochrophytina
- Class: Phaeophyceae
- Order: Laminariales
- Family: Alariaceae
- Genus: Alaria
- Species: A. marginata

Binomial name
- Alaria marginata Postels & Ruprecht 1840

= Alaria marginata =

Species of seaweed

Alaria marginata, the winged kelp, is a brown alga species in the genus Alaria. It can grow up to 13 feet. Fronds are long and narrow with raised midrib and wavy edges. Each frond has two rows of several smooth, oblong, 5 inch spore-bearing blades at the base in winter.

According to a study done by Widdowson(1971), the kelp Alaria marginata has been known to occupy certain wave-exosed intertidal habitats. These habitats can be found in the northeast Pacific from Alaska to near Point Conception, California. Alaria marginata has been the dominant macroalga on this exposed mid-to-low rocky shores along the Big Sur coast of California. The kelp commonly grows in large patches, which offers habitat and sustenance for tide pool organisms.

In the kelp species Alaria marginata, phenolics act as chemical defence against herbivores. Higher concentrations of the phenolics were found in the reproductive fronds when compared to the vegetative blades, which were consumed at a higher rate by herbivorous snails.

== Seasonal changes ==
According to a study done by McConnico and Foster in the Science Direct, thinning of the kelp patches was inversely related to density. During the growing season from February to July, the kelp would grow in length up to 1.4 meters a month to form thick canopies. The sorus development was found to be positively related to size and begins as early as March (peaking in late August-October). Releasing of the spores would take place most frequently between October and January, being associated with high water movement.

== Harvesting and uses ==
Alaria marginata are an edible kelp, commonly harvested in the spring and early summer to avoid frond harm from the summer storms. The upper frond and midrib can be harvested, leaving the lower portion of the frond to continue to grow.

Once harvested, the alaria marginata can be used fresh or dried. To dry, fronds are hung off clotheslines for an even preservation of both sides of the kelp. The midrib of the alaria marginata can be cut out, separating the two opposing sheets and the stiffer midrib. Dried fronds can be stored in strips or pieces in a cool, dry place.
