= A. esculenta =

A. esculenta may refer to:

- Alaria esculenta, a kelp species
- Aristoclesia esculenta, a synonym for Platonia insignis, a tree species native to South America in the humid forests of Brazil, Paraguay, parts of Colombia and northeast to Guyana

== See also ==
- List of Latin and Greek words commonly used in systematic names#E
