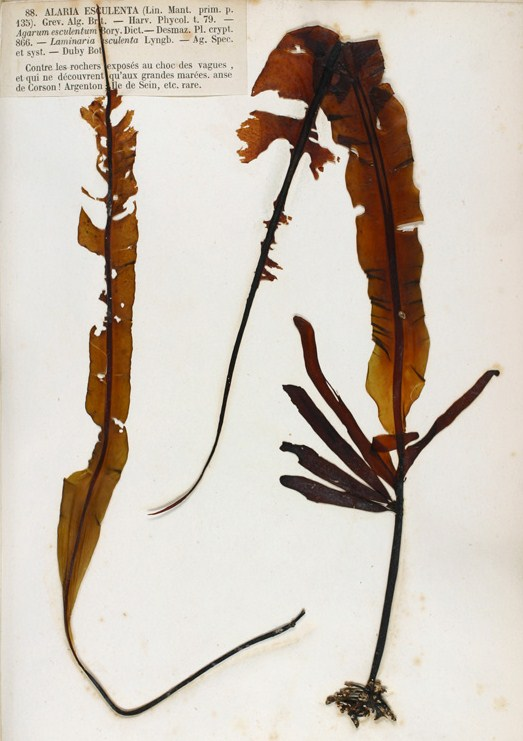

Scientific classification
- Domain: Eukaryota
- Clade: Sar
- Clade: Stramenopiles
- Division: Ochrophyta
- Class: Phaeophyceae
- Order: Laminariales
- Family: Alariaceae
- Genus: Alaria
- Species: A. esculenta

Binomial name
- Alaria esculenta (Linnaeus) Greville

= Alaria esculenta =

Edible seaweed

Alaria esculenta is an edible seaweed, also known as dabberlocks or badderlocks, or winged kelp, and occasionally as Atlantic Wakame. It is a traditional food along the coasts of the far north Atlantic Ocean. It may be eaten fresh or cooked in Greenland, Iceland, Scotland and Ireland. It is the only one of twelve species of Alaria to occur in both Ireland and in Great Britain.

== Description ==
Grows to a maximum length of 2 m. The whole frond is brown and consists of a distinct midrib with wavy membranous lamina up to 7 cm wide on either side. The frond is unbranched and tapers towards the end. The base has a short stipe arising from a rhizoidal holdfast. The stipe may bear several sporophylls which are club-shaped and up to 20 cm long and 5 cm broad which bear the spores.

It grows from a short cylindrical stipe attached to the rocks by a holdfast of branching root-like rhizoids and grows to about 20 cm long. The stipe is continued into the frond forming a long conspicuous midrib, all other large and unbranched brown algae to be found in the British Isles are without a mid-rib. The lamina is thin, membranous with a wavy margin.

== Reproduction ==
Sporangia grow in club shaped narrow leafy outgrowths produced near the base growing from the stipe. These grow to 20 cm long and 5 cm broad.

== Distribution and ecology ==
Alaria esculenta is well known in Ireland, where it is known as Láir or Láracha, and in the rest of the British Isles save the south and east of England. It is perennial.

It is a common large algae on shores where there is severe wave exposure attached to rocks just below low-watermark in the "Laminaria belt", and is common on rocky shores in exposed places. It has a fairly high intrinsic growth rate compared to other algae, 5.5% per day and a carrying capacity of about 2 kg wet weight per square meter. It may reach lengths of about 2.5 m. It overlaps to a small degree (+) in distribution with Fucus serratus and somewhat more with Laminaria digitata. It has low and high light limitation values of about 5 and 70 W per square meter respectively. Its distribution is also limited by salinity, wave exposure, temperature, desiccation and general stress. These, and other attributes of the algae are summarized in Lewis (1964) and Seip 1980.

Leaf-like sporophylls develop from the stipe and produce zoospores.

A. esculenta may produce phlorotannins and oxidized lipids as protective functions against high photosynthetically active and UV radiations.

It is host to the pathogenic fungus Phycomelaina laminariae.

== World distribution ==
Europe: Atlantic France, Channel Islands, Britain, Ireland, Netherlands, Heligoland, Baltic, Iceland, Faroes, Norway and Svalbard; North America: New York, New England, Maritime Provinces, Newfoundland, Quebec, Labrador, Alaska, Canadian Arctic and Greenland; Asia: Japan, Korea, Kuriles, Sakhalin and Kamchatka.

== See also ==
- Edible seaweed
- Seafood allergy
- Vitamin B12
