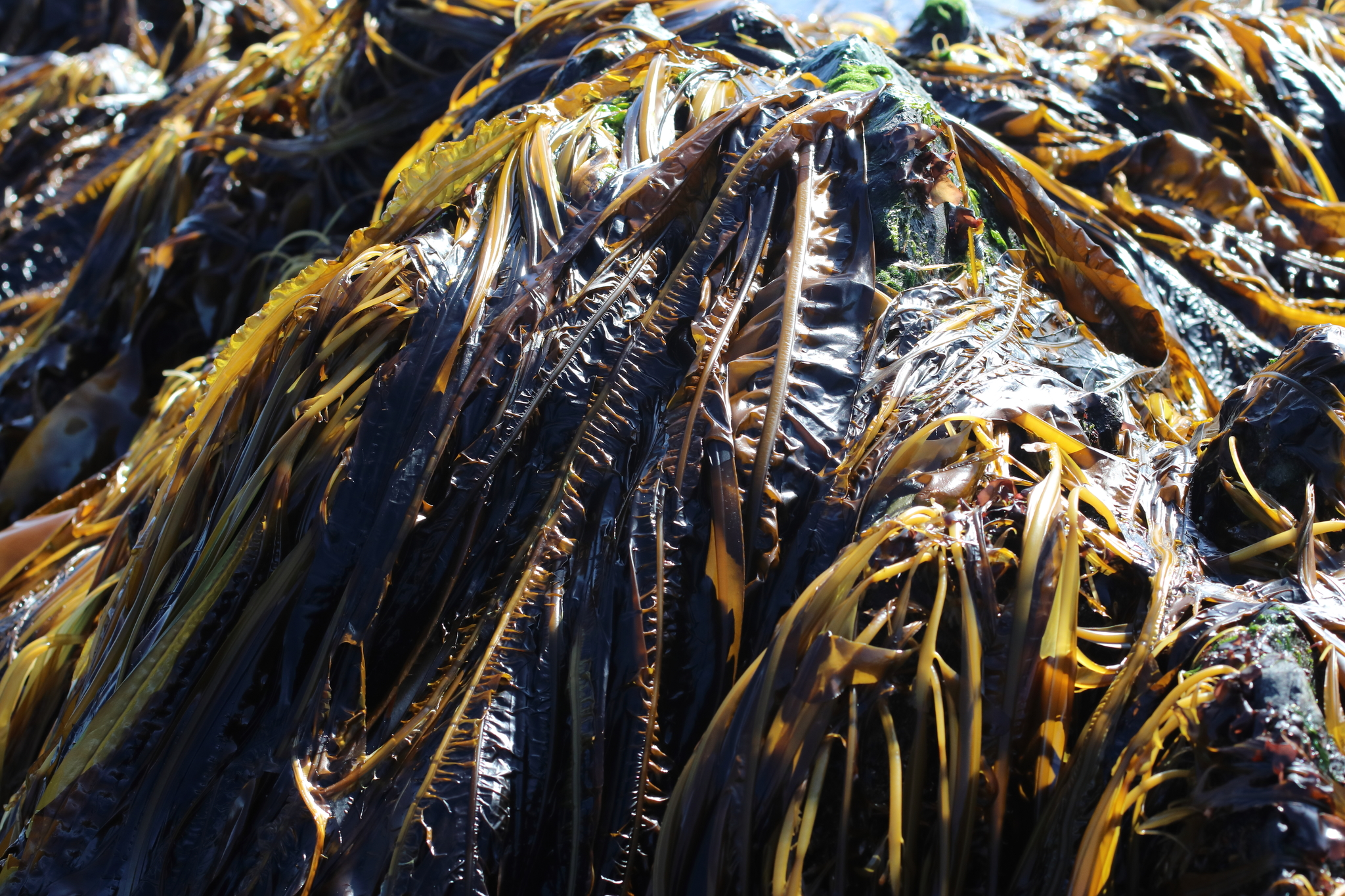
- Eualaria fistulosa on the Kenai Peninsula, Alaska

Scientific classification
- Domain: Eukaryota
- Clade: Sar
- Clade: Stramenopiles
- Division: Ochrophyta
- Class: Phaeophyceae
- Order: Laminariales
- Family: Alariaceae
- Genus: Eualaria; Areschoug 1884
- Species: E. fistulosa

Binomial name
- Eualaria fistulosa (Postels & Ruprecht) M.J.Wynne 2009

Synonyms
- Alaria fistulosa Postels & Ruprecht 1840; Alaria fistulosa f. platyphylla Setchell 1901; Alaria fistulosa f. stenophylla Setchell 1903; Orgyia fistulosa (Postels & Ruprecht) Trevisan 1845; Phasganon fistulosum (Postels & Ruprecht) Ruprecht 1850; Druehlia fistulosa (Postels & Ruprecht) C.E.Lane & G.W.Saunders 2007

= Eualaria =

Genus of kelp

Eualaria is a monotypic genus of subtidal kelp containing the species Eualaria fistulosa (synonym Alaria fistulosa). Its native Alaskan name is Kausam.

== Description ==
The entire plant consists of a holdfast and a single very large frond or lamina. In one instance, at Anchor Point, Cook Inlet, Alaska, a lamina collected by Griggs and Rigg was 22 meters (72 ft) long by 170 cm (67 in) wide. Other laminae have been measured as wide as 252 cm (99 in) and others as long as 25 m (82 ft) Unusually among kelps, the laminae of Eualaria have midribs.

== Distribution and habitat ==
It is native to the northern Pacific Ocean, where it ranges from the coast of Alaska and the Aleutian Islands to the Commander Islands, Russian Far East, Sakhalin, Kuril Islands, and Japan. It grows in the subtidal zone to a depth of 10 meters.
