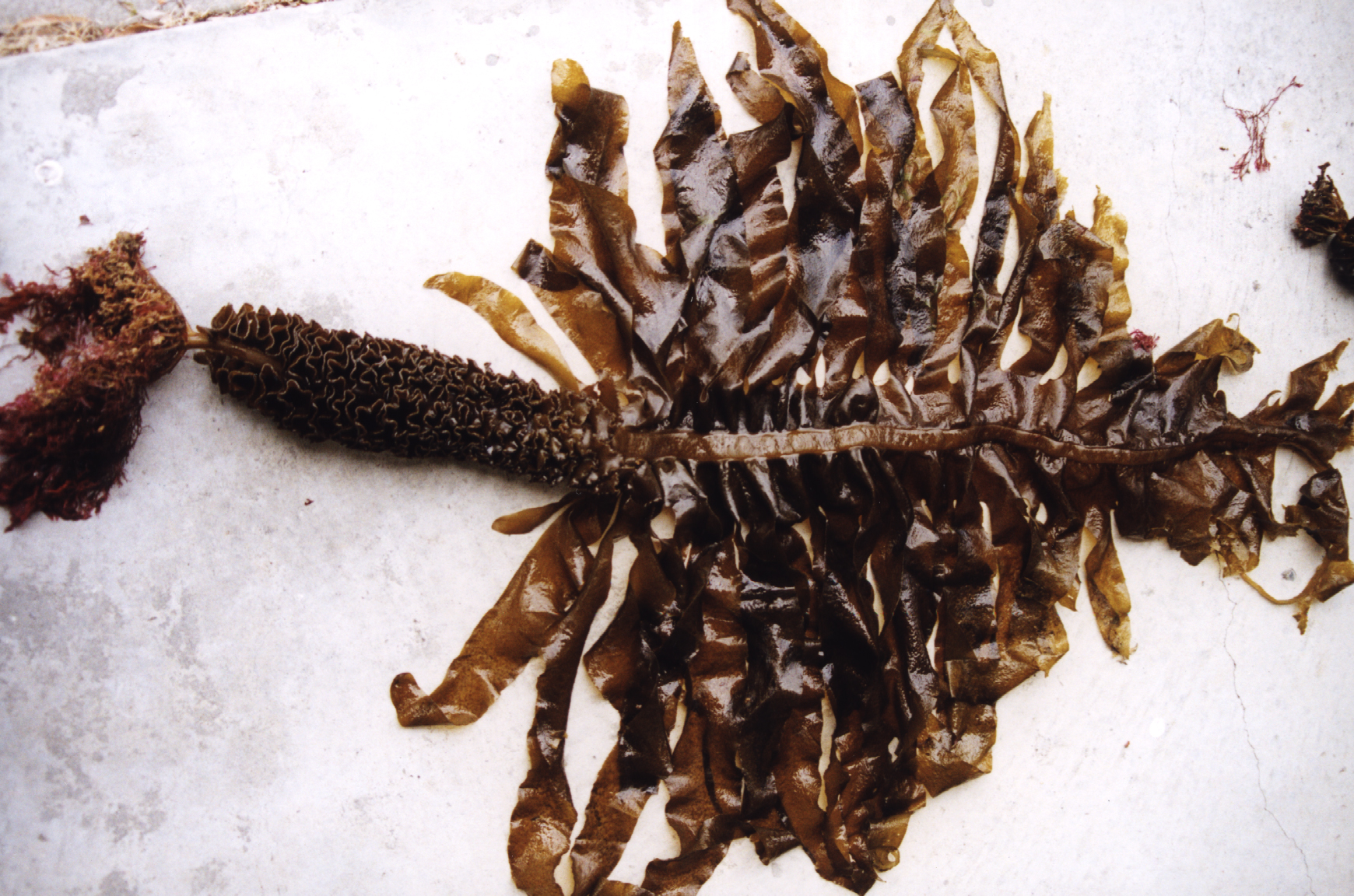

Scientific classification
- Domain: Eukaryota
- Clade: Sar
- Clade: Stramenopiles
- Division: Ochrophyta
- Class: Phaeophyceae
- Order: Laminariales
- Family: Alariaceae
- Genus: Undaria; Suringar, 1873

Species
- Undaria crenata Undaria peterseniana Undaria pinnatifida Undaria undarioides

= Undaria =

Genus of seaweeds

Undaria is a genus of kelp that includes Undaria pinnatifida (wakame).
