= Phycomelaina =

Scientific classification
- Kingdom: Fungi
- Division: Ascomycota
- Class: Sordariomycetes
- Order: Phyllachorales
- Family: Phyllachoraceae
- Genus: Phycomelaina; Kohlm.

Type species
- Phycomelaina laminariae

Genus of fungi

Phycomelaina is a genus of fungi in the family Phyllachoraceae. This is a monotypic genus, containing the single species Phycomelaina laminariae.

In Iceland, it has been reported infecting Alaria esculenta, Laminaria digitata and Saccharina latissima.
