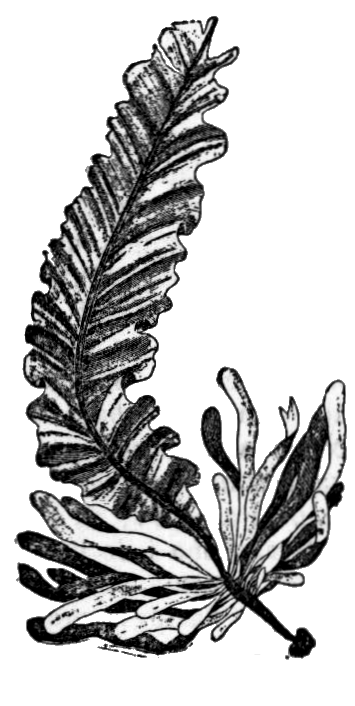
- Alaria esculenta

Scientific classification
- Domain: Eukaryota
- Clade: Sar
- Clade: Stramenopiles
- Division: Ochrophyta
- Class: Phaeophyceae
- Order: Laminariales
- Family: Alariaceae
- Genus: Alaria; Greville, 1830

= Alaria (alga) =

Genus of algae

Alaria is a genus of brown alga (Phaeophyceae) comprising approximately 17 species. Members of the genus are dried and eaten as a food in Western Europe, China, Korea, Japan (called sarumen), and South America. Distribution of the genus is a marker for climate change, as it relates to oceanic temperatures.

The most common species, Alaria esculenta is a large brown seaweed common on the shores of the British Isles. It has been studied for its potential for aquaculture.

== Description ==
Alaria is a genus of highly variable brown algae, and a member of the order Laminariales, more commonly known as kelp. It has mature sporophytes as small as 15 centimetres (5.9 in) and as large at 15 metres (49 ft) in length. It does not show definite air-floats. All species’ sporophytes consist of a ramified holdfast, an unbranched cylindrical stipe, and a blade with a percurrent, cartilaginous midrib, Alaria is frequently found with lacerations running from the margin to the midrib caused by the ravages of the sea.

== Taxonomy ==
Alaria the second largest genus of Laminariales, with about 17 currently recognized species. However, due to its highly plastic morphology, the kelp has over 100 specific and subspecific names, which have arisen since it was first described in 1830. These synonyms have been tailored down to the present species through genetic comparisons.

=== Species ===
The species currently recognised are:

- Alaria angusta
- Alaria crassifolia, sarumen, ezo-wakame
- Alaria crispa
- Alaria dolichorhachis
- Alaria elliptica
- Alaria esculenta
- Alaria fragilis
- Alaria grandifolia
- Alaria marginata
- Alaria oblonga
- Alaria paradisea
- Alaria praelonga
- Alaria pylaiei

== Distribution ==
=== Biogeographical ===
Alaria is most commonly found in far northern waters of the Pacific and Atlantic oceans, with the greatest variety of species concentrated in the north Pacific. More specifically, it has been found on the coasts of England, Ireland, Scotland, Iceland, Greenland, Denmark, Norway, Japan, China, Korea, Canada, and the United States.

=== Ecological ===
Alaria is typically found in the sublittoral zones, at a depth of 3–10 metres (10–33 ft). An important factor in Alaria’s distribution is temperature; it is limited by sea temperature of 16°C. and greater. Presumably due to this factor, and rising sea temperatures, the genus has largely disappeared from the English Channel within the past 100 years. Recent research conducted on Alaria esculenta in the Arctic showed pronounced temperature effects on the photosynthesis and germination of the algae.

== Life history ==
As with all kelps, Alaria demonstrate a heteromorphic, sporic life history, with a macroscopic, dominant sporophyte, and a microscopic gametophyte. Unique to the genus Alaria is that the sori of the unilocular sporangia are restricted to certain blades, the sporophylls. The sporophylls are formed as lateral blades from the stipe. Most species are perennial; after reproduction, the blade sloughs off, leaving the stipe and meristem. The persisting meristem produces a new blade at the beginning of the next growing season.

== Uses ==
=== Human consumption ===
In Ireland, Scotland, Greenland, Iceland, Denmark, and the Faroe Islands, the midrib is removed, and the blade and sometimes the leaflets are eaten, although it is not commercially available. It is more commonly eaten in the Far East (China, Japan, and Korea), where seaweed consumption is much more popular than in the West. Seaweeds are considered to be highly nutritious, because typically they are low in fat, and have vitamins and minerals in amounts comparable or superior to terrestrial vegetables. Alaria esculenta, in particular, is an excellent source of protein and iodine.

== Also known as... ==
- "Badderlocks", "dabberlocks" or "henware" in Scotland proper
- "Honey-ware" in the Orkney Islands (Northern Scotland)
- "Murlins", "láir", and "láracha" in Ireland
- "Wing kelp" unknown origin
- "California nori"
- "Wild nori"
- "California wakame"
