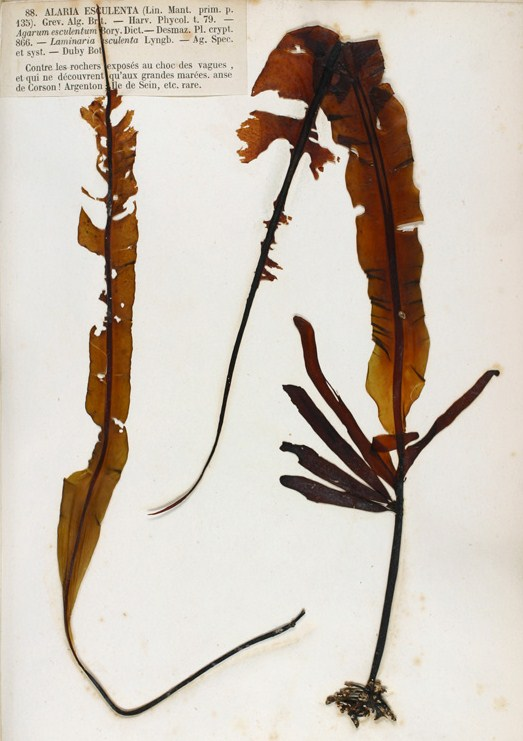
- Alaria esculenta

Scientific classification
- Domain: Eukaryota
- Clade: Diaphoretickes
- Clade: Sar
- Clade: Stramenopiles
- Phylum: Gyrista
- Subphylum: Ochrophytina
- Class: Phaeophyceae
- Order: Laminariales
- Family: Alariaceae

Genera
- See text

= Alariaceae =

Family of seaweeds

Alariaceae are a family of brown algae in the order Laminariales.

== Genera ==
- Alaria Areschoug
- Aureophycus
- Eualaria Areschoug
- Lessoniopsis Reinke
- Pleurophycus Setchell & Saunders ex J.Tilden
- Pterygophora Ruprecht
- Undaria Suringar (e.g. wakame)
- Undariella Y.P.Petrov & Kussakin

== Distribution ==
The distribution of Alariaceae includes the northeastern Pacific Ocean, South Africa, southern Australia, and New Zealand coasts.
