= Miyeok-guk =

Korean soup

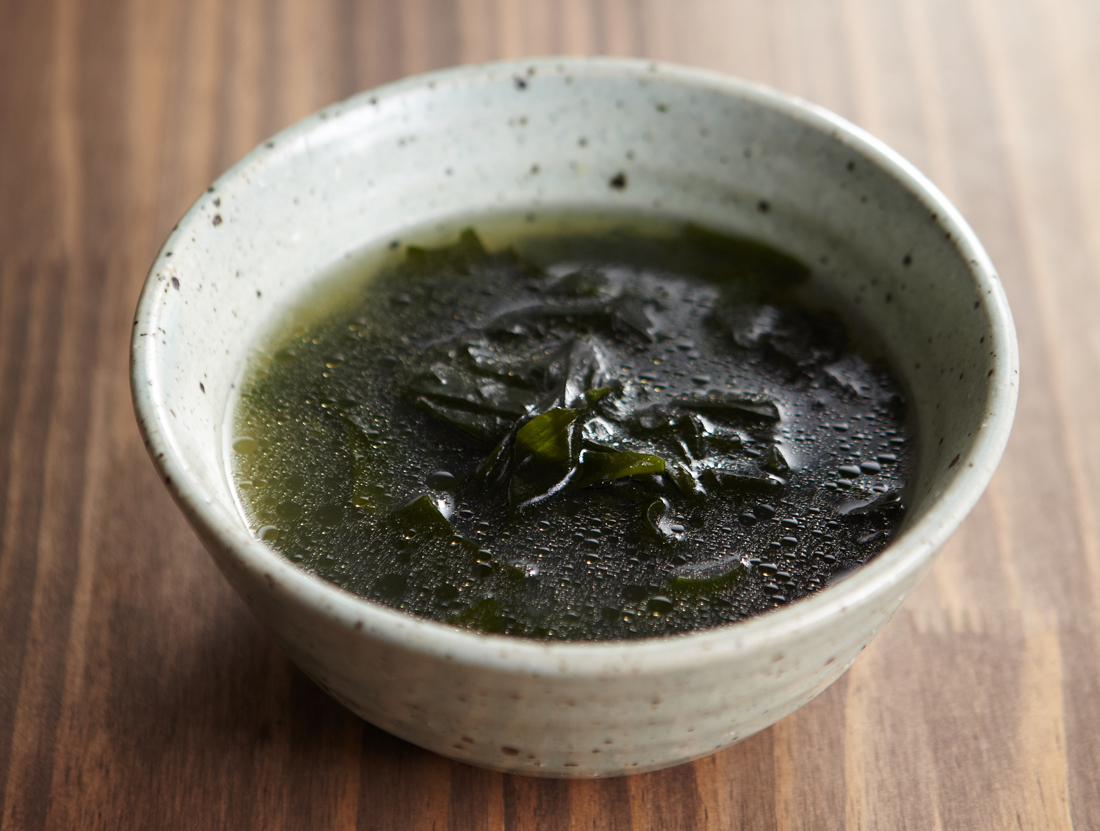
- Alternative names: Seaweed soup
- Type: Guk
- Place of origin: Korea
- Main ingredients: Brown seaweed or wakame

Korean name
- Hangul: 미역국
- RR: miyeokguk
- MR: miyŏkkuk
- IPA: [mi.jʌk̚.k͈uk̚]

Miyeok-guk (Korean: 미역국), also rendered as miyuk guk or seaweed soup, is a non-spicy Korean soup whose main ingredient is miyeok (seaweed). It is traditionally eaten as a birthday dish in honor of one's mother and by women who have given birth for several months postpartum.

== Preparation ==
Miyeok-guk is rare among Korean soups in that it has no spicy ingredients. The main ingredient is miyeok, also known as sea mustard. It is typically prepared from dried product, and is in appearance brown tangled strands. To prepare, the seaweed is rehydrated, drained, chopped, sauteed with garlic and sesame oil, then simmered in beef or fish stock.

== History and culture ==
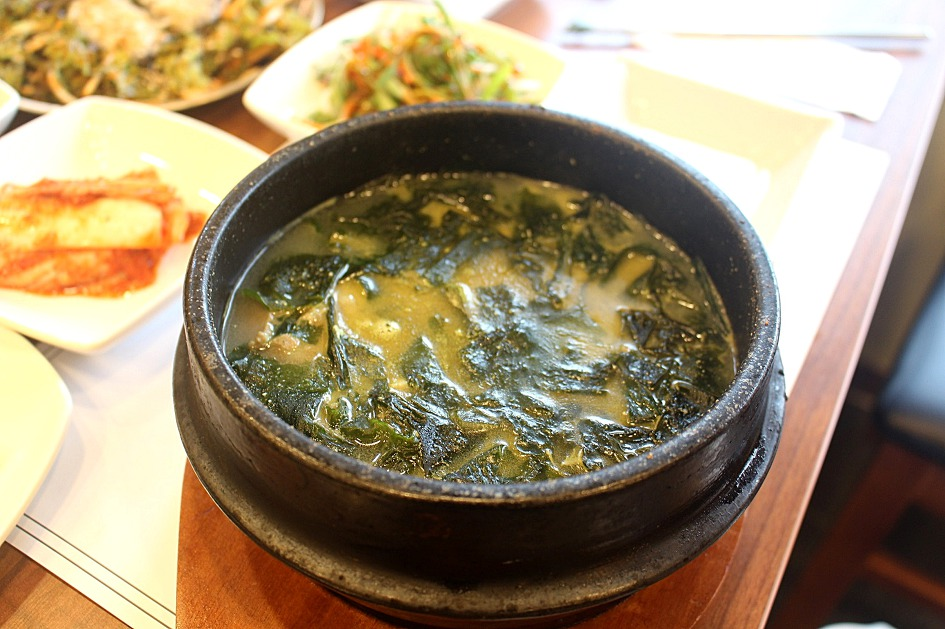
A bowl of So-gogi-miyeok-guk (beef seaweed soup)

Women traditionally eat the soup for several months after giving birth. The practice of eating seaweed soup after giving birth is believed to date to the Goguryeo period and started because people noticed whales eating seaweed after giving birth. Traditionally the soup symbolizes and honors Samsin Halmoni, a goddess who helps women through pregnancy and childbirth. People enjoying the dish on their birthdays are honoring their mothers for giving birth to them.

People also eat the soup for breakfast on their birthdays in honor of their mother. As part of birthday celebrations, guests are served miyeok-guk along with rice cakes and other traditional foods. Miyeok-guk is also eaten outside of special occasions during the rest of the year. It is a very common side dish served with rice.

== Nutrition ==
Seaweed is a good source of vitamin K, an essential vitamin, which is an important factor in blood-clotting. Eating miyeok-guk that contains a cup of seaweed enables one to absorb around 22% of the recommended daily vitamin K requirement for women and 29% of the recommended daily vitamin K requirement for men.

== Popular belief ==
A dictionary published by the Hangeul Society in 1957 notes that "Eating Miyeok-guk" was defined as "a word that means an organization dissolves or falls apart." This is believed to have originated from the fact that when the Joseon Army was disbanded, it could not express it directly, instead stating "I ate Miyeok-guk."

== See also ==
- List of soups
