= Sporophyll =

Plant leaf which produces spores

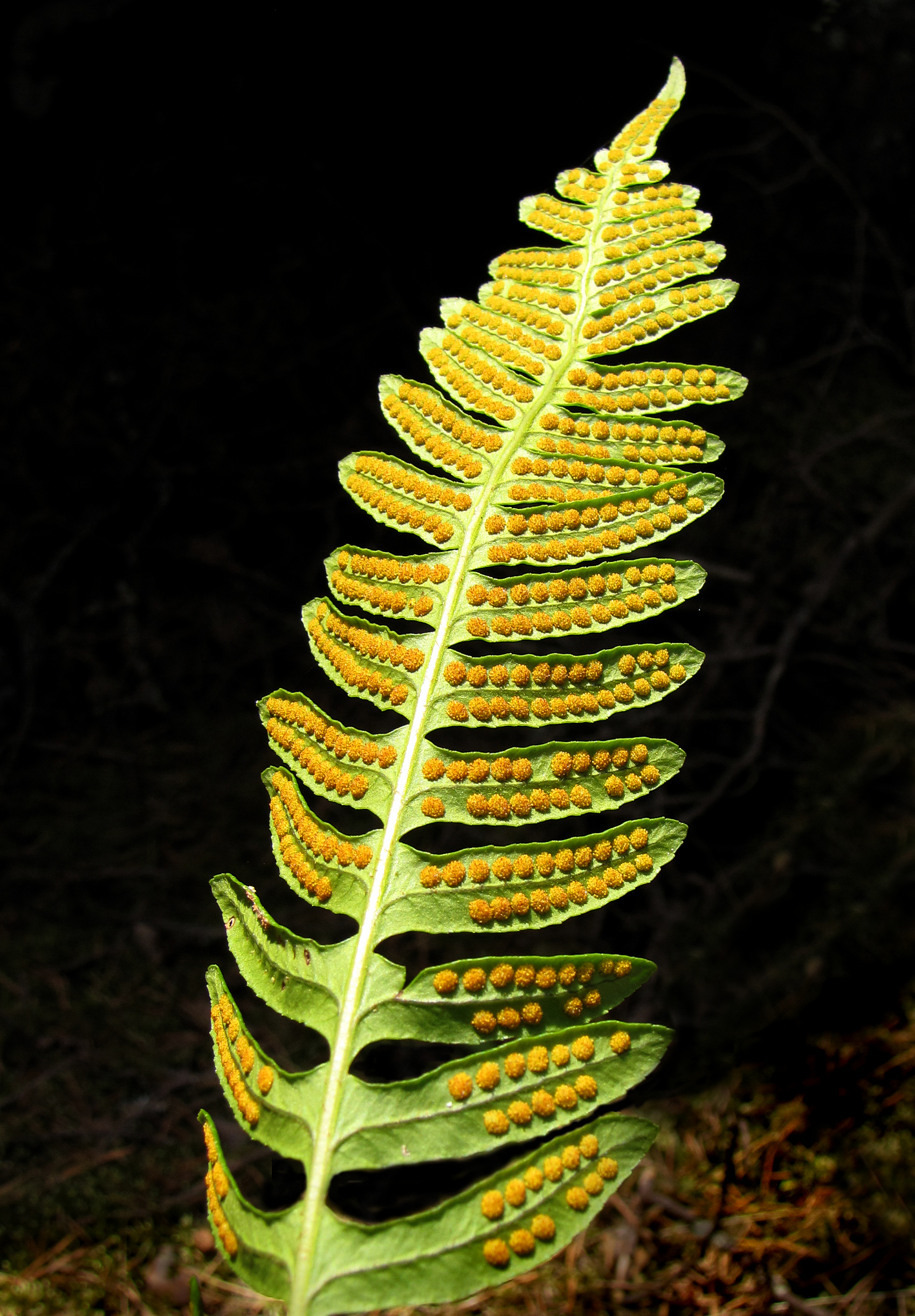
The sporophyll of a fern. It is a fertile leaf bearing reproductive structures.

In botany, a sporophyll is a leaf that bears sporangia. Both microphylls and megaphylls can be sporophylls. In heterosporous plants, sporophylls (whether they are microphylls or megaphylls) bear either megasporangia and thus are called megasporophylls, or microsporangia and are called microsporophylls. The overlap of the prefixes and roots makes these terms a particularly confusing subset of botanical nomenclature.

Sporophylls vary greatly in appearance and structure, and may or may not look similar to sterile leaves. Plants that produce sporophylls include:

Alaria esculenta, a brown alga which shows sporophylls attached near the base of the alga.

Lycophytes, where sporophylls may be aggregated into strobili (Selaginella and some Lycopodium and related genera) or distributed singly among sterile leaves (Huperzia). Sporangia are borne in the axil or on the adaxial surface of the sporophyll. In heterosporous members, megasporophylls and microsporophylls may be intermixed or separated in a variety of patterns.

Ferns, which may produce sporophylls that are similar to sterile fronds or that appear very different from sterile fronds. These may be non-photosynthetic and lack typical pinnae, e.g. Onoclea sensibilis.

Cycads produce strobili, both pollen-producing and seed-producing, that are composed of sporophylls.

Ginkgo produces microsporophylls aggregated into a pollen strobilus. Ovules are not born on sporophylls.

Gymnosperms, like Ginkgo and cycads, produce microsporophylls, aggregated into pollen strobili. However, unlike these other groups, ovules are produced on cone scales, which are modified shoots rather than sporophylls.

Some plants do not produce sporophylls. Sporangia are produced directly on stems. Psilotum has been interpreted as producing sporangia (fused in a synangium) on the terminus of a stem. Equisetum always produce strobili, but the structures bearing sporangia (sporangiophores) have been interpreted as modified stems. The sporangia, despite being recurved are interpreted as terminal.

Gnetophytes produce both compound pollen and seed strobili.
