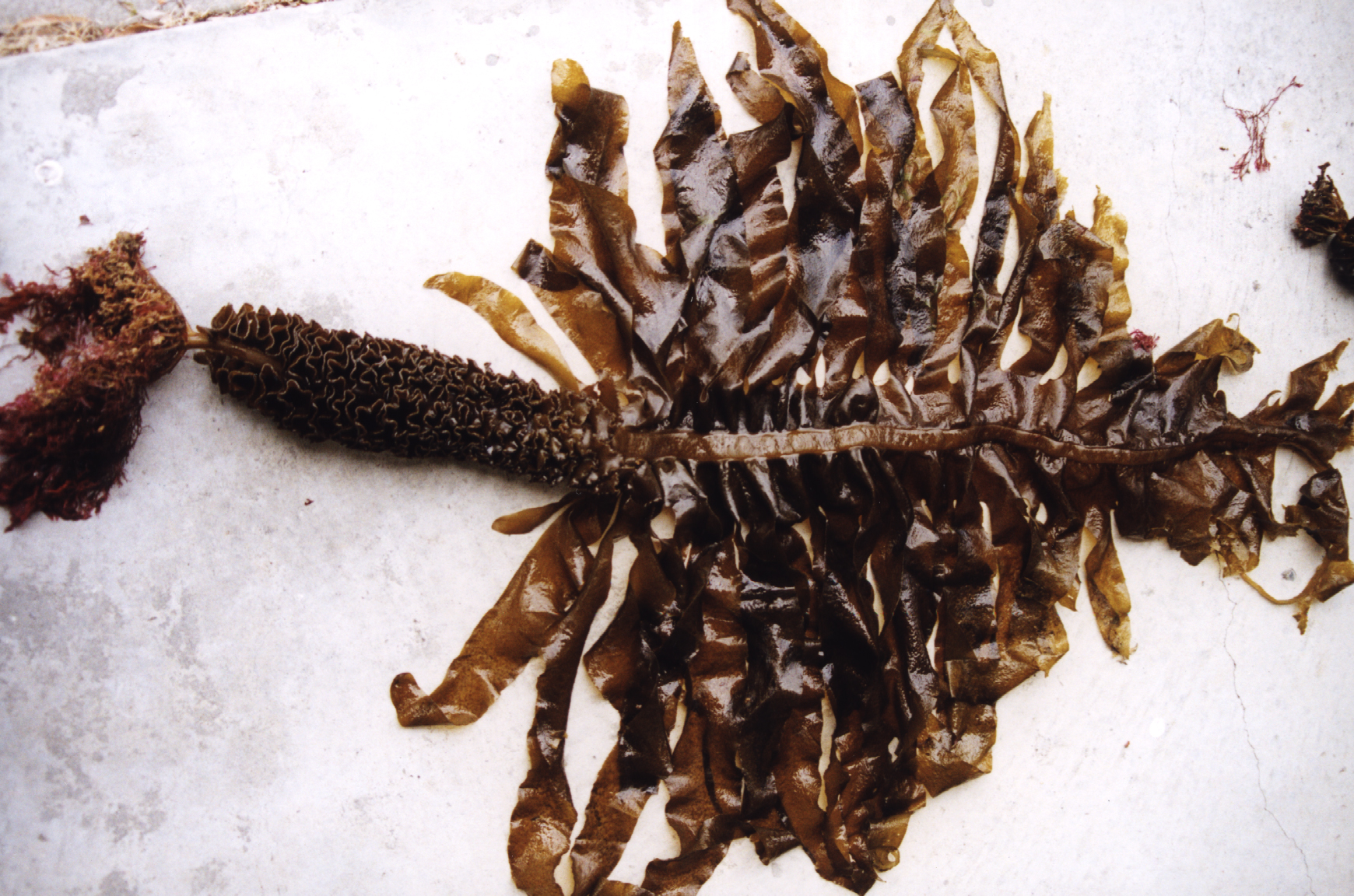
- mature sporophyte

Scientific classification
- Domain: Eukaryota
- Supergroup: Stramenopiles
- Division: Ochrophyta
- Class: Phaeophyceae
- Order: Laminariales
- Family: Alariaceae
- Genus: Undaria
- Species: U. pinnatifida

Binomial name
- Undaria pinnatifida (Harvey) Suringar, 1873

= Wakame =

Species of seaweed

Wakame, raw
Nutritional value per 100 g (3.5 oz)
- Energy: 188 kJ (45 kcal)
- Carbohydrates: 9.14 g
- Sugars: 0.65 g
- Dietary fiber: 0.5 g
- Fat: 0.64 g
- Protein: 3.03 g
Vitamins and minerals
| Vitamins | Quantity %DV^{†} |
| Thiamine (B1) | 5% 0.06 mg |
| Riboflavin (B2) | 18% 0.23 mg |
| Niacin (B3) | 10% 1.6 mg |
| Pantothenic acid (B5) | 14% 0.697 mg |
| Folate (B9) | 49% 196 μg |
| Vitamin C | 3% 3 mg |
| Vitamin E | 7% 1 mg |
| Vitamin K | 4% 5.3 μg |
| Minerals | Quantity %DV^{†} |
| Calcium | 12% 150 mg |
| Iron | 12% 2.18 mg |
| Magnesium | 25% 107 mg |
| Manganese | 61% 1.4 mg |
| Phosphorus | 6% 80 mg |
| Sodium | 38% 872 mg |
| Zinc | 3% 0.38 mg |
- Link to USDA Database entry
- ^{†}Percentages estimated using US recommendations for adults.

Wakame (Undaria pinnatifida) is a species of kelp native to cold, temperate coasts of the northwest Pacific Ocean. As an edible seaweed, it has a subtly sweet, but distinctive and strong flavour and satiny texture. It is most often served in soups and salads.

Wakame has long been collected for food in East Asia, and sea farmers in Japan have cultivated wakame since the eighth century (Nara period).

Although native to cold, temperate coastal areas of Japan, Korea, China, and Russia, it has established itself in temperate regions around the world, including New Zealand, the United States, Belgium, France, Great Britain, Spain, Italy, Argentina, Australia and Mexico. As of 2018, the Invasive Species Specialist Group has listed the species on its list of 100 worst globally invasive species.

Wakame, as with all other kelps and brown algae, is plant-like in appearance, but is unrelated to true plants, being, instead, a photosynthetic, multicellular stramenopile protist of the SAR supergroup.

== Names ==
The primary common name is derived from the Japanese name wakame (ワカメ, わかめ, 若布, 和布).

- In English, it can also be called sea mustard.
- In Chinese, it is called qúndài cài (裙带菜) or hǎidài yá (海帶芽).
- In French, it is called wakamé or fougère des mers ('sea fern').
- In Korean, it is called miyeok (미역).

== Etymology ==
In Old Japanese, me stood for edible seaweeds in general as opposed to mo standing for algae. In kanji, such as 海藻, 軍布 and 和布 were applied to transcribe the word. Among seaweeds, wakame was likely most often eaten, therefore me especially meant wakame. It expanded later to other seaweeds like kajime, hirome (kombu), arame, etc. Wakame is derived from waka + me (若布, lit. 'young seaweed'). If this waka is a eulogistic prefix, the same as the tama of tamagushi, wakame likely stood for seaweeds widely in ancient times. In the Man'yōshū, in addition to 和可米 and 稚海藻 (both are read as wakame), nigime (和海藻, soft wakame) can be seen. Besides, tamamo (玉藻, lit. 'beautiful algae'), which often appeared in the Man'yōshū, may be wakame depending on poems.

== History in the West ==
The earliest appearance in Western documents is probably in the Portuguese Nippo Jisho (1603), as Vacame.

In 1867 the word wakame appeared in an English-language publication, A Japanese and English Dictionary, by James C. Hepburn.

Starting in the 1960s, the word wakame started to be used widely in the United States, and the product (imported in dried form from Japan) became widely available at natural food stores and Asian-American grocery stores, due to the influence of the macrobiotic movement, and in the 1970s with the growing number of Japanese restaurants and sushi bars.

== Aquaculture ==
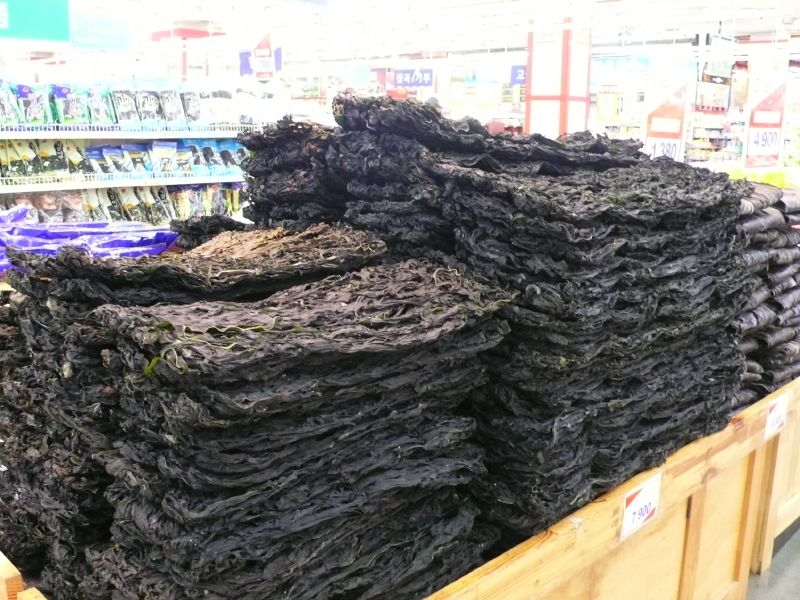
Dried miyeok (wakame) at a market in South Korea

Japanese and Korean sea-farmers have grown wakame for centuries, and are still both the leading producers and consumers. Wakame has also been cultivated in France since 1983, in sea fields established near the shores of Brittany.

Wild-grown wakame is harvested in Tasmania, Australia, and then sold in restaurants in Sydney and also sustainably hand-harvested from the waters of Foveaux Strait in Southland, New Zealand and freeze-dried for retail and use in a range of products.

== Cuisine ==
Wakame fronds are green and have a subtly sweet flavour and satiny texture. The leaves should be cut into small pieces as they will expand during cooking.

In Japan and Europe, wakame is distributed either dried or salted, and used in soups (particularly miso soup), and salads (tofu salad), or often simply as a side dish to tofu and a salad vegetable like cucumber. These dishes are typically dressed with soya sauce and vinegar, possibly rice vinegar.

Goma wakame, also known as seaweed salad, is a popular side dish at American and European sushi restaurants. Literally, it means "sesame seaweed", as sesame seeds are usually included in the recipe.

In Korea, wakame is used to make a seaweed soup called miyeok-guk, in which wakame is stir-fried in sesame oil and boiled with meat broth.

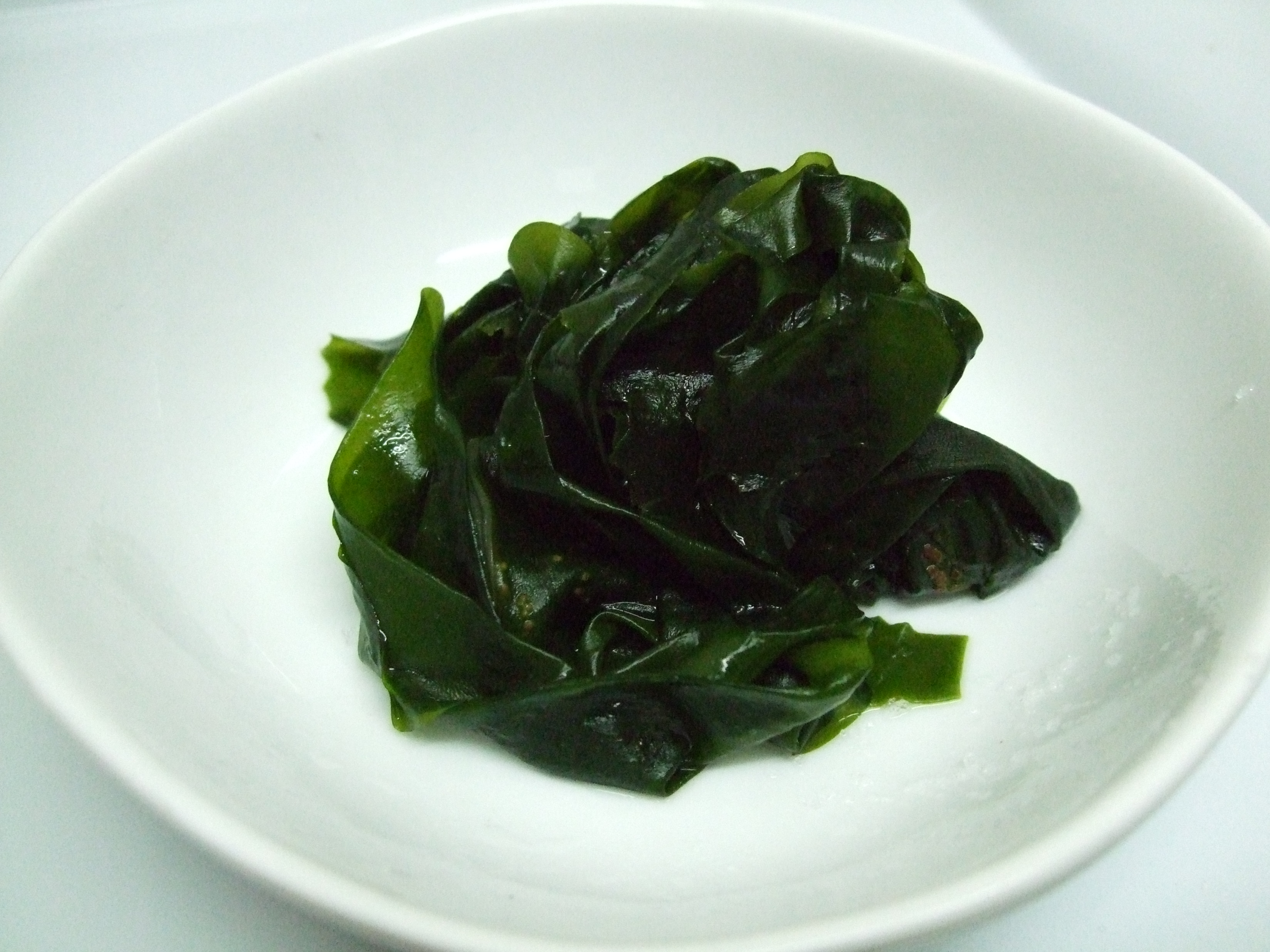
Plain boiled wakame

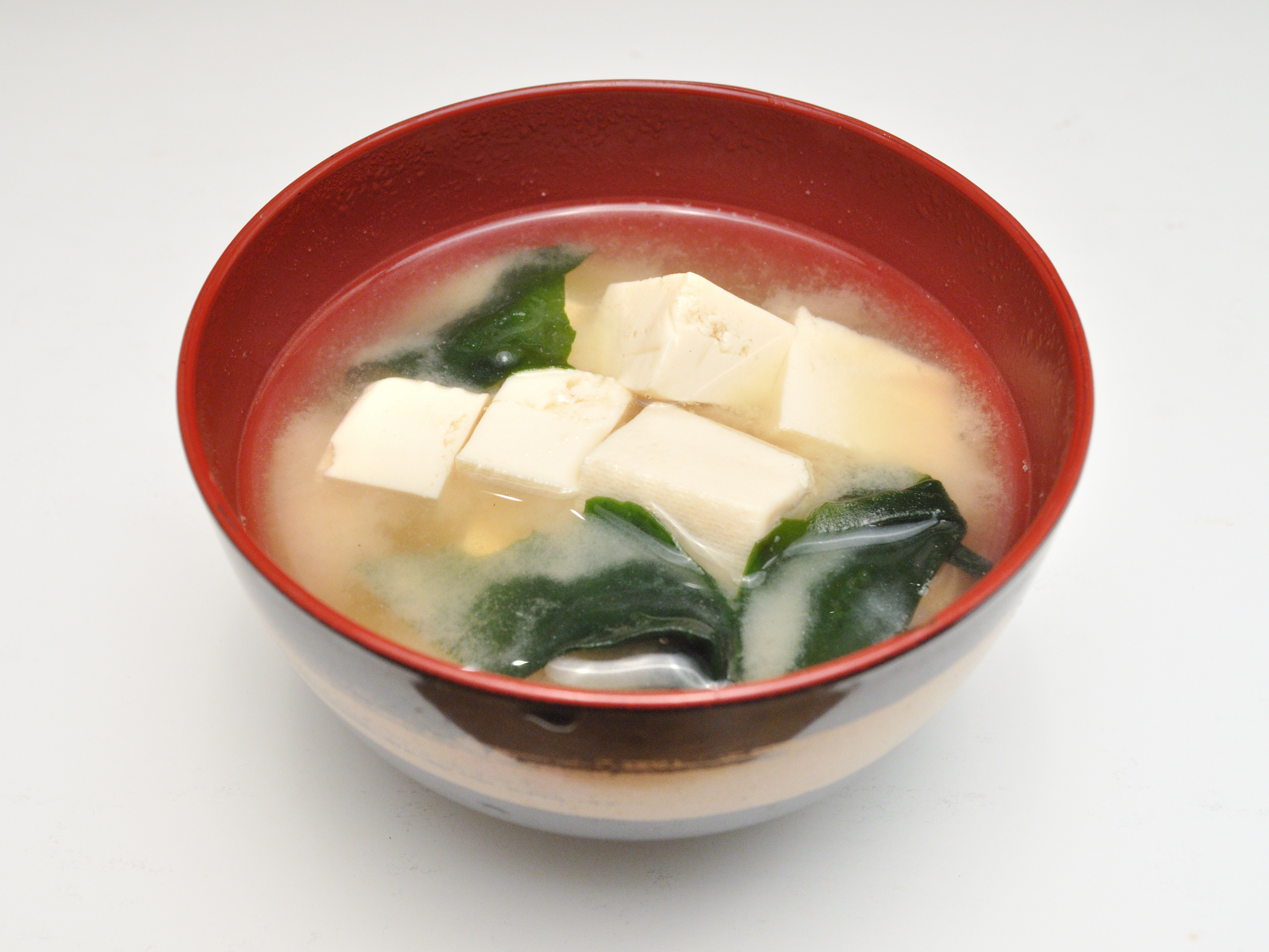
Japanese miso soup with wakame and tofu

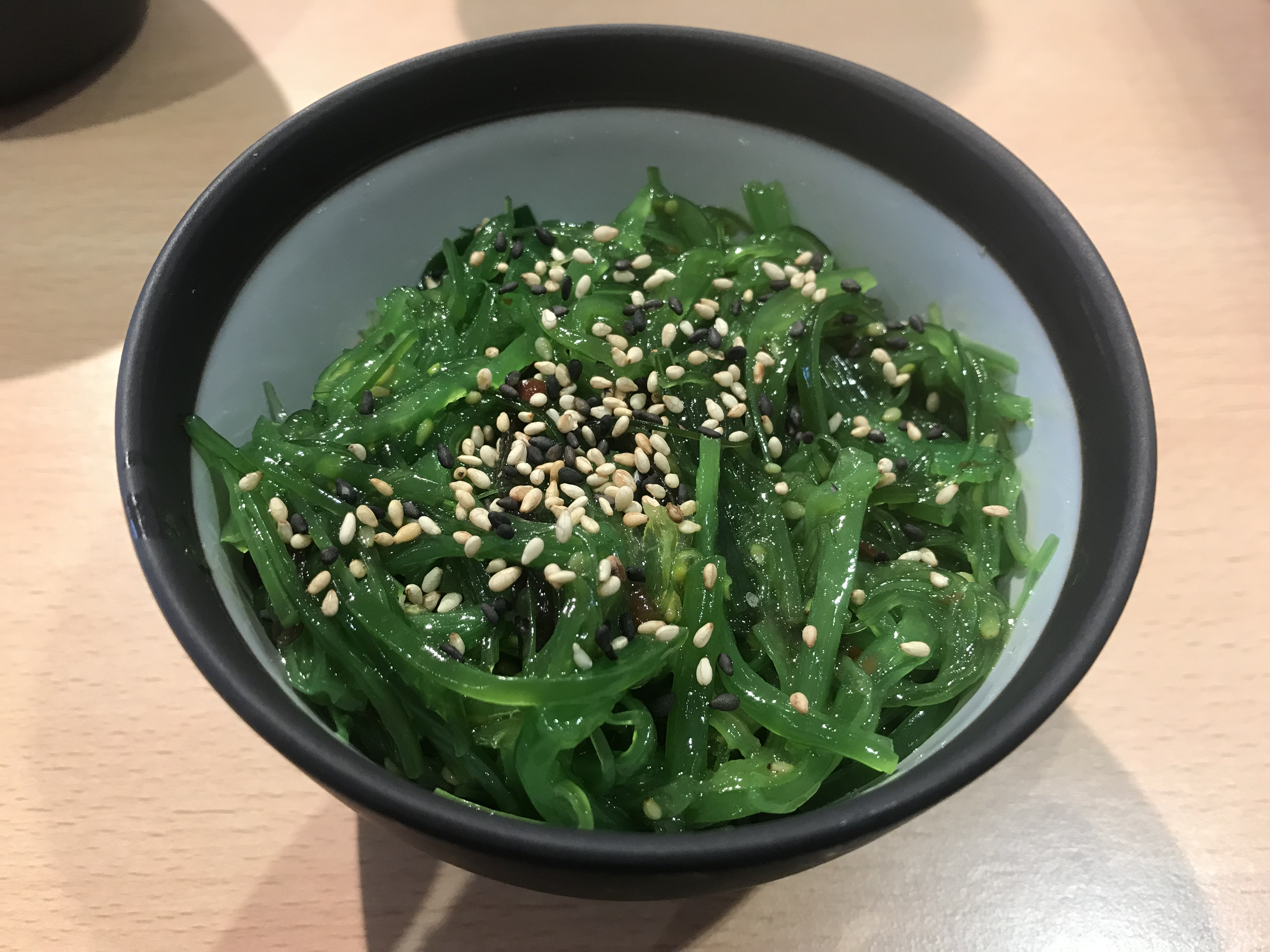
Japanese goma wakame (seaweed and sesame salad)

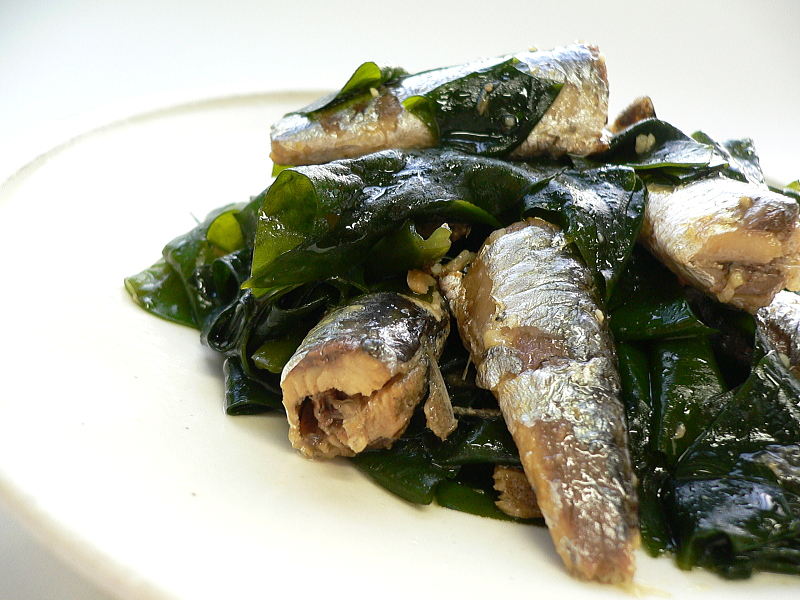
Japanese wakame with sardines

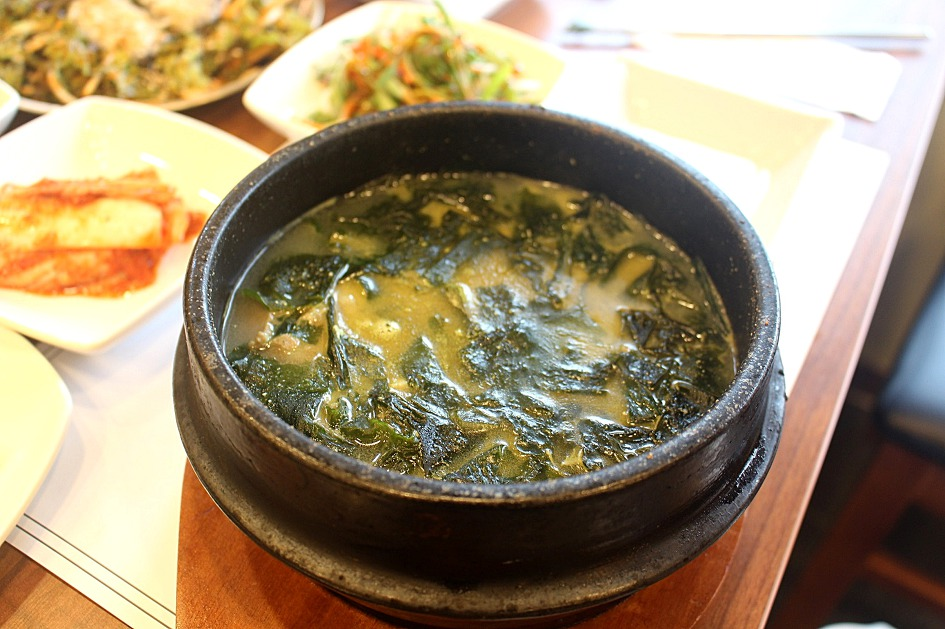
Korean miyeok-guk (seaweed soup)

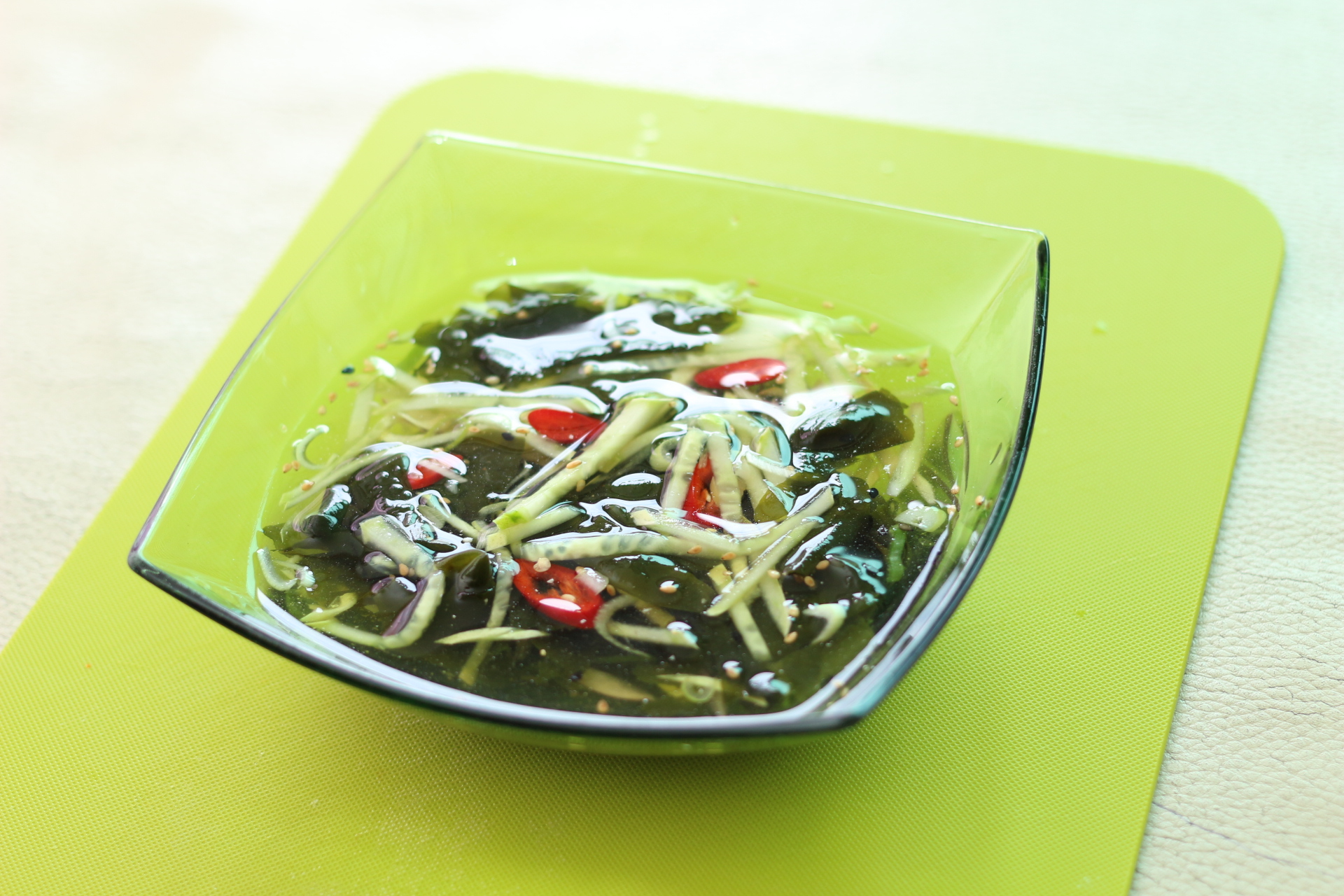
Korean miyeok naegguk (cold seaweed soup)

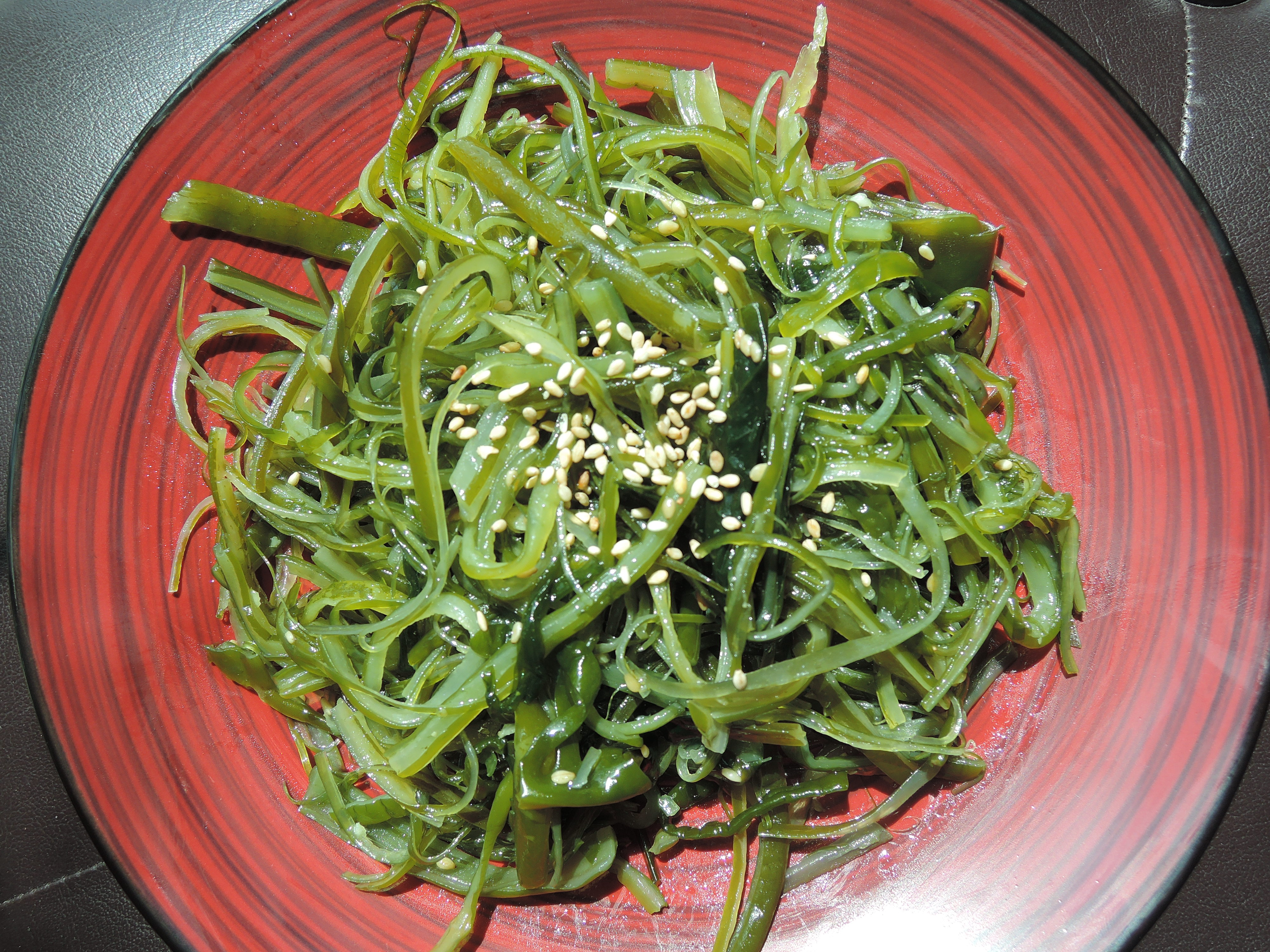
Korean miyeok julgibokkeum (stir-fried seaweed stems)

== Health effects ==
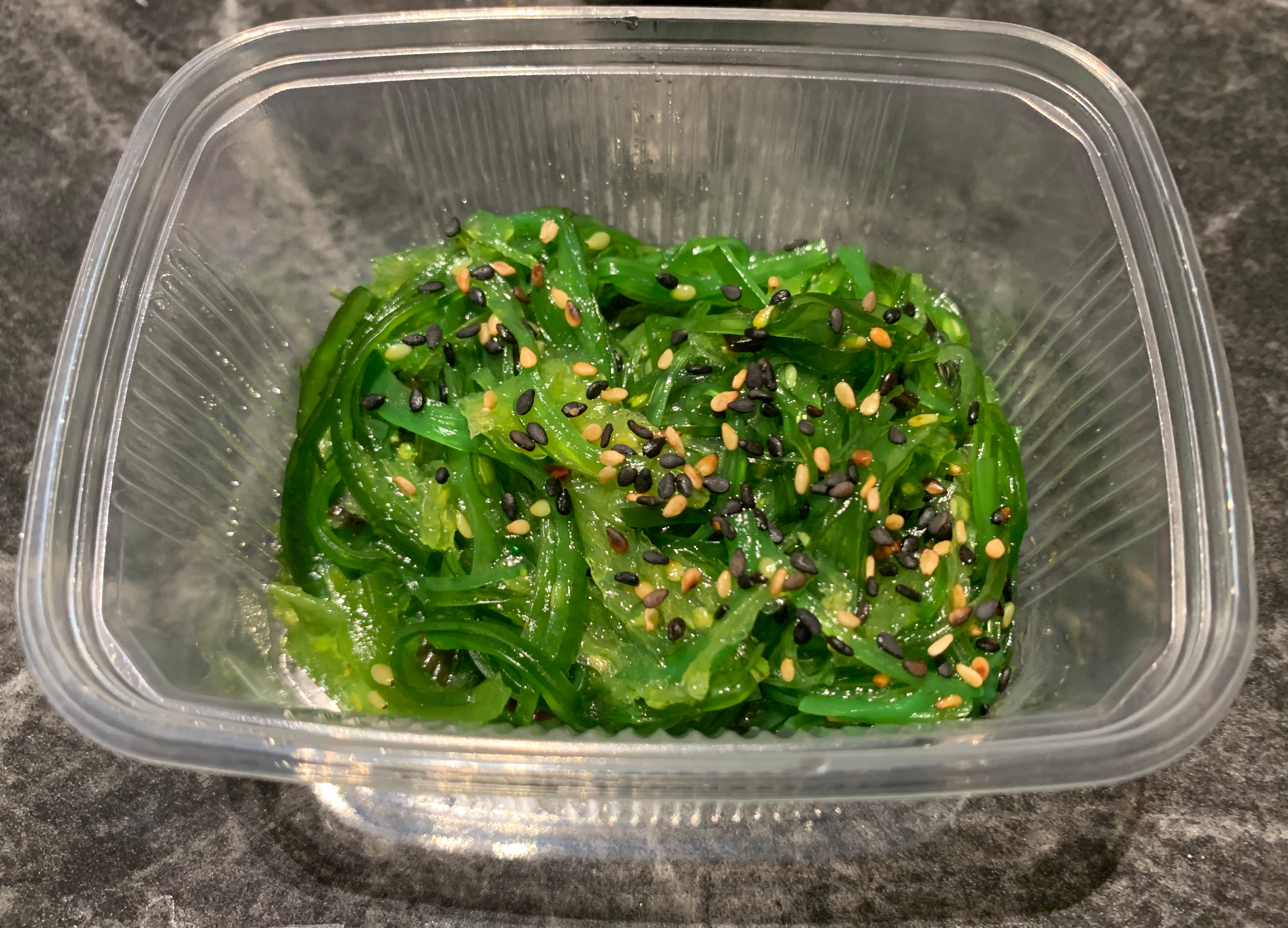
Wakame salad

A study conducted at Hokkaido University found that a compound in wakame known as fucoxanthin may help burn fatty tissue in mice and rats. Studies in mice have shown that fucoxanthin induces expression of the fat-burning protein UCP1 that accumulates in fat tissue around the internal organs. Expression of UCP1 protein was significantly increased in mice fed fucoxanthin. Wakame is also used in topical beauty treatments. See also Fucoidan.

Wakame is a rich source of eicosapentaenoic acid, an omega-3 fatty acid. At over 400 mg/(100 kcal) or almost 1 mg/kJ, it has one of the higher nutrient-to-energy ratios for this nutrient, and among the very highest for a vegetarian source. Wakame is a low calorie food. A typical 10–20 g (1–2 tablespoon) serving of wakame contains roughly 16 to 31 kJ (3.75 to 7.5 kcal) and provides 15–30 mg of omega-3 fatty acids. Wakame also has high levels of sodium, calcium, iodine, thiamine and niacin.

In Oriental medicine it has been used for blood purification, intestinal strength, skin, hair, reproductive organs and menstrual regularity.

In Korea, miyeok-guk soup is popularly consumed by women after giving birth as sea mustard (miyeok) contains a high content of calcium and iodine, nutrients that are important for new nursing mothers. Many women consume it during the pregnancy phase as well. It is also traditionally eaten on birthdays for this reason, a reminder of the first food that the mother has eaten and passed on to her newborn through her milk.

== Invasive species ==
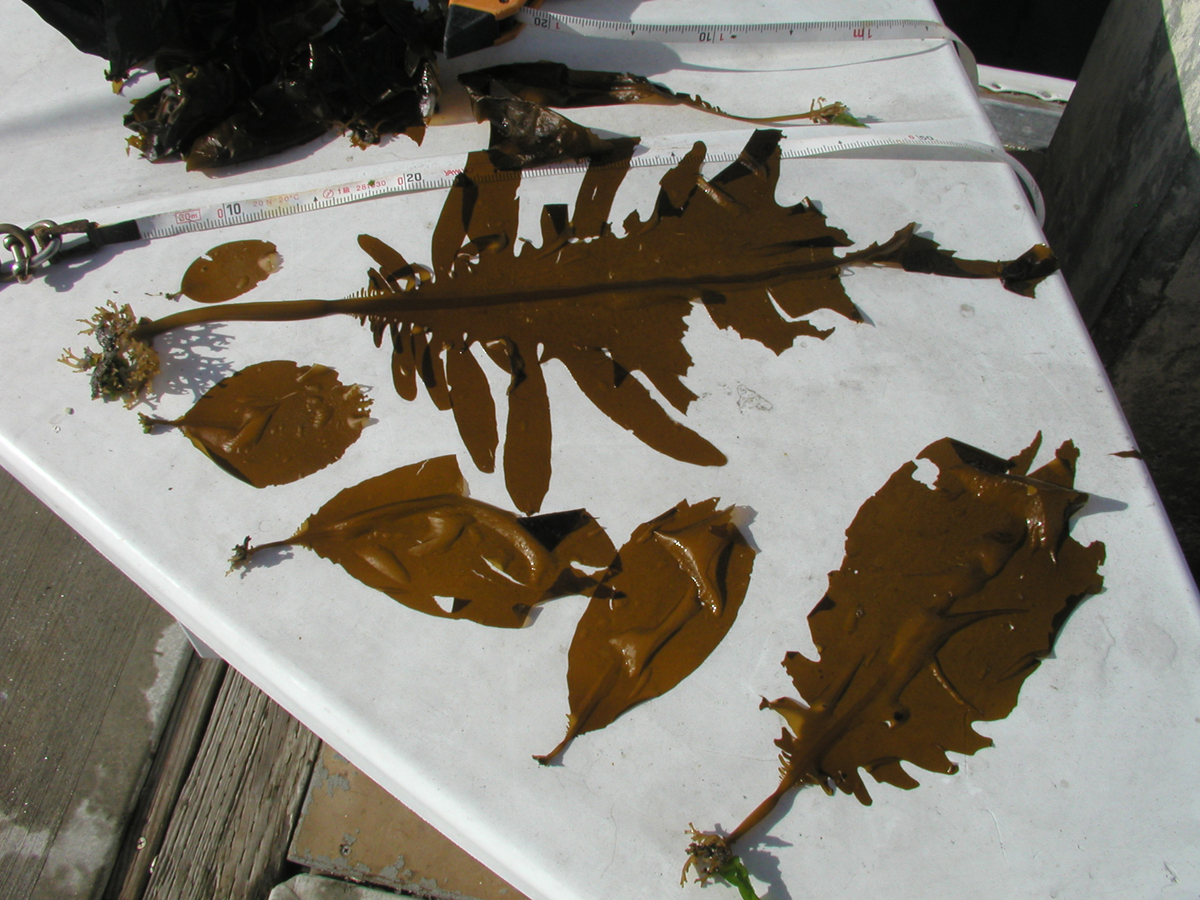
Undaria pinnatifida growth stages, from sprouts to young adults. Specimens from Monterey Harbor, California.

Native to cold temperate coastal areas of Japan, Korea, China, and Russia, in recent decades it has become established in temperate regions around the world, including New Zealand, the United States, Belgium, France, Great Britain, Spain, Italy, Argentina, Australia and Mexico. It was nominated one of the 100 worst invasive species in the world. Undaria is commonly initially introduced or recorded on artificial structures, where its r-selected growth strategy facilitates proliferation and spread to natural reef sites. Undaria populations make a significant but inconsistent contribution of food and habitat to intertidal and subtidal reefs. Undaria invasion can cause changes to native community composition at all trophic levels. As well as increasing primary productivity, it can reduce the abundance and diversity of understory algal assemblages, out-compete some native macroalgal species and affect the abundance and composition of associated epibionts and macrofauna, including gastropods, crabs, urchins and fish. Its dense congregation and capability to latch onto any hard surface has caused it to become a major cause of damage to aquaculture apparatus, decreasing efficiency of fishing industries by clogging underwater equipment and fouling boat hulls.

Eradication of wakame within a localized area usually involves getting rid of the algae underwater, often via regular inspection of aquatic environments. Removing the algae underwater without disrupting native flora is accomplished by humans diving underwater and manually removing the reproductive parts of the wakame to reduce its spread. Proper and regular cleaning of underwater apparatus reduces the potential vectors for wakame spores, reducing the spread of the seaweed.

=== New Zealand ===
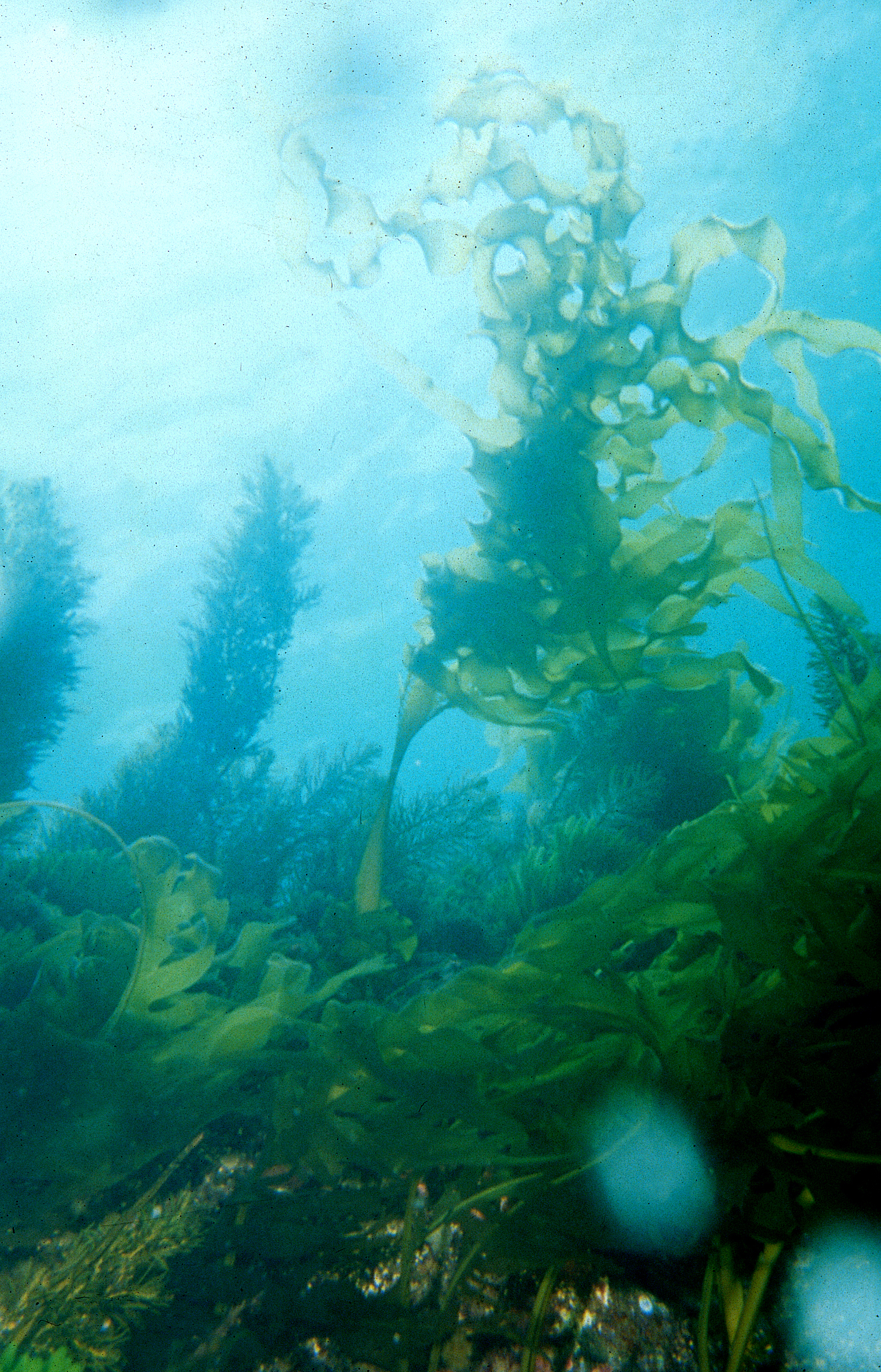
Wakame in the ocean

In New Zealand, Undaria pinnatifida was declared as an unwanted organism in 2000 under the Biosecurity Act 1993. It was first discovered in Wellington Harbour in 1987 and probably arrived as hull fouling on shipping or fishing vessels from Asia. In 2010, a single Undaria pinnatifida plant was discovered in Fiordland, which has since quickly spread from a small clump and localized itself throughout Fiordland.

Wakame is now found around much of New Zealand, from Stewart Island to as far north as the subtropical waters of Karikari Peninsula. It spreads in two ways: naturally, through the millions of microscopic spores released by each fertile organism, and through human mediated spread, most commonly via hull fouling and with marine farming equipment. It is a highly successful and fertile species, which makes it a serious invader. Its capability to grow in dense congregations on any hard surface allows it to outcompete native flora and fauna for sunlight and space. Although the effects of wakame in New Zealand are not fully understood, with the severity varying depending on the location, the negative impact of wakame is projected to be significant against the fishing and tourism industries in Fiordland, as well as overcrowding in popular diving locations.

Even though it is an invasive species, farming of wakame is permitted in already heavily infested areas of New Zealand, as part of a control program established since 2010. In 2012, the government allowed for the farming of wakame in Wellington, Marlborough and Banks Peninsula. Farmers of wakame must obtain permission from Biosecurity New Zealand to access approval of Sections 52 and 53 from the Biosecurity Act 1993, which deal with exceptions to the possession of pests and unwanted creatures. Furthermore, any farmed wakame must only be naturally settled in pre-existing marine farms; mussel farms are a commonly infested area for wakame. As an exceptional case of permitted farming purely as pest control, profitting from wakame is not permitted, with exception of Ngāi Tahu, in which the iwi's revenue from catching wakame is funded for further pest control.

=== United States ===
The seaweed has been found in several harbors in southern California. In May 2009 it was discovered in San Francisco Bay and aggressive efforts are underway to remove it before it spreads.

== See also ==
- Kelp
- Kombu
- Laverbread
- Miyeok guk
