= List of green seaweeds of the Cape Peninsula and False Bay =

Regional biodiversity species list

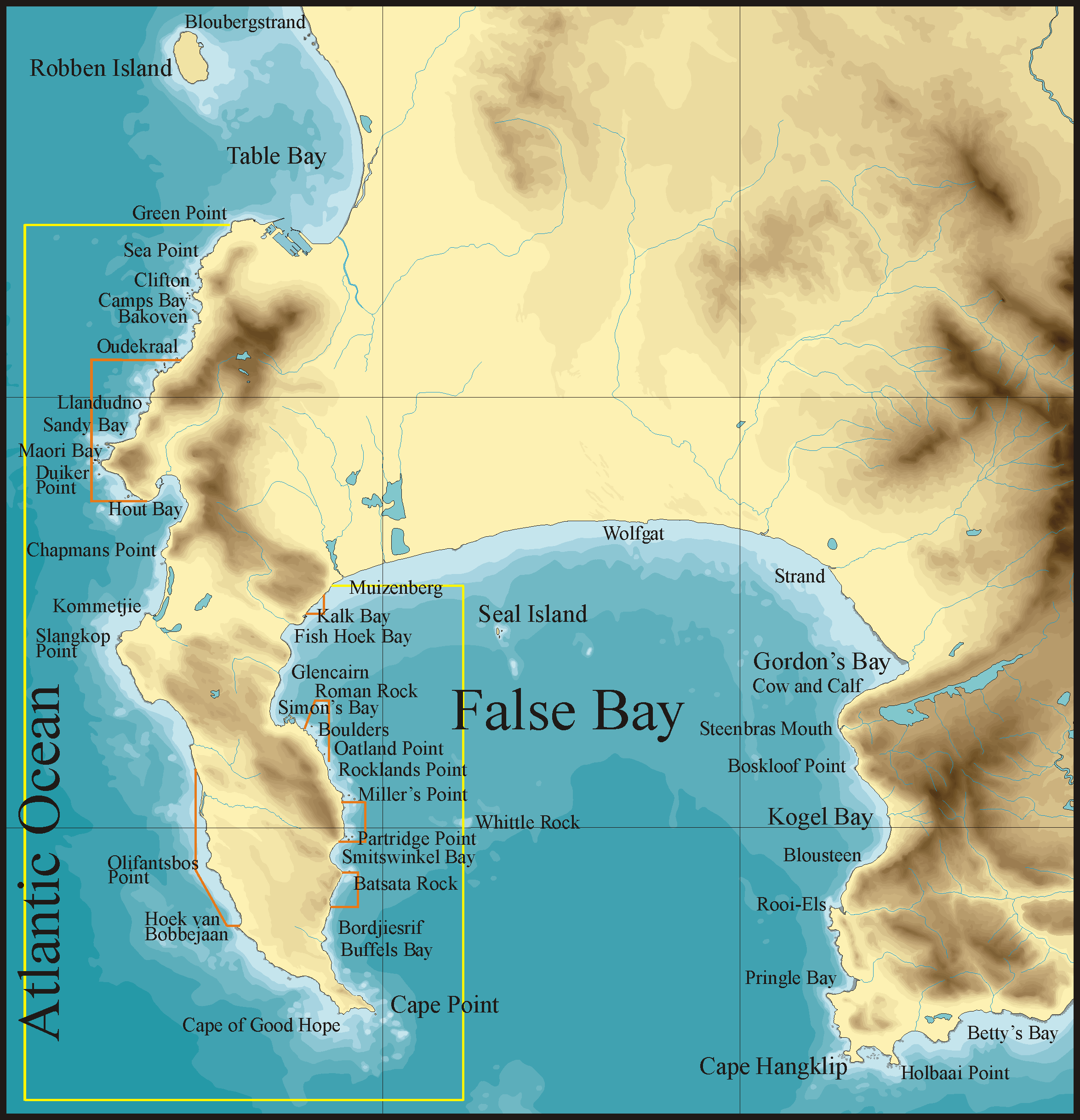
Map of the Cape Peninsula and False Bay coastline showing some of the landmarks referred to in species range statements. Melkbosstrand is a few kilometers north of the displayed area on the west coast. Cape Hangklip is shown on the map to the south east.

Marine ecoregions of the South African exclusive economic zone

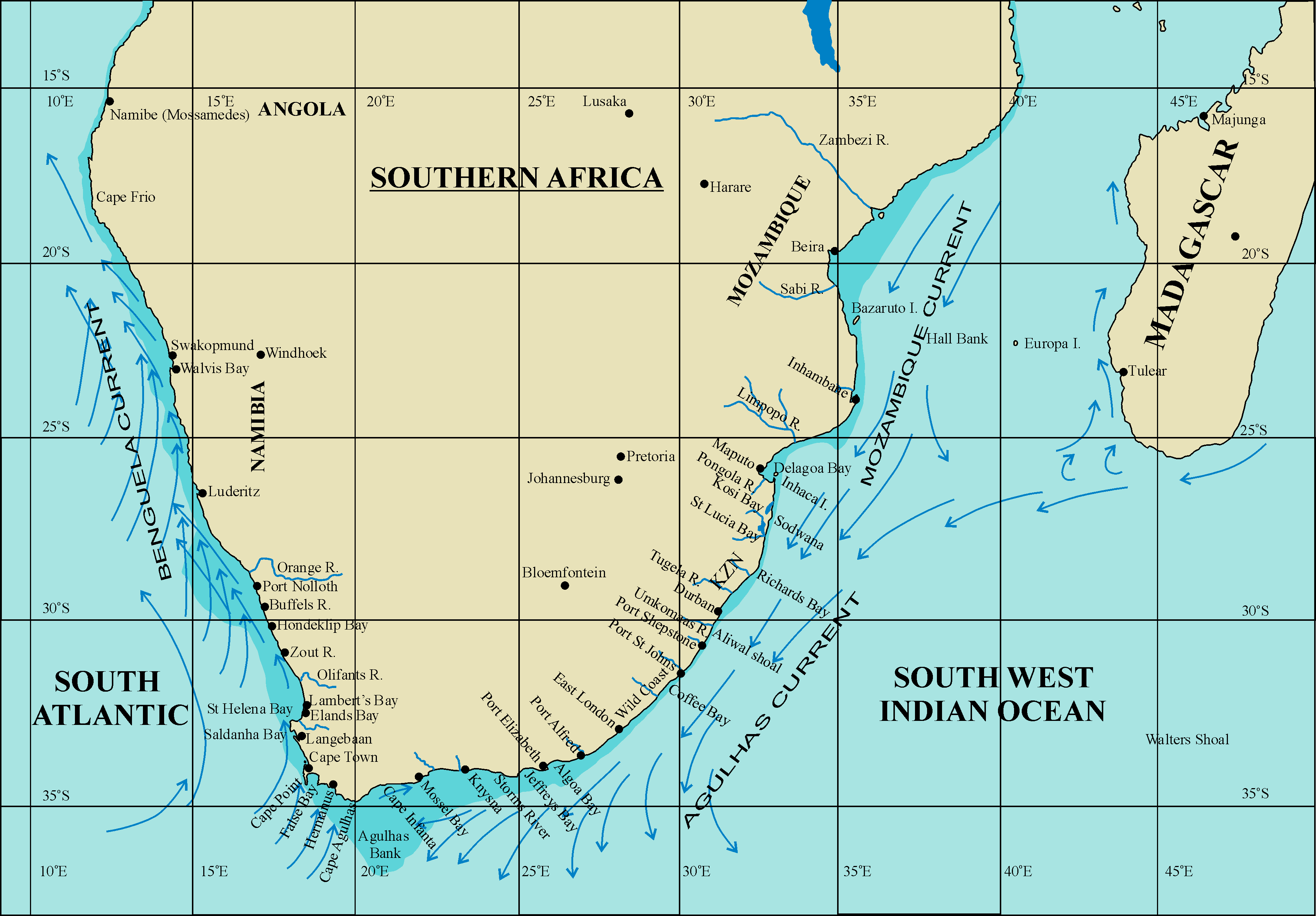
Map of the Southern African coastline showing some of the landmarks referred to in species range statements.

This is a list of green seaweeds recorded from the oceans bordering the Cape Peninsula in South Africa from Melkbosstrand on the West Coast to Cape Hangklip on the South Coast. This list comprises locally used common names, scientific names with author citation and recorded ranges. Ranges specified may not be the entire known range for the species, but should include the known range within the waters surrounding the Republic of South Africa.

Green seaweed refers to thousands of species of macroscopic, multicellular, marine algae in the taxon Chlorophyta

The marine ecology is unusually varied for an area of this size, as a result of the meeting of two major oceanic water masses near Cape Point, and the area extends into two coastal marine bioregions. The ecology of the west or "Atlantic Seaboard" side of the Cape Peninsula is noticeably different in character and biodiversity to that of the east, or "False Bay" side. Both sides are classified as temperate waters, but there is a significant difference in average temperature, with the Atlantic side being noticeably colder on average.

List ordering and taxonomy complies where possible with the current usage in Algaebase, and may differ from the cited source, as listed citations are primarily for range or existence of records for the region. Sub-taxa within any given taxon are arranged alphabetically as a general rule. Details of each species may be available through the relevant internal links. Synonyms may be listed where useful.

== Class: Bryopsidophyceae ==
=== Order: Bryopsidales ===
==== Family: Bryopsidaceae ====
- Bryopsis africana Areschoug, 1851, (Probably along the whole of the west Cape coast)
- Bryopsis eckloniae Stegenga, Bolton & Anderson 1997, (Muizenberg, endemic)
- Bryopsis hypnoides Lamouroux, 1809c, (False Bay)
- Sea moss, Bryopsis myosuroides Kützing, 1856, (TMNPMPA).
- Bryopsis plumosa (Hudson 1778) C. Agardh 1823, l syn. Ulva plumosa Hudson 1778, (False Bay and eastward)

==== Family: Caulerpaceae ====
- Caulerpa bartoniae G. Murray, 1896, (Rare in Western Cape, Cape Hangklip and Muizenberg. Mainly from south coast. endemic)
- Strap caulerpa Caulerpa filiformis (Suhr) Hering 1841, syn.Amphibolis filiformis Suhr 1834, Himandactylius filiformis (Suhr) Trevisan 1849, (False Bay to northern KwaZulu-Natal)
- Feathery caulerpa Caulerpa holmesiana G. Murray, 1891, (Mainly a south coast species. the westernmost records at Cape of Good Hope, endemic)

==== Family: Codiaceae ====
- Duthie's upright codium Codium duthieae Silva in Silva & Womersley, 1956, (Mainly a south and east coast species, westwards as far as Langebaan lagoon.)(From Namibia along the entire South African coast)
- Fragile upright codium Codium fragile subsp. fragile (Suringar) Hariot 1889, syn Codium fragile (Suringar) Hariot subsp. capense Silva 1959a, Acanthocodium fragile Suringar 1867, (Whole of Cape west coast and most of Namibia, Eastward as far as Robberg, Plettenberg Bay)
- Codium isaacii Silva, 1959a, (Namibia to Cape Peninsula, endemic)
- Lucas' codium Codium lucasii Setchell subsp. capense Silva 1959a, (Strand, False Bay to southern Mozambique)
- Codium papenfussii Silva, 1959a, (West coast of Cape Peninsula to southern KwaZulu-Natal, single specimen from Sodwana Bay, endemic)
- Flat-lobed codium Codium platylobium Areschoug 1854, (False Bay to mouth of Mtwalume river in KwaZulu-Natal)
- Stephens' codium Codium stephensiae Dickinson 1932, (St Helena Bay to Transkei, endemic)

==== Family: Derbesiaceae ====
- Derbesia hollenbergii Taylor 1945, (Muizenberg and Strandfontein, False Bay, and Eastern Cape and Transkei)
- Derbesia marina (Lyngbye) Solier 1846, syn. Vaucheria marina Lyngbye 1819, (Muizenberg, False Bay, and Eastern Cape and Transkei)

==== Family: Udoteaceae ====
- Chlorodesmis sp. indet (Oudekraal, Cape Peninsula, endemic)

== Class: Chlorophyceae ==
=== Order: Chaetophorales ===
==== Family: Chaetophoraceae ====
- Acrochaete sp. indet (Glencairn (False Bay) and De Hoop Nature Reserve)

==== Family: Chroolepidaceae ====
- Sporocladopsis novae-zelandiae Chapman, 1949 (Yzerfonten to East London)

== Class: Charophyceae ==
=== Order: Charales ===
==== Family: Characeae ====
- Foxtail stonewart, Lamprothamnium papulosum (K.Wallroth) J.Groves, 1916 (TMNPMPA)

== Class: Ulvophyceae ==
=== Order: Cladophorales ===
==== Family: Cladophoraceae ====
- Chaetomorpha aerea (Dillwyn) Kützing 1849, syn. Conferva aerea Dillwyn 1806, Chloronitum aerea (Dillwyn) Gaillon 1828, (False Bay to Cape Agulhas)
- Hair weed Chaetomorpha linum (O.F.Müller) Kützing 1845, syn. Conferva linum O.F.Müller 1778, Lychaete linum (O.F.Müller) Areschoug 1851, (Kalk Bay and Simon's Town harbours)
- Robust hair-weed Chaetomorpha robusta (Areschoug) Papenfuss 1940, syn. Lychaete robusta Areschoug 1851, (Namibia to Hermanus)
- Chaetomorpha sp. indet, (Clovelly, False Bay)
- Cape cladophora Cladophora capensis (C.Agardh) De Toni 1889, syn. Conferva capensis C.Agardh 1824, (Namibia to southern Cape Peninsula)
- Turf cladophora Cladophora contexta Levring 1938, (Olifantsbos to Lüderitz)
- Cladophora dalmatica Kuetzing 1843, (Glencairn, False Bay)
- Blue whip cladophora Cladophora flagelliformis (Suhr) Kützing 1849, syn. Conferva flagelliformis Suhr 1840, Lychaete flagelliformis (Suhr) Areschoug 1851, (Brandfontein to Namibia)
- Cladophora isaacii Simons 1960, (Port Nolloth to Cape Hangklip)
- Cladophora mirabilis (C.Agardh) Rabenhorst in Hohenacker 1852, syn. Conferva mirabilis C.Agardh 1820, (Cape Hangklip to Cape Fria, Namibia)
- Cladophora radiosa (Suhr) Kützing 1889, syn. Conferva radiosa Suhr 1834, (Table Bay eastwards to Cape Morgan)
- Cladophora sericia (Hudson) Kützing 1843, syn. Conferva sericea Hudson 1762, Chloronitum sericeum (Hudson) Gallion 1928, (Cape Peninsula north to Melkbosstrand, east to De Hoop nature reserve)
- Cladophora sp. indet. (Clovelly to Buffels Bay, Cape Peninsula)
- Rhizoclonium implexum (Dillwyn) Kützing 1845, SYN. Conferva implexa Dillwyn 1809, Rhizoclonium riparium var. implexum (Dillwyn) Rosenvinge 1893, (Kraalbaai, Langebaan lagoon and Clovelly, Cape Peninsula)

=== Order: Ulotrichales ===
==== Family: Ulotrichaceae ====
- Ulothrix flacca (Dillwyn) Thuret in Le Jolis 1863, syn. Conferva flacca Dillwyn 1805, Lyngbya flacca (Dillwyn) Harvey 1849, (Cape Peninsula and False Bay)
- Ulothrix speciosa (Carmichael) Kützing 1849, syn Ulothrix zonata var. speciosa (Carmichael) Stockmayer, Lyngbya speciosa Carmichael 1833, Hormotrichum speciosum (Carmichael) P.L.Crouan & H.M.Crouan 1852, Urospora speciosa (Carmichael) Leblond ex G.Hamel 1931, (Known from a single collection at Kalk Bay)

=== Order: Ulvales ===
==== Family: Ulvaceae ====
- Blidingia minima (Nägeli ex Kützing) Kylin 1947, syn. Enteromorpha minima Nägeli ex Kützing 1849, Enteromorpha compressa var. minima (Nägeli ex Hauck) Hamel 1931, Enteromorpha nana var. minima (Nägeli ex Hauck) Sjøstedt 1939, (Kraalbaai, Langebaan lagoon to False Bay, and Eastern Cape)
- Chloropelta caespitosa Tanner 1980, (Kalk Bay and Cape Hangklip)
- Enteromorpha atroviridis (Levring) M.J.Wynne 1986, syn. Ulva atroviridis Levring 1938, (Namibia to Oudekraal, Cape Peninsula)
- Percursaria percursa (C.Agardh) Rosenvinge 1893, syn. Zignoa percursa (C.Agardh) Trevisan, Conferva percursa C.Agardh 1817, Enteromorpha percursa (C.Agardh) J.Agardh 1842, (Cape Peninsula – Glencairn, Scarborough, Mouille Point)
- Tangleweed, Ulva clathrata (Roth) C.Agardh, 1811, (TMNPMPA),
- Ulva flexuosa Wulfen 1803, syn. Enteromorpha flexuosa (Wulfen) J.Agardh 1883, (Muizenberg and Dalebrook, False Bay and Eastern Cape)
- Green sea intestines, Ulva intestinalis Linnaeus 1753, syn. Conferva intestinalis (Linnaeus) Roth 1797, Tetraspora intestinalis (Linnaeus) Desvaux 1818, Scytosiphon intestinalis (Linnaeus) Lyngbye 1819, Enteromorpha intestinalis (Linnaeus) Nees 1820, Fistularia intestinalis (Linnaeus) Greville 1824, Solenia intestinalis (Linnaeus) C.Agardh 1824, Ilea intestinalis (Linnaeus) Leiblein 1827, Hydrosolen intestinalis (Linnaeus) Martius 1833, Ulva enteromorpha var. intestinalis (Linnaeus) Le Jolis 1863, Ulva bulbosa var. intestinalis (Linnaeus) Hariot 1889, Enteromorpha compressa var. intestinalis (Linnaeus) Hamel 1931, (Widespread on west and south coasts, along entire South African coast)
- Ulva lactuca Linnaeus 1753, syn. Phyllona lactuca (Linnaeus) F.H.Wiggers 1780, Ulva fasciata Delile 1813, (Saldanha Bay, False Bay eastwards into Mozambique)
- Ulva linza Linnaeus 1753, syn. Solenia linza (Linnaeus) C.Agardh 1824, Enteronia linza (Linnaeus) Chevallier 1836, Phycoseris linza (Linnaeus) Kützing 1843, Enteromorpha linza (Linnaeus) J.Agardh 1883, (Namibia to False Bay)
- Ulva prolifera O.F.Müller 1778, syn. Ulva enteromorpha f. prolifera (O.F.Müller) Van Heurck, Ulva compressa var. prolifera (O.F.Müller) C.Agardh 1823, Enteromorpha compressa var. prolifera (O.F.Müller) Greville 1830, Enteromorpha prolifera (O.F.Müller) J.Agardh 1883, (Namibia to Eastern Cape)
- Ulva rhacodes (Holmes) Papenfuss 1960, syn. Enteromorpha rhacodes Holmes 1894, (False Bay to Eastern Cape)
- Rigid sea lettuce Ulva rigida C.Agardh 1823, syn. Phycoseris rigida (C.Agardh) Kützing 1843, Ulva lactuca var. rigida (C.Agardh) Le Jolis 1863, (Cape Peninsula to tropical East Africa)
- Ulva uncialis (Kützing) Montagne 1850, syn. Phycoseris uncialis Kützing 1849, Ulva capensis Areschoug 1851, (Namibia to Cape Agulhas)

== Geographical position of places mentioned in species ranges ==
- Algoa Bay, Eastern Cape, 33°55′S 25°42′E
- Aliwal shoal, KwaZulu-Natal, 30°15′30″S 30°49′30″E
- Arniston (Waenhuiskrans), Western Cape, 34°40′S 20°14′E
- Betty's Bay, Western Cape, 34°22′S 18°56′E
- Bhanga Neck, KwaZulu-Natal, 27°01′00″S 32°50′00″E
- Bird Island, Eastern Cape, 33°50′28″S 26°17′10″E
- Blaauwberg, Western Cape, 33°48′S 18°27′E
- Black Rock, Northern KwaZulu-Natal, 27°08′00″S 32°50′00″E
- Brandfontein, Western Cape, 34°46′S 19°52′E
- Buffelsbaai (Cape Peninsula), Western Cape, 34°19′10″S 18°27′41″E
- Buffelsbaai (west coast), Western Cape, 33°35′S 18°21′E
- Buffelsbaai (south coast), Western Cape, 34°05′S 22°58′E
- Cape Agulhas, Western Cape, 34°50′00″S 20°00′09″E
- Cape Columbine, Western Cape, 32°49′39″S 17°51′23″E
- Cape Frio, Namibia, 18°26′12″S 12°00′17″E
- Cape of Good Hope, Western Cape, 34°21′29″S 018°28′19″E (sometimes used historically to refer to the Cape Province, or South Africa)
- Cape Peninsula, Western Cape 34°12′S 18°24′E
- Cape Hangklip, Western Cape, 34°23′17″S 018°49′35″E
- Cape Infanta, Western Cape, 34°25′S 20°51′E
- Clovelly, False Bay, Western Cape, 34°09′29″S 18°26′11″E
- Dalebrook, False Bay, Western Cape, 34°07′29″S 18°27′11″E
- Danger Point, Western Cape, 34°37′55″S 19°17′34″E
- De Hoop, Western Cape, (just west of Cape Infanta) 32°26′03″S 20°32′52″E
- De Walle, (Die Walle), (Just west of Agulhas)
- Die Dam (Quoin Point), Western Cape, 34°46′S 19°41′E
- Doring Bay (Doringbaai), Western Cape, 31°49′S 18°14′E
- Durban, KwaZulu-Natal, 29°51′S 31°01′E
- Dwesa, Eastern Cape, 32°15′36″S 28°53′42″E
- East London, Eastern Cape, 32°59′S 027°52′E
- False Bay, Western Cape, 34°14′S 18°39′E
- Glencairn, False Bay, Western Cape, 34°09′50″S 18°26′00″E
- Groenrivier (Groen River), 30°50′55″S 17°34′20″E
- Groot Bergrivier estuary (Berg River, Velddrif), Western Cape, 32°47′S 18°10′E
- Haga Haga, Eastern Cape (N of E.London) 32°46′S 28°15′E
- The Haven, Eastern Cape, 150 km west of Port St. Johns, 32°14′50″S 28°55′15″E
- Hermanus, Western Cape, 34°25′S 19°14′E
- Hluleka, Eastern Cape, 31°49′S 29°18′E
- Hondeklipbaai, Northern Cape, 30°19′S 17°16′E
- Hout Bay, Cape Peninsula, Western Cape, 34°03′30″S 18°21′20″E
- Isipingo, KwaZulu-Natal, 29°59′50″S 30°57′20″E
- Island Rock, KwaZulu-Natal, 27°17′00″S 32°46′00″E
- Kalk Bay, False Bay, Western Cape, 34°07′40″S 18°27′00″E
- Kei River, Eastern Cape, 32°40′35″S 28°23′10″E
- Kenton-on-Sea, Eastern Cape, 33°42′S 26°41′E
- Keurboomstrand, Plettenberg Bay, Western Cape, 34°02′17″S 23°23′31″E
- Knysna, Western Cape, 34°05′02″S 23°03′37″E
- Kommetjie, Western Cape, 34°08′S 18°19′E
- Koppie Alleen, De Hoop, Western Cape,
- Kosi Bay, Kwa-Zulu-Natal, 26°54′06″S 32°51′59″E
- Kowie River, Eastern Cape, 33°36′15″S 26°54′12″E
- Kraalbaai, Langebaan lagoon, Western Cape, 33°08′30″S 18°01′45″E
- Lala Nek, KwaZulu-Natal, 27°13′00″S 32°48′00″E
- Lamberts Bay, Western Cape, 32°05′24″S 18°18′10″E
- Leadsman shoal, KwaZulu-Natal, 28°23′00″S 32°25′15″E
- Langebaan Lagoon, Western Cape, 33°09′S 18°04′E
- Llandudno, Cape Peninsula, Western Cape, 34°00′30″S 18°20′20″E
- Lüderitz, Namibia, 26°38′53″S 15°9′34″E
- Mabibi, Kwa-Zulu-Natal, 29°20′10″S 32°45′10″E
- Mapelane, Maphelana, KwaZulu-Natal, near St. Lucia, 28°24′28″S 32°25′44″E
- Melkbosstrand, Western Cape, 33°43′38″S 18°26′06″E
- Mission Rocks, KwaZulu-Natal, 28°16′23″S 32°29′55″E
- Mkambati, KwaZulu-Natal, 31°17′S 29°57′E
- Morgan's Bay, Eastern Cape, (Near Kei mouth) 32°42′0″S 28°21′0″E
- Möwe Bay, Namibia, 19°22′48″S 12°42′29″E(Möwe Point lighthouse)
- Mtwalume river, KwaZulu-Natal,
- Noordhoek, Cape Peninsula, Western Cape, 34°07′S 18°21′E
- Muizenberg, False Bay, Western Cape, 34°07′S 018°28′E
- Oatlands Point, False Bay, Western Cape, 34°12′30″S 18°27′44″E
- Oudekraal, Cape Peninsula, Western Cape, 33°59′09″S 18°20′55″E
- Olifantsbos, Cape Peninsula, Western Cape, 34°16′23″S 18°22′45″E
- Palm Beach, South Africa, 30°59′S 30°16′E
- Park Rynie, KwaZulu-Natal, 30°19′S 30°44′E
- Paternoster, Western Cape, 32°49′S 17°53′E
- Papenkuilsfontein, Western Cape, 10 km west of Agulhas
- Pearly Beach, Western Cape, 34°39′S 19°29′E
- Platbank, Cape Peninsula, Western Cape, °'"S °'E34°20′5″S 18°29′09″E
- Platboombaai, 34°20′20″S 18°27′08″E
- Plettenberg Bay, Western Cape, 34°03′S 023°22′E
- Ponta do Ouro, Mozambique border, 26°50′36″S 32°53′48″E
- Port Alfred, Eastern Cape, 33°36′15″S 26°54′12″E
- Port Edward, KwaZulu-Natal 31°03′S 30°13′E
- Port Elizabeth, Eastern Cape, 33°58′S 25°35′E
- Port Nolloth, Northern Cape, 22°15′S 16°52′E
- Port St. Johns, KwaZulu-Natal, 31°37′40″S 29°33′20″E
- Postberg, Western Cape, 33°07′S 18°00′E
- Protea Banks, KwaZulu-Natal, 30°50′S 30°28′E
- Rabbit Rock, KwaZulu-Natal,
- Robberg, Western Cape, 34°06′30″S 23°24′45″E
- Rocky Point, Namibia,
- Saldanha Bay, Western Cape, 33°01′S 17°59′E
- Saxon Reef, KwaZulu-Natal, (near Mozambique border),
- Scarborough, Cape Peninsula, Western Cape, 34°12′00″S 18°22′13″E
- Scottburgh, KwaZulu-Natal, 30°17′S 30°45′E
- Sea Point, Cape Peninsula, Western Cape, 33°55′19″S 18°22′37″E
- Shelly Beach, KwaZulu-Natal, KwaZulu-Natal, 30°48′S 30°25′E
- Simon's Town, Western Cape, 34°11′S 18°26′E
- Smitswinkel Bay, False Bay, Western Cape, 34°16′S 18°28′E
- Sodwana Bay, KwaZulu-Natal, 27°32′S 32°41′E
- Soetwater,
- Stilbaai (Still Bay), Western Cape, E34°22′S 21°25′E
- St Helena Bay, Western Cape, 32°43′S 18°06′E
- St. James, False Bay, Western Cape, 34°07′29″S 18°27′11″E
- St Lucia, KwaZulu-Natal, 28°23′03″S 32°25′46″E
- Strand, Western Cape, 34°07′S 18°49′E
- Strandfontein, False Bay, Western Cape, 34°05′22″S 18°33′18″E
- Strandfontein, Western Cape, 31°45′20″S 18°13′38″E
- Swakopmund, Namibia, 22°41′S 14°32′E
- Swartklip, False Bay, Western Cape, 34°04′30″S 18°41′10″E
- Swartkops River, 33°51′56″S 25°37′58″E
- Table Bay, Western Cape, 33°53′S 18°27′E
- Three Anchor Bay, Cape Peninsula, Western Cape, 33°54′22″S 19°23′51″E
- Three Sisters (Eastern Cape), Riet River, 10 km west of Port Alfred, Eastern Cape,
- Trafalgar, KwaZulu-Natal, 30°58′S 30°18′E
- Tsitsikamma, Eastern Cape, 34°01′18″S 22°53′44″E
- Umhlali, KwaZulu-Natal, (mHlali river mouth) 29°27′45″S 31°16′45″E
- Umpangazi, KwaZulu-Natal, (Cape Vidal?) 28°07′45″S 32°33′50″E
- Uvongo, KwaZulu-Natal, 30°49′S 30°23′E
- Waterloo Bay, Eastern Cape, 33°29′S 27°10′E
- Yzerfontein, Western Cape, 33°20′S 18°10′E

== See also ==
- Helderberg Marine Protected Area – Marine conservation area in the Western Cape in South Africa
- List of marine invertebrates of the Cape Peninsula and False Bay – Regional biodiversity species list
- List of marine vertebrates of the Cape Peninsula and False Bay – Regional biodiversity species list
- List of brown seaweeds of the Cape Peninsula and False Bay – Regional biodiversity species list
- List of green seaweeds of South Africa
- List of red seaweeds of the Cape Peninsula and False Bay – Regional biodiversity species list
- Geology of Cape Town
- Table Mountain National Park – Nature conservation area on the Cape Peninsula in Cape Town, South Africa
- Table Mountain National Park Marine Protected Area – Marine conservation area around the Cape Peninsula in South Africa
- False Bay – Bay of the Atlantic Ocean at South Africa
