= List of green seaweeds of South Africa =

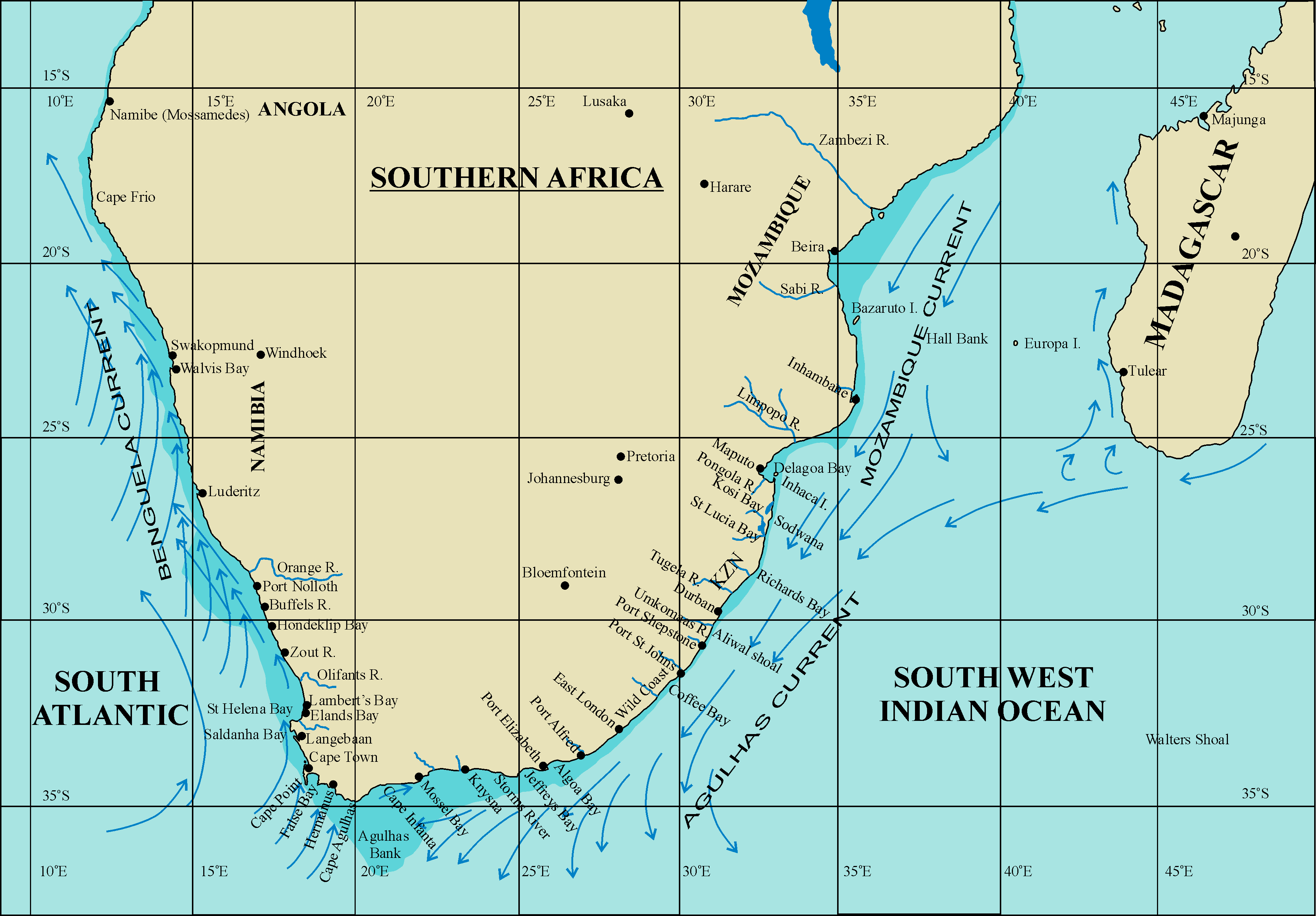
Map of the Southern African coastline showing some of the landmarks referred to in species range statements

Ecoregions of the South African exclusive economic zone

This is a list of green seaweeds recorded from the oceans bordering South Africa. This list comprises locally used common names, scientific names with author citation and recorded ranges. Ranges specified may not be the entire known range for the species, but should include the known range within the waters surrounding the Republic of South Africa.

List ordering and taxonomy complies where possible with the current usage in Algaebase, and may differ from the cited source, as listed citations are primarily for range or existence of records for the region. Sub-taxa within any given taxon are arranged alphabetically as a general rule. Details of each species may be available through the relevant internal links. Synonyms may be listed where useful.

Seaweed, or macroalgae, refers to thousands of species of macroscopic, multicellular, marine algae. The term includes some types of Rhodophyta (red), Phaeophyta (brown) and Chlorophyta (green) macroalgae. Seaweed species such as kelps provide essential nursery habitat for fisheries and other marine species and thus protect food sources; other species, such as planktonic algae, play a vital role in capturing carbon and producing at least 50% of Earth's oxygen.

Natural seaweed ecosystems are sometimes under threat from human activity. For example, mechanical dredging of kelp destroys the resource and dependent fisheries. Other forces also threaten some seaweed ecosystems; for example, a wasting disease in predators of purple urchins has led to an urchin population surge which has destroyed large kelp forest regions off the coast of California.

Humans have a long history of cultivating seaweeds for their uses. In recent years, seaweed farming has become a global agricultural practice, providing food, source material for various chemical uses (such as carrageenan), cattle feeds and fertilizers. Due to their importance in marine ecologies and for absorbing carbon dioxide, recent attention has been on cultivating seaweeds as a potential climate change mitigation strategy for biosequestration of carbon dioxide, alongside other benefits like nutrient pollution reduction, increased habitat for coastal aquatic species, and reducing local ocean acidification. The IPCC Special Report on the Ocean and Cryosphere in a Changing Climate recommends "further research attention" for the purpose of mitigation. (Full article...)

== Class: Bryopsidophyceae ==
=== Order: Bryopsidales ===
==== Family: Bryopsidaceae ====
- Bryopsis africana Areschoug, 1851, (Probably along the whole of the west Cape coast)
- Bryopsis eckloniae Stegenga, Bolton & Anderson 1997, (Muizenberg, endemic)
- Bryopsis hypnoides Lamouroux, 1809c, (False Bay)
- Bryopsis myosuroides Kützing 1856, (Plettenberg Bay eastward, as far north into KwaZulu-Natal as Rabbit Rock)
- Bryopsis plumosa (Hudson 1778) C.Agardh 1823, syn. Ulva plumosa Hudson 1778, (False Bay and eastward)
- Pseudobryopsis hainanensis C.K.Tseng 1936, syn. Trichosolen hainanensis (C.K.Tseng) W.R.Taylor 1962, (KwaZulu-Natal from Mabibi northwards)

==== Family: Caulerpaceae ====
- Caulerpa bartoniae G. Murray, 1896, (Rare in Western Cape, Cape Hangklip and Muizenberg. Mainly from south coast. endemic)
- Caulerpa brachypus f. parvifolia (Harvey) A.B.Cribb 1958, (extending into KwaZulu-Natal as far south as Protea Banks)
- Caulerpa cupressoides (West) C.Agardh 1817, syn. Fucus cupressoides H.West 1802, Chauvinia cupressoides (M.Vahl) Trevisan 1849, (KwaZulu Natal from Mabibi northwards)
- Strap caulerpa Caulerpa filiformis (Suhr) Hering 1841, syn. Amphibolis filiformis Suhr 1834, Himandactylius filiformis (Suhr) Trevisan 1849, (False Bay to northern KwaZulu-Natal)
- Feathery caulerpa Caulerpa holmesiana G. Murray, 1891, (Mainly a south coast species. the westernmost records at Cape of Good Hope, endemic)
- Caulerpa mexicana Sonder ex Kützing 1849, syn. Caulerpa crassifolia f. mexicana (Sonder ex Kützing) J.Agardh 1873, Caulerpa pinnata f. mexicana (Sonder ex Kützing) Weber-van Bosse 1898, (KwaZulu-Natal coast from Aliwal shoal northwards)
- Caulerpa nummularia Harvey ex J.Agardh 1873, syn. Caulerpa peltata var. nummularia (Harvey ex J.Agardh) Weber-van Bosse 1898, Caulerpa racemosa var. nummularia (Harvey ex J.Agardh) D.Dixit 1926, (Sodwana Bay)
- Caulerpa peltata J.V.Lamouroux 1809, syn. Ahnfeldtia peltata (J.V.Lamouroux) Trevisan, Chauvinia peltata (J.V.Lamouroux) Kützing 1849, Caulerpa racemosa var. peltata (J.V.Lamouroux) Eubank 1944, Caulerpa laetevirens Montagne 1842, Chauvinia laetevirens (Montagne) Trevisan 1849, Caulerpa racemosa var. laetevirens (Montagne) Weber-van Bosse 1898, (as C.racemosa var. laetevirens. Port Alfred northwards. As C.racemosa var. peltata, Durban northwards)
- Caulerpa racemosa var. lamourouxii (Turner) Weber-van Bosse 1898, Ahnfeldtia lamourouxii (C.Agardh) Trevisan 1849, Fucus lamourouxii Turner 1811, Chauvinia clavifera var. lamourouxii (Turner) Kützing 1849, (St Lucia northwards)
- Caulerpa scalpelliformis var. intermedia Weber-van Bosse 1898, syn. Caulerpa scalpelliformis f. intermedia (Weber-van Bosse) Svedelius 1906, (KwaZulu-Natal from Mission Rocks northward)
- Caulerpa serrulata var. hummii (Díaz-Piferrer) Farghaly 1980, syn. Caulerpa hummii Díaz-Piferrer 1969, (Sodwana Bay northwards)
- Caulerpa taxifolia f. asplenoides (Greville) Weber-van Bosse 1898, syn. Caulerpa asplenioides Greville 1853, (KwaZulu-Natal coast from Aliwal shoal northwards)
- Caulerpa webbiana Montagne 1837, syn. Chauvinia webbiana (Montagne) Kützing 1849, (Sodwana Bay northwards)
- Caulerpa zeyheri Kützing 1857, syn. Caulerpa racemosa var. zeyheri (Kützing) Weber-van Bosse 1898, (Haga Haga north of East London northwards into Mozambique)

==== Family: Codiaceae ====
- Codium capitatum P.C.Silva 1959, (Port St. Johns northward)
- Duthie's upright codium Codium duthieae Silva in Silva & Womersley, 1956, (Mainly a south and east coast species, westwards as far as Langebaan lagoon.)(From Namibia along the entire South African coast)
- Hairy upright codium Codium extricatum Silva 1959a, (Cape Agulhas to southern KwaZulu-Natal, endemic)
- Fragile upright codium Codium fragile subsp. fragile (Suringar) Hariot 1889, synCodium fragile (Suringar) Hariot subsp. capense Silva 1959a, Acanthocodium fragile Suringar 1867, (Whole of Cape west coast and most of Namibia, Eastward as far as Robberg, Plettenberg Bay)
- Codium isaacii Silva, 1959a, (Namibia to Cape Peninsula, endemic)
- Lucas' codium Codium lucasii Setchell subsp. capense Silva 1959a, (Strand, False Bay to southern Mozambique)
- Codium megalophysum P.C.Silva 1959, (Port Elizabeth to Isipingo, endemic)
- Codium mozambiquense P.C.Silva 1959, (Port Edward northward into Mozambique, Southern African endemic)
- Codium papenfussii Silva, 1959a, (West coast of Cape Peninsula to southern KwaZulu-Natal, single specimen from Sodwana Bay, endemic)
- Flat-lobed codium Codium platylobium Areschoug 1854, (False Bay to mouth of Mtwalume river in KwaZulu-Natal)
- Codium prostratum Levring 1938, (Dwesa, south of Port St. Johns northward into Mozambique)
- Stephens' codium Codium stephensiae Dickinson 1932, (St Helena Bay to Transkei, endemic)

==== Family: Derbesiaceae ====
- Derbesia hollenbergii Taylor 1945, (Muizenberg and Strandfontein, False Bay, and Eastern Cape and Transkei)
- Derbesia marina (Lyngbye) Solier 1846, syn. Vaucheria marina Lyngbye 1819, (Muizenberg, False Bay, and Eastern Cape and Transkei)

==== Family Halimedaceae ====
- Halimeda cuneata Hering in Krauss 1846, (Cape St. Francis eastwards to Mozambique)
- Halimeda gracilis Harvey ex J.Agardh 1887, (Northern Kwazulu-Natal)
- Halimeda tuna (J.Ellis & Solander) J.V.Lamouroux 1816, syn. Halimeda tuna var. typica, Corallina tuna J.Ellis & Solander 1768, (Northern KwZulu-Natal)

==== Family: Udoteaceae ====
- Chlorodesmis sp. indet (Oudekraal, Cape Peninsula, endemic)
- Chlorodesmis hildebrandtii A.Gepp & E.S.Gepp 1911, (North Kwazulu-Natal from Rabbit Rock northwards)
- Pseudocodium devriesii Weber-van Bosse 1896, (East London eastward into Mozambique)
- Pseudocodium floridanum Dawes & Mathieson 1972, (Sodwana Bay area)
- Udotea orientalis A.Gepp & E.S.Gepp 1911, syn. Rhipidosiphon orientalis (A.Gepp & E.Gepp) Farghaly 1980, (Hluleka northwards into Mozambique)

== Class: Chlorophyceae ==
=== Order: Chaetophorales ===
==== Family: Chaetophoraceae ====
- Acrochaete sp. indet (Glencairn (False Bay) and De Hoop nature reserve)
- Stromatella sp. indet (Hondeklipbaai to Yzerfontein)

==== Family: Chroolepidaceae ====
- Sporocladopsis novae-zelandiae Chapman, 1949 (Yzerfonten to East London)

== Class Dasycladophyceae ==
=== Order Dasycladales ===
==== Family Dasycladaceae ====
- Bornetella nitida Munier-Chalmas ex Sonder in Mueller 1880, (Northern KwaZulu-Natal)
- Dasycladus ramosus Y.M.Chamberlain 1958, (Northern KwaZulu-Natal into Mozambique)
- Neomeris vanbosseae M.A.Howe 1909, (Northern KwaZulu-Natal)

== Class Siphonocladophyceae ==
=== Order Siphonocladales ===
==== Family Siphonocladaceae ====
- Chamaedoris auriculata Børgesen 1933, (no range specified)
- Chamaedoris delphinii (Hariot) Feldmann & Børgesen in Borgesen 1940, syn. Siphonocladus delphinii Hariot 1902, (Port Alfred northwards)
- Dictyosphaeria cavernosa (Forsskål) Børgesen 1932, syn. Ulva cavernosa Forsskål 1775, (Island Rock to Bhanga Nek in northern KwaZulu-Natal)
- Dictyosphaeria versluysii Weber-van Bosse 1905, (Island Rock northwards)

==== Family Boodleaceae ====
- Boodlea composita (Harvey) F.Brand 1904, syn. Conferva composita Harvey 1834, Cladophora composita (Harvey) Kützing 1849, Aegagropila composita (Harvey) Kützing 1854, (Sodwana Bay)
- Phyllodictyon anastomosans (Harvey) Kraft & M.J.Wynne 1996, syn. Cladophora anastomosans Harvey 1859, Pterodictyon anastomosans (Harvey) J.E.Gray 1866, Struvea anastomosans (Harvey) Piccone & Grunow ex Piccone 1884, (Sodwana Bay)

==== Family Valoniaceae ====
- Valonia macrophysa Kützing 1843, (Morgan Bay northward)
- Valoniopsis pachynema (G.Martens) Børgesen 1934, syn. Bryopsis pachynema G.Martens 1866, Valonia pachynema (G.Martens) Weber-van Bosse 1913, (St Lucia northward)

== Class: Ulvophyceae ==
=== Order: Cladophorales ===
==== Family Anadyomenaceae ====
- Anadyomene wrightii Harvey ex J.E.Gray 1866, (Shelly Beach northward)
- Microdictyon kraussii J.E.Gray 1866, (Shelly beach northward into Mozambique)

==== Family: Cladophoraceae ====
- Chaetomorpha antennina (Bory de Saint-Vincent) Kützing 1847, syn. Conferva antennina Bory de Saint-Vincent 1804, (Port Edward northwards)
- Chaetomorpha aerea (Dillwyn) Kützing 1849, syn. Conferva aerea Dillwyn 1806, Chloronitum aerea (Dillwyn) Gaillon 1828, (False Bay to Cape Agulhas)
- Chaetomorpha capillaris (Kützing) Børgesen 1925, syn. Rhizoclonium capillare Kützing 1847, (Kraalbaai, Langebaan lagoon)
- Chaetomorpha ligustica (Kützing) Kützing 1849, syn. Conferva ligustica Kützing 1843, Rhizoclonium lubricum Setchell & Gardner in Gardner 1919, (Kraalbaai, Langebaan Lagoon)
- Hair weed Chaetomorpha linum (O.F.Müller) Kützing 1845, syn. Conferva linum O.F.Müller 1778, Lychaete linum (O.F.Müller) Areschoug 1851, (Kalk Bay and Simon's Town harbours)
- Robust hair-weed Chaetomorpha robusta (Areschoug) Papenfuss 1940, syn. Lychaete robusta Areschoug 1851, (Namibia to Hermanus)
- Chaetomorpha sp. indet, (Clovelly, False Bay)
- Cape cladophora Cladophora capensis (C.Agardh) De Toni 1889, syn. Conferva capensis C.Agardh 1824, (Namibia to southern Cape Peninsula)
- Turf cladophora Cladophora contexta Levring 1938, (Olifantsbos to Lüderitz)
- Cladophora dalmatica Kuetzing 1843, (Glencairn, False Bay)
- Blue whip cladophora Cladophora flagelliformis (Suhr) Kützing 1849, syn. Conferva flagelliformis Suhr 1840, Lychaete flagelliformis (Suhr) Areschoug 1851, (Brandfontein to Namibia)
- Cladophora herpestica (Montagne) Kützing 1849, syn. Conferva herpestica Montagne 1842, Aegagropila herpestica (Montagne) Kützing 1854, Cladophoropsis herpestica (Montagne) M.A.Howe 1914, (as Cladophoropsis herpestica, sporadically in South African east coast north of Trafalgar in south KwaZulu-Natal)
- Cladophora horii Hoek & M.Chihara 2000, (The Bluff in Durban, northwards)
- Cladophora isaacii Simons 1960, (Port Nolloth to Cape Hangklip)
- Cladophora mirabilis (C.Agardh) Rabenhorst in Hohenacker 1852, syn. Conferva mirabilis C.Agardh 1820, (Cape Hangklip to Cape Fria, Namibia)
- Cladophora ordinata (Børgesen) C.Hoek 1982, syn. Willeella ordinata Børgesen 1930, (Mkambati (north of Port St Johns) northwards)
- Cladophora prolifera (Roth) Kützing 1843, syn. Conferva prolifera Roth 1797, Chloronitum proliferum (Roth) Gallion 1828, Chantransia prolifera (Roth) Chevalier 1836, Cladophora rugulosa G.Martens 1866, (Port Alfred northwards)
- Cladophora radiosa (Suhr) Kützing 1889, syn. Conferva radiosa Suhr 1834, (Table Bay eastwards to Cape Morgan)
- Cladophora sericia (Hudson) Kützing 1843, syn. Conferva sericea Hudson 1762, Chloronitum sericeum (Hudson) Gallion 1928, (Cape Peninsula north to Melkbosstrand, east to De Hoop nature reserve)
- Cladophora vagabunda (Linnaeus) Hoek 1963, syn. Conferva vagabunda Linnaeus 1753, Ceramium vagabundum (Linnaeus) Roth 1800, (Sodwana Bay and Bhanga Neck in northern KwaZulu-Natal)
- Cladophora sp. indet. (Clovelly to Buffels Bay, Cape Peninsula)
- Rhizoclonium implexum (Dillwyn) Kützing 1845, SYN. Conferva implexa Dillwyn 1809, Rhizoclonium riparium var. implexum (Dillwyn) Rosenvinge 1893, (Kraalbaai, Langebaan lagoon and Clovelly, Cape Peninsula)
- Rhizoclonium riparium (Roth) Harvey 1849, syn. Conferva riparia Roth 1806, Tiresias riparia (Roth) Areschoug 1851, (Kraalbaai and Kowie estuary)

=== Order: Codiolales ===
==== Family: Acrosiphoniaceae ====
- Urospora media Levring 1938, (Port Nolloth and Groenrivier)

=== Order: Ulotrichales ===
==== Family: Ulotrichaceae ====
- Ulothrix flacca (Dillwyn) Thuret in Le Jolis 1863, syn. Conferva flacca Dillwyn 1805, Lyngbya flacca (Dillwyn) Harvey 1849, (Cape Peninsula and False Bay)
- Ulothrix speciosa (Carmichael) Kützing 1849, syn Ulothrix zonata var. speciosa (Carmichael) Stockmayer, Lyngbya speciosa Carmichael 1833, Hormotrichum speciosum (Carmichael) P.L.Crouan & H.M.Crouan 1852, Urospora speciosa (Carmichael) Leblond ex G.Hamel 1931, (Known from a single collection at Kalk Bay)

=== Order: Ulvales ===
==== Family: Ulvaceae ====
- Blidingia marginata (J.Agardh) P.J.L.Dangeard 1958, syn. Enteromorpha marginata J.Agardh 1842, Enteromorpha nana var. marginata (J.Agardh) V.J.Chapman 1956, (Kraalbaai, Langebaan lagoon)
- Blidingia minima (Nägeli ex Kützing) Kylin 1947, syn. Enteromorpha minima Nägeli ex Kützing 1849, Enteromorpha compressa var. minima (Nägeli ex Hauck) Hamel 1931, Enteromorpha nana var. minima (Nägeli ex Hauck) Sjøstedt 1939, (Kraalbaai, Langebaan lagoon to False Bay, and Eastern Cape)
- Chloropelta caespitosa Tanner 1980, (Kalk Bay and Cape Hangklip)
- Enteromorpha atroviridis (Levring) M.J.Wynne 1986, syn. Ulva atroviridis Levring 1938, (Namibia to Oudekraal, Cape Peninsula)
- Percursaria percursa (C.Agardh) Rosenvinge 1893, syn. Zignoa percursa (C.Agardh) Trevisan, Conferva percursa C.Agardh 1817, Enteromorpha percursa (C.Agardh) J.Agardh 1842, (Cape Peninsula - Glencairn, Scarborough, Mouille Point)
- Ulva flexuosa Wulfen 1803, syn. Enteromorpha flexuosa (Wulfen) J.Agardh 1883, (Muizenberg and Dalebrook, False Bay and Eastern Cape)
- Ulva intestinalis Linnaeus 1753, syn. Conferva intestinalis (Linnaeus) Roth 1797, Tetraspora intestinalis (Linnaeus) Desvaux 1818, Scytosiphon intestinalis (Linnaeus) Lyngbye 1819, Enteromorpha intestinalis (Linnaeus) Nees 1820, Fistularia intestinalis (Linnaeus) Greville 1824, Solenia intestinalis (Linnaeus) C.Agardh 1824, Ilea intestinalis (Linnaeus) Leiblein 1827, Hydrosolen intestinalis (Linnaeus) Martius 1833, Ulva enteromorpha var. intestinalis (Linnaeus) Le Jolis 1863, Ulva bulbosa var. intestinalis (Linnaeus) Hariot 1889, Enteromorpha compressa var. intestinalis (Linnaeus) Hamel 1931, (Widespread on west and south coasts, along entire South African coast)
- Ulva lactuca Linnaeus 1753, syn. Phyllona lactuca (Linnaeus) F.H.Wiggers 1780, Ulva fasciata Delile 1813, (Saldanha Bay, False Bay eastwards into Mozambique)
- Ulva linza Linnaeus 1753, syn. Solenia linza (Linnaeus) C.Agardh 1824, Enteronia linza (Linnaeus) Chevallier 1836, Phycoseris linza (Linnaeus) Kützing 1843, Enteromorpha linza (Linnaeus) J.Agardh 1883, (Namibia to False Bay)
- Ulva prolifera O.F.Müller 1778, syn. Ulva enteromorpha f. prolifera (O.F.Müller) Van Heurck, Ulva compressa var. prolifera (O.F.Müller) C.Agardh 1823, Enteromorpha compressa var. prolifera (O.F.Müller) Greville 1830, Enteromorpha prolifera (O.F.Müller) J.Agardh 1883, (Namibia to Eastern Cape)
- Ulva rhacodes (Holmes) Papenfuss 1960, syn. Enteromorpha rhacodes Holmes 1894, (False Bay to Eastern Cape)
- Rigid sea lettuce Ulva rigida C.Agardh 1823, syn. Phycoseris rigida (C.Agardh) Kützing 1843, Ulva lactuca var. rigida (C.Agardh) Le Jolis 1863, (Cape Peninsula to tropical East Africa)
- Ulva uncialis (Kützing) Montagne 1850, syn. Phycoseris uncialis Kützing 1849, Ulva capensis Areschoug 1851, (Namibia to Cape Agulhas)

==== Family: Ulvellaceae ====
- Ulvella sp. indet (Port Nolloth to Yzerfontein)

== See also ==
- List of brown seaweeds of South Africa
- List of red seaweeds of South Africa

== Geographical position of places mentioned in species ranges ==
- Algoa Bay, Eastern Cape, 33°55′S 25°42′E
- Aliwal shoal, KwaZulu-Natal, 30°15′30″S 30°49′30″E
- Arniston (Waenhuiskrans), Western Cape, 34°40′S 20°14′E
- Betty's Bay, Western Cape, 34°22′S 18°56′E
- Bhanga Neck, KwaZulu-Natal, 27°01′00″S 32°50′00″E
- Bird Island, Eastern Cape, 33°50′28″S 26°17′10″E
- Blaauwberg, Western Cape, 33°48′S 18°27′E
- Black Rock, Northern KwaZulu-Natal, 27°08′00″S 32°50′00″E
- Brandfontein, Western Cape, 34°46′S 19°52′E
- Buffelsbaai (Cape Peninsula), Western Cape, 34°19′10″S 18°27′41″E
- Buffelsbaai (west coast), Western Cape, 33°35′S 18°21′E
- Buffelsbaai (south coast), Western Cape, 34°05′S 22°58′E
- Cape Agulhas, Western Cape, 34°50′00″S 20°00′09″E
- Cape Columbine, Western Cape, 32°49′39″S 17°51′23″E
- Cape Frio, Namibia, 18°26′12″S 12°00′17″E
- Cape of Good Hope, Western Cape, 34°21′29″S 018°28′19″E (sometimes used historically to refer to the Cape Province, or South Africa)
- Cape Peninsula, Western Cape 34°12′S 18°24′E
- Cape Hangklip, Western Cape, 34°23′17″S 018°49′35″E
- Cape Infanta, Western Cape, 34°25′S 20°51′E
- Clovelly, False Bay, Western Cape, 34°09′29″S 18°26′11″E
- Dalebrook, False Bay, Western Cape, 34°07′29″S 18°27′11″E
- Danger Point, Western Cape, 34°37′55″S 19°17′34″E
- De Hoop, Western Cape, (just west of Cape Infanta) 32°26′03″S 20°32′52″E
- De Walle, (Die Walle), (Just west of Agulhas) °'S °'E
- Die Dam (Quoin Point), Western Cape, 34°46′S 19°41′E
- Doring Bay (Doringbaai), Western Cape, 31°49′S 18°14′E
- Durban, KwaZulu-Natal, 29°51′S 31°01′E
- Dwesa, Eastern Cape, 32°15′36″S 28°53′42″E
- East London, Eastern Cape, 32°59′S 027°52′E
- False Bay, Western Cape, 34°14′S 18°39′E
- Glencairn, False Bay, Western Cape, 34°09′50″S 18°26′00″E
- Groenrivier (Groen River), 30°50′55″S 17°34′20″E
- Groot Bergrivier estuary (Berg River, Velddrif), Western Cape, 32°47′S 18°10′E
- Haga Haga, Eastern Cape (N of E.London) 32°46′S 28°15′E
- The Haven, Eastern Cape, 150 km west of Port St. Johns, 32°14′50″S 28°55′15″E
- Hermanus, Western Cape, 34°25′S 19°14′E
- Hluleka, Eastern Cape, 31°49′S 29°18′E
- Hondeklipbaai, Northern Cape, 30°19′S 17°16′E
- Hout Bay, Cape Peninsula, Western Cape, 34°03′30″S 18°21′20″E
- Isipingo, KwaZulu-Natal, 29°59′50″S 30°57′20″E
- Island Rock, KwaZulu-Natal, 27°17′00″S 32°46′00″E
- Kalk Bay, False Bay, Western Cape, 34°07′40″S 18°27′00″E
- Kei River, Eastern Cape, 32°40′35″S 28°23′10″E
- Kenton-on-Sea, Eastern Cape, 33°42′S 26°41′E
- Keurboomstrand, Plettenberg Bay, Western Cape, 34°02′17″S 23°23′31″E
- Knysna, Western Cape, 34°05′02″S 23°03′37″E
- Kommetjie, Western Cape, 34°08′S 18°19′E
- Koppie Alleen, De Hoop, Western Cape, °'S °'E
- Kosi Bay, Kwa-Zulu-Natal, 26°54′06″S 32°51′59″E
- Kowie River, Eastern Cape, 33°36′15″S 26°54′12″E
- Kraalbaai, Langebaan lagoon, Western Cape, 33°08′30″S 18°01′45″E
- Lala Nek, KwaZulu-Natal, 27°13′00″S 32°48′00″E
- Lamberts Bay, Western Cape, 32°05′24″S 18°18′10″E
- Leadsman shoal, KwaZulu-Natal, 28°23′00″S 32°25′15″E
- Langebaan Lagoon, Western Cape, 33°09′S 18°04′E
- Llandudno, Cape Peninsula, Western Cape, 34°00′30″S 18°20′20″E
- Lüderitz, Namibia, 26°38′53″S 15°9′34″E
- Mabibi, Kwa-Zulu-Natal, 29°20′10″S 32°45′10″E
- Mapelane, Maphelana, KwaZulu-Natal, near St. Lucia, 28°24′28″S 32°25′44″E
- Melkbosstrand, Western Cape, 33°43′38″S 18°26′06″E
- Mission Rocks, KwaZulu-Natal, 28°16′23″S 32°29′55″E
- Mkambati, KwaZulu-Natal, 31°17′S 29°57′E
- Morgan's Bay, Eastern Cape, (Near Kei mouth) 32°42′0″S 28°21′0″E
- Möwe Bay, Namibia, 19°22′47.85″S 12°42′29.02″E (Möwe Point lighthouse)
- Mtwalume river, KwaZulu-Natal, °'S °'E
- Noordhoek, Cape Peninsula, Western Cape, 34°07′S 18°21′E
- Muizenberg, False Bay, Western Cape, 34°07′S 018°28′E
- Oatlands Point, False Bay, Western Cape, 34°12′30″S 18°27′44″E
- Oudekraal, Cape Peninsula, Western Cape, 33°59′09″S 18°20′55″E
- Olifantsbos, Cape Peninsula, Western Cape, 34°16′23″S 18°22′45″E
- Palm Beach, South Africa, 30°59′S 30°16′E
- Park Rynie, KwaZulu-Natal, 30°19′S 30°44′E
- Paternoster, Western Cape, 32°49′S 17°53′E
- Papenkuilsfontein, Western Cape, 10 km west of Agulhas °'S °'E
- Pearly Beach, Western Cape, 34°39′S 19°29′E
- Platbank, Cape Peninsula, Western Cape, 34°20′5″S 18°29′09″E
- Platboombaai, 34°20′20″S 18°27′08″E
- Plettenberg Bay, Western Cape, 34°03′S 023°22′E
- Ponta do Ouro, Mozambique border, 26°50′36″S 32°53′48″E
- Port Alfred, Eastern Cape, 33°36′15″S 26°54′12″E
- Port Edward, KwaZulu-Natal 31°03′S 30°13′E
- Port Elizabeth, Eastern Cape, 33°58′S 25°35′E
- Port Nolloth, Northern Cape, 22°15′S 16°52′E
- Port St. Johns, KwaZulu-Natal, 31°37′40″S 29°33′20″E
- Postberg, Western Cape, 33°07′S 18°00′E
- Protea Banks, KwaZulu-Natal, 30°50′S 30°28′E
- Rabbit Rock, KwaZulu-Natal, °'S °'E
- Robberg, Western Cape, 34°06′30″S 23°24′45″E
- Rocky Point, Namibia, °'S °'E
- Saldanha Bay, Western Cape,33°01′S 17°59′E
- Saxon Reef, KwaZulu-Natal, (near Mozambique border), °'S °'E
- Scarborough, Cape Peninsula, Western Cape, 34°12′00″S 18°22′13″E
- Scottburgh, KwaZulu-Natal, 30°17′S 30°45′E
- Sea Point, Cape Peninsula, Western Cape, 33°55′19″S 18°22′37″E
- Shelly Beach, KwaZulu-Natal, KwaZulu-Natal, 30°48′S 30°25′E
- Simon's Town, Western Cape, 34°11′S 18°26′E
- Smitswinkel Bay, False Bay, Western Cape, 34°16′S 18°28′E
- Sodwana Bay, KwaZulu-Natal, 27°32′S 32°41′E
- Soetwater, °'S °'E
- Stilbaai (Still Bay), Western Cape, 34°22′S 21°25′E
- St Helena Bay, Western Cape, 32°43′S 18°06′E
- St. James, False Bay, Western Cape, 34°07′29″S 18°27′11″E
- St Lucia, KwaZulu-Natal, 28°23′03″S 32°25′46″E
- Strand, Western Cape, 34°07′S 18°49′E
- Strandfontein, False Bay, Western Cape, 34°05′22″S 18°33′18″E
- Strandfontein, Western Cape, 31°45′20″S 18°13′38″E
- Swakopmund, Namibia, 22°41′S 14°32′E
- Swartklip, False Bay, Western Cape, 34°04′30″S 18°41′10″E
- Swartkops River, 33°51′56″S 25°37′58″E
- Table Bay, Western Cape, 33°53′S 18°27′E
- Three Anchor Bay, Cape Peninsula, Western Cape, 33°54′22″S 19°23′51″E
- Three Sisters (Eastern Cape), Riet River, 10 km west of Port Alfred, Eastern Cape, °'S °'E
- Trafalgar, KwaZulu-Natal, 30°58′S 30°18′E
- Tsitsikamma, Eastern Cape, 34°01′18″S 22°53′44″E
- Umhlali, KwaZulu-Natal, (mHlali river mouth) 29°27′45″S 31°16′45″E
- Umpangazi, KwaZulu-Natal, (Cape Vidal?) 28°07′45″S 32°33′50″E
- Uvongo, KwaZulu-Natal, 30°49′S 30°23′E
- Waterloo Bay, Eastern Cape, 33°29′S 27°10′E
- Yzerfontein, Western Cape, 33°20′S 18°10′E
