= List of seaweeds of the Cape Peninsula and False Bay =

List of seaweeds of the Cape Peninsula and False Bay may refer to:

- List of green seaweeds of the Cape Peninsula and False Bay
- List of brown seaweeds of the Cape Peninsula and False Bay
- List of red seaweeds of the Cape Peninsula and False Bay
