= List of brown seaweeds of the Cape Peninsula and False Bay =

Regional biodiversity species list

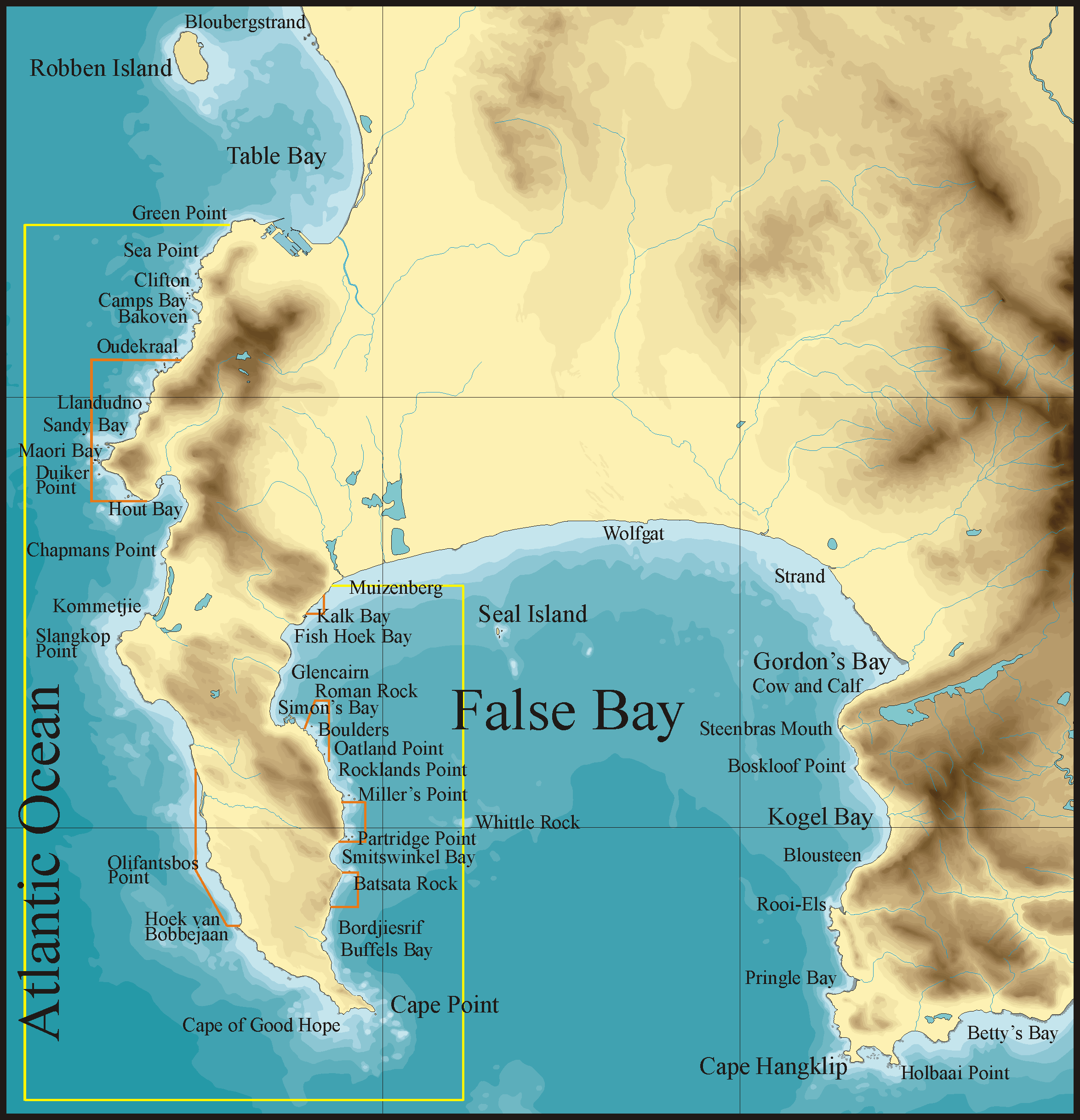
Map of the Cape Peninsula and False Bay coastline showing some of the landmarks referred to in species range statements. Melkbosstrand is a few kilometers north of the displayed area on the west coast. Cape Hangklip is shown on the map to the south east.

Marine ecoregions of the South African exclusive economic zone

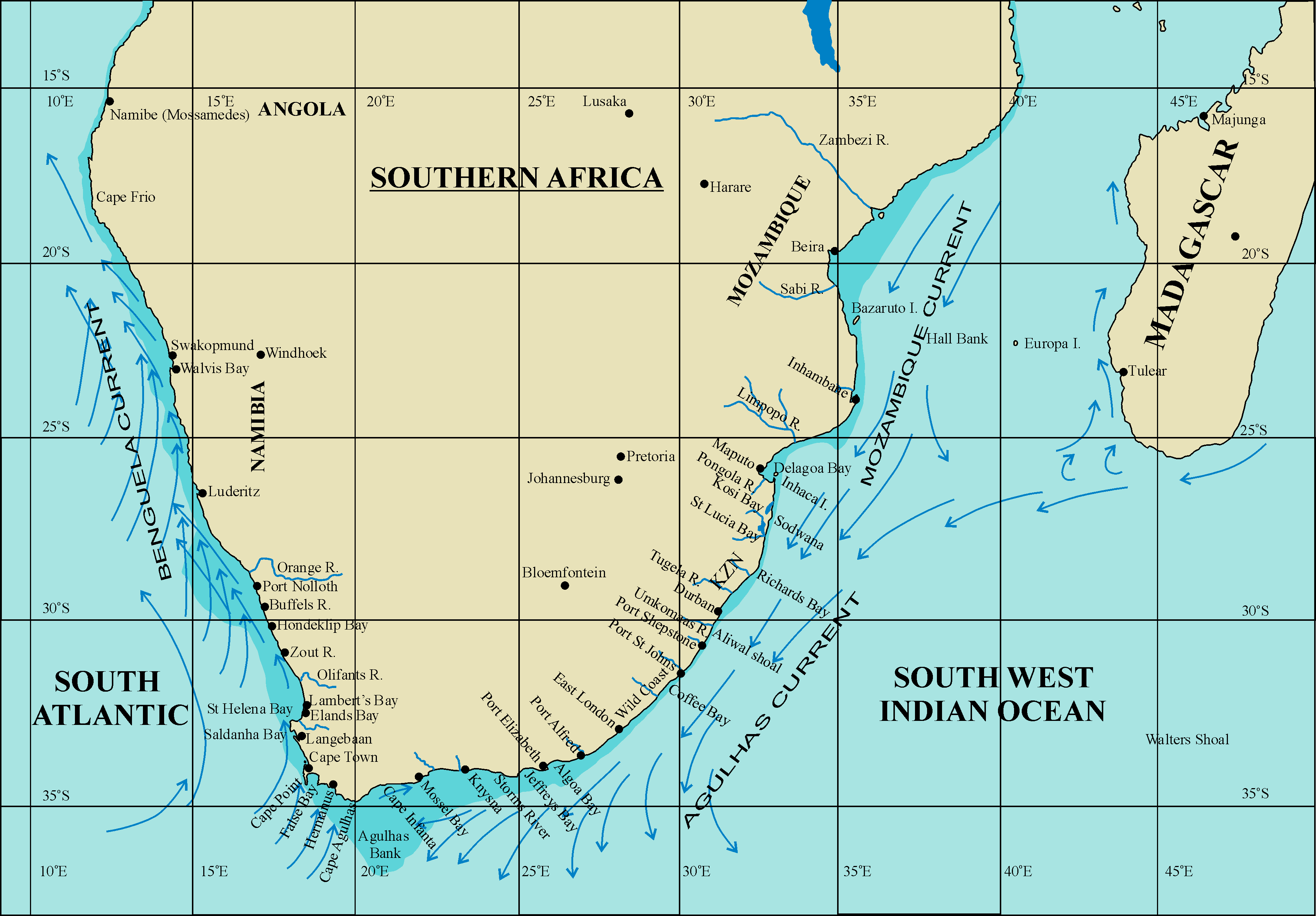
Map of the Southern African coastline showing some of the landmarks referred to in species range statements.

This is a list of brown seaweeds recorded from the oceans bordering The Cape Peninsula in South Africa from Melkbosstrand on the West Coast to Cape Hangklip on the South Coast. This list comprises locally used common names, scientific names with author citation and recorded ranges. Ranges specified may not be the entire known range for the species, but should include the known range within the waters surrounding the Republic of South Africa.

Brown seaweed refers to thousands of species of macroscopic, multicellular, marine algae in the taxon Phaeophyta

The marine ecology is unusually varied for an area of this size, as a result of the meeting of two major oceanic water masses near Cape Point, and the park extends into two coastal marine bioregions. The ecology of the west or "Atlantic Seaboard" side of the Cape Peninsula is noticeably different in character and biodiversity to that of the east, or "False Bay" side. Both sides are classified as temperate waters, but there is a significant difference in average temperature, with the Atlantic side being noticeably colder on average.

List ordering and taxonomy complies where possible with the current usage in Algaebase, and may differ from the cited source, as listed citations are primarily for range or existence of records for the region. Sub-taxa within any given taxon are arranged alphabetically as a general rule. Details of each species may be available through the relevant internal links. Synonyms may be listed where useful.

== Class: Phaeophyceae ==
=== Order: Cutleriales ===
==== Family Cutleriaceae ====
- Aglaozonia sp. (Muizenberg, False Bay. Brandfontein. Bird Island, eastern Cape)

=== Order: Desmarestiales ===
==== Family Desmarestiaceae ====
- Acid weed Desmarestia herbacea subsp. firma (C.Agardh) A.F.Peters, E.C.Yang, F.C.Küpper & Prud'Homme van Reine, 2014, recorded as syn. Desmarestia firma (C.Agardh) Skottsberg in Nordenskjöld 1907, syn. Sporochnus herbaceus var. firma C.Agardh 1824, (Möwe Bay, Namibia to Betty's Bay. Doubtful record for Cape Agulhas)

=== Order: Dictyotales ===
==== Family Dictyotaceae ====
- Dictyota dichotoma (Hudson) J.V.Lamouroux 1809, syn. Ulva dichotoma Hudson 1762, Zonaria dichotoma (Hudson) C.Agardh 1817, Fucus dichotomus (Hudson) Bertolini 1819, Haliseris dichotoma (Hudson) Sprengel 1827, Dichophyllium dichotomum (Hudson) Kützing 1843,(Langebaan and False Bay to Natal. D. dichotoma var. intricata (C.Agardh) Greville 1830, common at Kalk Bay and Dalebrook, and occurring more or less throughout the range of the species)
- Dictyota liturata J.Agardh 1848, (Kommetjie on Cape Peninsula to Umhlali in KwaZulu-Natal)
- Spotted dictyota Dictyota naevosa (Suhr) Montagne 1840, syn. Zonaria naevosa Suhr 1834, Cutleria naevosa (Suhr) Hering ex Krauss 1846, (Die Walle to Umhlali, KwaZulu-Natal)(Cape Peninsula eastward into KwaZulu-Natal as far as Mission Rocks)
- Intricate dictyota, Dictyota spp.
- Multi-fanned zonaria Exallosorus harveyanus (Pappe ex Kützing) J.A.Phillips, 1997. Syn. Zonaria harveyana (Pappe ex Kützing) Areschoug 1851, (Platbank, False Bay to KwaZulu-Natal as far north as Park Rynie. Endemic)
- Articulated zonaria, Zonaria subarticulata (J.V.Lamouroux) Papenfuss, 1944.

=== Order: Ectocarpales ===
==== Family: Acinetosporaceae ====
- Acinetospora crinita (Carmichael) Sauvageau 1899, syn. Acinetospora pusilla var. crinita (Carmichael) Batters, Ectocarpus crinitus Carmichael 1833, (False Bay, Eastern Cape)
- Feldmannia irregularis (Kützing) G.Hamel 1939, syn. Ectocarpus irregularis Kützing 1845, Giffordia irregularis (Kützing) Joly 1965, Hincksia irregularis (Kützing) Amsler 1991, (Cape Peninsula, Langebaan lagoon and Eastern Cape)
- Hincksia granulosa (Smith) P.C.Silva in P.C.Silva, E.G.Meñez & R.L.Moe 1987, Conferva granulosa Smith 1811, Ectocarpus granulosus (Smith) C.Agardh 1828, Giffordia granulosa (Smith) G.Hamel 1939, (Muizenberg and Oudekraal, also Namibia)

==== Family Chordariaceae ====
- Asperococcus compressus A.W.Griffiths ex W.J.Hooker 1833, (Table Bay)
- Furry slime strings, Chordariaceae spp.
- Brown brains Leathesia marina (Lyngbye) Decaisne 1842, syn. Chaetophora marina Lyngbye 1819, Leathesia difformis (Linnaeus) J.E. Areschoug 1847, (All South African coasts: common on west coast, intermittent in eastern Cape and KwaZulu-Natal)
- Myriocladia capensis J. Agardh 1848, (Port Nolloth to De Hoop Nature Reserve, endemic)
- Myriogloea abbreviata Kylin 1940, (Sea Point to Port Nolloth, endemic)
- Myriogloea papenfussii Kylin 1940, (False Bay to Melkbosstrand, endemic)
- Myrionema cf. magnusii (Sauvageau) Loiseaux 1967, syn. Ascocyclus magnusii Sauvageau 1927, (Glencairn)
- Papenfussiella gracilis Kylin 1940, (Platboombaai to Swakopmund, Namibia. Endemic to southern Africa)
- Zeacarpa leiomorpha Anderson, Simons & Bolton 1988, (Yzerfontein to Dalebrook, Probably more widespread)

==== Family Chordariopsidaceae ====
- Cape cord weed Chordariopsis capensis (C.Agardh) Kylin 1940, syn. Chordaria flagelliformis var. capensis C.Agardh 1824, (Cape Frio, Namibia to at least Arniston)

==== Family Ectocarpaceae ====
- Ectocarpus acutus Setchell & Gardner 1922c, (Olifantsbos to Hondeklipbaai)
- Ectocarpus fasciculatus Harvey 1841, (Melkbosstrand to De Hoop)
- Ectocarpus siliculosus (Dillwyn) Lyngbye 1819, syn. Conferva siliculosa Dillwyn 1809, Ceramium siliculosum (Dillwyn) C.Agardh 1811, Ectocarpus confervoides f. siliculosus (Dillwyn) Kjellman 1872, Ectocarpus confervoides var. siliculosus (Dillwyn) Farlow 1881, (Port Nolloth to Eastern Cape)
- Ectocarpus spp.

==== Family: Pylaiellaceae ====
- Bachelotia antillarum (Grunow) Gerloff 1959, syn. Ectocarpus antillarum Grunow 1867, Pylaiella antillarum (Grunow) De Toni 1895, (False Bay to KwaZulu-Natal)

==== Family Scytosiphonaceae ====
- Oyster thief Colpomenia sinuosa (Mertens ex Roth) Derbès & Solier in Castagne 1851, syn. Ulva sinuosa Mertens ex Roth 1806, Encoelium sinuosum (Mertens ex Roth) C.Agardh 1820, Stilophora sinuosa (Mertens ex Roth) C.Agardh 1827, Asperococcus sinuosus (Mertens ex Roth) Bory de Saint-Vincent 1832, Asperococcus sinuosus (C.Agardh) Zanardini 1841, Hydroclathrus sinuosus (Mertens) ex Roth) Zanardini 1843, (Throughout South Africa)
- Compsonema cf. sessile Setchell & Gardner 1922a, (Oudekraal)
- Starred cushion Iyengaria stellata (Børgesen) Børgesen 1939, syn. Rosenvingea stellata Børgesen 1928, Colpomenia stellata (Børgesen) Børgesen 1930, (Southern Cape Peninsula to KwaZulu-Natal)
- Petalonia binghamiae (J.Agardh) K.L.Vinogradova, 1973, also recorded as syn. Endarachne binghamiae J.Agardh 1896, (False Bay eastwards to KwaZulu-Natal as far as Port Edward)
- Petalonia fascia (O.F.Müller) Kuntze 1898, syn. Fucus fascia O.F.Müller 1778, Laminaria fascia (O.F.Müller) C.Agardh 1817, Ulva fascia (O.F.Müller) Lyngbye 1819, Ilea fascia (O.F.Müller) Fries 1835, Phyllitis fascia (O.F.Müller) Kützing 1843, Saccharina fascia (O.F.Müller) Kuntze 1891, (Yzerfontein to Soetwater)
- Sausage skins, Scytosiphon lomentaria (Lyngbye) Link 1833, Chorda lomentaria Lyngbye 1819, Scytosiphon filum var. lomentarius (Lyngbye) C.Agardh 1820, Fucus lomentarius (Lyngbye) Sommerfelt 1826, Scytosiphon simplicissimus (Clemente) Cremades 1990, Ulva simplicissima Clemente 1807, (Simon's Town to Lüderitz)

=== Order: Fucales ===
==== Family Bifurcariopsidaceae ====
- Upright wrack Bifurcariopsis capensis (Areschoug) Papenfuss 1940a, syn. Fucodium capense Areschoug 1854, (Cape Infanta to Groen River)

==== Family Sargassaceae ====
- Long-leafed sargassum Anthophycus longifolius (Turner) Kützing, 1849 syn. Fucus longifolius Turner 1809, Sargassum longifolium (Turner) C.Agardh 1820, Carpophyllum longifolium (Turner) De Toni 1895, (Platboombaai eastwards as far as Uvongo in southern KwaZulu-Natal)
- Constricted axils Axillariella constricta (J.Agardh) P.C.Silva 1959b, syn. Fucodium constrictum J.Agardh 1848, Ascophyllum constricta (J.Agardh) Kuntze 1891, Ascophylla constricta (Kützing) Kuntze 1891, (Cape Peninsula to Cape Columbine)
- Hanging wrack Brassicophycus brassicaeformis (Kützing) Draisma, Ballesteros, F.Rousseau & T.Thibaut 2010, syn. Pycnophycus brassicaeformis Kützing 1860, Bifurcaria brassicaeformis (Kützing) E.S.Barton 1893, (Cape Agulhas to Sea Point)
- Cystophora fibrosa Simons, 1970, (De Walle to Koppie Allen, and Platboom)
- Sargassum elegans Suhr, 1840, (False Bay to Mozambique. Endemic to southern Africa)
- Different-leafed sargassum, Sargassum incisifolium (Turner) C.Agardh 1820, syn. Fucus incisifolius Turner 1811, Sargassum heterophyllum (Turner) C.Agardh, 1820, (False Bay eastward into Mozambique. Restricted to Southern Africa and Madagascar)

=== Order: Laminariales ===
==== Family Laminariaceae ====
- Split-fan kelp Laminaria pallida Greville in J. Agardh 1848, Hafgygia pallida (Greville) Areschchoug 1883, Saccharina pallida (Greville) Kuntze 1891, (Danger Point to Cape Nolloth, as the schinzii form to at least Rocky Point in northern Namibia)
- Bladder kelp Macrocystis pyrifera (Linnaeus) C.Agardh, 1820, also recorded as syn. Macrocystis angustifolia Bory de Saint-Vincent 1826, (Occasional in drift in False Bay. Attached from Cape Point to Paternoster)

==== Family Lessoniaceae ====
- Sea bamboo Ecklonia maxima (Osbeck) Papenfuss 1940b, syn. Fucus maximus Osbeck 1757, (Papenkuilsfontein 10 km west of Cape Agulhas to north of Lüderitz, Namibia)
- Spined kelp Ecklonia radiata (C.Agardh) J.Agardh 1848, Laminaria radiata C.Agardh 1817, Capea radiata (C.Agardh) Endlicher 1843, (Forms with long stipes and rugose blades in False Bay, Spinose forms common at Die Dam, Otherwise species common from Koppie Allen to Southern Natal. Longer stiped smooth bladed form as far east as parts of Zululand)(Deep water populations extend to Sodwana Bay at depths up to 60m)

=== Order: Ralfsiales ===
==== Family Neoralfsiaceae ====
- Neoralfsia expansa (J.Agardh) P.-E.Lim & H.Kawai ex Kraft 2009, syn. Myrionema expansum J.Agardh 1847, Ralfsia expansa (J.Agardh) J.Agardh 1848, (unclear distribution)

==== Family Ralfsiaceae ====
- Ralfsia Ralfsia verrucosa (Areschoug) J.Agardh 1848, syn. Cruoria verrucosa Areschoug 1843, (Common on all west coast shores and probably throughout the Agulhas marine province)

=== Order: Scytothamnales ===
==== Family Splachnidiaceae ====
- Dead man's fingers, Splachnidium rugosum (Linnaeus) Greville 1830, (Dominant in mid-shore throughout west coast, Lüderitz, Namibia to eastern Cape)

=== Order: Sphacelariales ===
==== Family Sphacelariaceae ====
- Sphacelaria brachygonia Montagne 1843, (St. James and Strandfontein, False Bay, More frequent on south coast as far as Transkei)
- Sphacelaria rigidula Kützing 1843, (Kalk Bay in False Bay to at least Transkei)

==== Family Stypocaulaceae ====
- Broom-weed, Halopteris funicularis (Montagne) Sauvageau, 1904, also recorded as syn. Stypocaulon funiculare (Montagne) Kützing 1849, (Port Nolloth to Cape Agulhas and Tsitsikamma)

=== Order: Sporochnales ===
==== Family Sporochnaceae ====
- Carpomitra costata (Stackhouse) Batters 1902, (Algoa Bay. Vulcan Rock, Hout Bay)
- Sporochnus pedunculatus (Hudson) C. Agardh 1820, (Strandfontein)

== Geographical position of places mentioned in species ranges ==
- Algoa Bay, Eastern Cape, 33°55′S 25°42′E
- Aliwal shoal, KwaZulu-Natal, 30°15′30″S 30°49′30″E
- Arniston (Waenhuiskrans), Western Cape, 34°40′S 20°14′E
- Betty's Bay, Western Cape, 34°22′S 18°56′E
- Bhanga Neck, KwaZulu-Natal, 27°01′00″S 32°50′00″E
- Bird Island, Eastern Cape, 33°50′28″S 26°17′10″E
- Blaauwberg, Western Cape, 33°48′S 18°27′E
- Black Rock, Northern KwaZulu-Natal, 27°08′00″S 32°50′00″E
- Brandfontein, Western Cape, 34°46′S 19°52′E
- Buffelsbaai (Cape Peninsula), Western Cape, 34°19′10″S 18°27′41″E
- Buffelsbaai (west coast), Western Cape, 33°35′S 18°21′E
- Buffelsbaai (south coast), Western Cape, 34°05′S 22°58′E
- Cape Agulhas, Western Cape, 34°50′00″S 20°00′09″E
- Cape Columbine, Western Cape, 32°49′39″S 17°51′23″E
- Cape Frio, Namibia, 18°26′12″S 12°00′17″E
- Cape of Good Hope, Western Cape, 34°21′29″S 018°28′19″E (sometimes used historically to refer to the Cape Province, or South Africa)
- Cape Peninsula, Western Cape 34°12′S 18°24′E
- Cape Hangklip, Western Cape, 34°23′17″S 018°49′35″E
- Cape Infanta, Western Cape, 34°25′S 20°51′E
- Clovelly, False Bay, Western Cape, 34°09′29″S 18°26′11″E
- Dalebrook, False Bay, Western Cape, 34°07′29″S 18°27′11″E
- Danger Point, Western Cape, 34°37′55″S 19°17′34″E
- De Hoop, Western Cape, (just west of Cape Infanta) 32°26′03″S 20°32′52″E
- De Walle, (Die Walle), (Just west of Agulhas)
- Die Dam (Quoin Point), Western Cape, 34°46′S 19°41′E
- Doring Bay (Doringbaai), Western Cape, 31°49′S 18°14′E
- Durban, KwaZulu-Natal, 29°51′S 31°01′E
- Dwesa, Eastern Cape, 32°15′36″S 28°53′42″E
- East London, Eastern Cape, 32°59′S 027°52′E
- False Bay, Western Cape, 34°14′S 18°39′E
- Glencairn, False Bay, Western Cape, 34°09′50″S 18°26′00″E
- Groenrivier (Groen River), 30°50′55″S 17°34′20″E
- Groot Bergrivier estuary (Berg River, Velddrif), Western Cape, 32°47′S 18°10′E
- Haga Haga, Eastern Cape (N of E.London) 32°46′S 28°15′E
- The Haven, Eastern Cape, 150 km west of Port St. Johns, 32°14′50″S 28°55′15″E
- Hermanus, Western Cape, 34°25′S 19°14′E
- Hluleka, Eastern Cape, 31°49′S 29°18′E
- Hondeklipbaai, Northern Cape, 30°19′S 17°16′E
- Hout Bay, Cape Peninsula, Western Cape, 34°03′30″S 18°21′20″E
- Isipingo, KwaZulu-Natal, 29°59′50″S 30°57′20″E
- Island Rock, KwaZulu-Natal, 27°17′00″S 32°46′00″E
- Kalk Bay, False Bay, Western Cape, 34°07′40″S 18°27′00″E
- Kei River, Eastern Cape, 32°40′35″S 28°23′10″E
- Kenton-on-Sea, Eastern Cape, 33°42′S 26°41′E
- Keurboomstrand, Plettenberg Bay, Western Cape, 34°02′17″S 23°23′31″E
- Knysna, Western Cape, 34°05′02″S 23°03′37″E
- Kommetjie, Western Cape, 34°08′S 18°19′E
- Koppie Alleen, De Hoop, Western Cape,
- Kosi Bay, Kwa-Zulu-Natal, 26°54′06″S 32°51′59″E
- Kowie River, Eastern Cape, 33°36′15″S 26°54′12″E
- Kraalbaai, Langebaan lagoon, Western Cape, 33°08′30″S 18°01′45″E
- Lala Nek, KwaZulu-Natal, 27°13′00″S 32°48′00″E
- Lamberts Bay, Western Cape, 32°05′24″S 18°18′10″E
- Leadsman shoal, KwaZulu-Natal, 28°23′00″S 32°25′15″E
- Langebaan Lagoon, Western Cape, 33°09′S 18°04′E
- Llandudno, Cape Peninsula, Western Cape, 34°00′30″S 18°20′20″E
- Lüderitz, Namibia, 26°38′53″S 15°9′34″E
- Mabibi, Kwa-Zulu-Natal, 29°20′10″S 32°45′10″E
- Mapelane, Maphelana, KwaZulu-Natal, near St. Lucia, 28°24′28″S 32°25′44″E
- Melkbosstrand, Western Cape, 33°43′38″S 18°26′06″E
- Mission Rocks, KwaZulu-Natal, 28°16′23″S 32°29′55″E
- Mkambati, KwaZulu-Natal, 31°17′S 29°57′E
- Morgan's Bay, Eastern Cape, (Near Kei mouth) 32°42′0″S 28°21′0″E
- Möwe Bay, Namibia, 19°22′48″S 12°42′29″E(Möwe Point lighthouse)
- Mtwalume river, KwaZulu-Natal,
- Noordhoek, Cape Peninsula, Western Cape, 34°07′S 18°21′E
- Muizenberg, False Bay, Western Cape, 34°07′S 018°28′E
- Oatlands Point, False Bay, Western Cape, 34°12′30″S 18°27′44″E
- Oudekraal, Cape Peninsula, Western Cape, 33°59′09″S 18°20′55″E
- Olifantsbos, Cape Peninsula, Western Cape, 34°16′23″S 18°22′45″E
- Palm Beach, South Africa, 30°59′S 30°16′E
- Park Rynie, KwaZulu-Natal, 30°19′S 30°44′E
- Paternoster, Western Cape, 32°49′S 17°53′E
- Papenkuilsfontein, Western Cape, 10 km west of Agulhas
- Pearly Beach, Western Cape, 34°39′S 19°29′E
- Platbank, Cape Peninsula, Western Cape, °'"S °'E34°20′5″S 18°29′09″E
- Platboombaai, 34°20′20″S 18°27′08″E
- Plettenberg Bay, Western Cape, 34°03′S 023°22′E
- Ponta do Ouro, Mozambique border, 26°50′36″S 32°53′48″E
- Port Alfred, Eastern Cape, 33°36′15″S 26°54′12″E
- Port Edward, KwaZulu-Natal 31°03′S 30°13′E
- Port Elizabeth, Eastern Cape, 33°58′S 25°35′E
- Port Nolloth, Northern Cape, 22°15′S 16°52′E
- Port St. Johns, KwaZulu-Natal, 31°37′40″S 29°33′20″E
- Postberg, Western Cape, 33°07′S 18°00′E
- Protea Banks, KwaZulu-Natal, 30°50′S 30°28′E
- Rabbit Rock, KwaZulu-Natal,
- Robberg, Western Cape, 34°06′30″S 23°24′45″E
- Rocky Point, Namibia,
- Saldanha Bay, Western Cape, 33°01′S 17°59′E
- Saxon Reef, KwaZulu-Natal, (near Mozambique border),
- Scarborough, Cape Peninsula, Western Cape, 34°12′00″S 18°22′13″E
- Scottburgh, KwaZulu-Natal, 30°17′S 30°45′E
- Sea Point, Cape Peninsula, Western Cape, 33°55′19″S 18°22′37″E
- Shelly Beach, KwaZulu-Natal, KwaZulu-Natal, 30°48′S 30°25′E
- Simon's Town, Western Cape, 34°11′S 18°26′E
- Smitswinkel Bay, False Bay, Western Cape, 34°16′S 18°28′E
- Sodwana Bay, KwaZulu-Natal, 27°32′S 32°41′E
- Soetwater,
- Stilbaai (Still Bay), Western Cape, E34°22′S 21°25′E
- St Helena Bay, Western Cape, 32°43′S 18°06′E
- St. James, False Bay, Western Cape, 34°07′29″S 18°27′11″E
- St Lucia, KwaZulu-Natal, 28°23′03″S 32°25′46″E
- Strand, Western Cape, 34°07′S 18°49′E
- Strandfontein, False Bay, Western Cape, 34°05′22″S 18°33′18″E
- Strandfontein, Western Cape, 31°45′20″S 18°13′38″E
- Swakopmund, Namibia, 22°41′S 14°32′E
- Swartklip, False Bay, Western Cape, 34°04′30″S 18°41′10″E
- Swartkops River, 33°51′56″S 25°37′58″E
- Table Bay, Western Cape, 33°53′S 18°27′E
- Three Anchor Bay, Cape Peninsula, Western Cape, 33°54′22″S 19°23′51″E
- Three Sisters (Eastern Cape), Riet River, 10 km west of Port Alfred, Eastern Cape,
- Trafalgar, KwaZulu-Natal, 30°58′S 30°18′E
- Tsitsikamma, Eastern Cape, 34°01′18″S 22°53′44″E
- Umhlali, KwaZulu-Natal, (mHlali river mouth) 29°27′45″S 31°16′45″E
- Umpangazi, KwaZulu-Natal, (Cape Vidal?) 28°07′45″S 32°33′50″E
- Uvongo, KwaZulu-Natal, 30°49′S 30°23′E
- Waterloo Bay, Eastern Cape, 33°29′S 27°10′E
- Yzerfontein, Western Cape, 33°20′S 18°10′E

== See also ==
- Helderberg Marine Protected Area – Marine conservation area in the Western Cape in South Africa
- List of marine animals of the Cape Peninsula and False Bay
- List of brown seaweeds of South Africa
- Marine geology of the Cape Peninsula and False Bay
- Table Mountain National Park – Nature conservation area on the Cape Peninsula in Cape Town, South Africa
- Table Mountain National Park Marine Protected Area – Marine conservation area around the Cape Peninsula in South Africa
- False Bay – Bay of the Atlantic Ocean at South Africa
