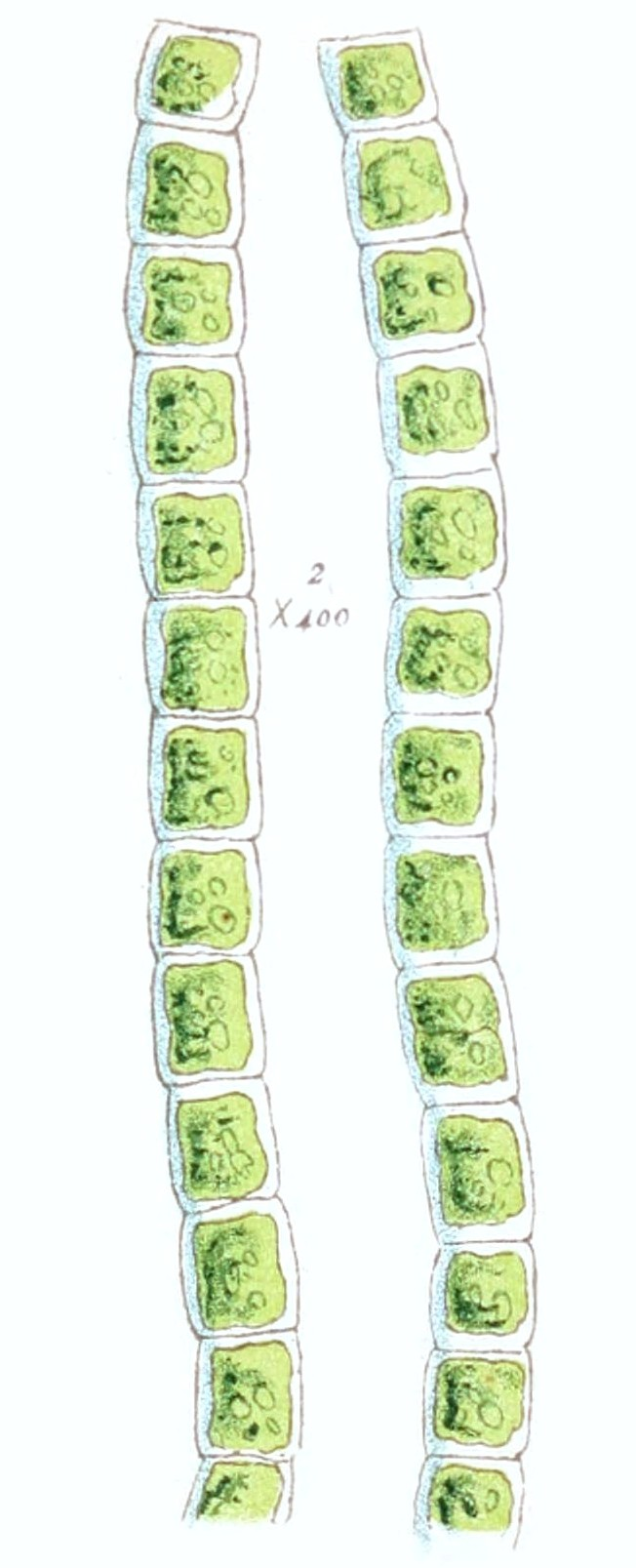

Scientific classification
- Clade: Viridiplantae
- Division: Chlorophyta
- Class: Ulvophyceae
- Order: Ulotrichales
- Family: Ulotrichaceae
- Genus: Ulothrix
- Species: U. aequalis

Binomial name
- Ulothrix aequalis Kützing

= Ulothrix aequalis =

Species of alga

Ulothrix aequalis is a species of green algae. It is a freshwater species, typically found in running waters. It has been reported from Europe, the Americas, Asia, and New Zealand.

== Description ==
Ulothrix aequalis consists of uniseriate filaments of cells. The cells are cylindrical, 12–22 microns broad and 26–30 microns long. They are attached a cell or rhizoids at the base. The cell wall is more or less thickened and often striated. Cells each contain a broad, girdle-shaped chloroplast which covers at least half of the cell circumference; the chloroplast has one or two pyrenoids.

Asexual reproduction is by zoospores or aplanospores. Akinetes are also produced, and they lack distinct ornamentation. Sexual reproduction is via biflagellate gametes.
