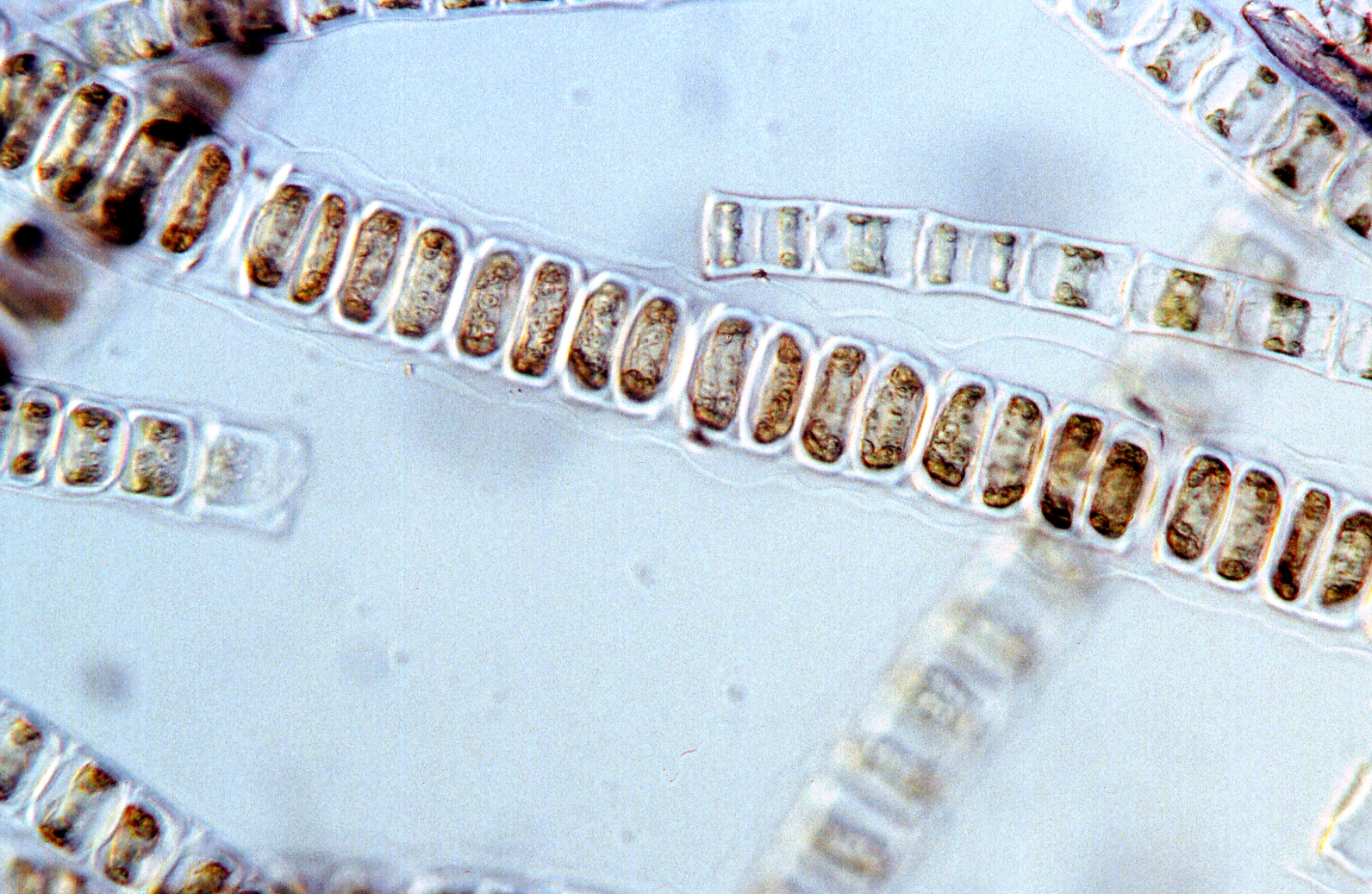

Scientific classification
- Kingdom: Plantae
- Division: Chlorophyta
- Class: Ulvophyceae
- Order: Ulotrichales
- Family: Ulotrichaceae
- Genus: Ulothrix; Kützing (orth. var. Kuetzing)

Type species
- Ulothrix tenuissima Kützing

Species
- Ulothrix zonata; Ulothrix moniliformis; Ulothrix aequalis; Ulothrix simplex

= Ulothrix =

Genus of algae

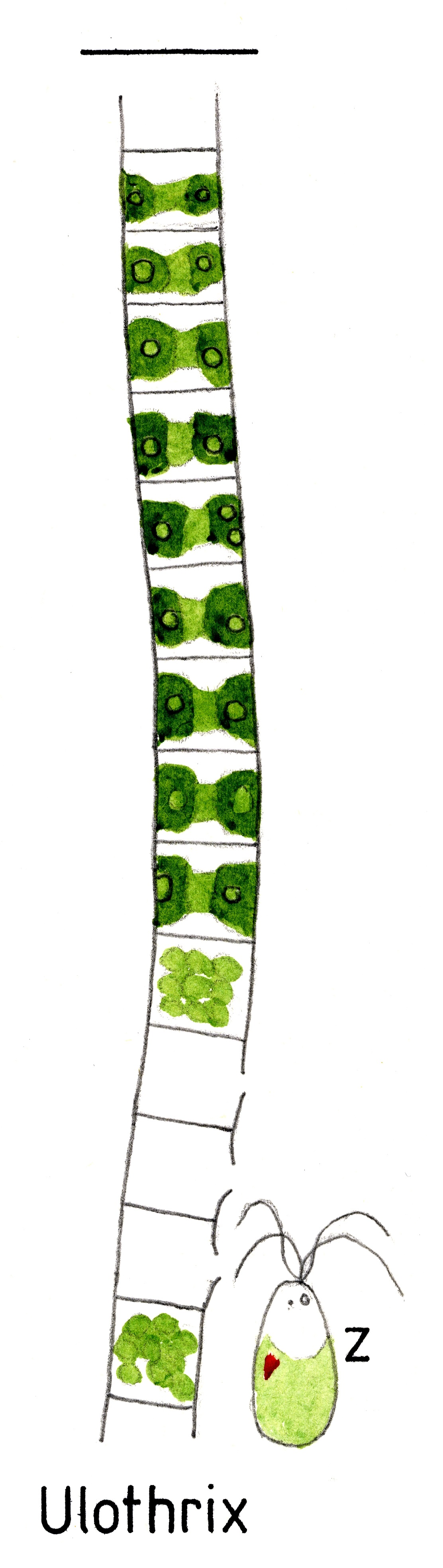

Ulothrix is a genus of green algae in the family Ulotrichaceae. It is a common in fresh to marine habitats, particularly colder and temperate waters. It has a cosmopolitan distribution.

The genus includes:

- Ulothrix aequalis Kützing
- Ulothrix moniliformis Kützing
- Ulothrix flacca (Dillwyn) Thuret in Le Jolis
- Ulothrix implexa (Kützing) Kützing
- Ulothrix speciosa (Carmichael ex Harvey in Hooker) Kützing
- Ulothrix tenerrima Kützing
- Ulothrix tenuissima Kützing
- Ulothrix zonata (Weber et Mohr) Kützing

== Description ==
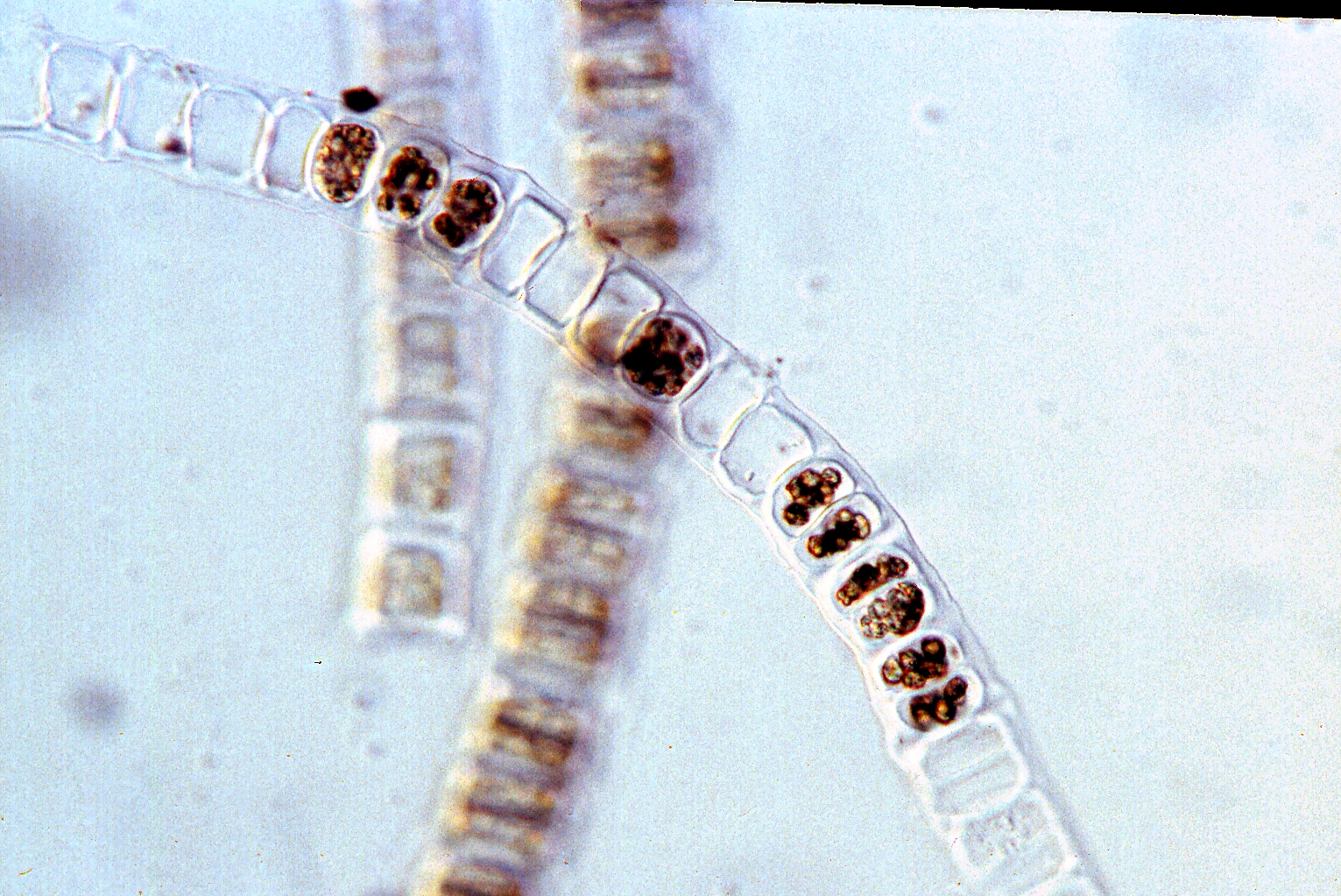
Ulothrix

Ulothrix consists of cells arranged end-to-end to form unbranched, uniseriate filaments. The filament is attached to a substrate via a basal cell, which may be rhizoidal. Cells are cylindrical or barrel-shaped; the apical cell may somewhat rounded at its terminal end. The cell wall in young cells is thin and smooth, but becomes thick (and sometimes roughened) with age. Each cell has a single girdle-like and parietal chloroplast, which partially or fully circles the cell's circumference. The chloroplast contains a single pyrenoid which is surrounded by a starch envelope. Cells are uninucleate. Older cells may accumulate starch, oil or volutin granules. The filaments may be surrounded by a layer of mucilage.

Species of Ulothrix are identified based on the presence/absence of mucilage, the dimensions of cells, characteristics of the cell wall, and characteristics of the akinetes. The taxonomy of the genus is rather poorly known A similar genus is the poorly known Pearsoniella, which differs in having completely closed (ring-shaped) chloroplasts, and sometimes having multiseriate filaments. It is a monotypic genus known from freshwater.

=== Reproduction ===
Vegetative reproduction in Ulothrix typically occurs via fragmentation, wherein the fragments develop into new filaments. Some of the vegetative cells of Ulothrix can occasionally develop into thick-walled akinetes.

Asexual reproduction occurs via the formation of zoospores; zoospores are produced in multiples by vegetative cells, except for those with rhizoids. Zoospores are quadriflagellate (with four flagella) and have a cup-shaped chloroplast with a distinct stigma, and are positively phototactic. Aplanospores may be formed when the development of zoospores is arrested. Sexual reproduction is monoecious or dioecious, involving isogamous, biflagellate gametes. Gametes are produced in all but differentiated cells; filaments producing gametes are often curved and more yellowish-green. Gametes are spindle-shaped, positively phototactic. The resulting zygote is negatively phototactic and forms a unicellular, Codiolum-stage sporophyte. However, the life cycle of Ulothrix is incompletely known. It may be different depending on the species, and the existence of the sporophyte phase has been questioned.

Ulothrix typically produces zoospores when days are short (i.e. the winter) and produces gametes when days are long (i.e. summer).

== Habitat ==
Ulothrix grows attached to substrates and grows as long filaments up to a few centimeters long. The filaments form tufts or mats. In freshwater, Ulothrix is particularly common in aerated places like the shores of lakes, rivers, and brooks; it is nearly absent from bogs. In brackish or marine habitats, it can be found in the intertidal zone or at the mouths of rivers; here, the environment can vary widely on a daily basis due to tides.
