= Bryopsis africana =

Scientific classification
- Clade: Viridiplantae
- Division: Chlorophyta
- Class: Ulvophyceae
- Order: Bryopsidales
- Family: Bryopsidaceae
- Genus: Bryopsis
- Species: B. africana

Binomial name
- Bryopsis africana Areschoug

Synonyms
- Bryopsis tenuis Levring, 1938

Species of alga

Bryopsis africana is a species of green alga from South Africa. It is given the common name sea moss.
