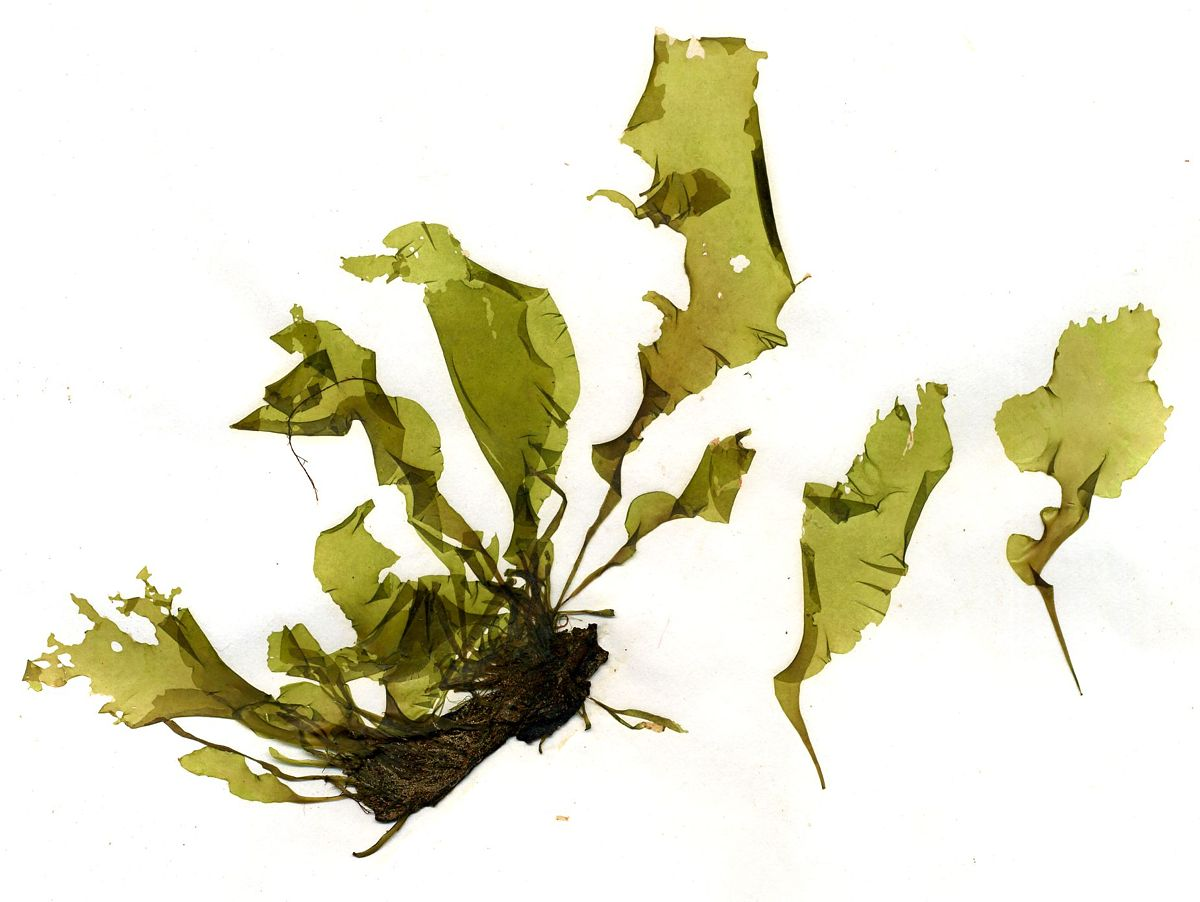

Scientific classification
- Kingdom: Plantae
- Division: Chlorophyta
- Class: Ulvophyceae
- Order: Ulvales
- Family: Ulvaceae
- Genus: Ulva
- Species: U. linza

Binomial name
- Ulva linza Linnaeus, 1753

Synonyms
- Enteromorpha linza

= Ulva linza =

Species of seaweed

Ulva linza is a green alga in the family Ulvaceae that can be found in British Isles.

== Description ==
Ulva (Enteromorpha) linza (Linnaeus) is a 30 centimetres (12 in) (sometimes 45 centimetres (18 in)) long green alga that grows in bright green clusters of tubes or flat strips. It has unbranched thalli that often have a frilled margin. The thallus middle is greater than its base and can be as wide as 5 centimetres (2.0 in). Its ruffled blades are 1–4 centimetres (0.39–1.57 in) long while its cells are 10–15 micrometres (0.00039–0.00059 in) in diameter.

Ulva linza found in Rhode Island have branched or unbranched flattened tubes. The thallus length ranges from 1.9 –36 cm with a mean length of 18.6 cm. The thallus width ranges from 0.2 to 4.8 cm with a mean width of 1.4 cm. Ulva linza can be distinguished by its smooth thallus, most with a ruffled margin. Ulva linza can tolerate a wide range of salinities and water qualities. Laboratory experiments have shown a broad tolerance to the environmental conditions of irradiance, temperature, salinity, and a wide range of nitrogen and phosphorus concentrations.

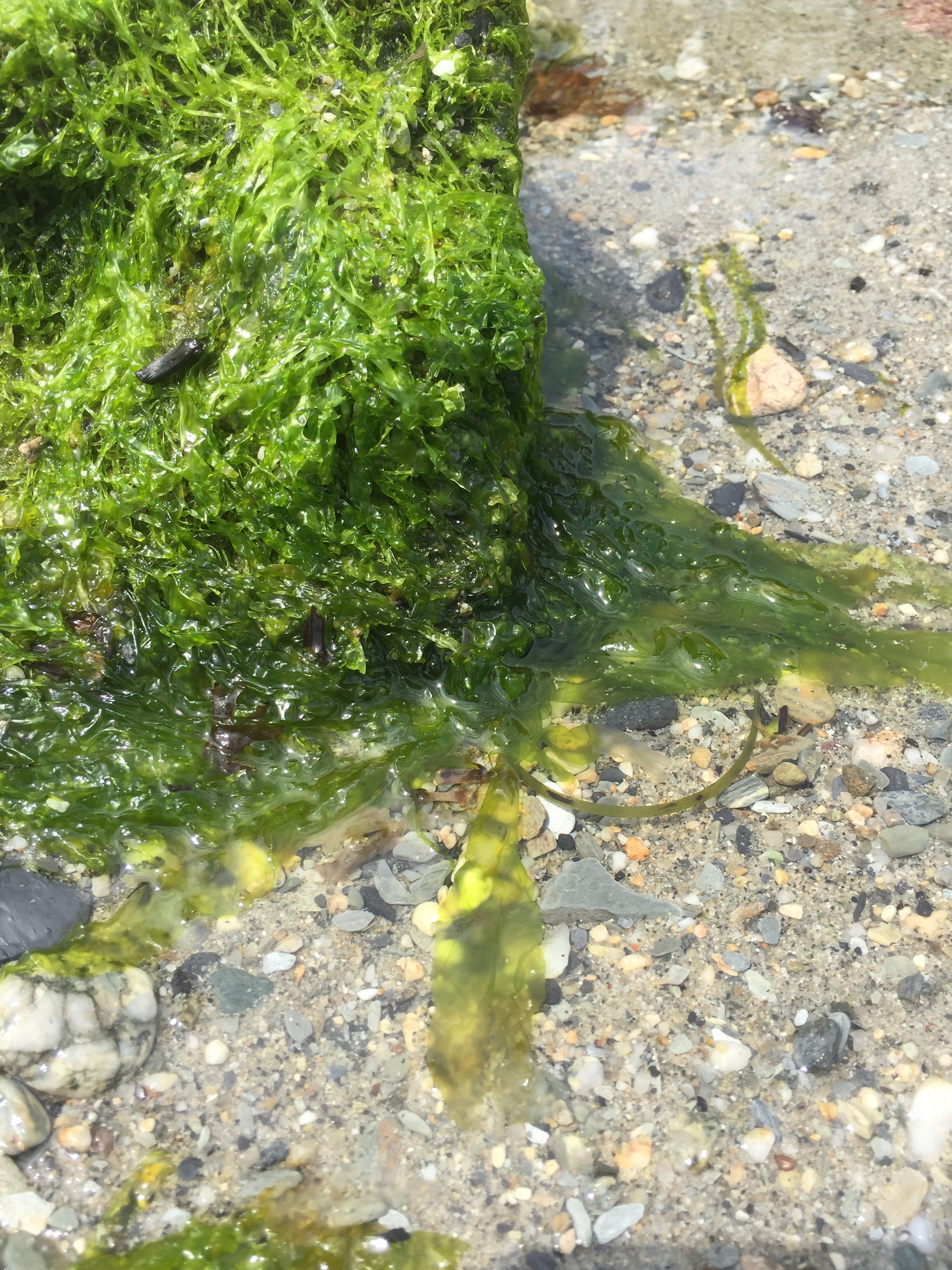
Photo of Ulva linza in Narragansett Bay, Rhode Island. Photo by Kayla Kurtz.

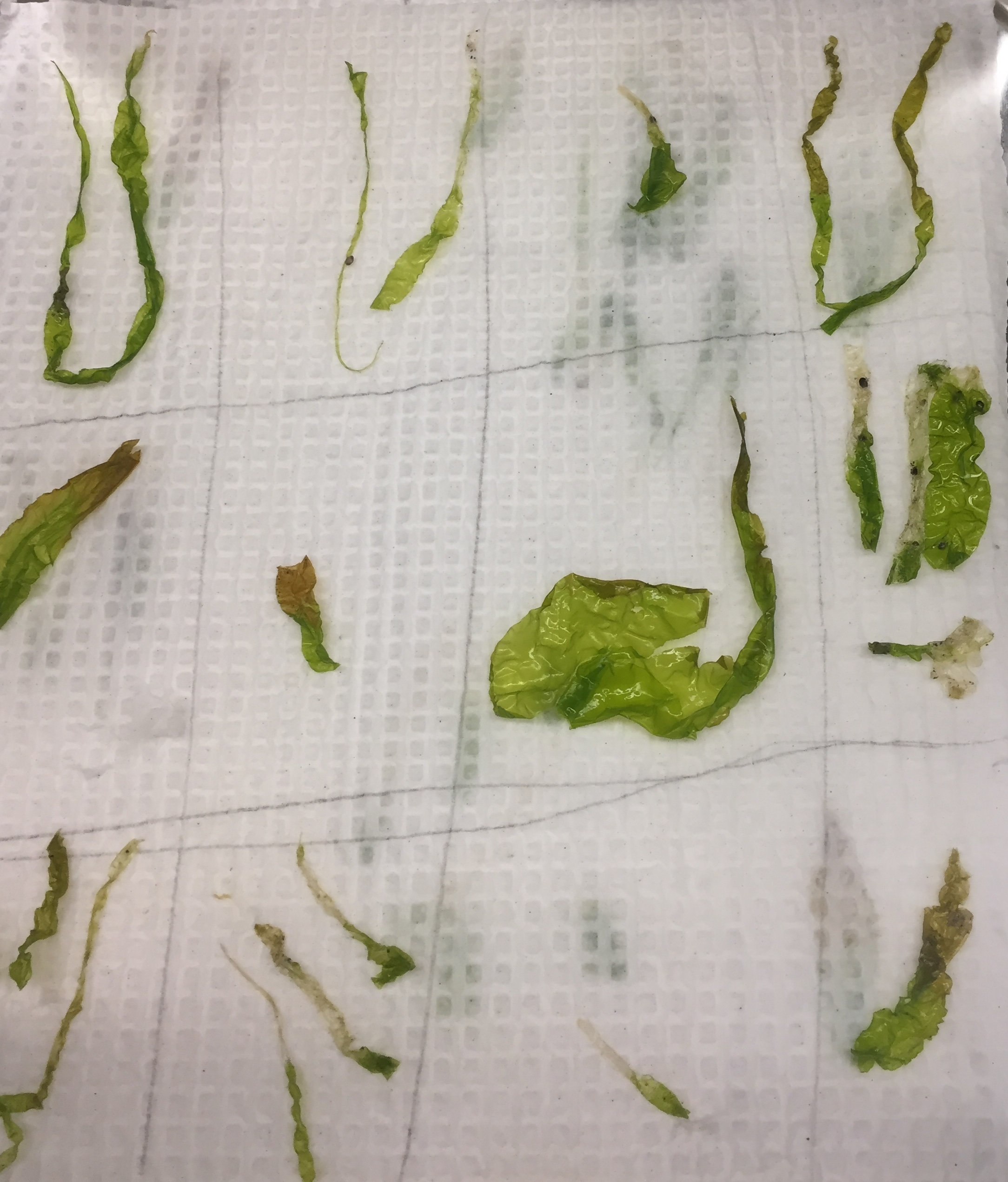
Photo of Ulva linza harvested from Narragansett Bay, Rhode Island. Photo by Kayla Kurtz.

Ulva linza alternates between sexual (gametophyte producing gametes) and asexual (sporophyte producing zoospores) stages. Spores with two or four flagella are released from the thalli. Zoospores with four flagella (quadriflagellated zoospores) rapidly settle on surfaces. Biflagellate spores are typed as female (+) gametes, male (-) gametes, or asexual biflagellate zoospores.

Ulva species have been reported as a dominant species leading to blooms of green macroalgae often referred to as “green tides.” These green tides and marine fouling are attributed to their thallus morphological characteristics, fast growth rates in eutrophic ecosystems, and rapid uptake and assimilation of nutrients. These blooms are generally explained by eutrophication caused by increased nutrient loads (i.e., nitrogen and phosphorus) from events such as runoff, sewage outflow, and upwelling.

== Habitat ==
They are littoral and sublittoral species which grow in muddy estuaries attached to pebbles or docks. They also can be found on rocks or in rock pools. Ulva linza can be found in the upper intertidal zone of seashores.

Ulva linza has been found in Wembury beach, UK, Narragansett Bay, Rhode Island, the British Isles, and China.

== Uses ==
The species is edible and therefore can be used as food and in cosmetic products. Ulva linza is used as a model organism for biofouling in marine environments. It has been found on a variety of man-made structures including ships’ hulls.
