= Bryopsidophyceae =

Class of algae

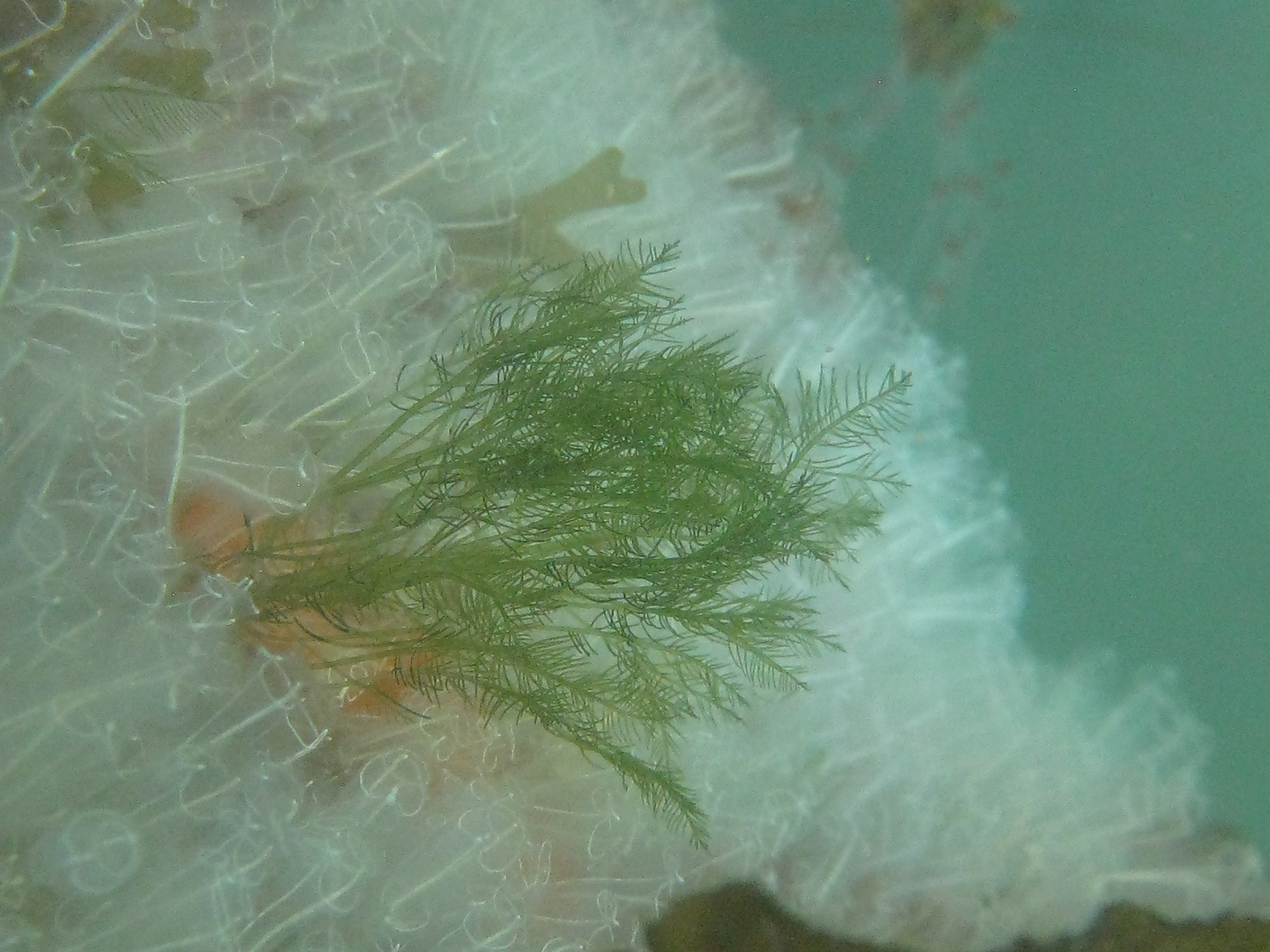
Bryopsis plumosa

Bryopsidophyceae is an unaccepted class of chlorophyte green algae. The order Bryopsidales has been included in the class Ulvophyceae. However, several recent phylogenomic studies have recovered Bryopsidales as sister clade to the Chlorophyceae.
