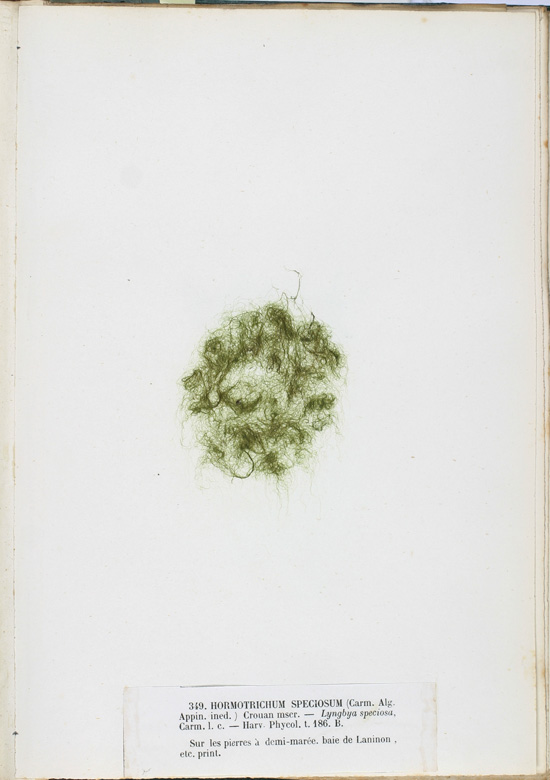

Scientific classification
- Clade: Viridiplantae
- Division: Chlorophyta
- Class: Ulvophyceae
- Order: Ulotrichales
- Family: Ulotrichaceae
- Genus: Ulothrix
- Species: U. speciosa

Binomial name
- Ulothrix speciosa (Carmichael) Kützing

= Ulothrix speciosa =

Marine algae

Ulothrix speciosa is a species of green algae in the family Ulotrichaceae. It is a marine or brackish species, typically found in the littoral zone.

== Description ==
Ulothrix flacca consists of greenish filaments attached to a substrate, which grow up to 12 cm long. Filaments are robust, soft, straight when young, becoming curled at maturity. It grows in flowing or spreading tufts. The filaments are unbranched but may end up becoming tangled. Cells are attached to a substrate via a differentiated basal cell, or intercalary cells which develop rhizoids. Cells are cylindrical, with swollen ends when older; the filaments may be occasionally in multiseriate rows. Cells are typically 14.8–63.6 μm wide, and 4.8-15.6 μm tall. Near the basal part of the filament, cells are often narrower and shorter. Cells contain a single chloroplast, which is parietal and sometimes lobed; older cells may have a more reticulate chloroplast. The chloroplast shape varies with age: in young cells, the chloroplasts tend to be shorter, and cover less of the cell circumference. Chloroplasts have one to six pyrenoids. A single nucleus is present per cell.

Ulothrix speciosa may reproduce vegetatively by fragmentation of filaments. It also reproduces asexually or sexually; in both cases, vegetative cells (except for those producing rhizoids) develop into zoosporangia or gametangia, respectively. Gametangia develop from vegetative cells (except basal cells or cells with rhizoids), and mature gametangia are olivaceous. The gametangia release the gametes through the dissolution of the cell wall. Gametes are biflagellate, spindle-shaped to ovoid, with a cup-shaped chloroplast containing a pyrenoid, and a small eyespot. U. speciosa is dioecious, and isogamous. The gametes fuse to form quadriflagellate zygotes, which form a single-celled sporophyte phase. The sporophyte stage produces up to 128 zoospores or aplanospores. Zoospores are similar in morphology to gametes but slightly larger and quadriflagellate.

== Habitat and distribution ==
Ulothrix speciosa commonly grows on both hard surfaces (such as rocks) and soft ones (such as mud in saltmarshes). It grows in brackish or marine habitats, and is most abundant during winter and spring. In general, it prefers sheltered habitats, as it is often washed away by vigorous wave action.
