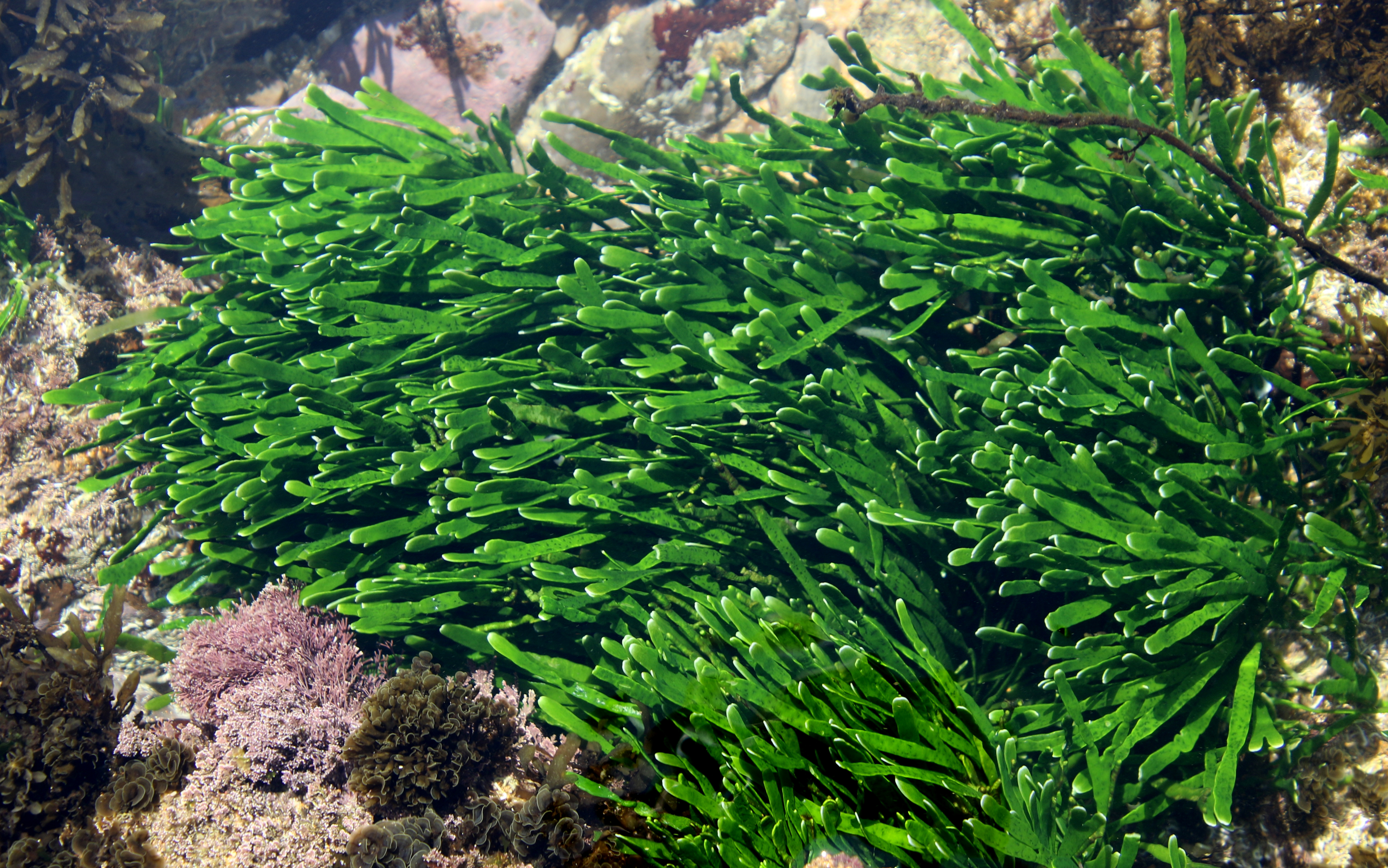
- Turimetta Beach, Australia

Scientific classification
- Clade: Viridiplantae
- Division: Chlorophyta
- Class: Ulvophyceae
- Order: Bryopsidales
- Family: Caulerpaceae
- Genus: Caulerpa
- Species: C. filiformis

Binomial name
- Caulerpa filiformis (Suhr) Hering 1841

= Caulerpa filiformis =

Species of seaweed

Caulerpa filiformis is a species of seaweed in the Caulerpaceae family. It has been recorded at coastal sites in Australia and South Africa.
