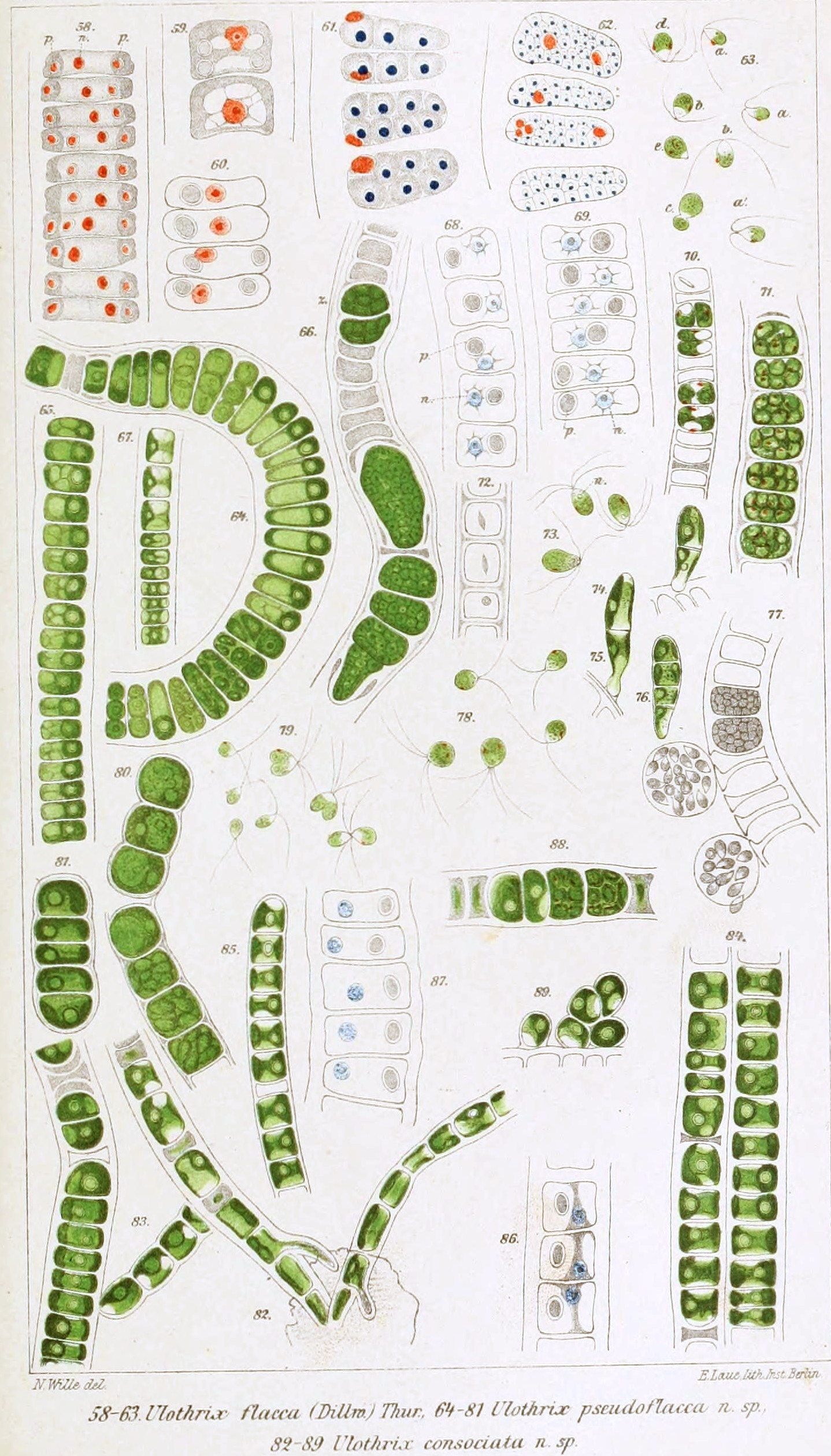

Scientific classification
- Clade: Viridiplantae
- Division: Chlorophyta
- Class: Ulvophyceae
- Order: Ulotrichales
- Family: Ulotrichaceae
- Genus: Ulothrix
- Species: U. flacca

Binomial name
- Ulothrix flacca (Dillwyn) Thuret, 1863

= Ulothrix flacca =

Species of alga

Ulothrix flacca is a species of green algae in the family Ulotrichaceae. It is a marine or brackish species, typically found in the intertidal zone.

== Description ==
Ulothrix flacca grows as small tufts of green unbranched filaments growing to no more than 10 cm long, forming woolly masses attached to rocks. It consists of soft, long filaments which are uniseriate (very rarely a cell may undergo longitudinal division and become biseriate). Basal cells are elongated, or in mature filaments, differentiated into a complex rhizoidal branching system. Cells are cylindrical, 14.4–32.6 μm broad and 4.8–9.6 μm, Cells contain a single chloroplast, which is parietal and sometimes lobed. The chloroplast shape varies with age: in young cells, the chloroplasts tend to be shorter and covering less of the cell circumference. Chloroplasts typically have one to three pyrenoids.

Ulothrix pseudoflacca and Ulothrix consociata are considered to be forms of Ulothrix flacca by some biologists. Sometimes difficult to distinguish Ulothrix from Urospora.

=== Reproduction ===
Ulothrix flacca may reproduce vegetatively by fragmentation of filaments. It also reproduces asexually or sexually; in both cases, vegetative cells (except for those producing rhizoids) develop into zoosporangia or gametangia, respectively. Zoosporangia are yellow-green, somewhat longer than vegetative cells. Each zoosporangium produces typically 8–32 zoospores; the zoospores are typically 6.6–10.6 μm long, spindle-shaped and with two flagella, a cup-shaped chloroplast, pyrenoid and a small stigma. Zoospores are released through an opening in the cell wall of the zoosporangium; after swimming, they attach to a hard substrate, lose their flagella, and germinate into new filaments. Aplanospores may also be produced instead of zoospores; aplanospores may begin germination in the zoosporangium.

Gametangia are olive-brown, similar in morphology to zoospores but somewhat smaller. Gametic fusion is monoecious and isogamous. The resulting zygotes have four flagella; the zygotes develop into a small, single-celled sporophyte phase. The sporophyte then undergoes meiosis to form zoospores or aplanospores.

== Habitat and distribution ==
Ulothrix flacca is common all around the British Isles. It has been recorded from Scandinavia south to Portugal, in the Mediterranean and the Black Sea, and also all around the world into the Pacific.

It is found on rocks, stones and epiphytically on other algae. It has a wide habitat range in the littoral zone, but it is typically absent from beaches.
