= Green River (Northern Cape) =

Green River Groenrivier
- Location within South Africa

Location
- Country: South Africa
- Province: Northern Cape

Physical characteristics
- Source: Kamiesberge
- Mouth: Atlantic Ocean
  - location: Western Cape, South Africa
  - coordinates: 30°50′S 17°35′E
  - elevation: 0 m (0 ft)
- Basin size: 4,500 km^{2} (1,700 sq mi)

The Green River or Groen River (Afrikaans: Groenrivier) is a river in the Northern Cape province of South Africa. It originates in the Kamiesberge range and has a catchment area of about 4500 km^{2}. The river mouth is located about 120 km NNW of Strandfontein in the Namaqua National Park area by the Green River Mouth Lighthouse.

There is diamond exploration in the Green River Valley.

== See also ==
- List of rivers of South Africa
