= Scarborough, Western Cape =

Seaside suburb in Cape Town, Western Cape, South Africa

Scarborough
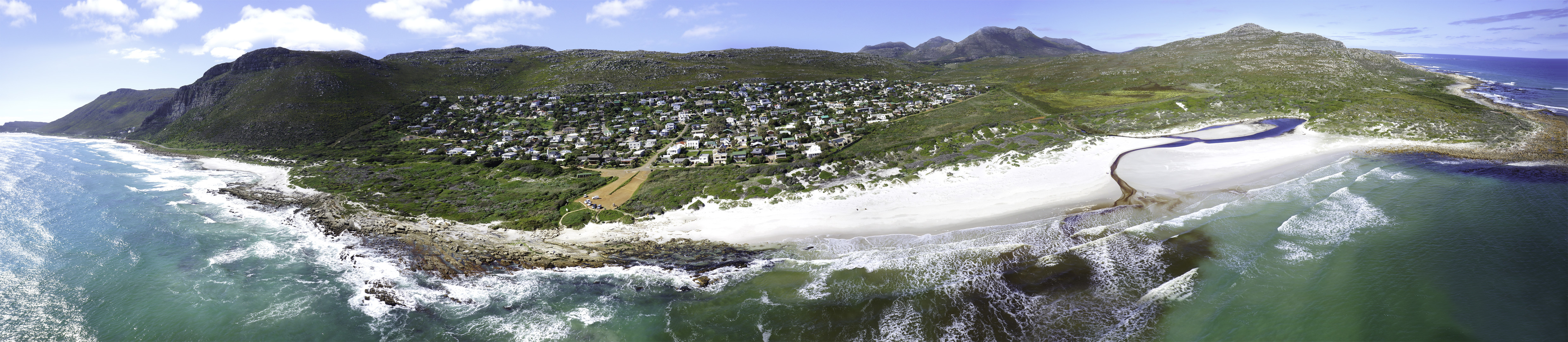
- An aerial view of Scarborough from the ocean.

- Location within Western Cape Location within South Africa
- Coordinates: 34°11′54″S 18°22′32″E
- Country: South Africa
- Province: Western Cape
- Municipality: City of Cape Town

Area
  - Total: 3.85 km^{2} (1.49 sq mi)

Population (2011)
  - Total: 1,075
  - Density: 279/km^{2} (723/sq mi)

Racial makeup (2011)
  - Black African: 16.2%
  - Coloured: 9.8%
  - Indian/Asian: 0.7%
  - White: 69.6%
  - Other: 3.8%

First languages (2011)
  - English: 68.2%
  - Afrikaans: 19.2%
  - Xhosa: 6.5%
  - Swazi: 1.5%
  - Other: 4.6%
- Time zone: UTC+2 (SAST)
- PO box: 7975

Scarborough is a seaside town situated within the City of Cape Town on the Cape Peninsula in the Western Cape province of South Africa, situated at the edge of the Cape Point Nature Reserve. The town's boundary includes Scarborough Beach, which is popular with surfers.

This town was designated as a conservation village in April 1996, defined as "a residential area of limited extent, surrounded by a conserved natural landscape, committed to reverse past environmental damage and to avoid future environmental impacts".
