= Swartklip =

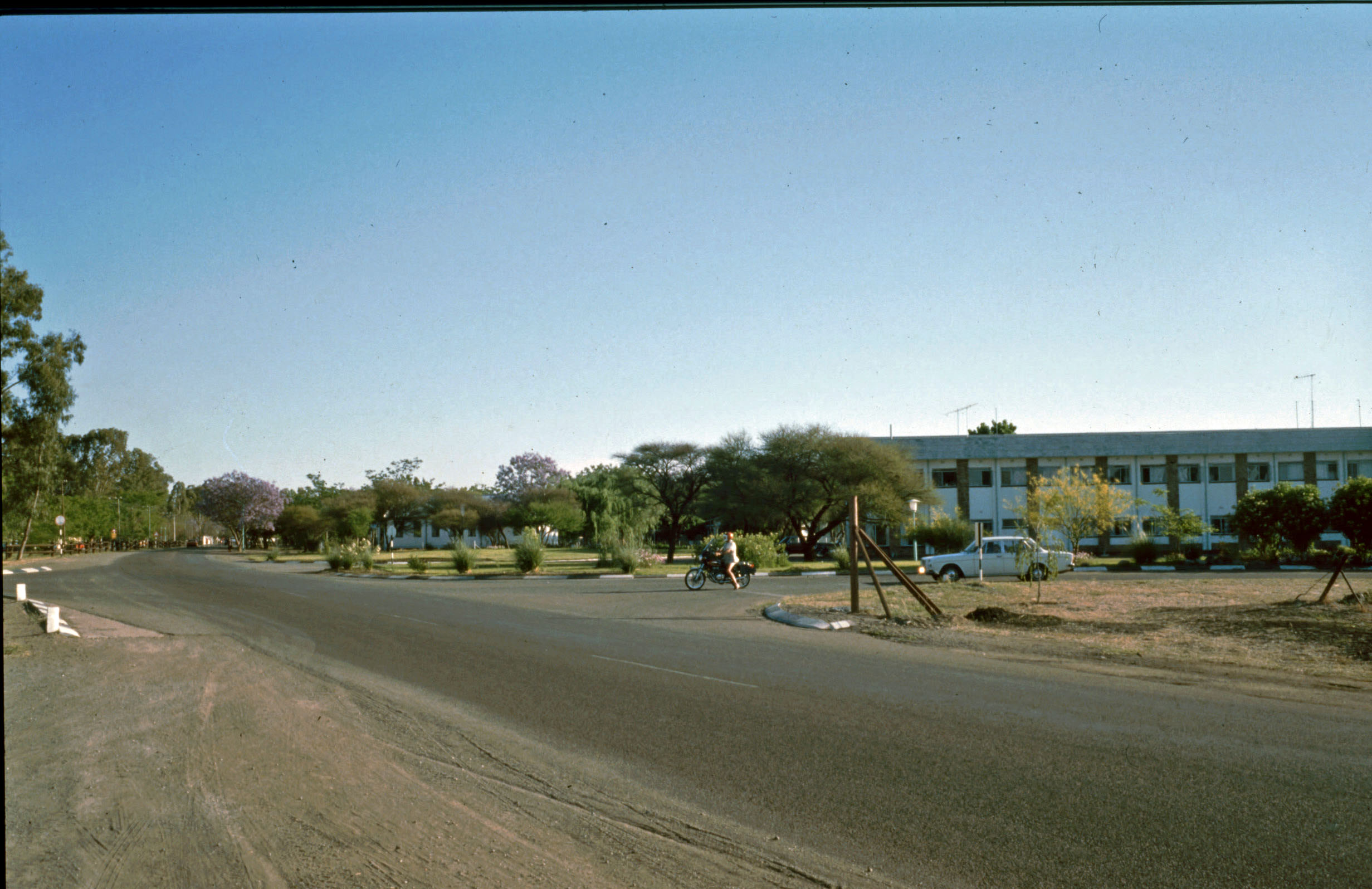
- Swartklip in 1980

- Location within Limpopo Location within South Africa
- Coordinates: 24.945°S 27.163°E
- Country: South Africa
- Province: Limpopo
- District: Waterberg
- Municipality: Thabazimbi

Area
  - Total: 22.31 km^{2} (8.61 sq mi)

Population (2011)
  - Total: 3,517
  - Density: 157.6/km^{2} (408.3/sq mi)

Racial makeup (2011)
  - Black African: 53.6%
  - Coloured: 1.5%
  - Indian/Asian: 0.3%
  - White: 44.5%
  - Other: 0.1%

First languages (2011)
  - Afrikaans: 46.5%
  - Tswana: 19.1%
  - English: 7.7%
  - Xhosa: 6.5%
  - Other: 20.1%
- Time zone: UTC+2 (SAST)
- Postal code (street): 0370
- PO box: 0370

Swartklip is a town in Waterberg District Municipality in the Limpopo province of South Africa.
