= Green laver =

Type of edible green seaweed

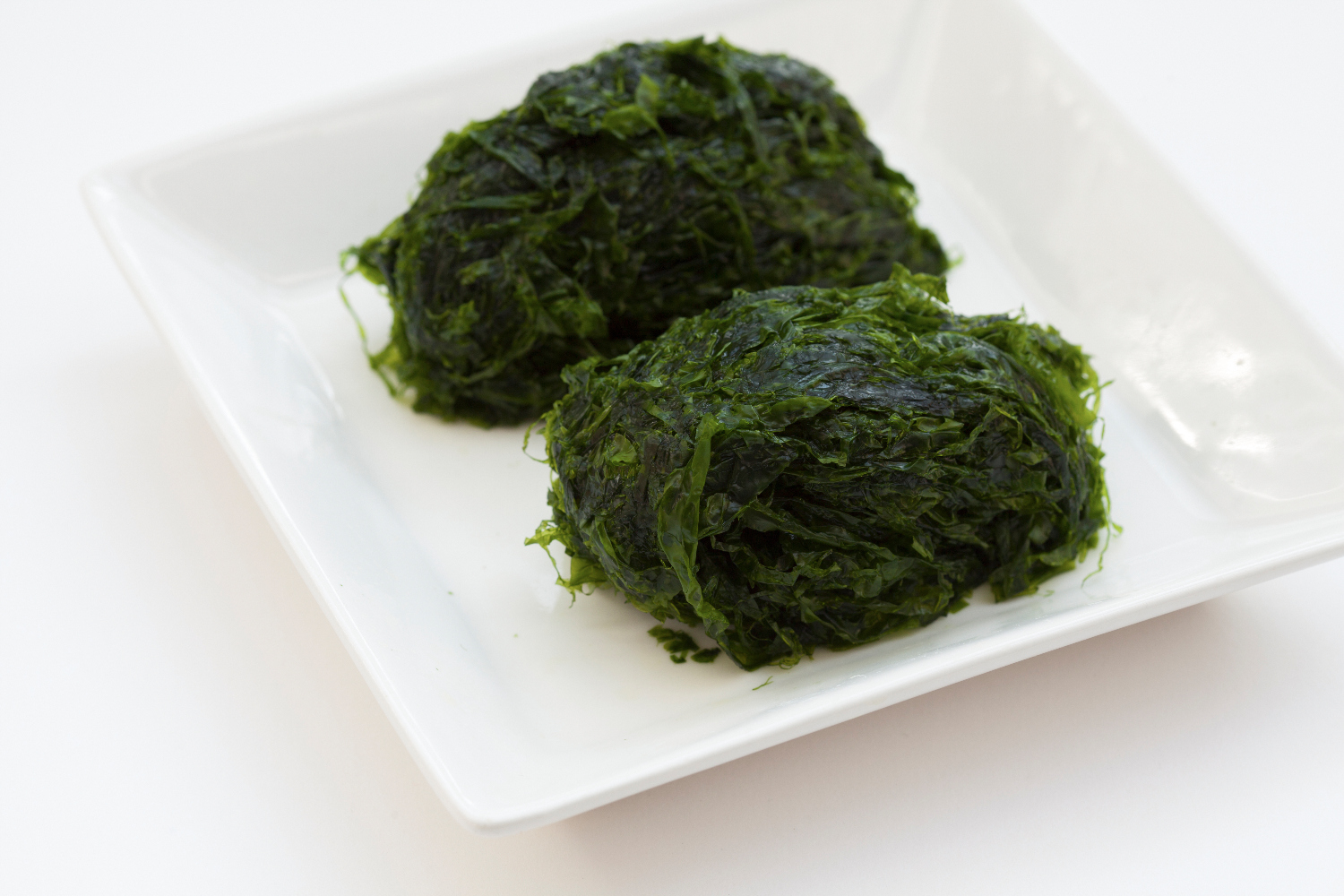
Raw parae (green laver)

Green laver (/ˈleɪvər, ˈlɑːvər/), known as aonori (アオノリ; 青海苔) in Japan, sea cabbage (海白菜) or hutai (滸苔) in China, and parae (파래) and kim (김) in Korean, is a type of edible green seaweed, including species from the genera Monostroma and Ulva (Ulva prolifera, Ulva pertusa, Ulva intestinalis). It is commercially cultivated in some bay areas in Japan, Korea, and Taiwan, such as Ise Bay. It is rich in minerals such as calcium, magnesium, lithium, vitamins, and amino acids such as methionine. It is also called aosa (アオサ, Ulva pertusa) in some places in Japan.

== Lifecycle research and cultivation ==
The life cycle of laver and related algae species was unknown until the 1940s when a British phycologist, Kathleen Drew-Baker, made the connection between Porphyra umbilicalis and a micro-plankton previously believed to be a separate species. In her research, Drew-Baker realized that the micro-plankton was, in fact, an early life stage of the Porphyra algae.

Prior to the 1960s, while laver had been farmed in Japan, Korea, and China since at least the 17th century, no formal method of cultivation for the algae was known. This changed after Drew-Baker's research on Porphyra was translated into Japanese and its insights were used as the basis for methods of artificial seeding techniques which had previously been impossible for farmers.

== Culinary use ==
=== Japan ===
It is used in its dried form for Japanese soups, tempura, and material for manufacturing dried nori and tsukudani and rice. It is also used in a powdered form, often blended with Ulva species of Ulvaceae as its production is limited.

It is used commonly for flavouring of some Japanese foods, usually by sprinkling the powder on the hot food, for its aroma:

- Fried noodles (yakisoba or yakiudon)
- Okonomiyaki (Japanese pancake)
- Takoyaki (octopus dumpling ball)
- Isobe age
- Isobe mochi
- Shichimi (seven-spice seasoning)
- Japanese potato chips
- Misoshiru
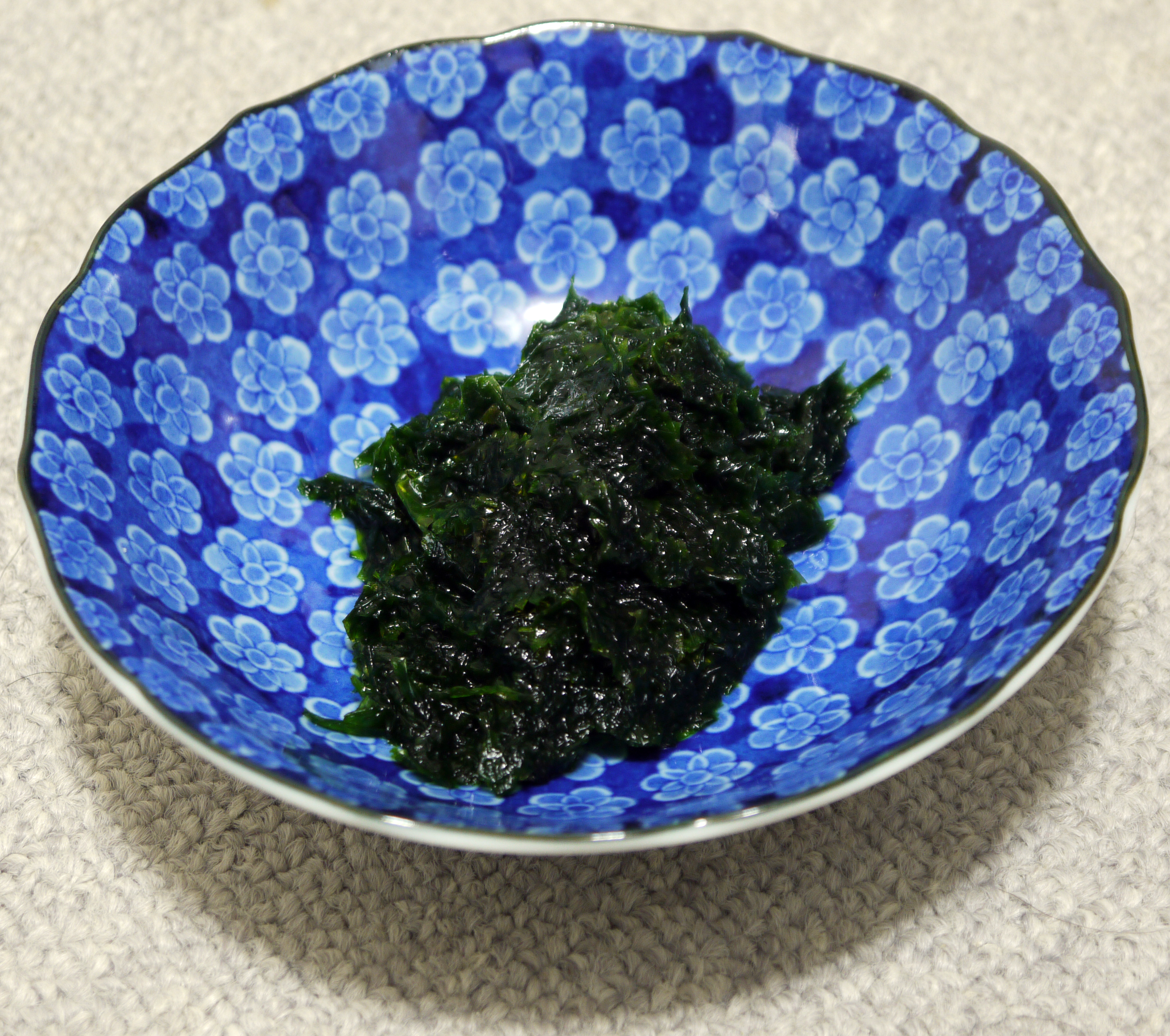
Raw aonori from Lake Hamana

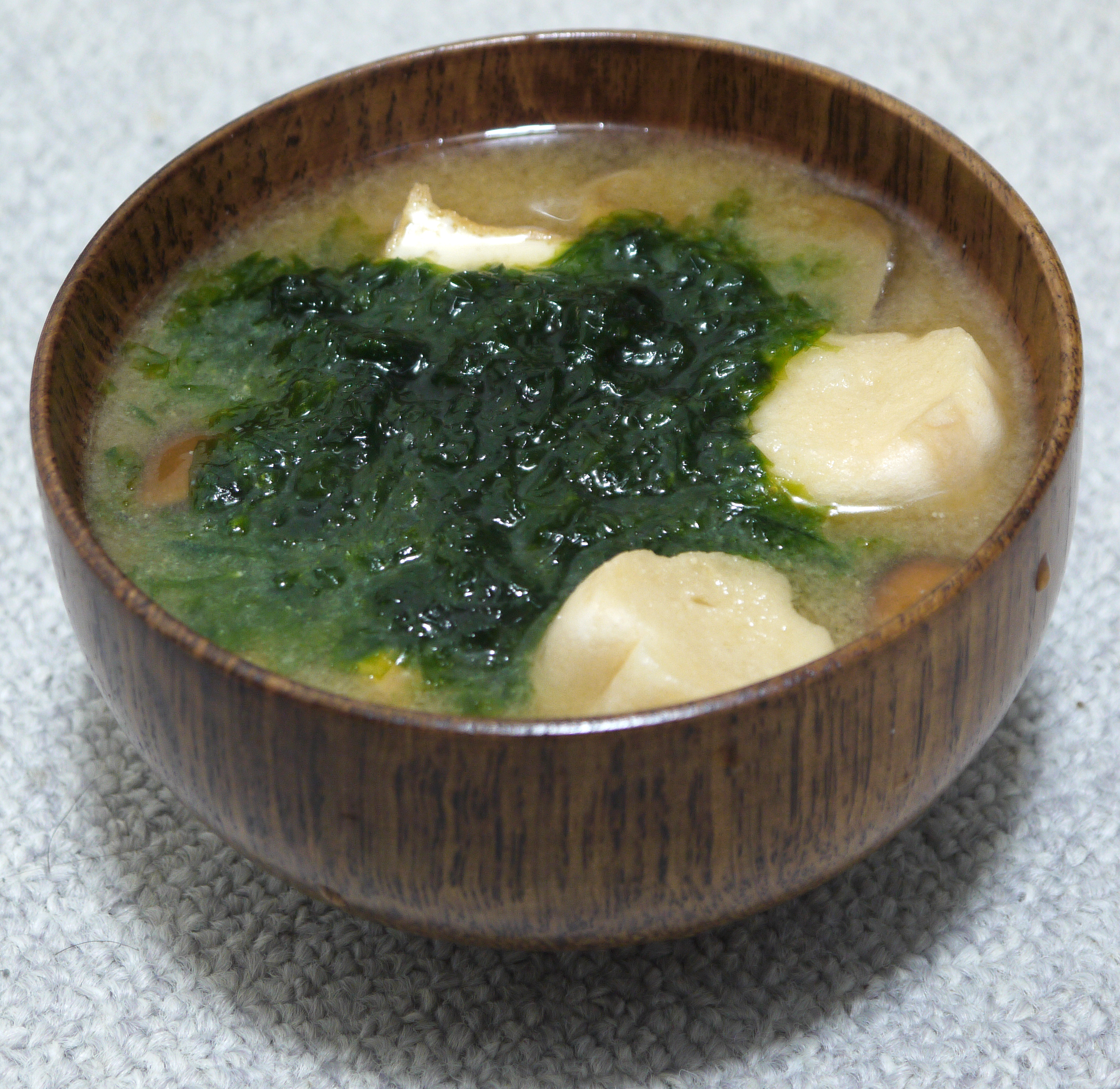
Miso soup with raw aonori

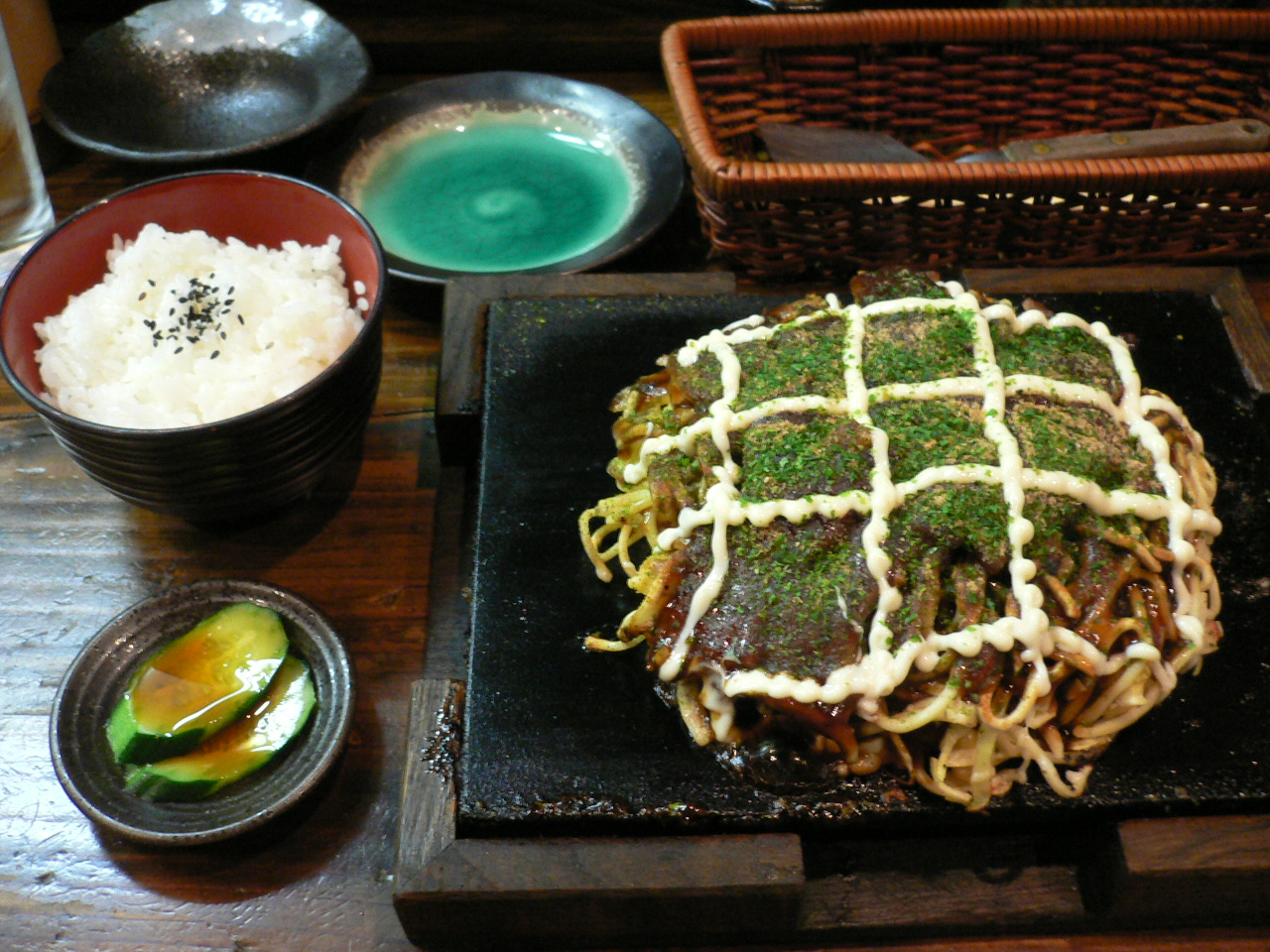
Okonomiyaki with aonori powder

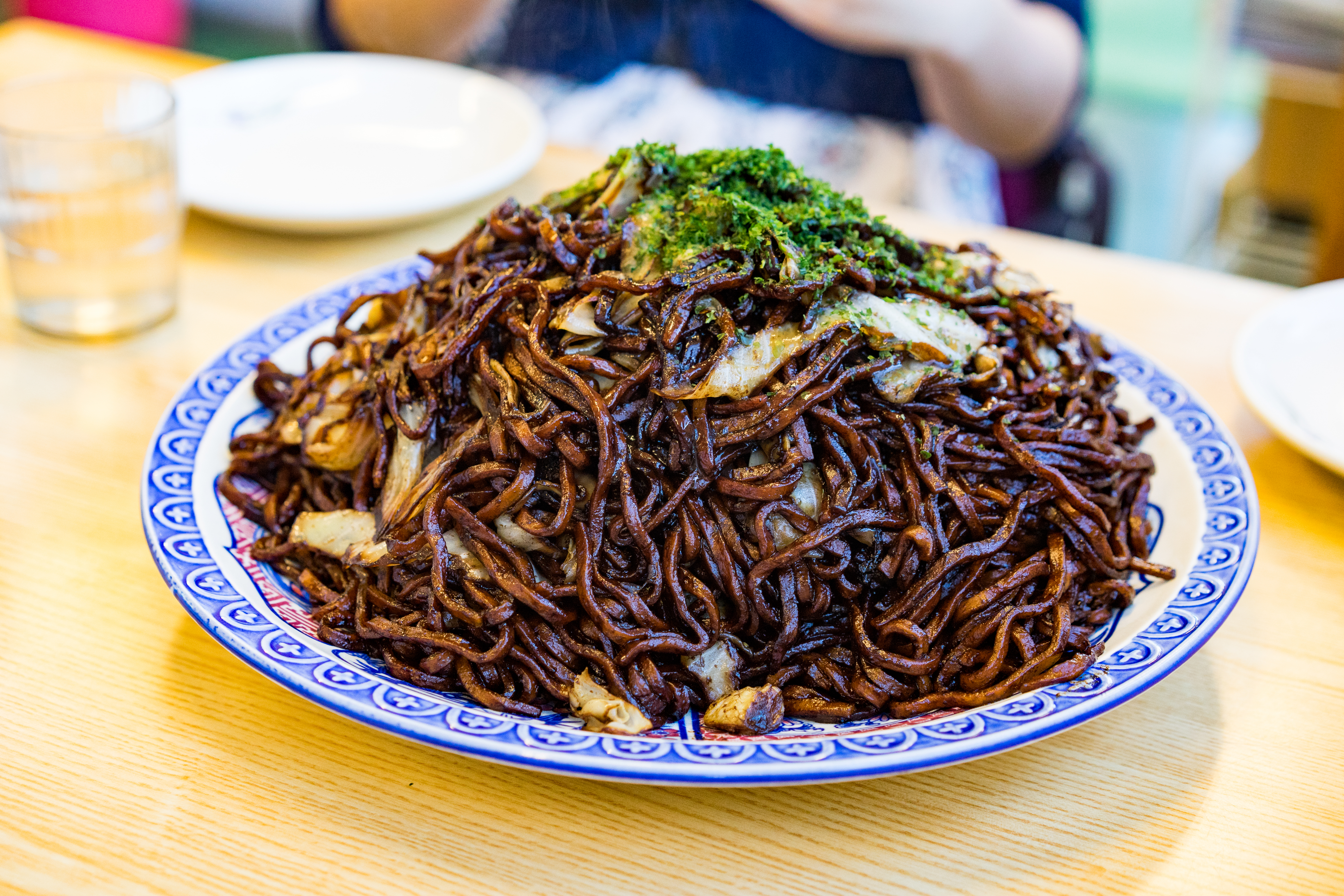
Yakisoba with aonori powder

=== Korea ===
In Korea, parae is eaten as a namul vegetable. It is also used to make gim (dried laver sheets).

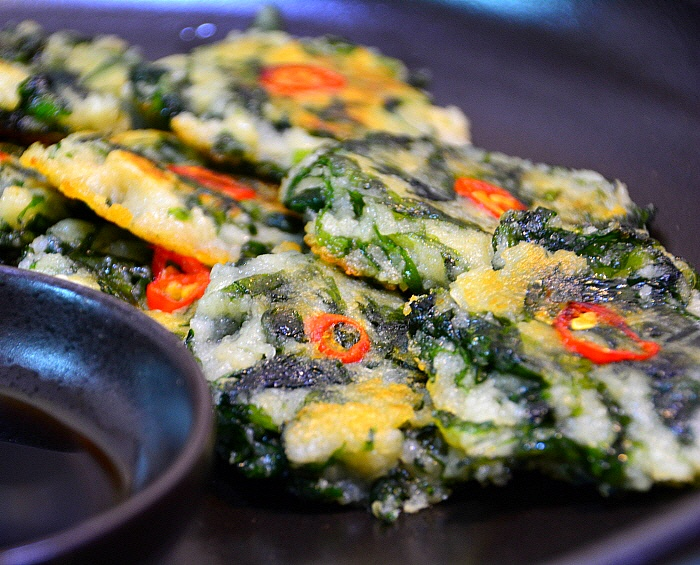
Parae-gamja-jeon (green laver potato pancake)

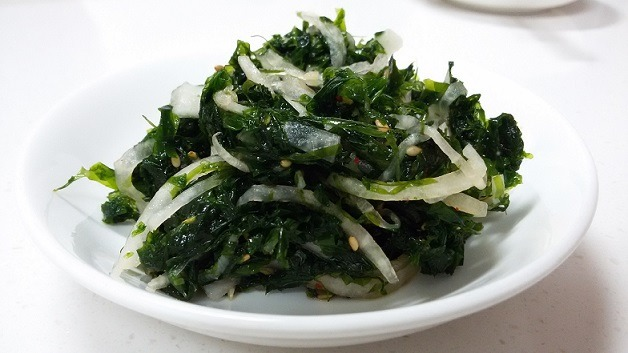
Parae-muchim (seasoned green laver)

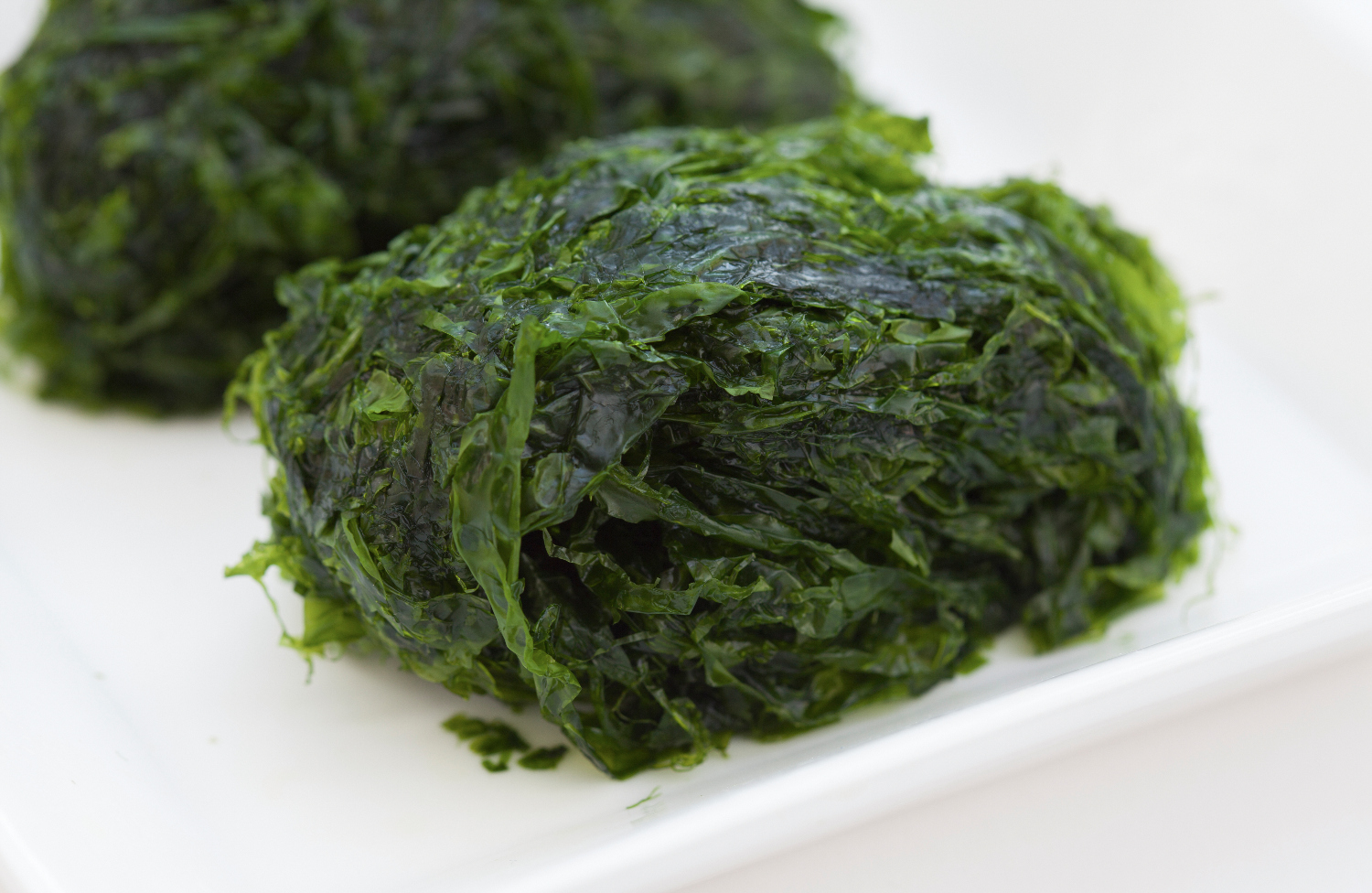

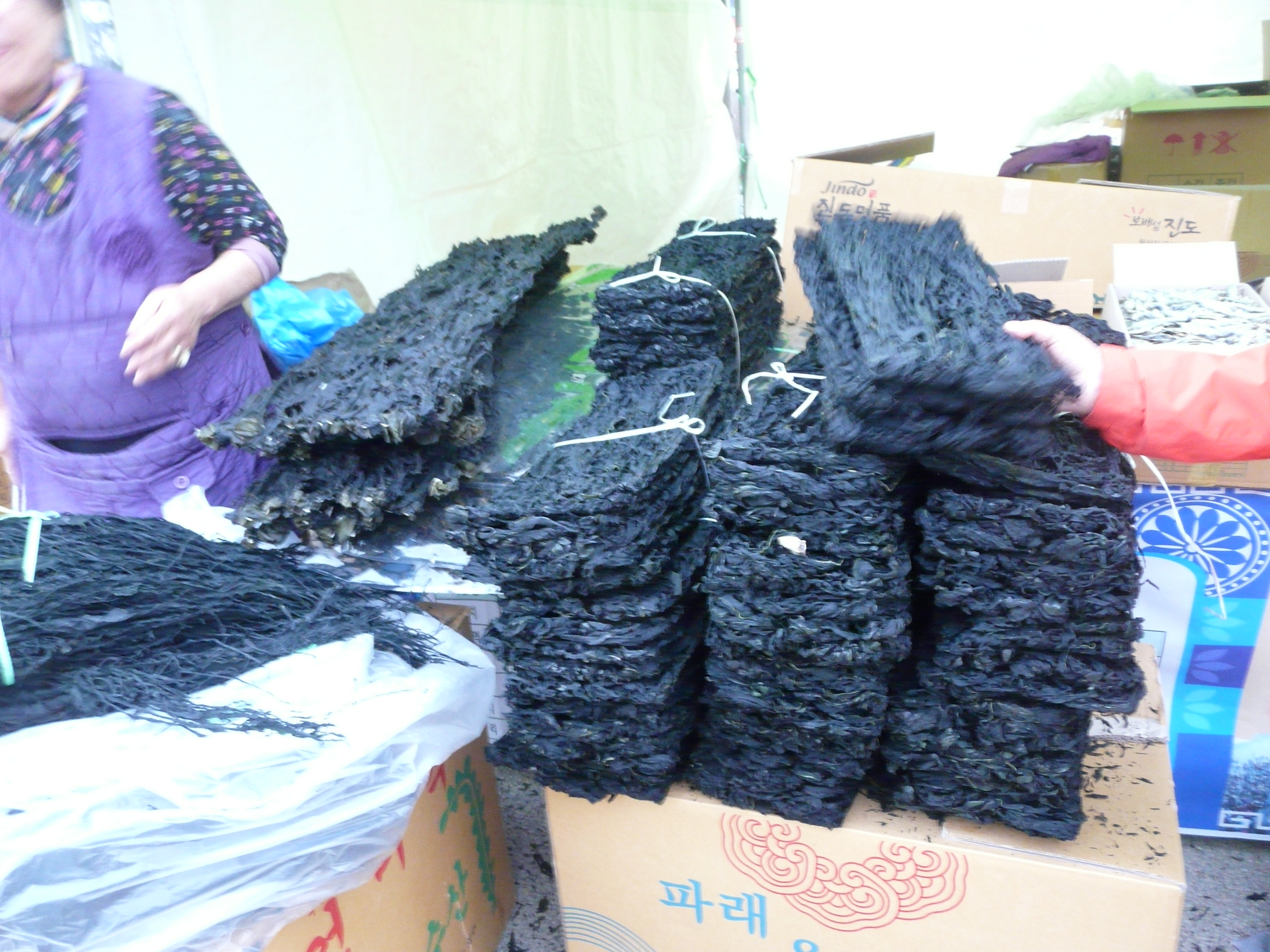
Dried green laver sheets

=== China ===
In parts of southern China, green laver is added to soups and traditional seafood dishes, especially in coastal regions.

== Similar species ==
Green laver shares the name "laver" with Porphyra umbilicalis, a red seaweed, which is harvested from the coasts of Scotland, Wales, and Ireland and used to prepare laverbread. Like "green laver", similar edible seaweeds with indigenous names translated as "laver", are found in many other countries around the world. In Hawaii, "the species Porphyra atropurpurea is considered a great delicacy, called Limu luau".

== See also ==
- Nori
- Gamet
- Seaweed
