= Ulva australis =

Scientific classification
- Domain: Eukaryota
- Supergroup: Archaeplastida
- Clade: Viridiplantae
- Division: Chlorophyta
- Class: Ulvophyceae
- Order: Ulvales
- Family: Ulvaceae
- Genus: Ulva
- Species: U. australis

Binomial name
- Ulva australis Areschoug, 1854

Species of alga

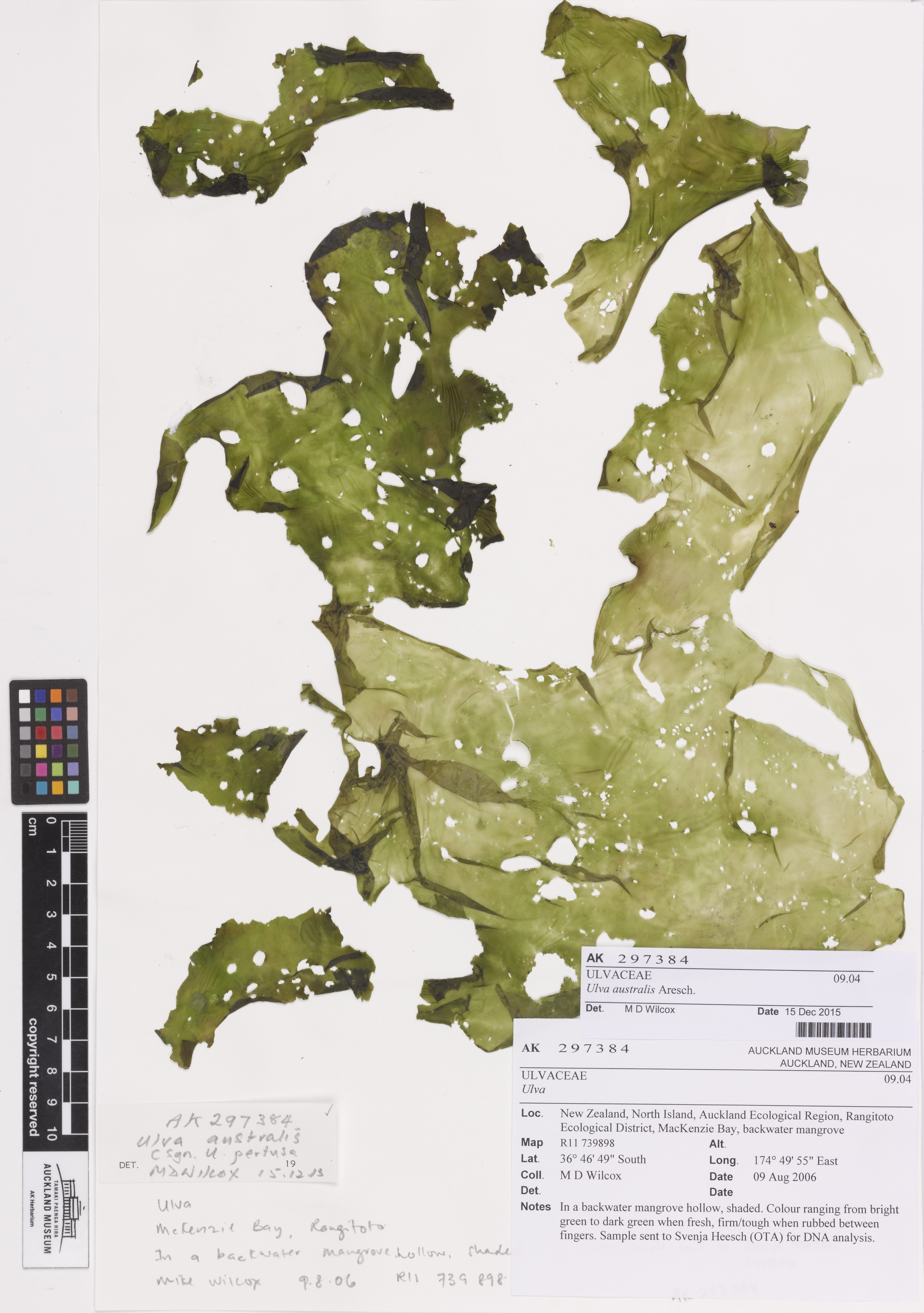
A sample of Ulva australis.

Ulva australis, the southern sea lettuce, is a species of bright green coloured seaweed in the family Ulvaceae that can be found in waters around Australia and was first described by Swedish botanist Johan Erhard Areschoug. It is an edible green algae, although sometimes designated as a seaweed. General characteristics of Ulva australis include a smooth surface, distromatic blades, lobed fronds, and thallus color from dark green to light grass green. It can be either free floating or attached by a single holdfast. Its cells appear to be irregularly arranged, have rounded edges, and have shapes such as rectilinear, square, and pentagonal.

It has been researched for a number of scientific properties in distinct fields such as environmental protection, medicine, and pharmacology. Ulva rigida has sometimes been confused with this species.

== Origin ==
The taxa of Ulva macro-algae are distributed worldwide, and because they have so few characters that are often different among the taxa members, they are known to be difficult to classify. Many Ulva members found near the Australia has been equated with species elsewhere in the world, and Ulva australis, first described from the samples Arechoug collected in Southern Australia, is one of them.

Once considered to be a temperate species, Ulva pertusa is one of the most common green algae in Japan that lives in the intertidal coast, and it is native to northeastern Asia. Upon studying the DNA fragments extracted from collected specimens, Ulva pertusa has almost identical DNA sequences, with very small sequence divergence when comparing with the reported genetic data from Australia. The researchers tested the hypothesis that U. australis is an independent species, but, the hypothesis was rejected due to U. australis' natural habitat along the shoreline being suppressed by the U. pertusa populations. Therefore, it can be concluded that the Ulva australis is a species introduced to Australia that originated in Japan. However, the researchers hypothesize that the U. australis was not directly introduced from Japan to Australia, but rather from non-indigenous populations elsewhere in northeastern Asia.

== Factors Affecting Growth ==
Researchers used a factorial experimental design to test the three factors that has influence on the growth of Ulva australis with two levels of each factor: Carbon dioxide (380 and 750 ppm), nutrient (control and PES medium), and irradiance (50 and 100 μmol photons m^{−2} s^{−1}). It was experimentally shown that the growth and photosynthesis of Ulva australis increases when the levels of carbon dioxide and nutrient are higher, i.e. 750 ppm and PES medium in the experiment. However, the optimal level for irradiance for their growth and photosynthesis differed among the three lives stages. The germlings favored higher level of irradiance, whereas the preferred lower level of irradiance.

== Application in Environmental Protection ==
Ulva australis has the ability to participate in environmental protection. Human activities has released metals into the sea, and when these metals exceed the standard, they will cause metal pollution. Measuring and removing these pollutants has always been a problem. When Ulva australis are in the sea area with serious metal pollution, the metal ions in their cell walls and vacuoles will increase, which indicates that they can absorb metals in the ocean. In addition, the research results also show that compared with other metals, they have stronger absorption capacity for zinc. The results indicate that the metal pollution of a given area could be known by transplanting Ulva australis into the polluted area and measuring the metal ion content in its cell wall and vacuole. Moreover, Ulva australis can also be used as biological tools to remove metal pollution. The metal absorption capacity of Ulva australis has an upper limit, and excessive metal pollution will damage their thallus, thus it is necessary to replace Ulva australis regularly during use.

== Application in Biotechnology ==
Ulva australis, as an edible seaweed, is very rich in minerals, vitamins, and noncaloric dietary fiber, and has many uses in medical and biotechnological fields. The decoction of U. australis can be used to treat several illness such as hyperlipidemia, sunstroke, and urinary diseases. Several biological activities such as anti-hyperlipidemic, antioxidant, antiviral, immunomodulatory, and anti-radiation activities were all observed from the algal sulfated polysaccharides they have. The organic extracts of Ulva australis also show different many other biological activities, such as radical scavenging activity (RSA) and metal chelating activity. Moreover, Ulva australis also shows inhibitory effects on the pathogenic factors of Alzheimer's disease, hyperpigmentation, Type-2 diabetes mellitus and skin sagging. This shows that Ulva australis as a common food source can be used to treat, prevent or alleviate a variety of diseases.

== Application in abalone breeding ==
Research shows that Ulva australis can play a great role in abalone aquaculture: improve the survival rate of abalone, and reduce the cost of abalone farming. Abalone is widely known as an expensive seafood with large demand. However, the utilization rate of Undaria pinnatifida as its feed is not high in winter and it will lead to unbalanced nutrition, which not only reduces the survival rate of abalone, but also increases the cost of aquaculture. Therefore, some researchers use Ulva australis instead of Undaria pinnatifida as abalone feed to experiment, to observe whether Ulva australis can be used as an effective abalone feed. The results showed that when 60% Ulva australis and 40% Undaria pinnatifida were used to feed abalone, the survival rate and abundance of abalone reached the maximum. Moreover, even if abalone is completely fed with Ulva australis instead of Undaria pinnatifida, abalone will not be negatively affected.

== Problems caused by Ulva australis and possible solutions ==
Green tide, a phenomenon of excessive green algae in a certain area, is mainly caused by Ulva spp. In Jeju Island and its coastal areas of South Korea, Ulva australis, a specie of Ulva spp., has caused serious ecological and marine pollution. Therefore, it is imminent to resolve the issue. Some researchers have carried out experiments with different control measures and found that the reproductive capacity of Ulva australis in low salinity water is inhibited. Moreover, lower pH value and temperature higher than 30 °C will also cause serious damage to Ulva australis. In addition, the researchers also pointed out that oxidants such as hydrogen peroxide and sodium percarbonate can cause the rapid death of Ulva australis, thus these chemicals can be used to control the green tide caused by Ulva australis.

== See also ==
- Ulva compressa
- List of seaweeds and marine flowering plants of Australia (temperate waters)
