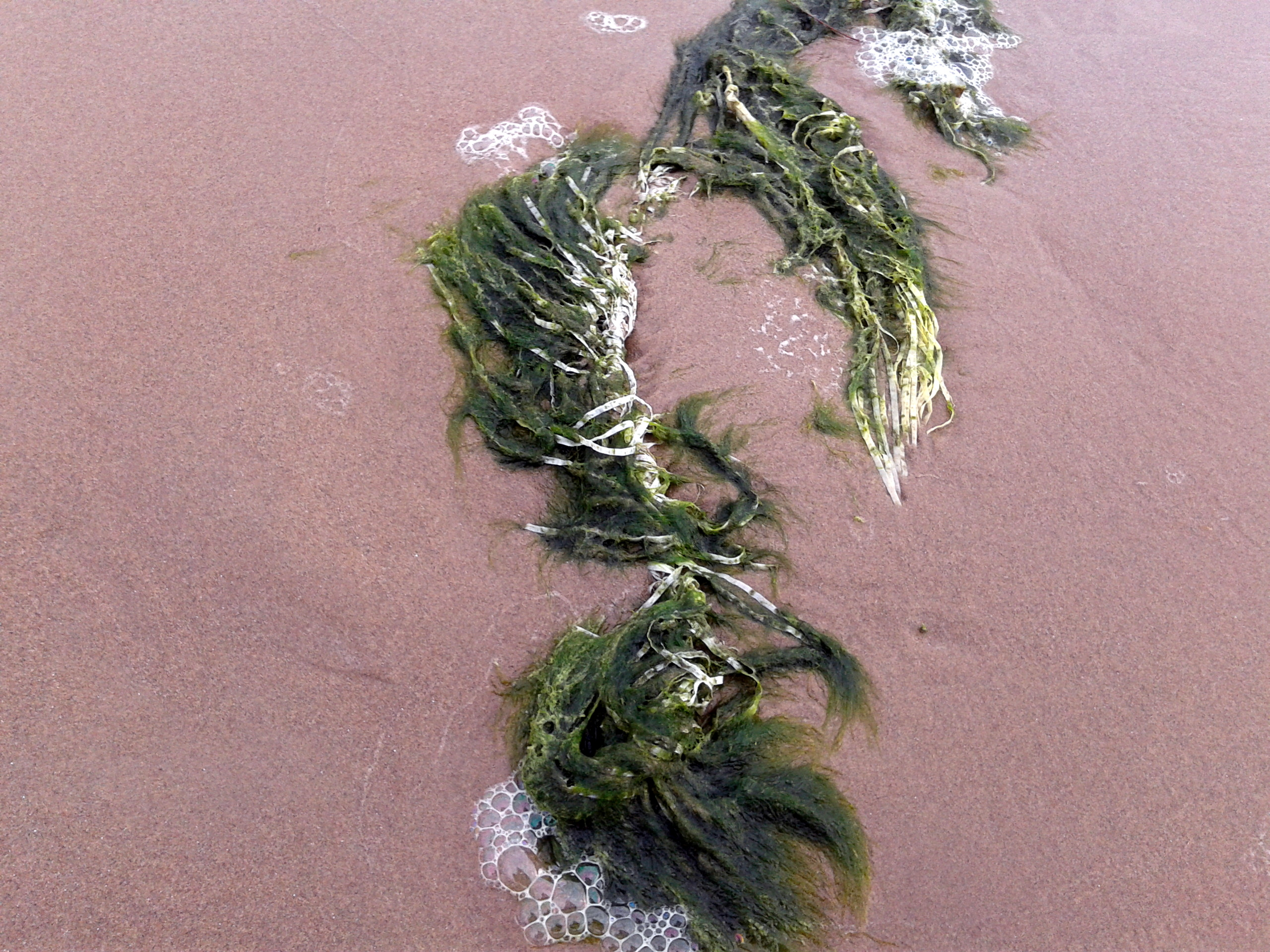

Scientific classification
- Clade: Viridiplantae
- Division: Chlorophyta
- Class: Ulvophyceae
- Order: Ulvales
- Family: Ulvaceae
- Genus: Ulva
- Species: U. paschima

Binomial name
- Ulva paschima Bast, 2014

= Ulva paschima =

Species of seaweed

Ulva paschima is a green alga in the family Ulvaceae, a green seaweed endemic to the West Coast of India. The species was identified in 2014 based on molecular phylogenetics using ITS sequences as belonging to the “Paschima” clade.

== Description ==
The fronds are erect, filamentous, and grass-green in color, 5 cm-40 cm in length, mostly unbranched, tubular, with some parts of the thalli compressed like flat ribbons. The tufts of filamentous thalli are attached to the substrate by rhizoids. Thalli from low-saline environments are branched, while that exposed to the ocean are non-branched. Cells are more or less quadrilateral; some have linear cell arrangement. Parietal chloroplasts have more than two pyrenoids per cell.

== Distribution ==
The distribution is endemic to Indian West Coast.

== Ecology ==
The species is found in intertidal rocks of saline and estuarine environments with various seawater salinities (35 to 24 PSU).

== Life history ==
The sporangial and gametangial thalli are morphologically alike. The diploid adult plant produces haploid zoospores by meiosis; these settle and grow to form haploid male and female plants similar to the diploid plants. When these haploid plants release gametes they unite to produce the zygote which germinates, and grows to produce the diploid plant.
