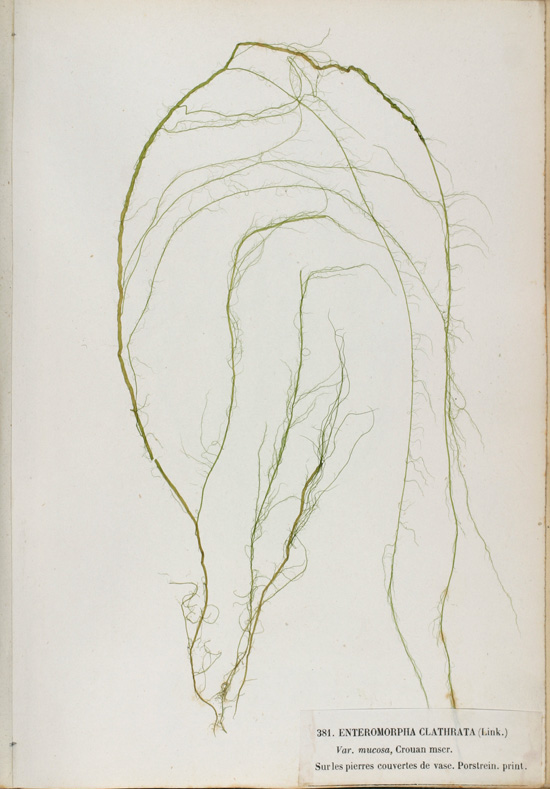
- Ulva clathrata

Scientific classification
- Kingdom: Plantae
- Division: Chlorophyta
- Class: Ulvophyceae
- Order: Ulvales
- Family: Ulvaceae
- Genus: Ulva
- Species: U. clathrata

Binomial name
- Ulva clathrata (Roth) C.Agardh, 1811

Synonyms
- Enteromorpha clathrata (Roth) Greville, 1830; Enteromorpha clathrata var. crinita (Nees) Hauck, 1884; Enteromorpha crinita Nees, 1820; Enteromorpha gelatinosa Kützing, 1849; Enteromorpha muscoides (Clemente) Cremades, 1990; Enteromorpha ramulosa (Smith) Carmichael, 1833; Ulva muscoides Clemente, 1807; Ulva ramulosa Smith, 1810

= Ulva clathrata =

Species of alga

Ulva clathrata is a species of seaweed in the family Ulvaceae that can be found in such European countries as Azores, Belgium, Ireland, Netherlands, and the United Kingdom. It is also common in Asian and African countries such as Israel, Kenya, Mauritius, South Africa, Tanzania, Japan, Portugal and Tunisia. It has distribution in the Americas as well including Alaska, Argentina, Brazil, Cuba, Grenada, Hispaniola, and Venezuela. Besides various countries it can be found in certain gulfs, oceans and seas such as the Gulf of Maine and Gulf of Mexico, Indian Ocean and European waters (including Mediterranean Sea).

== Description ==
The plant is light green in colour and is 20–80 millimetres (0.79–3.15 in) in height. The thin cylindrical threads are 1–3 millimetres (0.039–0.118 in) in width.

== Uses ==
It is used in biochemistry, since it has 20-26% content of protein, 32-36% of which are crude proteins. The plant also contains glucose (10–16%), rhamnose (36–40%), uronic acids (27–29%), and xylose (10–13%).

== In other languages ==
The species is also known by this names in other countries:

- Danish: Fin rørhinde
- Norwegian: Buskgrønske
- Polish: Sałata, Polish: Taśma or Polish: Watka
- Spanish: Alga verde
