= Ulva bifrons =

Scientific classification
- Kingdom: Plantae
- Division: Chlorophyta
- Class: Ulvophyceae
- Order: Ulvales
- Family: Ulvaceae
- Genus: Ulva
- Species: U. bifrons

Binomial name
- Ulva bifrons Ardré, 1967

Species of alga

Ulva bifrons is a species of blackish-green coloured seaweed in the family Ulvaceae that can be found in Sezimbra, Portugal, in France and Spain, and Balearic Islands.
