= Ulva profunda =

Scientific classification
- Kingdom: Plantae
- Division: Chlorophyta
- Class: Ulvophyceae
- Order: Ulvales
- Family: Ulvaceae
- Genus: Ulva
- Species: U. profunda

Binomial name
- Ulva profunda W. R. Taylor, 1928

Species of seaweed

Ulva profunda is a species of seaweed in the family Ulvaceae that can be found in US state of Florida, India, and the island of Mauritius.
