= Ulva hookeriana =

Scientific classification
- Kingdom: Plantae
- Division: Chlorophyta
- Class: Ulvophyceae
- Order: Ulvales
- Family: Ulvaceae
- Genus: Ulva
- Species: U. hookeriana

Binomial name
- Ulva hookeriana (Kützing) H.S.Hayden, Blomster, Maggs, P.C.Silva, Stanhope & Waaland, 2003

Synonyms
- Enteromorpha hookeriana Kützing, 1849; Enteromorpha bulbosa (Suhr) Montagne, 1846; Ulva bulbosa (Suhr) Hariot, 1889

Species of alga

Ulva hookeriana is a species of green algae in the family Ulvaceae. Based on preliminary data, this species may have high antioxidant potential.
