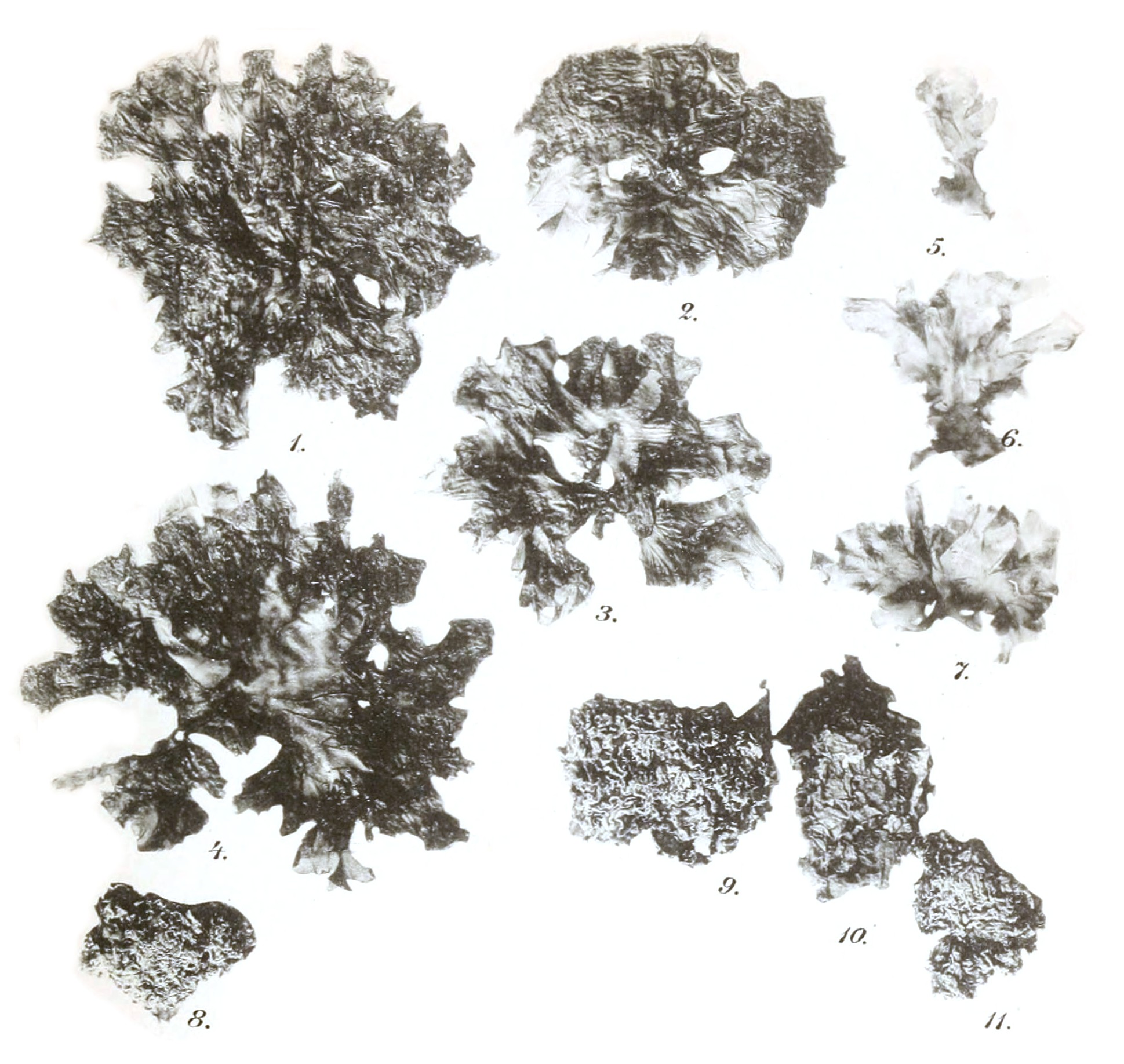

Scientific classification
- Kingdom: Plantae
- Division: Chlorophyta
- Class: Ulvophyceae
- Order: Ulvales
- Family: Ulvaceae
- Genus: Ulva
- Species: U. conglobata

Binomial name
- Ulva conglobata Kjellman, 1897

= Ulva conglobata =

Species of alga

Ulva conglobata is a species of seaweed in the family Ulvaceae that can be found on Jeju Island of Korea, Qingdao province of China and Yokohama, Japan.

== Description ==
It is 10 centimetres (3.9 in) in length with rounded edges that are 9–16 micrometres (0.00035–0.00063 in) long and are 7–12 micrometres (0.00028–0.00047 in) wide. Its base is made up of 2 lines of cells which are 50 centimetres (20 in) in length. Its sides are 34–39 micrometres (0.0013–0.0015 in) while the bottom is 38–50 micrometres (0.0015–0.0020 in).

== Uses ==
Its methanol extract is used to treat Alzheimer's disease while its ethanol have polysaccharides which contains 23.04-35.20% of sulfate ester with 10.82-14.91% of uronic acid, and 3.82-451% of protein. It also produces crude enzyme when its mixed with linoleic acid which is widely used to fight influenza.
