= Ulva acanthophora =

Scientific classification
- Kingdom: Plantae
- Division: Chlorophyta
- Class: Ulvophyceae
- Order: Ulvales
- Family: Ulvaceae
- Genus: Ulva
- Species: U. acanthophora

Binomial name
- Ulva acanthophora (Kützing) Hayden, Blomster, Maggs, P.C. Silva, Stanhope & J.R. Waaland, 2003

Synonyms
- Enteromorpha acanthophora Kützing, 1849; Enteromorpha ramulosa var. acanthophora (Kützing) V.J.Chapman, 1956

Species of alga

Ulva acanthophora is a species of benthic subtropical seaweed in the Ulvaceae family that can be found in California and Mexico.
