= Ulva elegans =

Scientific classification
- Clade: Viridiplantae
- Division: Chlorophyta
- Class: Ulvophyceae
- Order: Ulvales
- Family: Ulvaceae
- Genus: Ulva
- Species: U. elegans

Binomial name
- Ulva elegans Gayral, 1960

Species of alga

Ulva elegans is a species of seaweed in the family Ulvaceae that is endemic to Morocco.

== Name ==
The name of the species comes from Latin meaning elegant.
