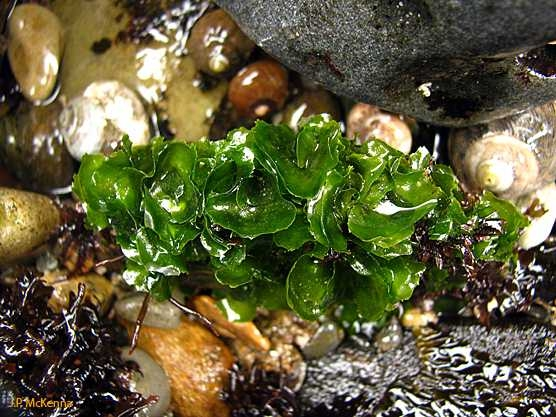

Scientific classification
- Kingdom: Plantae
- Division: Chlorophyta
- Class: Ulvophyceae
- Order: Ulvales
- Family: Ulvaceae
- Genus: Ulva
- Species: U. californica

Binomial name
- Ulva californica Wille, 1899

Synonyms
- Ulva angusta Setchell et Gardner; Enteromorpha angusta (Setchell et Gardner) Doty; Ulva scagelii Chihara

= Ulva californica =

Species of alga

Ulva californica is a species of seaweed, a green alga in the family Ulvaceae, the sea lettuces. This species is found from Alaska to California.
