= Ulva grandis =

Scientific classification
- Clade: Viridiplantae
- Division: Chlorophyta
- Class: Ulvophyceae
- Order: Ulvales
- Family: Ulvaceae
- Genus: Ulva
- Species: U. grandis

Binomial name
- Ulva grandis Saifullah & Nizamuddin, 1977

Species of alga

Ulva grandis is a species of seaweed in the family Ulvaceae that is endemic to Kiamari, Pakistan. The name comes from Latin meaning large.
