= Ulva atroviridis =

Scientific classification
- Kingdom: Plantae
- Division: Chlorophyta
- Class: Ulvophyceae
- Order: Ulvales
- Family: Ulvaceae
- Genus: Ulva
- Species: U. atroviridis

Binomial name
- Ulva atroviridis Levring, 1938

Synonyms
- Enteromorpha atroviridis (Levring) M.J.Wynne, 1986

Species of alga

Ulva atroviridis is a species of blackish-green coloured seaweed in the family Ulvaceae that can be found in Port Nolloth of Cape Province in South Africa and in Namibia.
