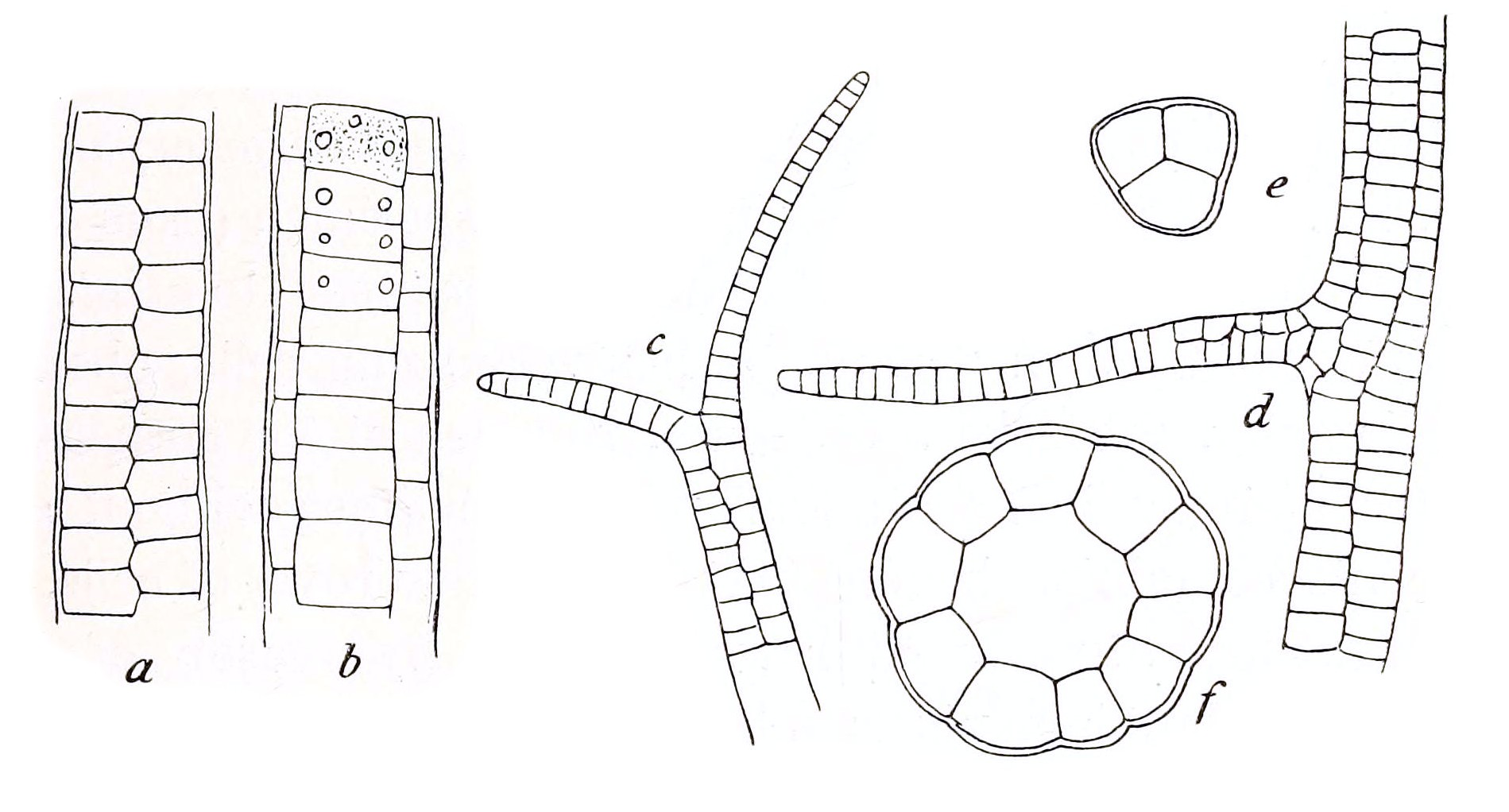

Scientific classification
- Kingdom: Plantae
- Division: Chlorophyta
- Class: Ulvophyceae
- Order: Ulvales
- Family: Ulvaceae
- Genus: Ulva
- Species: U. chaetomorphoides

Binomial name
- Ulva chaetomorphoides (Børgesen) Hayden, Blomster, Maggs, P.C.Silva, M.J.Stanhope & J.R.Waaland, 2003

Synonyms
- Enteromorpha chaetomorphoides Børgesen, 1911

= Ulva chaetomorphoides =

Species of alga

Ulva chaetomorphoides is a species of tropical and benthic seaweed in Ulvaceae family that can be found in Gulf of Mexico and European waters.
