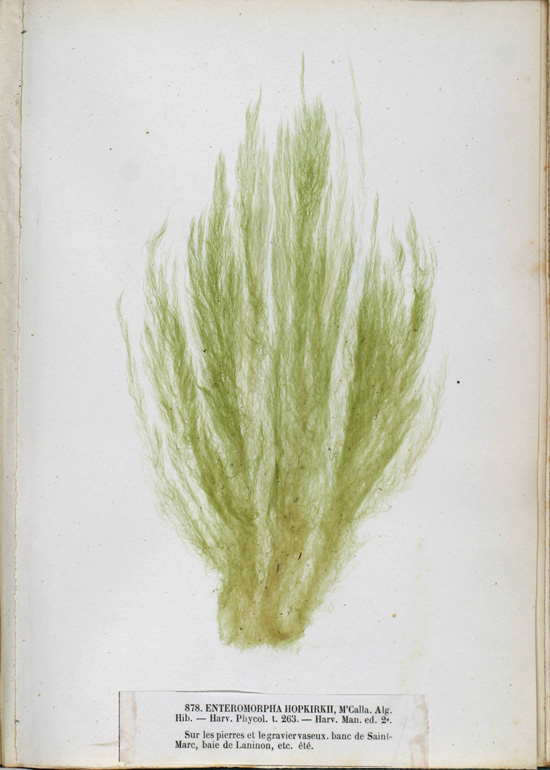

Scientific classification
- Clade: Viridiplantae
- Division: Chlorophyta
- Class: Ulvophyceae
- Order: Ulvales
- Family: Ulvaceae
- Genus: Ulva
- Species: U. flexuosa

Binomial name
- Ulva flexuosa Wulfen, 1803

= Ulva flexuosa =

Species of alga

Ulva flexuosa now generally referred to as Enteromorpha flexuosa (Wulfen ex Roth) J. Agardh). is a species of seaweed in Ulvaceae family that can be found worldwide.

== Description ==
This large green alga may grow to 25 cm, it is tubular and similar to E. prolifera. It is very variable with branches showing cells in longitudinal and sometimes also in transverse rows.

== Distribution ==
=== Europe ===
The species can be found in such European countries as Ireland, Belgium, Bulgaria, France, Greece, Italy, Portugal, Romania, Slovenia, Spain, Sweden, Great Britain (Scotland), and on island of Corsica.

=== Africa ===
In Africa it can be found in Algeria, Cameroon, Egypt, Gabon, Guinea, Equatorial Guinea, Eritrea, Ethiopia, Liberia, Namibia, Nigeria, Senegal, Sierra Leone, Somalia, South Africa, Togo, Tunisia, and on the islands such as Canary Islands, Madagascar, Mauritius and São Tomé and Príncipe.

=== Asia ===
In Asia, it is found in Bahrain, China, India, Iran, Kuwait, Pakistan, Saudi Arabia, Taiwan and Yemen.

=== Americas ===
It is also have North and South American distribution, which includes countries such as Argentina, Brazil, Chile, Ecuador, Mexico, Uruguay and Venezuela. In Central America it can be found in such countries as Belize, Costa Rica, and Panama, while in Caribbean it can be found on Bahamas, Barbados, Cuba, Hispaniola, Jamaica, Martinique, Tobago, Virgin Islands, and on Lesser and Netherlands Antilles.

The species is distributed throughout the US states such as California, Florida, Mississippi, North Carolina, Oregon, Texas, and Washington.
