= Ulva polyclada =

Scientific classification
- Kingdom: Plantae
- Division: Chlorophyta
- Class: Ulvophyceae
- Order: Ulvales
- Family: Ulvaceae
- Genus: Ulva
- Species: U. polyclada

Binomial name
- Ulva polyclada Kraft, 2007

Synonyms
- Enteromorpha multiramosa Bliding, 1960; Ulva multiramosa Taskin, 2012

Species of alga

Ulva polyclada is a species of seaweed in the family Ulvaceae that can be found in Australia and New Zealand.
