= Ulva burmanica =

Scientific classification
- Clade: Viridiplantae
- Division: Chlorophyta
- Class: Ulvophyceae
- Order: Ulvales
- Family: Ulvaceae
- Genus: Ulva
- Species: U. burmanica

Binomial name
- Ulva burmanica (Zeller) De Toni, 1889

Synonyms
- Phycoseris burmanica Zeller, 1873

Species of alga

Ulva burmanica is a species of seaweed in Ulvaceae family that can be found in Pegu, Burma.
