= Ulva anandii =

Scientific classification
- Clade: Viridiplantae
- Division: Chlorophyta
- Class: Ulvophyceae
- Order: Ulvales
- Family: Ulvaceae
- Genus: Ulva
- Species: U. anandii

Binomial name
- Ulva anandii Amjad & Shameel, 1993

Synonyms
- Ulva indica P.Anand, 1940

Species of alga

Ulva anandii is a species of seaweed in Ulvaceae family that can be found in Buleji and Karachi districts of Pakistan.
