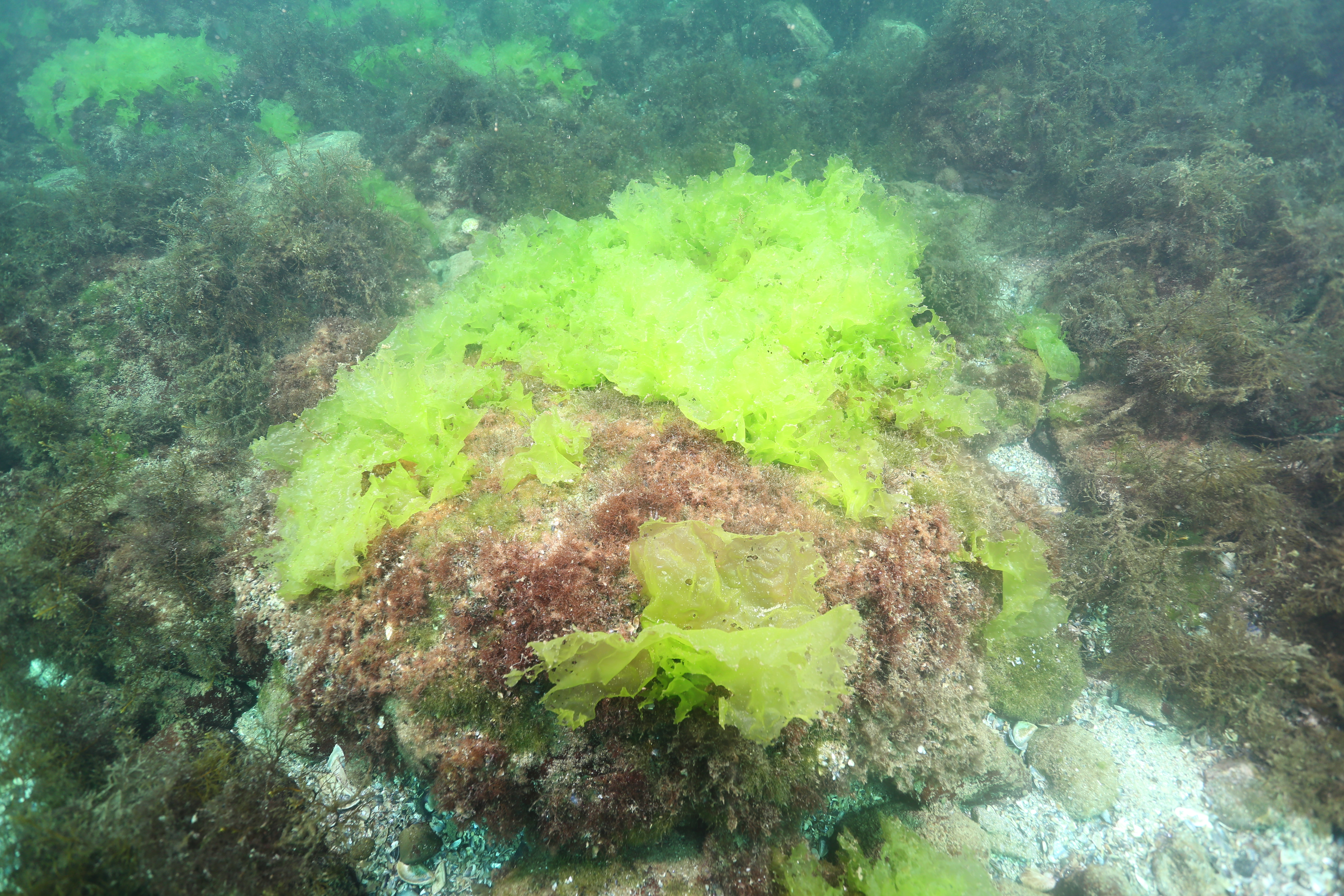

Scientific classification
- Clade: Viridiplantae
- Division: Chlorophyta
- Class: Ulvophyceae
- Order: Ulvales
- Family: Ulvaceae
- Genus: Ulva
- Species: U. rigida

Binomial name
- Ulva rigida (C. Agardh, 1823)

Synonyms
- Homotypic: Phycoseris rigida (C. Agardh), Kützing 1843; Ulva lactuca var. rigida (C. Agardh), Le Jolis, 1863; Heterotypic: Phycoseris ulva Sonder, 1845; Phycoseris gigantea Kützing, 1849; Ulva thuretti B.Föyn, 1955; Letterstedtia petiolata J.Agardh, 1883

= Ulva rigida =

Species of alga

Ulva rigida is a species of green algae in the family Ulvaceae. The species prefers eutrophic environments.
