= Ulva brevistipita =

Scientific classification
- Kingdom: Plantae
- Division: Chlorophyta
- Class: Ulvophyceae
- Order: Ulvales
- Family: Ulvaceae
- Genus: Ulva
- Species: U. brevistipita

Binomial name
- Ulva brevistipita V. J. Chapman, 1956

Species of alga

Ulva brevistipita is a species of blackish-green coloured seaweed in the family Ulvaceae that can be found in Australia and New Zealand.
