= Ulva ohnoi =

Scientific classification
- Clade: Viridiplantae
- Division: Chlorophyta
- Class: Ulvophyceae
- Order: Ulvales
- Family: Ulvaceae
- Genus: Ulva
- Species: U. ohnoi

Binomial name
- Ulva ohnoi Hiraoka & Shimada, 2004

Species of alga

Ulva ohnoi is a species of light-green coloured seaweed in the family Ulvaceae that is endemic to Japan.

== Description ==
It is 2 centimetres (0.79 in) wide while its thallus is 20–30 centimetres (7.9–11.8 in) high and is expanded. Its tiny serrations are 30–55 micrometres (0.0012–0.0022 in) and are thick in the upper and middle regions where they can be 80–90 micrometres (0.0031–0.0035 in) thick on the bottom.
