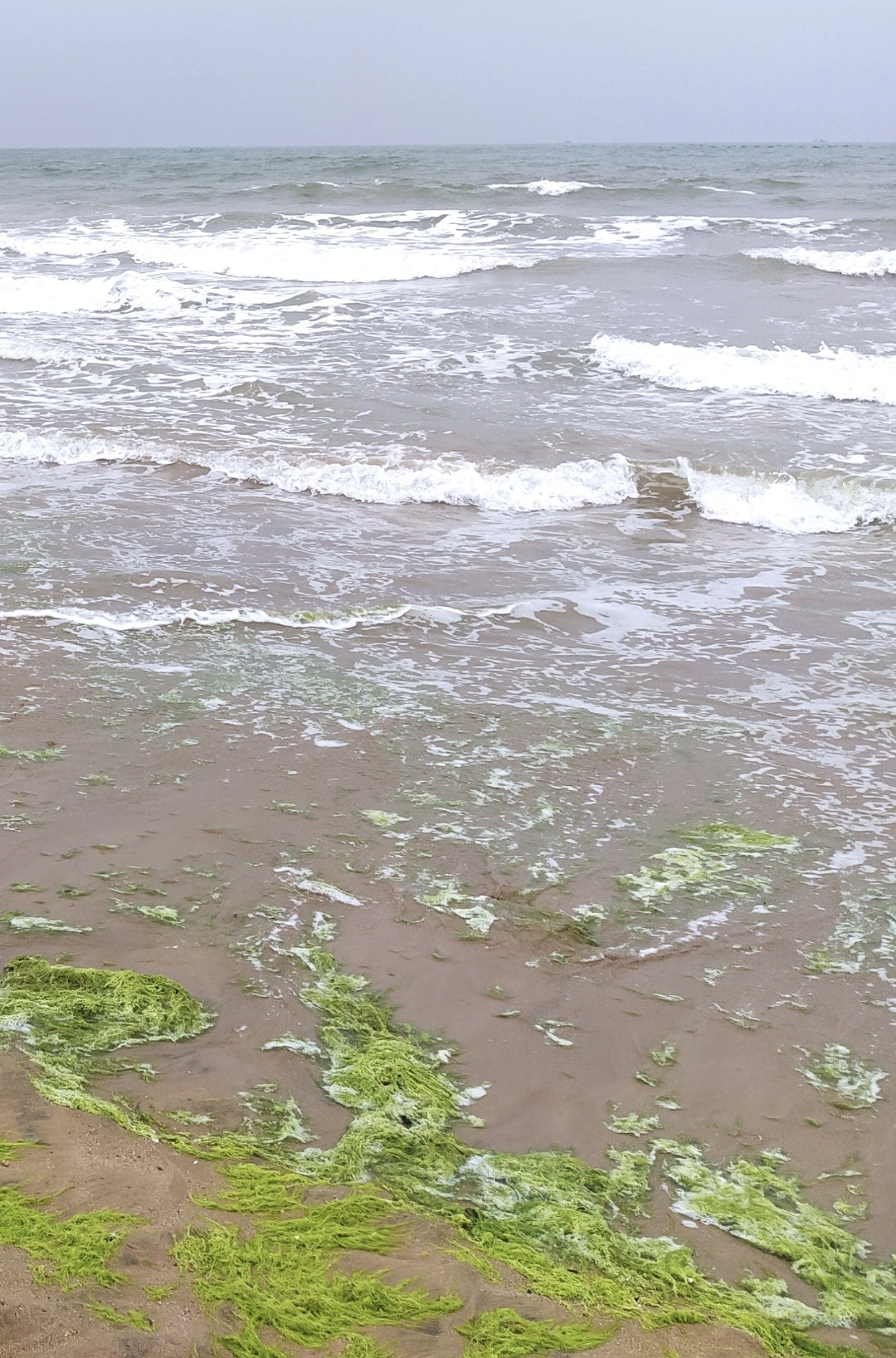
- Ulva prolifera brought onshore after algal bloom

Scientific classification
- Kingdom: Plantae
- Division: Chlorophyta
- Class: Ulvophyceae
- Order: Ulvales
- Family: Ulvaceae
- Genus: Ulva
- Species: U. prolifera

Binomial name
- Ulva prolifera O.F.Müller

Synonyms
- Ulva enteromorpha f. prolifera (O.F.Müller) Van Heurck; Ulva compressa var. prolifera (O.F.Müller) C. Agardh, 1823; Enteromorpha compressa var. prolifera (O.F.Müller) Greville, 1830; Enteromorpha prolifera (O.F.Müller) J.Agardh, 1883; Enteromorpha salina Kützing, 1845; Enteromorpha salina var. polyclados Kützing, 1845; Enteromorpha compressa var. trichodes Kützing, 1845; Enteromorpha polyclados (Kützing) Kützing, 1856

= Ulva prolifera =

Species of alga

Ulva prolifera (previously Enteromorpha prolifera), also known as the branched string lettuce, is a species of seaweed algae in the family Ulvaceae that can be found worldwide.

== Description ==
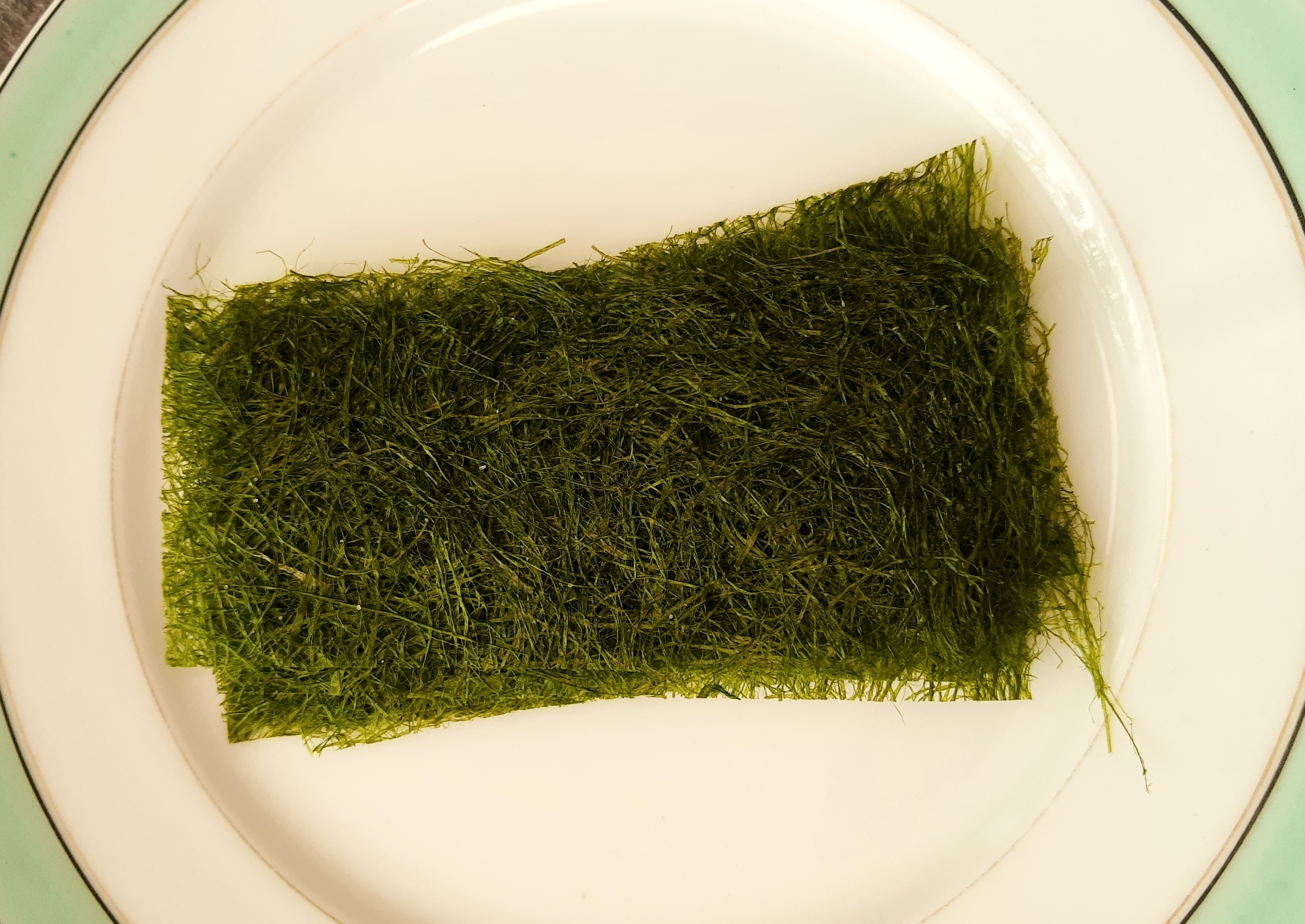
Korean gim made of Ulva prolifera

U. prolifera is visually filamentous and intertwined together by accumulation after an algae bloom. However, the species is actually in tubular form and can grow to half to several meters in length. Typically its diameter does not exceed 5 mm, the actual growth parameters of Ulva prolifera depend on the magnitude of the algal bloom that it is associated with. Its color spans from light green to the color of grass. The species can be found at the coastline after being carried onto the seashore after low tides as it floats along the movements of the seawater.

== Distribution ==
In Europe, it can be found in such countries as Bulgaria, France, Great Britain, Greece, Ireland, Portugal, Romania, Slovenia, Spain and on Lolland island of Denmark. It is also common on African islands such as Canary and Madeira islands, and in the US states such as Alaska, California, Florida, Texas and Washington. Besides the states, Africa and Europe, it is common in Central American countries such as Costa Rica, El Salvador, Panama, and Cuba, with Mexico occasionally getting them on the Pacific side.

The species mostly occurs as wild algae, although some are cultivated in Japan, Korea, China and other countries. China had its largest recorded bloom of the algae in 2013, in the Yellow Sea off the coast of Qingdao.

== Green Tides ==
The green tides caused by the overgrowth of Ulva prolifera in the Yellow Sea of China have been occurring every summer since 2007. The green tide is a major environmental concern that involves the impacts from natural, anthropogenic, physicochemical and algae factors along with the warming of local water. The dynamics of these factors can explain the sudden bloom of U. prolifera off the east coast of China in 2007. This continued as an annual problem for about a decade and caught additional attention in 2008, when the sailing games of the Beijing Olympics was hosted in the city of Qingdao and the green tides can cause great economical and ecological impacts. Every spring since 2007, U. prolifera have initially occurred along the Jiangsu coast with small-scale floating algae, then migrated northward along the coast of the Yellow Sea driven by monsoons and ocean currents, accumulating in the near-shore waters of the Shandong Peninsula in June and July, and then declined gradually. Analysis of meteorological and environmental data and local aquaculture activities strongly supports the hypothesis that the U. prolifera blooms in the Yellow Sea originated from the water off of the coast of Jiangsu. Due to the development of Porphyra yezoensis aquaculture and the excess nutrients deployed for its growth, the water condition is made suitable for algal bloom and green tides when the appropriate seasons come. After harvesting of P. yezoensis and cleaning of ropes, rafts and other attachments, the thalli of U. prolifera were scraped and thrown away by farmers. The free-floating U. prolifera kept growing and drifted to the northern part of Yellow Sea by tides and winds. Such activities give the starting population of such organisms which can reproduce and populate vast areas on top of the ocean.

== Hazards ==
Overgrowing algae bloom at the surface of seawater is an environmental hazard to the coastal underwater biome. Surface algae overextension can block the entry of sunlight below the infected water region, creating a much shallower aphotic zone. The disappearance of sunlight can be fatal for the plants and organisms living below the surface that require sunlight. Phytoplankton photosynthesis will be heavily reduced due to the lack of sunlight which is caused by the overgrowing algae blockade. Insufficient primary production in an ocean biome is devastating for maintaining the local food web.

Additionally, algal respiration is increased for such algal explosion in biomass. The lack of oxygen in the local water area is harmful for all living organisms. The algae washed ashore is also an environmental hazard during degradation by releasing noxious smell into the air. Accumulation of overgrown algae like U. polifera is not only harmful for the environment but also local underwater biome and tourism value.

== Treatments ==
Traditionally, the most direct and intuitive way of blooming algae moving onshore is collecting them from the coast and dispose, or setting up nets offshore to stop the green tide from approaching the coast. Nowadays, there is research being done on the usage of microbial complex formulation spray that promotes rapid degradation.

== In other languages ==
The species have common names in other countries of the world:

- simplified Chinese: 浒苔; traditional Chinese: 滸苔; pinyin: hǔtái
- Hawaiian: Limu 'Ele'ele, Hulu'ilio
- Japanese: 筋青海苔, suji-aonori
- Korean: 가시파래, romanized: gasiparae
- Swedish: Spretig tarmalg

== Gallery ==
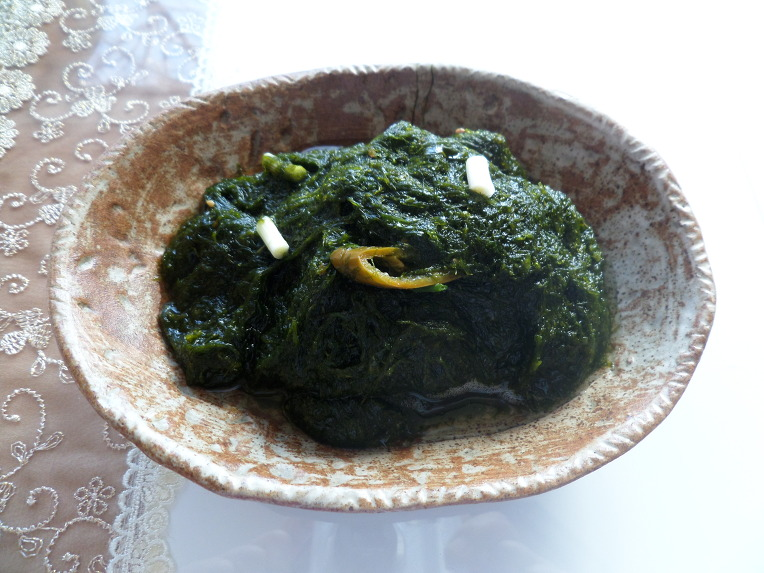
Gamtae-ji (green algae kimchi)

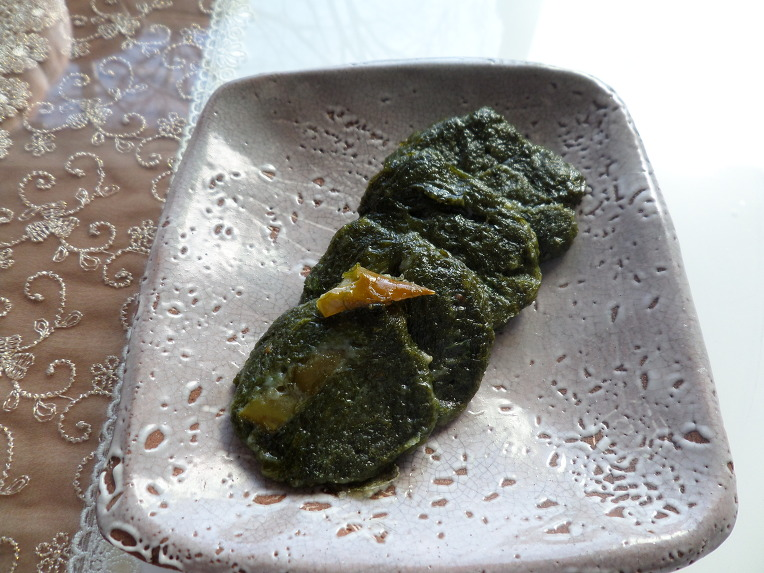
Gamtae-jeon (green algae pancake)
