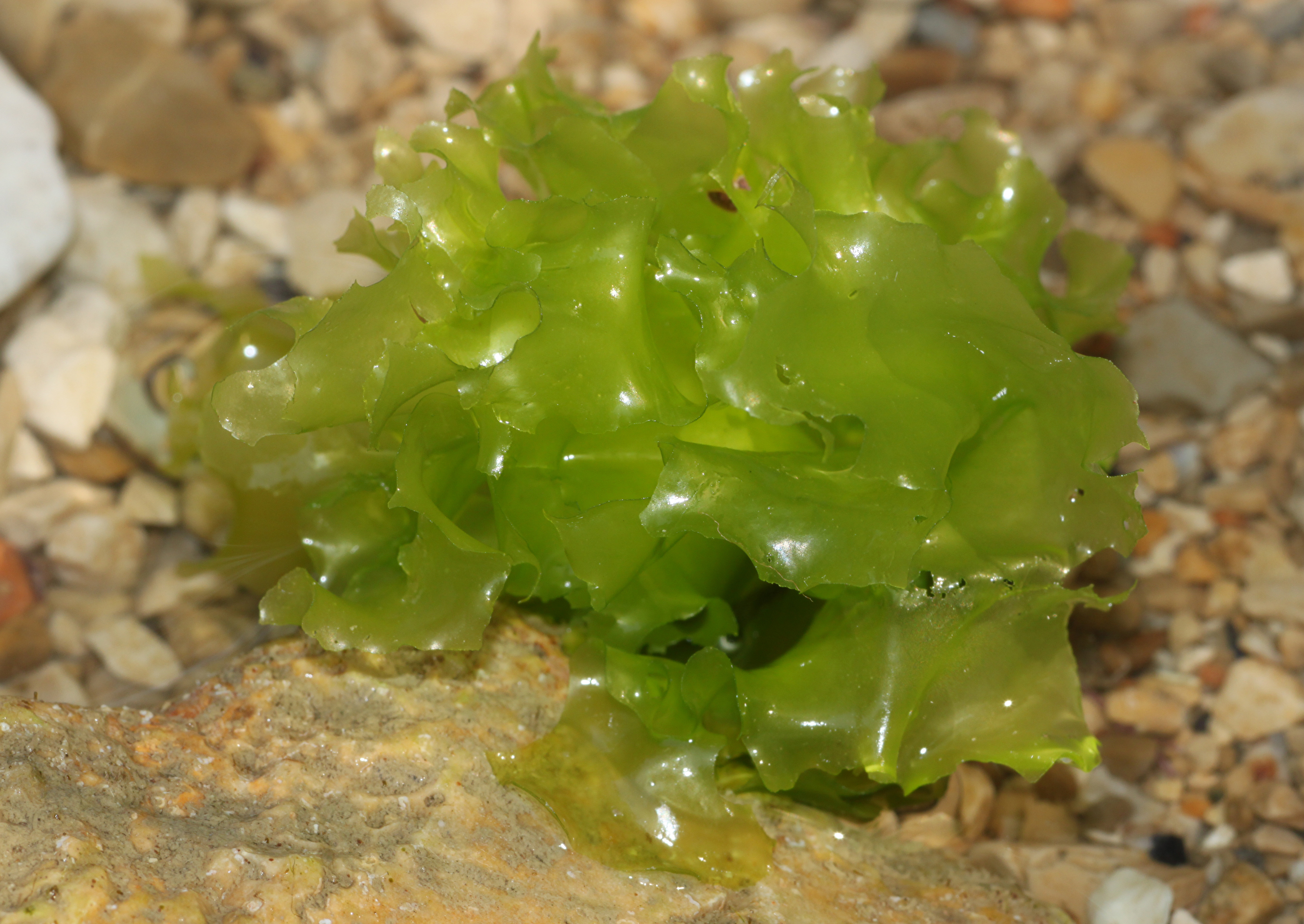
- Ulva lactuca

Scientific classification
- Domain: Eukaryota
- Supergroup: Archaeplastida
- Clade: Viridiplantae
- Division: Chlorophyta
- Class: Ulvophyceae
- Order: Ulvales
- Family: Ulvaceae
- Genus: Ulva; Linnaeus, 1753

Species
- See text

Synonyms
- Enteromorpha Link in Nees, 1820.

= Sea lettuce =

Genus of seaweeds

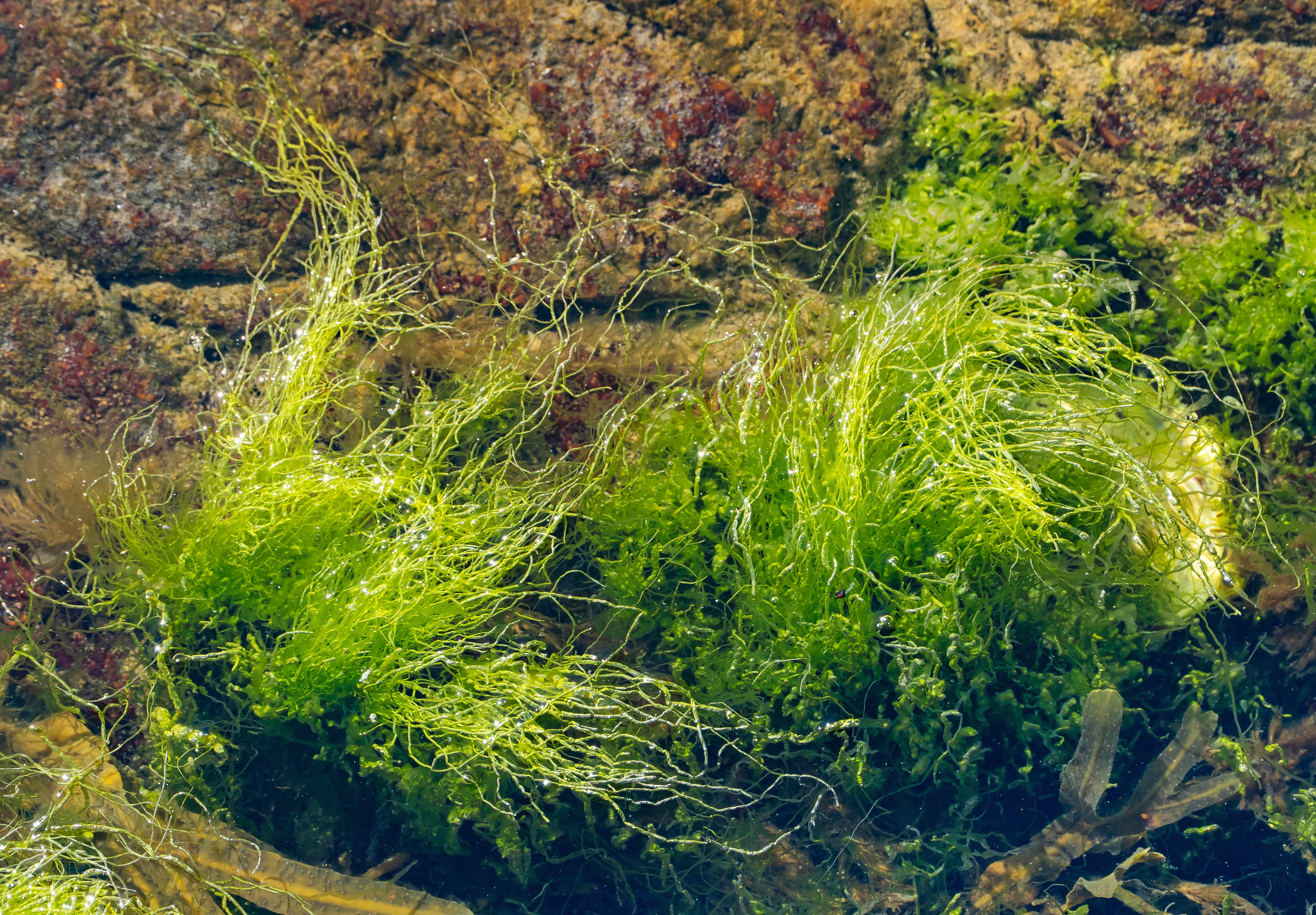
Ulva intestinalis

The sea lettuces comprise the genus Ulva, a group of edible green algae that are widely distributed along the coasts of the world's oceans. The type species within the genus Ulva is Ulva lactuca, lactuca being Latin for "lettuce". The genus also includes the species previously classified under the genus Enteromorpha, which are known under the common name green nori.

== Description ==
Individual blades of Ulva can grow to be more than 400 mm (16 in) in size, but this occurs only when the plants are growing in sheltered areas. A macroscopic alga which is light to dark green in colour, it is attached by disc holdfast. Their structure is a leaflike flattened thallus.

== Nutrition and contamination ==
Sea lettuce is eaten by a number of different sea animals, including manatees and the sea slugs known as sea hares.

Many species of sea lettuce are a food source for humans in Scandinavia, Great Britain, Ireland, China, and Japan (where this food is known as aosa). Sea lettuce as a food for humans is eaten raw in salads and cooked in soups. It is high in protein, soluble dietary fiber, and a variety of vitamins and minerals, especially iron. Enhances flavor and fortifies bread when chopped and mixed into the dough before baking.

Contamination with toxic heavy metals at certain sites where it can be collected makes it dangerous for human consumption.

== Health concerns ==
In August 2009, unprecedented amounts of these algae washed up on the beaches of Brittany, France, causing a major public health scare as it decomposed. The rotting leaves produced large quantities of hydrogen sulfide, a toxic gas. In one incident near Saint-Michel-en-Grève, a horse rider lost consciousness and his horse died after breathing the seaweed fumes; in another, a lorry driver driving a load of decomposing sea lettuce passed out, crashed, and died, with toxic fumes claimed to be the cause. Environmentalists blamed the phenomenon on excessive nitrogenous compounds washed out to sea from improper disposal of pig and poultry slurry from industrial farms, and from chemical products and slurry used as fertilisers in arable farming.

== Species ==
Species in the genus Ulva include:

Accepted species

- Ulva acanthophora (Kützing) Hayden, Blomster, Maggs, P.C. Silva, Stanhope & J.R. Waaland, 2003
- Ulva anandii Amjad & Shameel, 1993
- Ulva arasakii Chihara, 1969
- Ulva atroviridis Levring, 1938
- Ulva australis Areschoug, 1854
- Ulva beytensis Thivy & Sharma, 1966
- Ulva bifrons Ardré, 1967
- Ulva brevistipita V.J. Chapman, 1956
- Ulva burmanica (Zeller) De Toni, 1889
- Ulva californica Wille, 1899
- Ulva chaetomorphoides (Børgesen) Hayden, Blomster, Maggs, P.C. Silva, M.J. Stanhope & J.R. Waaland, 2003
- Ulva clathrata (Roth) C. Agardh, 1811
- Ulva compressa Linnaeus, 1753
- Ulva conglobata Kjellman, 1897
- Ulva cornuta Lightfoot, 1777
- Ulva covelongensis V. Krishnamurthy & H. Joshi, 1969
- Ulva crassa V.J. Chapman, 1956
- Ulva crassimembrana (V.J. Chapman) Hayden, Blomster, Maggs, P.C. Silva, M.J. Stanhope & J.R. Waaland, 2003
- Ulva curvata (Kützing) De Toni, 1889
- Ulva denticulata P.J.L. Dangeard, 1959
- Ulva diaphana Hudson, 1778
- Ulva elegans Gayral, 1960
- Ulva enteromorpha Le Jolis, 1863
- Ulva erecta (Lyngbye) Fries
- Ulva expansa (Setchell) Setchell & N.L. Gardner, 1920
- Ulva fasciata Delile, 1813
- Ulva flexuosa Wulfen, 1803
- Ulva geminoidea V.J. Chapman, 1956
- Ulva gigantea (Kützing) Bliding, 1969
- Ulva grandis Saifullah & Nizamuddin, 1977
- Ulva hookeriana (Kützing) Hayden, Blomster, Maggs, P.C. Silva, M.J. Stanhope & J.R. Waaland
- Ulva hopkirkii (M'Calla ex Harvey) P. Crouan & H. Crouan
- Ulva howensis (A.H.S. Lucas) Kraft, 2007
- Ulva indica Roth, 1806
- Ulva intestinalis Linnaeus, 1753
- Ulva intestinaloides (R.P.T. Koeman & Hoek) Hayden, Blomster, Maggs, P.C. Silva, M.J. Stanhope & J.R. Waaland, 2003
- Ulva javanica N.L. Burman, 1768
- Ulva kylinii (Bliding) Hayden, Blomster, Maggs, P.C. Silva, M.J. Stanhope & J.R. Waaland, 2003
- Ulva lactuca Linnaeus, 1753
- Ulva laetevirens J.E. Areschoug, 1854
- Ulva laingii V.J. Chapman, 1956
- Ulva linearis P.J.L. Dangeard, 1957
- Ulva linza Linnaeus, 1753
- Ulva lippii Lamouroux
- Ulva litoralis Suhr ex Kützing
- Ulva littorea Suhr
- Ulva lobata (Kützing) Harvey, 1855
- Ulva maeotica (Proshkina-Lavrenko) P.M.Tsarenko, 2011
- Ulva marginata (J. Agardh) Le Jolis
- Ulva micrococca (Kützing) Gobi
- Ulva mutabilis Föyn, 1958
- Ulva neapolitana Bliding, 1960
- Ulva nematoidea Bory de Saint-Vincent, 1828
- Ulva ohnoi Hiraoka & Shimada, 2004
- Ulva olivascens P.J.L. Dangeard
- Ulva pacifica Endlicher
- Ulva papenfussii Pham-Hoang Hô, 1969
- Ulva parva V.J. Chapman, 1956
- Ulva paschima Bast
- Ulva patengensis Salam & Khan, 1981
- Ulva percursa (C. Agardh) C. Agardh
- Ulva pertusa Kjellman, 1897
- Ulva phyllosa (V.J. Chapman) Papenfuss
- Ulva polyclada Kraft, 2007
- Ulva popenguinensis P.J.L. Dangeard, 1958
- Ulva porrifolia (S.G. Gmelin) J.F. Gmelin
- Ulva profunda W.R. Taylor, 1928
- Ulva prolifera O.F.Müller, 1778
- Ulva pseudocurvata Koeman & Hoek, 1981
- Ulva pseudolinza (R.P.T. Koeman & Hoek) Hayden, Blomster, Maggs, P.C. Silva, M.J. Stanhope & J.R. Waaland, 2003
- Ulva pulchra Jaasund, 1976
- Ulva quilonensis Sindhu & Panikkar, 1995
- Ulva radiata (J. Agardh) Hayden, Blomster, Maggs, P.C. Silva, M.J. Stanhope & J.R. Waaland, 2003
- Ulva ralfsii (Harvey) Le Jolis, 1863
- Ulva ranunculata Kraft & A.J.K. Millar, 2000
- Ulva reticulata Forsskål, 1775
- Ulva rhacodes (Holmes) Papenfuss, 1960
- Ulva rigida C. Agardh, 1823
- Ulva rotundata Bliding, 1968
- Ulva saifullahii Amjad & Shameel, 1993
- Ulva serrata A.P.de Candolle
- Ulva simplex (K.L. Vinogradova) Hayden, Blomster, Maggs, P.C. Silva, M.J. Stanhope & J.R. Waaland, 2003
- Ulva sorensenii V.J. Chapman, 1956
- Ulva spinulosa Okamura & Segawa, 1936
- Ulva stenophylla Setchell & N.L. Gardner, 1920
- Ulva sublittoralis Segawa, 1938
- Ulva subulata (Wulfen) Naccari
- Ulva taeniata (Setchell) Setchell & N.L. Gardner, 1920
- Ulva tanneri H.S. Hayden & J.R. Waaland, 2003
- Ulva tenera Kornmann & Sahling
- Ulva torta (Mertens) Trevisan, 1841
- Ulva tuberosa Palisot de Beauvois
- Ulva uncialis (Kützing) Montagne, 1850
- Ulva uncinata Mohr
- Ulva uncinata Mertens
- Ulva usneoides Bonnemaison
- Ulva utricularis (Roth) C. Agardh
- Ulva utriculosa C. Agardh
- Ulva uvoides Bory de Saint-Vincent
- Ulva ventricosa A.P.de Candolle

Nomina dubia

- Ulva costata Wollny, 1881
- Ulva repens Clemente, 1807
- Ulva tetragona A.P.de Candolle, 1807

A newly discovered Indian endemic species of Ulva with tubular thallus indistinguishable from Ulva intestinalis has been formally established in 2014 as Ulva paschima Bast. Ten new species have been discovered in New Caledonia: Ulva arbuscula, Ulva planiramosa, Ulva batuffolosa, Ulva tentaculosa, Ulva finissima, Ulva pluriramosa, Ulva scolopendra and Ulva spumosa.

== See also ==
- Green laver
