= Ochlochaete =

Scientific classification
- Clade: Viridiplantae
- Division: Chlorophyta
- Class: Ulvophyceae
- Order: Ulvales
- Family: Ulvaceae
- Genus: Ochlochaete; Thwaites

Species
- Ochlochaete hystrix

Genus of algae

Ochlochaete is a genus of green algae in the family Ulvaceae.
