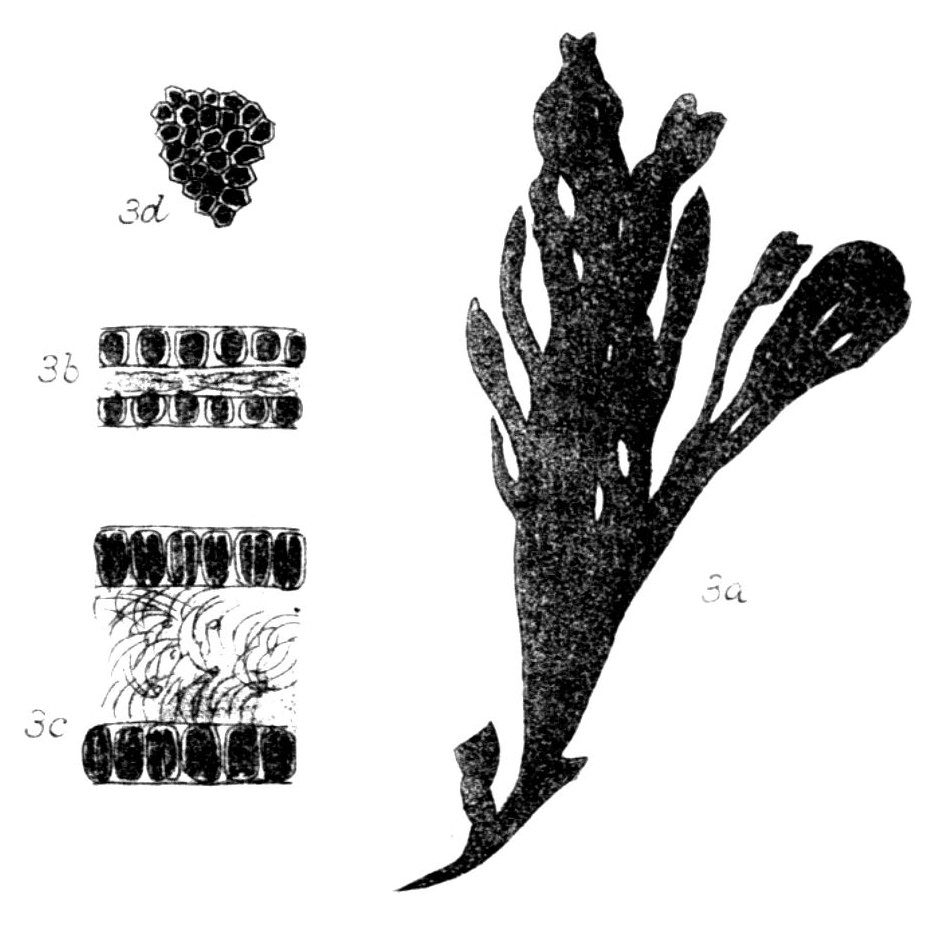
- Umbraulva japonica

Scientific classification
- Kingdom: Plantae
- Division: Chlorophyta
- Class: Ulvophyceae
- Order: Ulvales
- Family: Ulvaceae
- Genus: Umbraulva; E.H.Bae & I.K.Lee

Species
- Umbraulva japonica; Umbraulva amamiensis; Umbraulva dangeardii; Umbraulva kaloakulau; Umbraulva yunseulla

= Umbraulva =

Genus of algae

The genus Umbraulva, which is a green alga within the Ulvaceae family, was proposed by Bae and Lee in 2001. Three additional species, including U. kuaweuweu, which was subsequently transferred to another genus, have been added to the genus since it originally had the three species that were initially examined to form the genus. Umbraulva species grow upon hard substrates, and inhabit deep subtidal areas. Species within this genus are widely distributed, and have been identified in Asia, Europe, Hawaii, and New Zealand. The morphological traits of Umbraulva vary among species, but commonly, Umbraulva are macroscopic with olive green blades containing the photosynthetic pigment siphonaxanthin. The blades are flattened and ellipsoid in shape, or are narrow and oval shaped, with perforations and/or lobes present throughout the blade. As Umbraulva often appear very similar in morphology to closely related groups, the main manner in which Umbraulva was differentiated from related groups was through the divergence of ITS and partial SSU rDNA sequences from those of other Ulva species. Umbraulva is closely related to Ulva, which due to wide distributions, high carbohydrate levels, and a lack of lignin, is a good candidate for use in biofuel, bioremediation, carbon sequestration, and animal feed production.

== Etymology ==
The genus name Umbraulva is derived from two meanings. “Umbra” refers to a specific part of a shadow, and “ulva” means sea lettuce.

== History of Knowledge ==
The genus Umbraulva was first described by Bae and Lee in 2011. After studying the morphology of Ulva japonica (Holmes), Ulva amamiensis, and Ulva olivascens, and analyzing their DNA sequences, Bae and Lee proposed the new genus Umbraulva, and placed the three species they initially studied into that genus as Umbraulva japonica (Holmes), Umbraulva amamiensis (Tanaka), and Umbraulva olivascens (P.J.L Dangeard). The genus was proposed based on the olive-green colour of the thalli of the three species, their deep-water subtidal habitat, the presence of the carotenoid siphonaxanthin in their blades, and the divergence of their internal transcribed spacer (ITS) and small subunit ribosomal (SSU) DNA sequences from other Ulva species. In 2016, Spalding et al. described two new Umbraulva species, Umbraulva kaloakulau, and Umbraulva kuaweuweu. However, in 2020, Kawai et al. found differences in the morphology, life history, the presence of different carotenoids, and divergence in chloroplast genes, between Umbraulva kuaweuweu other Umbraulva species. As a result, Kawai et al proposed the new genus Ryuguphycu, and placed Umbraulva kuaweuweu within that genus. Then, in 2021, Lee et al. described a new specimen as Umbraulva yunseulla. Currently, Umbraulva contains five known species.

== Habitat and Ecology ==
Umbraulva is widely distributed, and has been identified in Korea, Japan, China, France, Spain, Hawaii, Ireland, southern Britain, New Zealand, and the Mediterranean. Umbraulva species inhabit deep waters in the subtidal zone ranging from 3 m up to 125 m, where they grow upon rocks, shells, coralline algae, rhodoliths, and reefs. As an alga capable of photosynthesizing, similar to closely related members of the genus Ulva, Umbraulva plays an essential role as a primary producer, making biomass for consumption up the food chain by herbivores.

== Description ==
=== General morphology ===
Species of Umbraulva vary slightly in their appearances, but have similar morphologies as green multicellular blades of algae. Lee et al. (2020) provided an in-depth comparison of morphological traits across the species of Umbraulva. The shape of the thallus is variable, as it can be globular to sub-globular and funnel-shaped, with a rounded apex, or ellipsoidal and flat with radial perforations. The thallus may also be irregularly perforated with a narrow oval shape in two to five lobes, slightly perforated with a narrow oval shape, or irregularly perforated with an elliptical or wedge shape. The holdfast attaching the blade to its substrate is most commonly discoid, expect in Umbraulva kaloakulau, which has a holdfast that is very small and not easily identified. All Umbraulva species range in colour from olive green to dark green, and have also been described as having an iridescent shimmer on the dorsal side of the blade. Blades of Umbraulva range in height from 4 cm to up to 115 cm, range in width from 5 cm to 50 cm, and range in thickness from 40 micrometers to 400 μm. The margins of the blade have been observed as slightly to completely ruffled or curled, and can be smooth or have microscopic protrusions. In older specimens, the margins have been found to tear. The rhizoidal filaments are generally densely packed or interwoven in the basal region of the thallus. Microscopically, the cells of Umbraulva are cuboidal, rounded rectangles, irregularly polygonal, or polygonal with rounded corners from a surface view. In cross section, the thallus is solid and is diastromic with two layers of cells. Chloroplasts are associated with the edges of the cell and are present in a tilted orientation along the inner cell wall. The number of pyrenoids in each cell ranges from 1 up to 4 depending on the species. Starch is stored inside the chloroplast, and starch granules have been observed as a sheath around the pyrenoid, giving it the appearance of a white, round granule. Within the chloroplast, siphonaxanthin has been identified as an important accessory pigment to broaden the spectrum of light that can be used in photosynthesis.

=== Life cycle ===
It is stated by Kawai et al. (2020) that U. japonica has a sporic isomorphic life history similar to that of Ulva, and it is expected that other Umbraulva species also have sporic life histories. Within this life cycle, the macroscopic sporophyte is diploid. The sporophyte has diploid sporangia, which undergo meiosis to produce haploid flagellated zoids. These zoids then germinate into haploid gametophytes, which have gametangia. From the gametangia, haploid gametes arise and undergo syngamy to produce a diploid zygote, which germinates back into the diploid sporophyte. As this life cycle is isomorphic, the diploid sporophyte and the haploid gametophyte are morphologically identical.

=== Differentiating characteristics ===
Umbraulva is in the Ulvaceae family, and is closely related to other genera, most notably Ulva. The three species initially placed in Umbraulva were originally described within the genus Ulva, indicating that differentiating between species of the two genera may be difficult. Particularly, the early developmental stages of Umbraulva are very similar to that of the typical ulvacean. Traits that can be used to distinguish Umbraulva from closely related groups are cells that are larger in the mature plant, cells that are rounded, especially in apical areas, and sterile cells within the margins of the blade that become unattached when reproductive cells are released. Further, investigations into DNA evidence, particularly ITS and SSU rDNA sequences, which are highly conserved and thus very specific to the given species, can be used to differentiate related groups. Umbraulva species have been found to have 3.0% to 3.3% divergence of these sequences from Ulva and Enteromorpha.

== Human Importance ==
Groups in the Ulvaceae family closely related to Umbraulva have been under consideration for use in capturing carbon, bioremediation, and production of biofuels and feedstock because of their lack of lignin, large biomass, wide distribution, and high levels of carbohydrates. The lack of lignin is beneficial to their use a biofuel because the cell walls of these algae are not bound tightly with lignin, allowing for cellulose, which is a key element in biofuel production to be extracted more efficiently. Thus, since Umbraulva is related, and likely shares similar traits, it can be reasonably expected that Umbraulva could be used in a similar manner.
