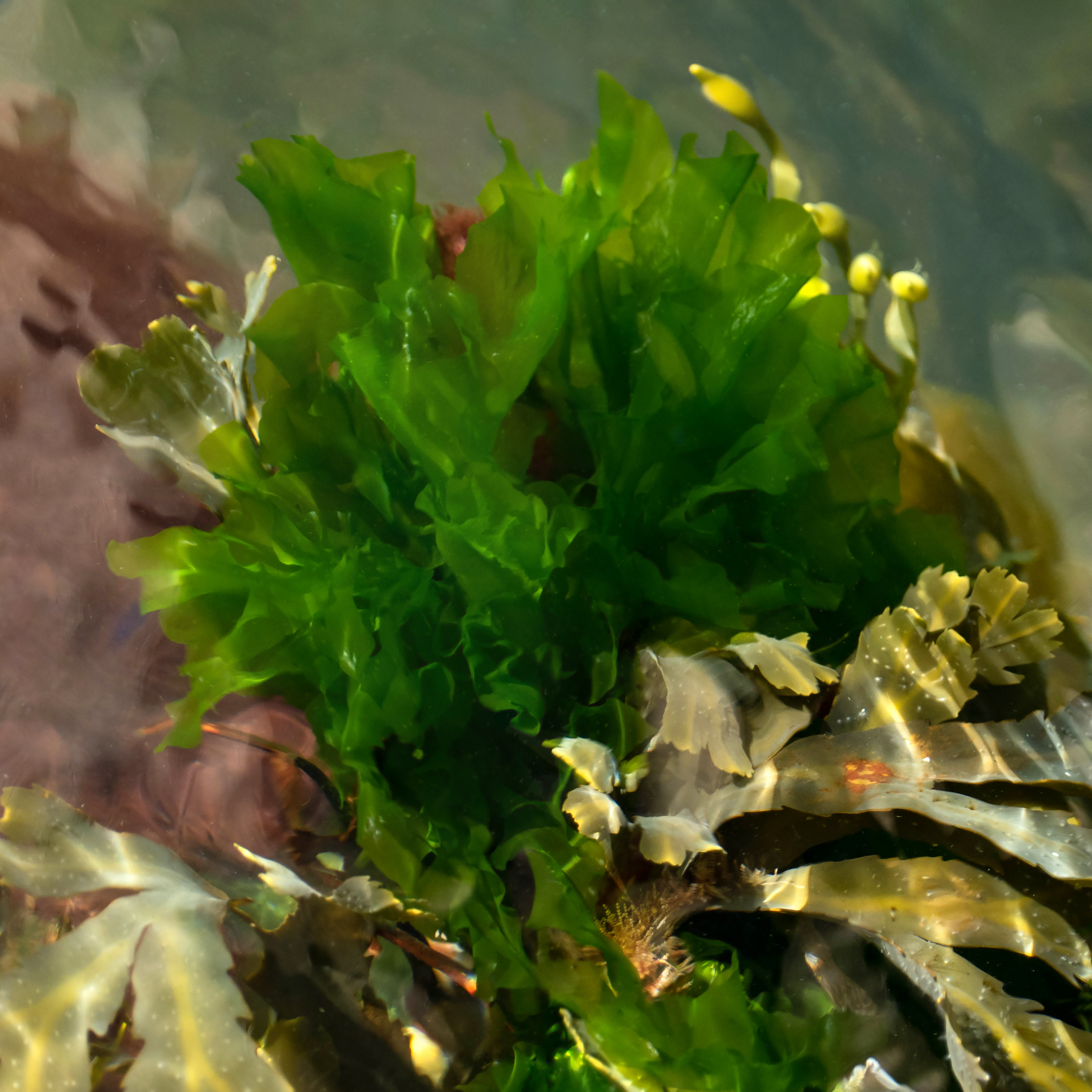
- Ulva lactuca in Brofjorden, Sweden
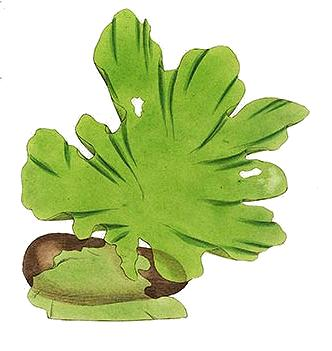
- Illustration of Ulva lactuca in English Botany (Sowerby, 1790-1814)

Scientific classification
- Kingdom: Plantae
- Division: Chlorophyta
- Class: Ulvophyceae
- Order: Ulvales
- Family: Ulvaceae
- Genus: Ulva
- Species: U. lactuca

Binomial name
- Ulva lactuca L.

Synonyms
- Ulva crassa V. J. Chapman, 1956

= Ulva lactuca =

Species of chlorophyte green alga

Ulva lactuca, also known by the common name sea lettuce or broadleaf sea lettuce, is an edible green alga in the family Ulvaceae. It is the type species of the genus Ulva. A synonym is U. fenestrata, referring to its "windowed" or "holed" appearance.

== Description ==
Ulva lactuca is a thin flat green alga growing from a discoid holdfast. The margin is somewhat ruffled and often torn. It may reach 18 centimetres (7 in) or more in length, though generally much less, and up to 30 cm (12 in) across. The membrane is two cells thick, soft and translucent, and grows attached, without a stipe, to rocks or other algae by a small disc-shaped holdfast.

Green to dark green in colour, this species in the Chlorophyta is formed of two layers of cells irregularly arranged, as seen in cross-section. The chloroplast is cup-shaped in some references but as a parietal plate in others with one to three pyrenoids. There are other species of Ulva which are similar and not always easy to differentiate.

=== Life cycle ===
The sporangial and gametangial thalli are morphologically alike. The diploid adult plant produces zoospores by meiosis – making them haploid. These settle and grow to form haploid male and female plants similar to the diploid plants. When these haploid plants release gametes they unite to produce the zygote which germinates, and grows to produce the diploid plant.

== Distribution ==
The distribution is worldwide: Europe, North America (west and east coasts), Central America, Caribbean Islands, South America, Africa, Indian Ocean Islands, South-west Asia, China, Pacific Islands, Australia and New Zealand.

== Ecology ==
Ulva lactuca is very common on rocks and on other algae in the littoral and sublittoral on shores all around the British Isles, the coast of France, the Low Countries and up to Denmark. In the Pacific Northwest, Ulva lactuca L. is distributed from Alaska to the Gulf of California.

It is particularly prolific in areas where nutrients are abundant. This has been the case off the coast of Brittany where a high level of nitrates, from the intensive farming there, washes out to sea. The result is that large quantities of U. lactuca are washed up on beaches, where their decay produces methane, hydrogen sulfide, and other gases.

Certain environmental conditions can lead to the algae spreading over large areas. In August 2009, unprecedented levels of the algae washed up on the beaches of Brittany, France, causing a major public health scare as it decomposed. The rotting thalli produced large quantities of hydrogen sulfide, a toxic gas which, like hydrogen cyanide, inhibits cytochrome c oxidase, inhibiting cellular respiration and resulting in critical cellular hypoxia. In one incident near Saint-Michel-en-Grève, a horse rider lost consciousness and his horse died after breathing the seaweed fumes. Environmentalists blamed the phenomenon on excessive use of fertilizers and the excretion of nitrates by pigs and poultry. In an earlier separate incident at the same beach in July 2009, a truck driver had died near his vehicle after hauling three truckloads of sea lettuce without protective gear during the annual cleanup. Although initially recorded as a heart attack, the death of the truck driver prompted French authorities to exhume his remains for an autopsy. It was later determined to be cardiac arrest resulting from pulmonary edema, which is an indication of possible hydrogen sulfide poisoning. Environmentalists claimed that dead animals found on the algae-clogged beaches (including 31 wild boars in July 2011) were a result of toxic fumes.

== Uses ==
In Scotland, U. lactuca is used in soups and salads. In Hawaiʻi, U. lactuca is also called limu pālahala and eaten in different ways: mixed with other algae, salted and served with raw fish, boiled in water and served as a soup, or served with chili pepper, onions, soy sauce and sugar. Additionally, U. lactuca has traditional uses in Hawaiʻi as fertilizer and as adornment for hula. When U. lactuca is used for hula it is called limu pāpahapaha.

As an alternative to vegetable oil crops, U. lactuca can be a source of biofuels, suitable for transesterification in biodiesel production, and does not require arable land and fertilizers. It can grow in saline and waste water and has a higher ability in sequestering atmospheric carbon dioxide than terrestrial energy crops.
