= Gutweed =

Gutweed may refer to:

- Ulva intestinalis, a seaweed
- Sonchus arvensis, a terrestrial plant
