= Ruthnielsenia =

Scientific classification
- Kingdom: Plantae
- Division: Chlorophyta
- Class: Ulvophyceae
- Order: Ulvales
- Family: Ulvaceae
- Genus: Ruthnielsenia; C.J.O'Kelly, B.Wynsor & W.K.Bellows, 2004

Species
- Ruthnielsenia tenuis

Genus of algae

Ruthnielsenia is a genus of green algae in the family Ulvaceae.
