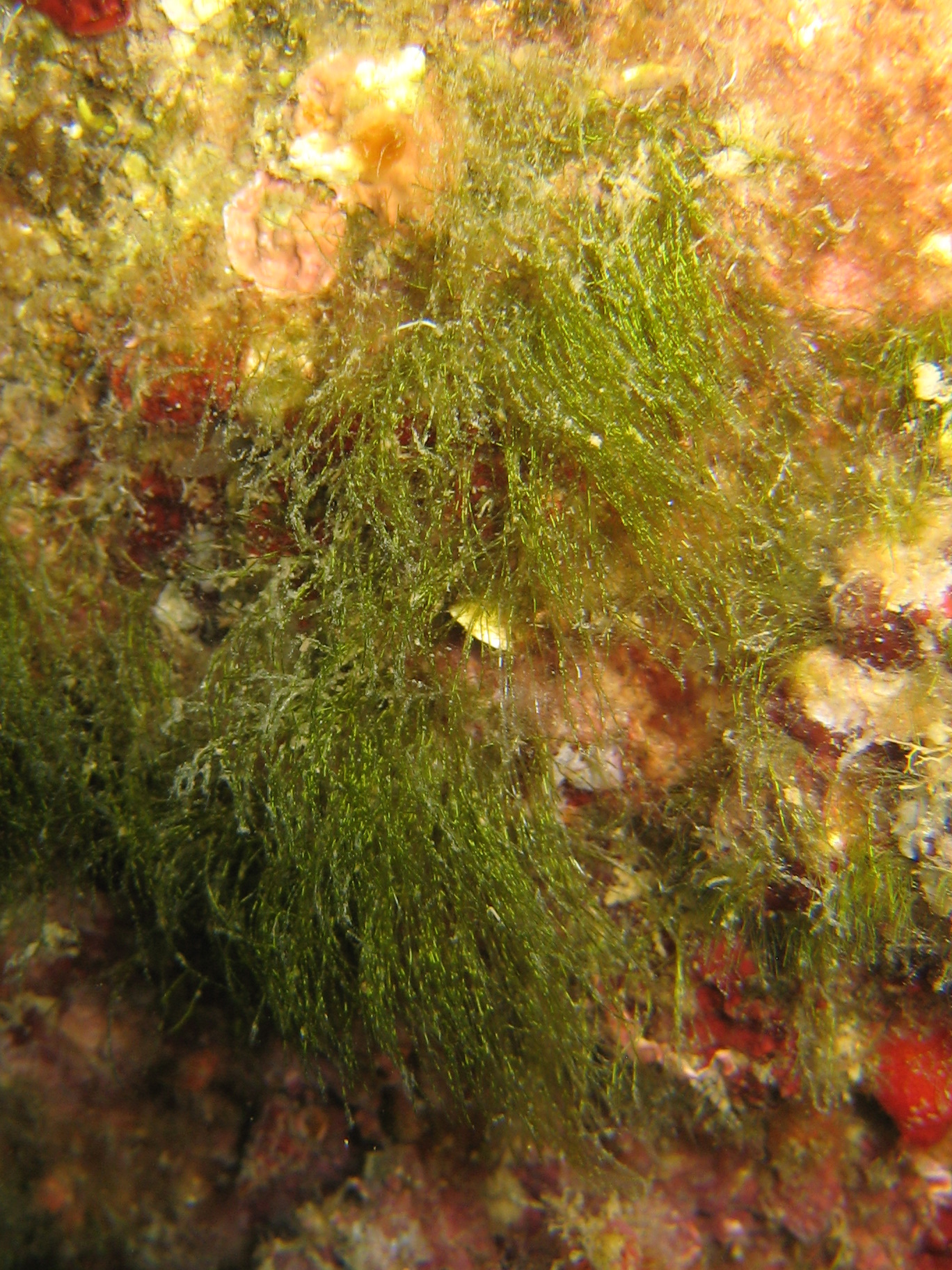
- Ulva compressa

Scientific classification
- Kingdom: Plantae
- Division: Chlorophyta
- Class: Ulvophyceae
- Order: Ulvales
- Family: Ulvaceae
- Genus: Ulva
- Species: U. compressa

Binomial name
- Ulva compressa Linnaeus, 1753

= Ulva compressa =

Species of alga

Ulva compressa is a species of seaweed in Ulvaceae family that can be found in North America, Mediterranean Sea, and throughout Africa and Australia.

== Description ==
The species is green coloured and is measured 2–20 centimetres (0.79–7.87 in) in length.

== Distribution ==
This species is widespread worldwide including in the North and South Atlantic and in the Pacific Ocean.

== Habitat ==
The species can be found in the intertidal zone in sheltered to open coastal sites, in shallow water, tide pools, and also on rock pools and sand.

== Consumption and production ==
The plant is widely produced in China, Japan, and Korea. The species is edible by both animals and humans alike, due to its high levels of nutrients and good taste. It is also used in various cosmetics to prevent skin itchiness. It is used as fertilizer because it adds a wide range of minerals to the soil.
