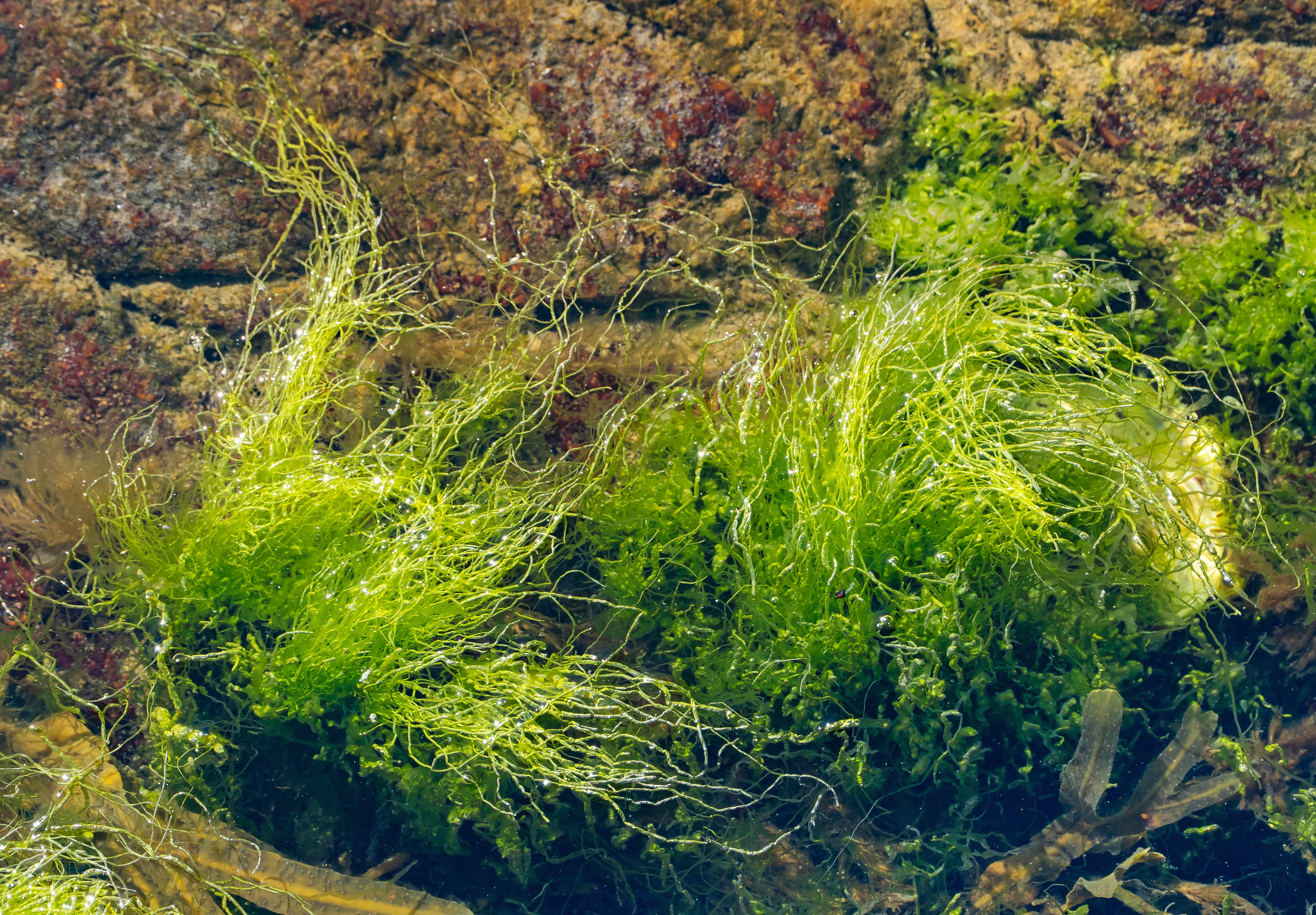

Scientific classification
- Kingdom: Plantae
- Division: Chlorophyta
- Class: Ulvophyceae
- Order: Ulvales
- Family: Ulvaceae
- Genus: Ulva
- Species: U. intestinalis

Binomial name
- Ulva intestinalis L.

Synonyms
- Enteromorpha intestinalis

= Ulva intestinalis =

Species of marine chlorophyte green alga

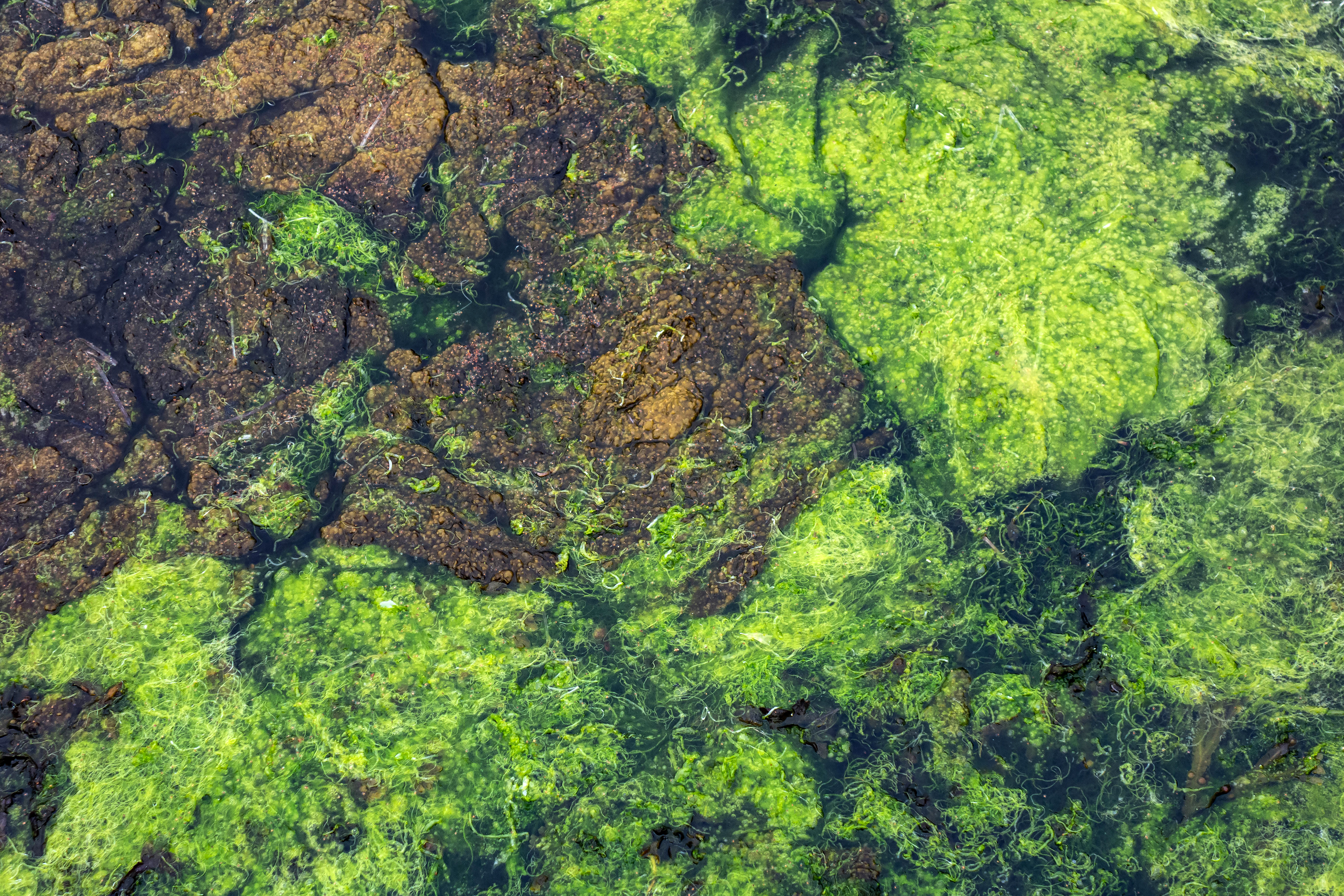
Large green lumps of Ulva intestinalis floating among brown algae in Brofjorden

Ulva intestinalis is a green alga in the family Ulvaceae, known by the common names sea lettuce, green bait weed, gutweed, and grass kelp. Until they were reclassified by genetic work completed in the early 2000s, the tubular members of the sea lettuce genus Ulva were placed in the genus Enteromorpha.

== Distribution ==
This species has a generally world-wide distribution. In the Pacific Ocean, it can be found in the Bering Sea near Alaska, the Aleutian Islands, Puget Sound, Japan, Korea, Mexico, the Philippines, and Russia, as well as New Zealand. In the Atlantic Ocean, its range includes the Azores, the Baltic Sea, the Mediterranean Sea, and northern European countries such as Ireland, Belgium, Denmark, Norway, and Poland.

== Description ==
The branched fronds are completely tubular and expand in width to mid-thallus, reaching 15 cm long or more. The cells are irregularly arranged and the chloroplast is hood-shaped and placed to one side, generally with only one pyrenoid. The species may be 10–30 centimetres (3.9–11.8 in) long and 6–18 millimetres (0.24–0.71 in) wide. The fronds have rounded tips.

This alga may be reproductive at all times of the year, and has a life-cycle with alternation of generations, in which the gametophyte and sporophyte are isomorphic, having identical morphology.

In some references the species (Ulva intestinalis) is treated as two subspecies: ssp. intestinalis (L.) Link and ssp. compressa (L.) Link.

== In other languages ==
- Irish: Lineáil ghorm
- Danish: tarm-rørhinde
- Dutch: echt darmwier
- French: entéromorphe
- German: Darmtang, gemeiner Darmtang
- Norwegian: tarmgrønske
- Polish: sałata, taśma, watka
- Swedish: tarmalg
- Thai: สาหร่ายไส้ไก่
- Portuguese: erva-patinha
