= Saint-Michel-en-Grève =

Saint-Michel-en-Grève Lokmikael-an-Traezh
- Commune
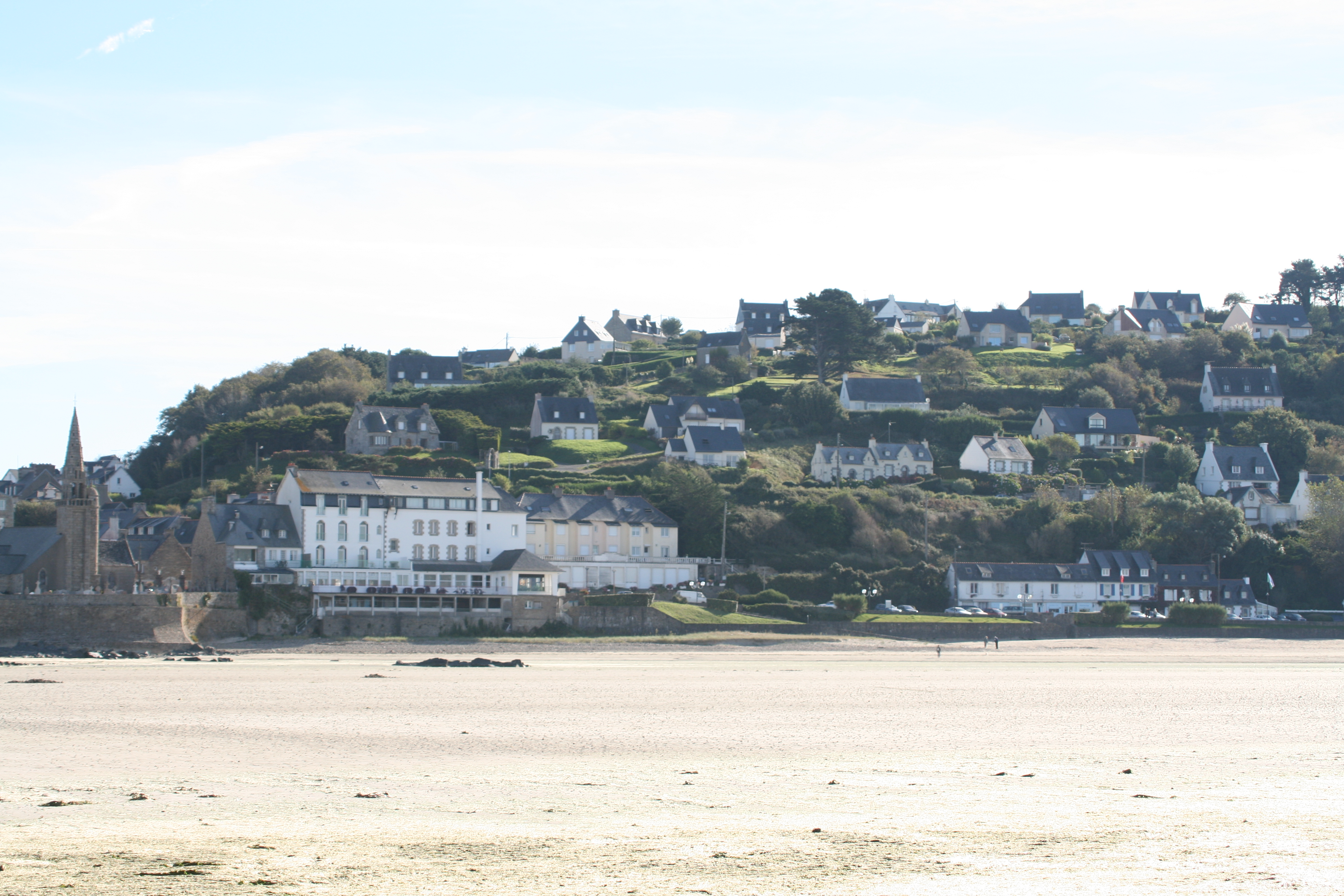
- A view of the village from the beach
- Location of Saint-Michel-en-Grève
- Location within France Location within Brittany
- Coordinates: 48°41′02″N 3°33′45″W
- Country: France
- Region: Brittany
- Department: Côtes-d'Armor
- Arrondissement: Lannion
- Canton: Plestin-les-Grèves
- Intercommunality: Lannion-Trégor Communauté

Government
  - Mayor (2020–2026): François Ponchon
- Area^{1}: 4.69 km^{2} (1.81 sq mi)
- Highest elevation: 107 m (351 ft)
- Lowest elevation: 0 m (0 ft)
- Population (2023): 447
  - Density: 95.3/km^{2} (247/sq mi)
- Time zone: UTC+01:00 (CET)
  - Summer (DST): UTC+02:00 (CEST)
- INSEE/Postal code: 22319 /22300
- ^{1} French Land Register data, which excludes lakes, ponds, glaciers > 1 km^{2} (0.386 sq mi or 247 acres) and river estuaries.

Saint-Michel-en-Grève (French pronunciation: [sɛ̃ miʃɛl ɑ̃ ɡʁɛv]; Breton: Lokmikael-an-Traezh) is a commune in the Côtes-d'Armor department of Brittany in northwestern France.

In 2009 huge quantities of sea lettuce seaweed (Ulva lactuca) washed up on the beach at Saint Michel. Poisonous gases resulting from its decomposition caused the death of a horse and may have been a factor in the earlier death of a cleanup crew truck driver.

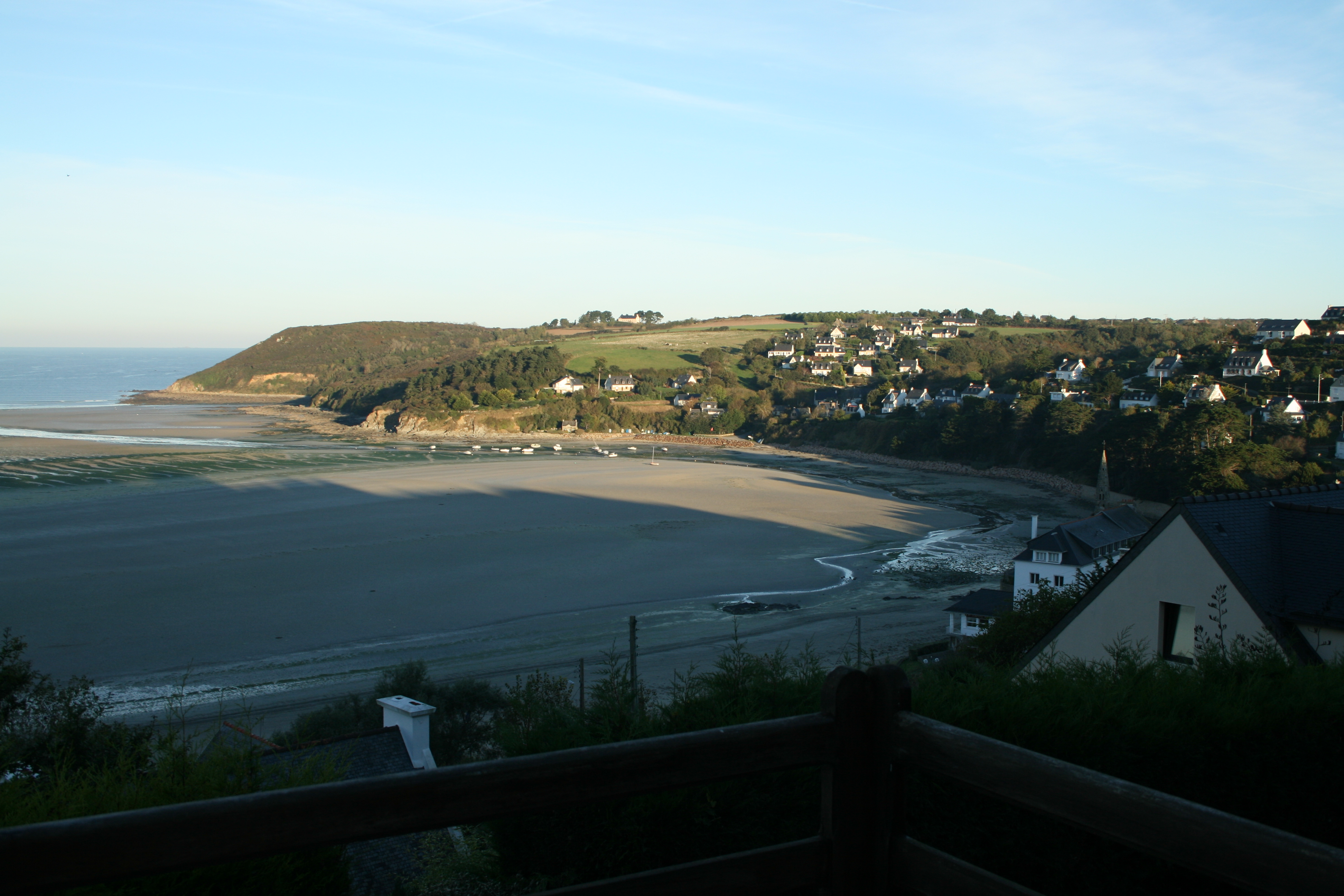
The bay at Saint-Michel-en-Grève

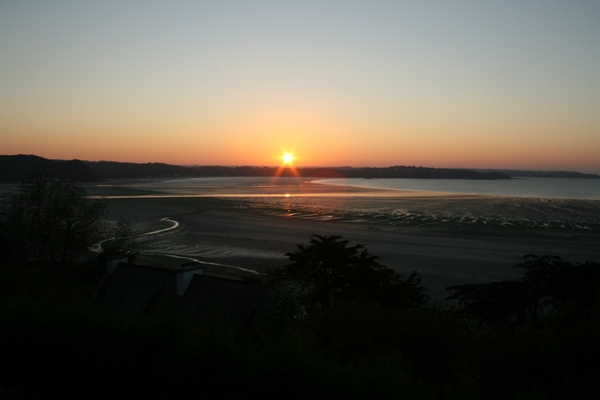
Sunset over the Lieue-de-Grève

== Population ==
Historical population
| Year | Pop. | ±% p.a. |
|---|---|---|
| 1968 | 372 | — |
| 1975 | 382 | +0.38% |
| 1982 | 398 | +0.59% |
| 1990 | 376 | −0.71% |
| 1999 | 399 | +0.66% |
| 2007 | 473 | +2.15% |
| 2012 | 465 | −0.34% |
| 2017 | 456 | −0.39% |
| 2023 | 447 | −0.33% |
Source: INSEE

Inhabitants of Saint-Michel-en-Grève are called michelois in French.

== See also ==
- Communes of the Côtes-d'Armor department
