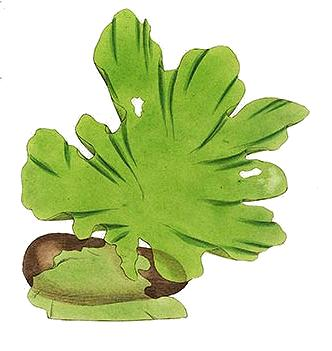
- Ulva lactuca

Scientific classification
- Kingdom: Plantae
- Division: Chlorophyta
- Class: Ulvophyceae
- Order: Ulvales
- Family: Ulvaceae (J.V.Lamour.) Dumort. (1822)

Genera
- See text

= Ulvaceae =

Family of algae

Ulvaceae (/əlˈveɪsi.iː, -ˌaɪ/) is a widely distributed family of thin green algae characterized by a flat or a hollow tubular thallus, reproducing via conjugation of planogametes or zoospores, and classified within the orders Ulotrichales or, more commonly, Ulvales.

== Genera in the family Ulvaceae ==
- Gemina V.J.Chapman, 1952
- Letterstedtia Areschoug, 1850
- Ochlochaete Thwaites, 1849
- Percursaria Bory de Saint-Vincent, 1823
- Ruthnielsenia C.J.O'Kelly, B.Wynsor & W.K.Bellows, 2004
- Ryuguphycus H.Kawai, T.Hanyuda & T.Kitayama, 2020
- Ulva Linnaeus, 1753
- Ulvaria Ruprecht, 1850
- Umbraulva E.H.Bae & I.K.Lee, 2001
