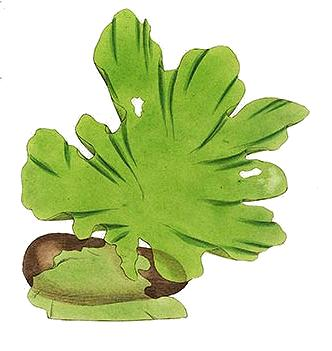
- Ulva

Scientific classification
- Kingdom: Plantae
- Division: Chlorophyta
- Class: Ulvophyceae
- Order: Ulvales; Blackman & Tansley

Families
- Bolbocoleonaceae; Cloniophoraceae; Ctenocladaceae; Kornmanniaceae; Phaeophilaceae; Ulvaceae; Ulvellaceae

= Ulvales =

Order of algae

Ulvales is an order of green algae in the class Ulvophyceae. Algae of this order are most commonly found in aquatic habitats (mainly marine or brackish waters); some are found in fresh water or are terrestrial. They are found free-floating, attached to a substrate, or endophytic. Well-known examples include Ulva (including Enteromorpha), which is commonly known as sea lettuce and is a ubiquitous seaweed.

The Ulvales consist of macroscopic or microscopic algae with diverse morphologies (filamentous, pseudoparenchymatous, tubular or blade-like). Cells generally contain a single parietally placed chloroplast with one or multiple pyrenoids, and one or multiple nuclei.

Asexual reproduction occurs via biflagellate or quadriflagellate zoospores. Sexual reproduction is variable, but has not been reported from all taxa. Sexual reproduction is isogamous or anisogamous, with gametes (which are biflagellate) being formed from unisexual or bisexual thalli. The cell cycle is diplohaplontic, and generations may be isomorphic or heteromorphic.

== Phylogeny ==
Molecular phylogenetic studies suggest the following relationships between families:

- - Ulvales
    - - - - Ulvaceae
          - Ulvellaceae
        - Cloniophoraceae
      - - Bolbocoleonaceae
        - Kornmanniaceae
    - - Phaeophilaceae
      - Ctenocladaceae
  - Chlorocystidales (outgroup)
