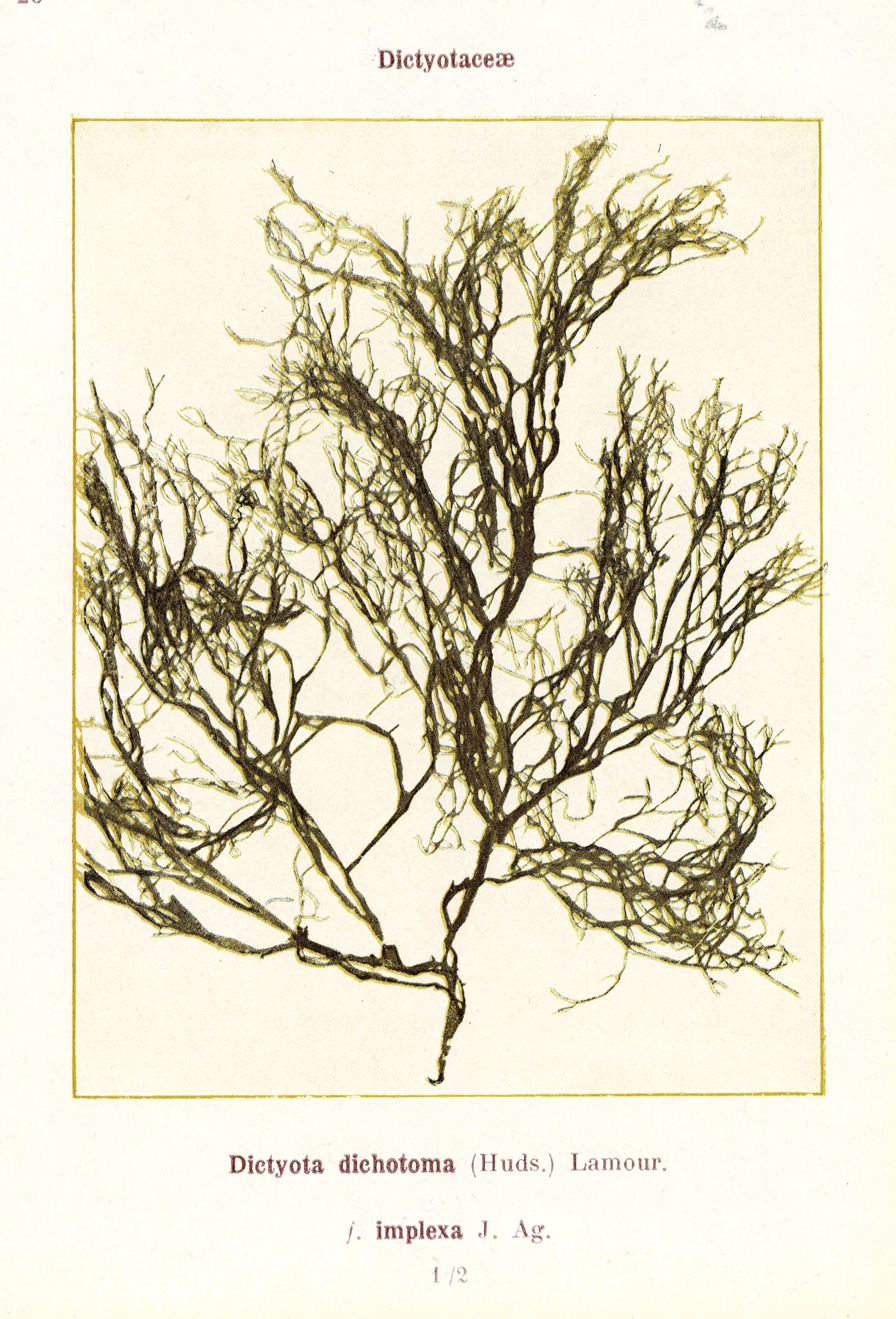

Scientific classification
- Domain: Eukaryota
- Clade: Sar
- Clade: Stramenopiles
- Phylum: Ochrophyta
- Class: Phaeophyceae
- Order: Dictyotales
- Family: Dictyotaceae
- Genus: Dictyota
- Species: D. implexa

Binomial name
- Dictyota implexa (Desfontaines) J.V.Lamouroux

Synonyms
- Dichophyllium implexum (Desfontaines) Kützing, 1843; Dichophyllium lineare (C.Agardh) Kützing, 1843; Dictyota dichotoma var. implexa (Desfontaines) S.F.Gray, 1821; Dictyota divaricata J.V.Lamouroux, 1809; Dictyota linearis (C.Agardh) Greville, 1830; Dictyota pusilla J.V.Lamouroux, 1809; Fucus implexus Desfontaines, 1799; Zonaria divaricata (Lamouroux) C.Agardh, 1817; Zonaria linearis C.Agardh, 1820

= Dictyota implexa =

Species of brown algae

Dictyota implexa is a species of brown alga found in the temperate eastern Atlantic Ocean and the Mediterranean Sea.

== Description ==
The thallus of Dictyota implexa is quite variable in appearance and is a yellowish-brown colour. It forms membranous, flattened, dichotomously-branching fronds up to 14 cm (5.5 in) long. These are anchored to the seabed by rhizoids, filamentous outgrowths that can absorb nutrients from their surroundings. The thallus branches are thread-like, only about 1 mm (0.04 in) thick, of uniform cross-section along their entire length. Other seaweeds with which it could be confused include Dictyota dichotoma, Dictyota cyanoloma, Dictyota fasciola, Dictyota mediterranea, and Dictyota spiralis; D dichotoma is larger and more ribbon-like; D. cyanoloma is larger and iridescent, with a spiral growth form; D. fasciola is also spiral, but not iridescent; D. mediterranea has thread-like cylindrical branches but is more robust; and D. spiralis is more ribbon-like and is sparsely branched.

== Distribution and habitat ==
Dictyota implexa is native to the Mediterranean Sea and the adjacent temperate parts of the eastern Atlantic Ocean. It grows either on rocks, or epiphytically on the leaf blades of seagrasses such as Posidonia oceanica or on the thalli of larger seaweeds, at depths down to about 15 m (50 ft).

== Ecology ==
This species needs to grow in a well-lit situation as it uses the chlorophyll and carotenoid pigments in its tissues to convert light energy into chemical energy by photosynthesis. It is dioecious, reproduction taking place in the spring and summer. Each plant has a sporophyte phase followed by the production of either male or female gametophytes, in alternating generations. It can also reproduce asexually by fragmentation when pieces of the thallus break off and become established in new locations.

== Research ==
Brown algae contain secondary metabolites which discourage herbivores from feeding on them, and many of these, including extracts from the widespread genus Dictyota have antimicrobial and antioxidant activity. Dictyota dichotoma, and Dictyota dichotoma var. implexa, have been investigated in this respect, and have been shown to have antibacterial activity against Salmonella typhimurium, Bacillus subtilis and Staphylococcus aureus.
