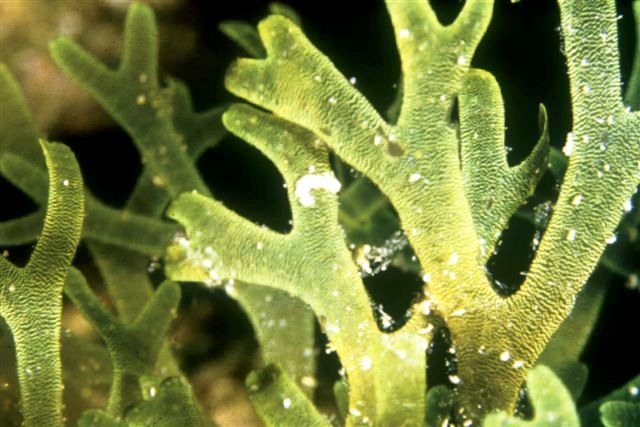
- Dictyota dichotoma at Capo Gallo, Palermo, Sicily

Scientific classification
- Domain: Eukaryota
- Supergroup: Stramenopiles
- Division: Ochrophyta
- Class: Phaeophyceae
- Order: Dictyotales
- Family: Dictyotaceae
- Genus: Dictyota; J.V.Lamouroux, 1809

Type species
- Dictyota dichotoma (Hudson) J.V.Lamouroux

Species
- See text

= Dictyota =

Genus of seaweed

Dictyota is a genus of brown seaweed in the family Dictyotaceae. Species are predominantly found in tropical and subtropical seas, and are known to contain numerous chemicals (diterpenes) which have potential medicinal value. As at the end of 2017, some 237 different diterpenes had been identified from across the genus.

== Taxonomy and Nomenclature ==
The genus Dictyota was first described by Jean Vincent Lamouroux in 1809. The name Dictyota is derived from the Greek word "Διχτυον" meaning "net" or "network", referring to the inner cellular structure of specimens when viewed under a microscope, which features netted cortical and medullary cells.

Dictyota belongs to the order Dictyotales and the SSDO-clade, which also includes the orders Sphacelariales, Syringodermatales, and Onslowiales. The family Dictyotaceae is divided into two tribes: Dictyoteae and Zonarieae. The former have a single lens-shaped apical cell from which the thallus grows, while the latter are characterized by a row or cluster of apical cells. The genera Glossophora, Glossophorella, and Pachdictyon are synonyms of Dictyota as DNA sequencing revealed that they were closely related.

== Morphology ==
=== External characteristics ===
Dictyota has "flat, ribbon-like axes" which exhibit dichotomous branching that may be either isotomous (equal or symmetrical) or anisotomous (unequal). Isotomous branches may be recurved, while anisotomous branches may become falcate (hooked), or cervicorn, if combined with twisting axes. Apical meristems of Dictyota species have been reported to be either truncate, rounded, or acute. A considerable degree of morphological plasticity has been observed from branching patterns, thus making molecular analyses indispensable when identifying species.

Colors of living thalli range from dark brown to green (as in D. friabilis) or blue (as in D. cyanoloma). The thalli grow from apical cells which differentiate into an outer cortical and an inner medullary cell layer. Cortical cells on the margins of the thalli may grow into leaf-like projections or teeth (as in D. ciliolata and D. cyanoloma) while adventitious branches may grow from the central cortical cells. Thalli may also grow hair (20-50 um in diameter). Thalli attach to the substrate via rhizoids which are multicellular, uniseriate, branching, and hyaline (glassy or transparent). Different species may have one or several attachment points which can lead to a wide range of growth forms (i.e. creeping thalli or fully erect).

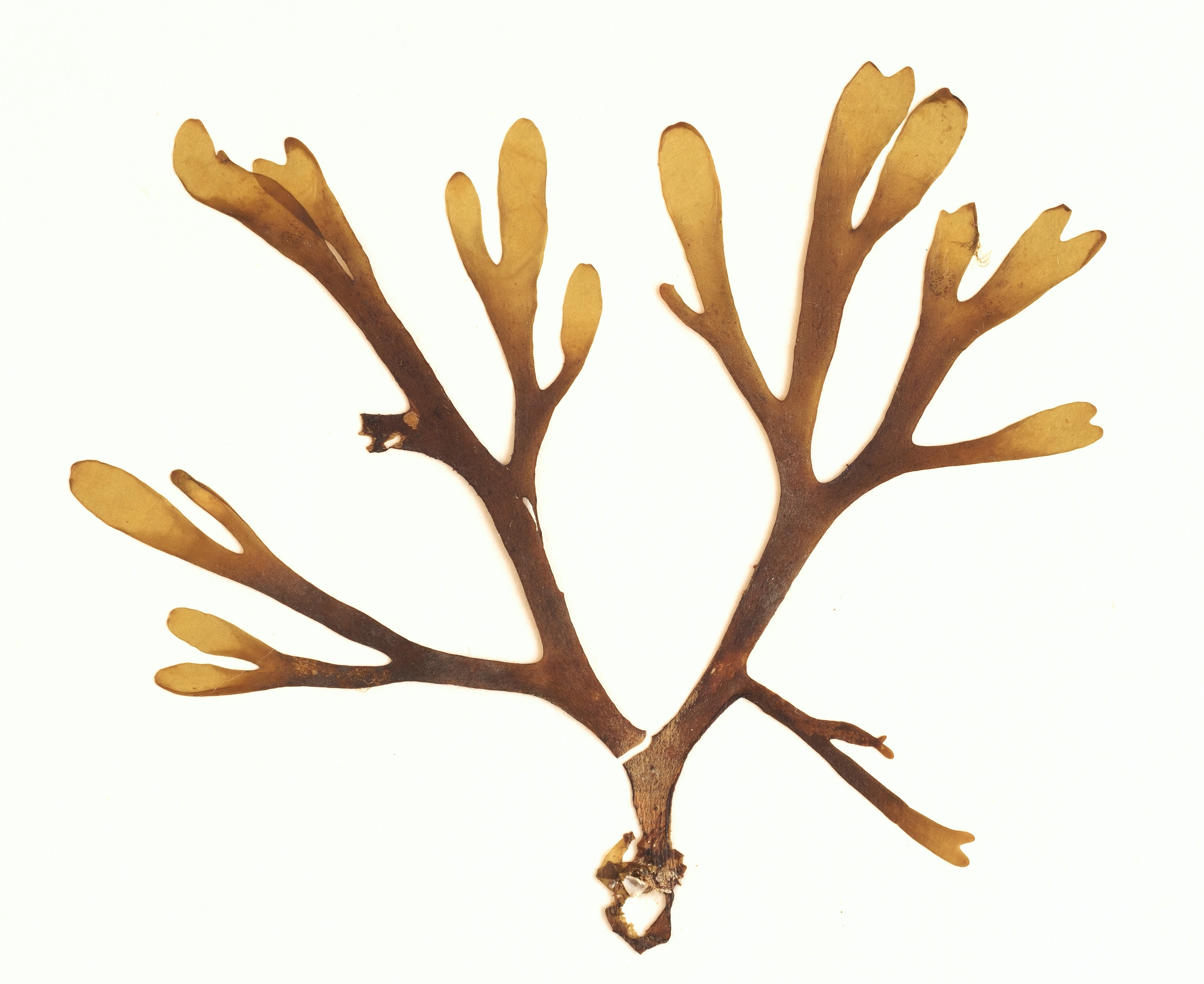
Thallus of Dictyota dichotoma (Garcia, 1988)

=== Internal anatomy ===
The thalli are parenchymatous and are characterized by one or more apical cells that divide into an outer cortical and an inner medullary cell layer which can have several different configurations (e.g. uni-layered cortex with unilayered medulla, uni-layered cortex with multi-layered medulla, etc.).

== Distribution ==
Dictyota is distributed along tropical to temperate waters with species having generally restricted geographic ranges. It is the most abundant genus of brown algae in the Mediterranean Sea as well as the Atlantic coasts of Europe.

== Ecology ==
Species of the genus are commonly found in subtidal to intertidal rocky pools. Seasonality in species' abundances as well as fertility are driven mainly by temperature, photoperiod, and solar radiation. For instance, populations of D. dichotoma in the southern hemisphere are highly abundant for a majority of the year but are largely absent in the warmer months, which is when its northern counterparts are most abundant and fertile.

== Life History ==
Dictyota exhibits an isomorphic life cycle wherein the alternating gametophyte and sporophyte phases appear morphologically similar. This alternation co-occurs with a change in ploidy. The gametophytes produce gametes which undergo fertilization to produce the diploid sporophyte, which then produces sporangia which will release 4 haploid spores through meiosis. Half of the haploid spores will develop into the female gametophytes while the other half will develop into male gametophytes, starting the process over again.

Dictyota is dioecious and reproduces both sexually and asexually. Release of gametes follows a diurnal and lunar periodicity. Gametes are often released 20–30 minutes after first light, with peaks occurring once or twice a month depending on the species. Asexual reproduction may occur via adventitious branching following the loss of the apical meristem.

== Chemical Composition ==
Dictyota is known to have high levels of fatty acids and lipids which makes the genus ideal for use as feedstock. The pigments found in Dictyota are Chlorophyll a, c, fucoxanthin and violaxanthin which are present in a ratio of 13:3:10:1. This ratio may be altered by depth.

== Exploitation/Utilization and Management ==
The genus is not currently cultivated nor harvested on an industrial scale. It is mainly exploited for its secondary metabolites which are known to have anticoagulant, antibacterial, anti-inflammatory properties, among others, making them useful for a wide range of pharmaceutical applications. For instance, there is evidence that methanolic extracts of Dictyota inhibits the butyrylcholinesterase (BuChE) enzyme in humans, which could potentially treat Alzheimer's disease.

Other applications include its use as biofuel - due to the high lipid content of some species - and as supplemental feeds for poultry, cattle, and fish. A study in 2014 found that feeds with D. bartayresiana supplements could potentially reduce in vitro methane production of ruminants by 92.2%, which may have implications for reducing emissions from the agricultural sector.

== Species ==
The genus Dictyota contains the following species:

- Dictyota acutiloba J.Agardh, 1848
- Dictyota adhaerens Noda, 1965
- Dictyota adnata Zanardini, 1878
  - Dictyota adnata f. nana Post
- Dictyota aegerrima (Allender & Kraft) De Clerck, 2006
- Dictyota alternifida J.Agardh, 1894
- Dictyota anastomosans Steen et al.
- Dictyota apiculata var. Agardh Weber-van Bosse
- Dictyota asiatica I.K.Hwang
- Dictyota attenuata P.Crouan & H.Crouan, 1842
- Dictyota bartayresiana J.V.Lamouroux, 1809
  - Dictyota bartayresiana var. divaricata Kützing
- Dictyota bifurca J.Agardh, 1894
- Dictyota binghamiae J.Agardh, 1894
- Dictyota canaliculata O.De Clerck & E.Coppejans, 1997
- Dictyota canariensis (Grunow) Tronholm, 2013
- Dictyota caribaea Hörnig & Schnetter, 1992
  - Dictyota cervicornis f. pseudodichotoma Taylor
  - Dictyota cervicornis f. spiralis Taylor
  - Dictyota ceylanica var. anastomosans Yamada
- Dictyota chalchicueyecanensis Lozano-Orozco & Sentíes
  - Dictyota ciliata var. humilis Grunow
- Dictyota ciliolata Sonder ex Kützing, 1859
- Dictyota concrescens W.R.Taylor, 1945
- Dictyota coriacea (Holmes) I.K.Wang, H.-S.Kim & W.J.Lee, 2004
- Dictyota crenulata J.Agardh, 1847
- Dictyota cribrosa Setchell & N.L.Gardner, 1930
- Dictyota crinita (J.Agardh) Hörnig, Schnetter & Prud'Homme van Reine, 1992
- Dictyota crux
  - Dictyota crux f. parva A.Bachmann
- Dictyota cuneata Dickie, 1874
- Dictyota cyanoloma Tronholm, De Clerck, A.Gómez-Garreta & Rull Lluch, 2010
- Dictyota cymatophila Tronholm, M.Sanson & Afonso-Carrillo, 2010
- Dictyota decumbens (R.W.Ricker) Hörnig, Schnetter & Prud'homme van Reine, 1992
- Dictyota detergenda Kraft, 2009
- Dictyota dhofarensis (Nizamuddin & A.C.Campbell) De Clerck, 2006
- Dictyota dichotoma (Hudson) J.V.Lamouroux, 1809
- Dictyota dichotoma Suhr, 1839
  - Dictyota dichotoma f. angustior Schiffner
  - Dictyota dichotoma var. fimbriata Piccone & Grunow
  - Dictyota dichotoma var. genuina Grunow
  - Dictyota dichotoma var. guinea Grunow
  - Dictyota dichotoma var. inequalis S.F.Gray
  - Dictyota dichotoma var. intricata (C.Agardh) Greville
  - Dictyota dichotoma var. patens
  - Dictyota dichotoma f. proliferans Ercegovic
- Dictyota diemensis Sonder ex Kützing, 1859
- Dictyota dilatata Yamada, 1925
- Dictyota divaricata P.L.Crouan & H.M.Crouan, 1865
- Dictyota dolabellana De Paula, Yoneshigue-Valentin & Teixeira, 2008
- Dictyota dumosa Børgesen, 1935
- Dictyota fasciculata Sperk, 1869
- Dictyota fascida J.Agardh, 1898
  - Dictyota fasciola var. abyssinica J.Agardh
- Dictyota fasciola (Roth) J.V.Lamouroux, 1809
  - Dictyota fasciola var. divergens f. major Schiffner
  - Dictyota fasciola var. divergens f. minor Schiffner
  - Dictyota fasciola var. elongata De Notaris
  - Dictyota fasciola f. major Schiffner
  - Dictyota fasciola f. minor Schiffner
  - Dictyota fasciola var. repens (J.Agardh) Ardissone
- Dictyota fastigiata Sonder, 1845
- Dictyota fenestrata J.Agardh, 1894
- Dictyota flabellata (F.S.Collins) Setchell & N.L.Gardner, 1924
- Dictyota flabellulata Foster & Schiel
- Dictyota flagellifera Kraft, 2009
- Dictyota foliosa J.Agardh, 1892
- Dictyota friabilis Setchell, 1926
- Dictyota furcellata (C.Agardh) Greville, 1830
- Dictyota galapagensis (Farlow) De Clerck, 2006
- Dictyota grossedentata De Clerck & Coppejans, 1999
- Dictyota guajirae Hörnig, Schnetter & J.M.Over, 1992
- Dictyota guineënsis (Kützing) P.L.Crouan & H.M.Crouan, 1878
- Dictyota gunniana (J.Agardh) I.Hörnig, R.Schnetter & Prud'homme van Reine, 1992
- Dictyota hamifera Setchell, 1926
- Dictyota harveyana
- Dictyota hauckiana Nizamuddin, 1975
- Dictyota humifusa Hörnig, Schnetter & Coppejans, 1992
- Dictyota implexa (Desfontaines) J.V.Lamouroux, 1809
- Dictyota indica Anand, 1965
- Dictyota inscripta J.Agardh, 1893
- Dictyota intermedia Zanardini, 1874
- Dictyota jamaicensis W.R.Taylor, 1960
- Dictyota kunthii (C.Agardh) Greville, 1830
- Dictyota laciniata J.V.Lamouroux, 1809
- Dictyota lata J.V.Lamouroux, 1809
  - Dictyota linearis var. campsosticha Montagne
  - Dictyota linearis f. intricata Kützing
  - Dictyota linearis var. major P.Crouan & H.Crouan
  - Dictyota linearis var. minor Sonder
- Dictyota littoralis P.Anand, 1965
- Dictyota liturata J.Agardh, 1848
- Dictyota major W.R.Taylor, 1945
- Dictyota masonii Setchell & N.L.Gardner, 1930
- Dictyota mayae Lozano-Orozco & Sentíes
- Dictyota mediterranea (Schiffner) G.Furnari, 1997
- Dictyota menstrualis (Hoyt) Schnetter, Hörnig & Weber-Peukert, 1987
- Dictyota mertensii (C.Martius) Kützing, 1859
- Dictyota moniliformis (J.Agardh) Hörnig, Schnetter & Prud'homme van Reine, 1992
- Dictyota multifida (J.E.Smith) Bory, 1838
- Dictyota naevosa (Suhr) Montagne, 1840
- Dictyota nigrescens Zanardini, 1878
- Dictyota nigricans J.Agardh, 1882
- Dictyota ocellata J.Agardh, 1894
- Dictyota pachyderma Luan Rixiao & Ding Lanping
- Dictyota paniculata J.Agardh, 1841
- Dictyota papenfussii Lindauer, 1949
  - Dictyota pavonia var. maxima J.V.Lamouroux
- Dictyota pedrochei Lozano-Orozco & Sentíes
- Dictyota pellucida J.Agardh, 1892
- Dictyota penicellata J.V.Lamouroux
- Dictyota phlyctaenodes Montagne, 1852
- Dictyota pinnata (E.Y.Dawson) I.Hörnig, R.Schnetter & Prud'homme van Reine, 1993
- Dictyota pinnatifida Kützing, 1859
  - Dictyota pinnatifida var. rigida Grunow
- Dictyota plantaginea J.V.Lamouroux ex Frauenfeld, 1855
- Dictyota plectens (Allender & Kraft) Kraft, 2009
- Dictyota pleiacantha Tronholm, 2013
- Dictyota polyclada Sonder ex Kützing
- Dictyota pontica Sperk, 1869
- Dictyota pulchella Hörnig & Schnetter, 1988
- Dictyota rhizodes (Turner) J.V.Lamouroux
- Dictyota rigida De Clerck & Coppejans, 1999
- Dictyota robusta J.Agardh, 1894
- Dictyota rotunda C.Agardh, 1820
- Dictyota sandvicensis Sonder, 1859
- Dictyota serrulata J.V.Lamouroux, 1809
- Dictyota spathulata Yamada, 1928
- Dictyota spinulosa J.D.Hooker & Arnott, 1838
- Dictyota spiralis Montagne, 1846
- Dictyota stolonifera E.Y.Dawson, 1962
- Dictyota suhrii (Kützing) I.Hörnig, R.Schnetter & W.F.Prud'homme van Reine, 1992
- Dictyota vieillardii Kützing, 1863
  - Dictyota vieillardii var. filiformis Kützing
- Dictyota virellus Noda, 1971
- Dictyota vittata Kraft, 2009
- Dictyota vivesii M.A.Howe, 1911
