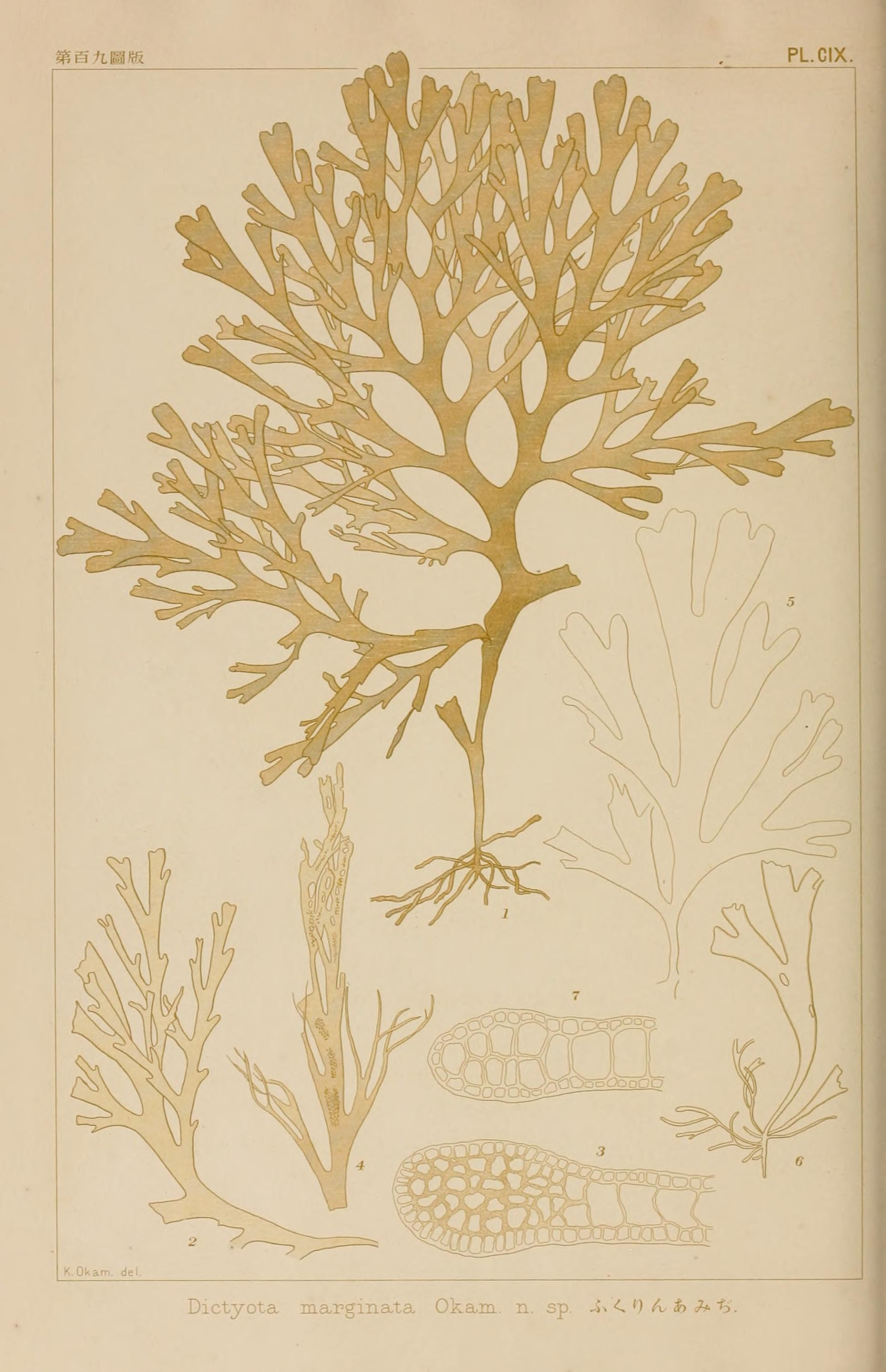

Scientific classification
- Domain: Eukaryota
- Clade: Sar
- Clade: Stramenopiles
- Division: Ochrophyta
- Class: Phaeophyceae
- Order: Dictyotales
- Family: Dictyotaceae
- Genus: Rugulopteryx
- Species: R. okamurae

Binomial name
- Rugulopteryx okamurae (E.Y.Dawson) I.K.Hwang, W.J.Lee & H.S.Kim

Synonyms
- Dictyota marginata Okamura, 1913; Dictyota okamurae (E.Y.Dawson) Hörnig, R.Schnetter & Prud'homme van Reine, 1993; Dilophus marginatus (Okamura) Okamura, 1915; Dilophus okamurae E.Y.Dawson, 1950

= Rugulopteryx okamurae =

Species of brown algae

Rugulopteryx okamurae is a species of brown algae native to the temperate areas of the Northwest Pacific Ocean that has become invasive in the Mediterranean and Northeast Atlantic.

== Description ==
In its natural habitat it lives at depths of between 0.5 and 5 meters, occasionally reaching 15 meters in very transparent waters. The specific epipet pays homage to the Japanese botanist Kintaro Okamura (1867-1945).
