= Rugulopteryx marginata =

Scientific classification
- Domain: Eukaryota
- Clade: Sar
- Clade: Stramenopiles
- Division: Ochrophyta
- Class: Phaeophyceae
- Order: Dictyotales
- Family: Dictyotaceae
- Genus: Rugulopteryx
- Species: R. marginata

Binomial name
- Rugulopteryx marginata (J.Agardh) De Clerck & Coppejans, 2006

Synonyms
- Bicrista marginata (J.Agardh) Kuntze, 1898; Dictyota marginata (J.Agardh) Hörnig, Schnetter & Prud'homme van Reine, 1992; Dictyota rugulosa A.H.S.Lucas, 1935; Dilophus marginatus J.Agardh, 1894

Species of brown algae

Rugulopteryx marginata is a species of brown algae in the family Dictyotaceae.
