= Rugulopteryx radicans =

Scientific classification
- Domain: Eukaryota
- Clade: Sar
- Clade: Stramenopiles
- Phylum: Ochrophyta
- Class: Phaeophyceae
- Order: Dictyotales
- Family: Dictyotaceae
- Genus: Rugulopteryx
- Species: R. radicans

Binomial name
- Rugulopteryx radicans (Harvey) De Clerck & Coppejans, 2006

Synonyms
- Dictyota radicans Harvey, 1855

Species of brown algae

Rugulopteryx radicans is a species of brown algae in the family Dictyotaceae, and the type of the genus Rugulopteryx.
