= Dictyota menstrualis =

Scientific classification
- Domain: Eukaryota
- Clade: Sar
- Clade: Stramenopiles
- Clade: Ochrophyta
- Class: Phaeophyceae
- Order: Dictyotales
- Family: Dictyotaceae
- Genus: Dictyota
- Species: D. menstrualis

Binomial name
- Dictyota menstrualis (Hoyt) Schnetter, Hörnig & Weber-Peukert, 1987

Species of algae

Dictyota menstrualis is a species of brown algae in the family Dictyotaceae. This species is notably found along the coast of Brazil although it is also found elsewhere in the Atlantic Ocean including in the Caribbean Sea and the Gulf of Mexico.
