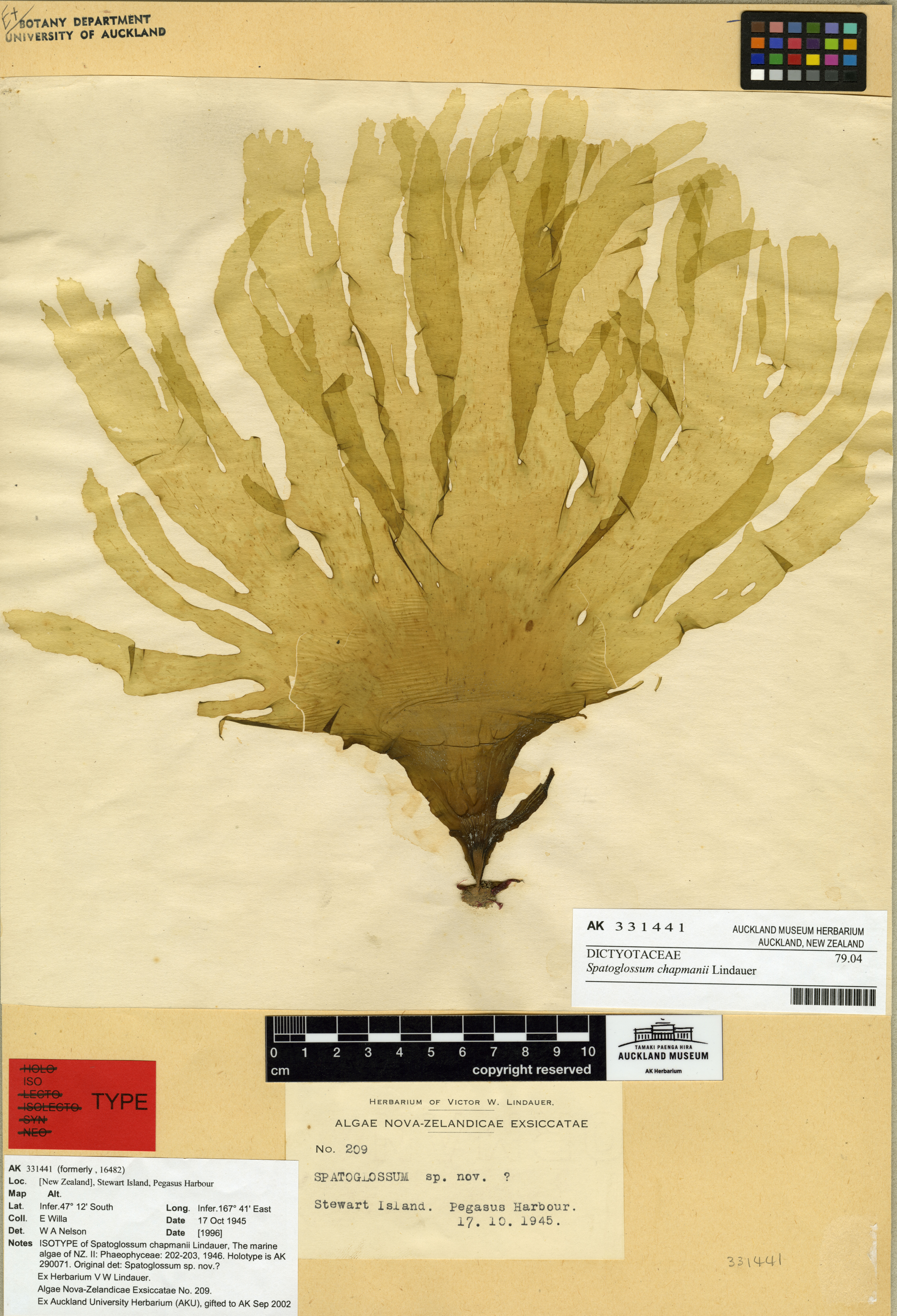
- Spatoglossum chapmanii: AK331441)

Scientific classification
- Domain: Eukaryota
- Supergroup: Stramenopiles
- Division: Ochrophyta
- Class: Phaeophyceae
- Order: Dictyotales
- Family: Dictyotaceae
- Genus: Spatoglossum
- Species: S. chapmanii

Binomial name
- Spatoglossum chapmanii Lindauer, 1949

= Spatoglossum chapmanii =

Species of alga

Spatoglossum chapmanii is a marine brown algal species in the family Dictyotaceae, endemic to New Zealand.

== Description ==
Lindauer described Spatoglossum chapmanii as having an erect, flattened, veinless and membranous to leathery frond that is subpalmate and dichotomously divided, reaching up to 80 cm in height. The species was described from material collected at Twilight Bay on Stewart Island, New Zealand.
