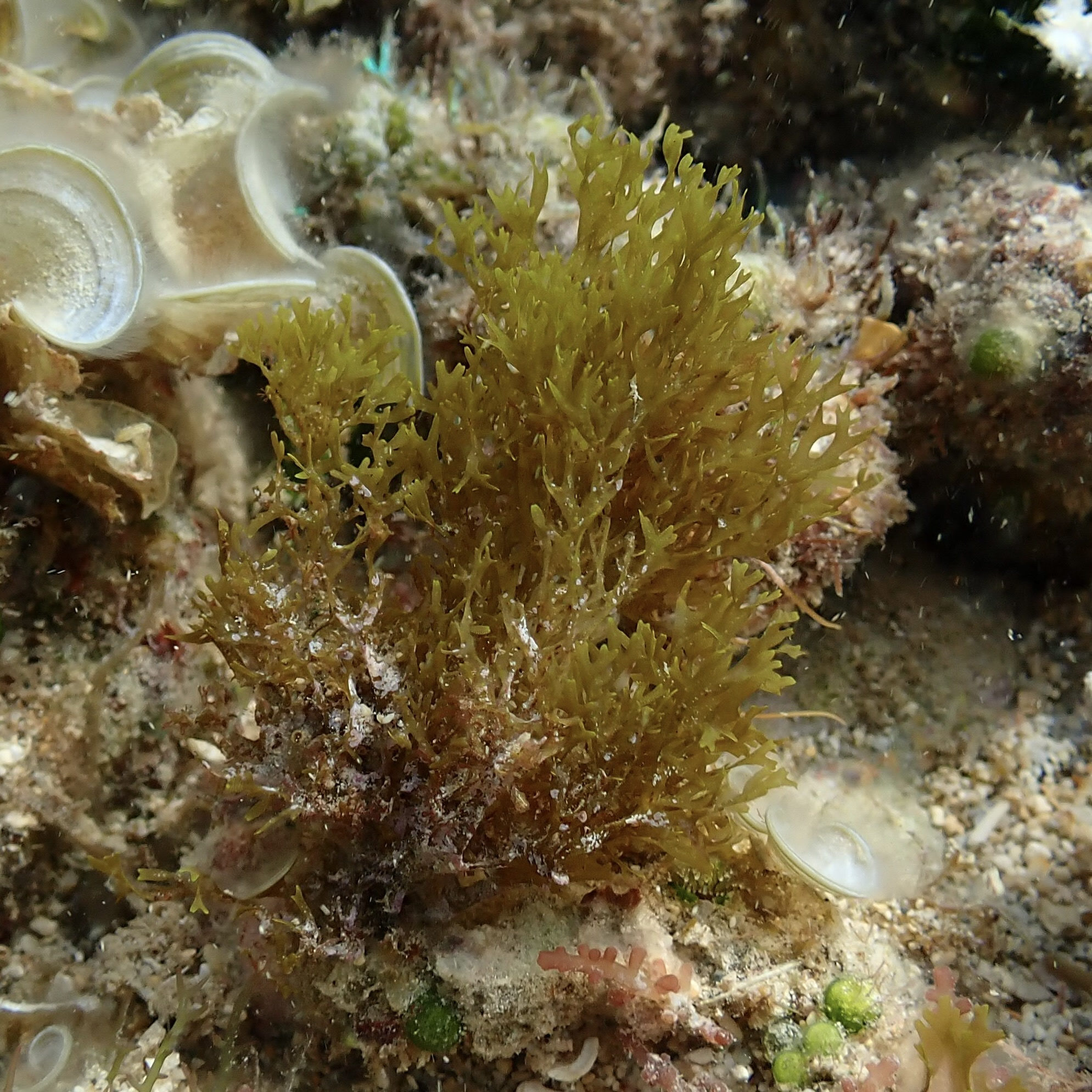
- Dictyota acutiloba

Scientific classification
- Domain: Eukaryota
- Clade: Sar
- Clade: Stramenopiles
- Division: Ochrophyta
- Class: Phaeophyceae
- Order: Dictyotales
- Family: Dictyotaceae
- Genus: Dictyota
- Species: D. acutiloba

Binomial name
- Dictyota acutiloba J.Agardh, 1848

= Dictyota acutiloba =

Species of seaweed

Dictyota acutiloba, the twisted dictyota, is a species of brown seaweed in the family Dictyotaceae. The species has been found in the Mediterranean Sea, and it has been thought that it got there via the Suez Canal.

== Description ==
This seaweed is flexible, although it is typically thin and with its twisted blades gives a wiry look. Like most seaweeds, it smells salty and like the ocean. This species can grow up to 20 cm (7.9 in) depending on the environment.
