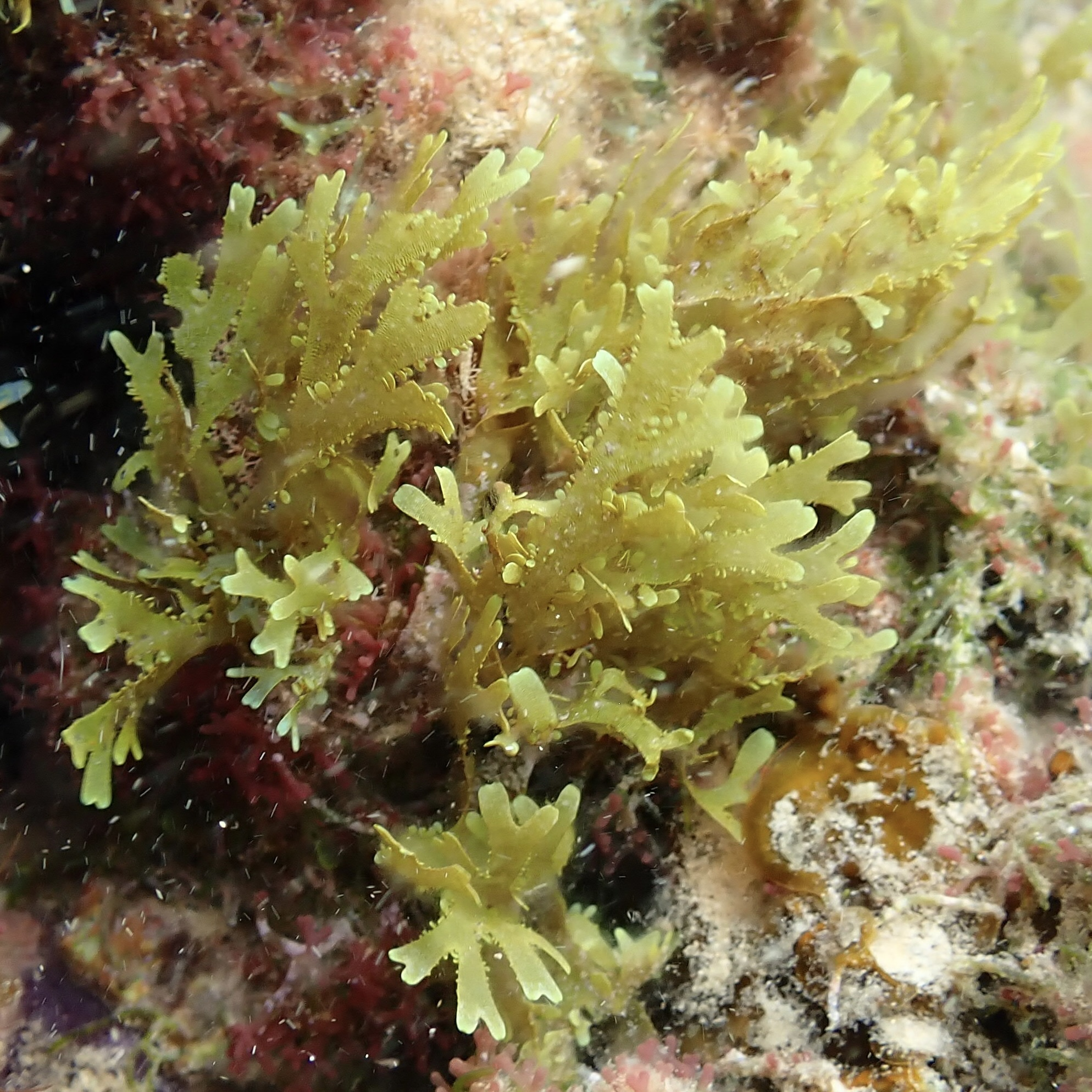
- Dictyota sandvicensis

Scientific classification
- Domain: Eukaryota
- Clade: Sar
- Clade: Stramenopiles
- Division: Ochrophyta
- Class: Phaeophyceae
- Order: Dictyotales
- Family: Dictyotaceae
- Genus: Dictyota
- Species: D. sandvicensis

Binomial name
- Dictyota sandvicensis Sonder, 1859

= Dictyota sandvicensis =

Species of brown seaweed

Dictyota sandvicensis also called limu 'Alani in Hawaiian, is a species of brown seaweed in the family Dictyotaceae endemic to the Hawaiian Islands.

== Description ==
Dictyota sandvicensis reaches up to 15 cm in height, and has a iridescent yellow greenish color. They can be easily spotted from other species of Dictyota in Hawai'i because they have small branches that break out from the edges of the main branches. Dictyota sandvicensis consists of a single basal thallus that is firmly rooted and can support rhizoids. The rhizoids lead to one to several erect fronds 1-5 mm wide.

== Distribution ==
Dictiyota sandvicensis is endemic to Hawaii and occurs throughout the Hawaiian Islands.

== Habitat ==
Dictiyota sandvicensis can be founded in mid- to low-tide pools, on low intertidal benches and on reef flats growing on rocks or as epiphytes on other algae in shallow waters up to 7m depth.

== Nutrition & cultural significance ==
Limu is a regular part of the diet and is considered to contain more vitamins and essential mineral nutrients than other staple food items. Dictyota sandvicensis icontainins proteins, lipids, carbohydrates, minerals, and vitamins and has a caloric content of over cal g-1 ash-free dry weight. In Hawaii, D. sandvicensis is one of many species of limu that have traditionally been harvested from the shores.
