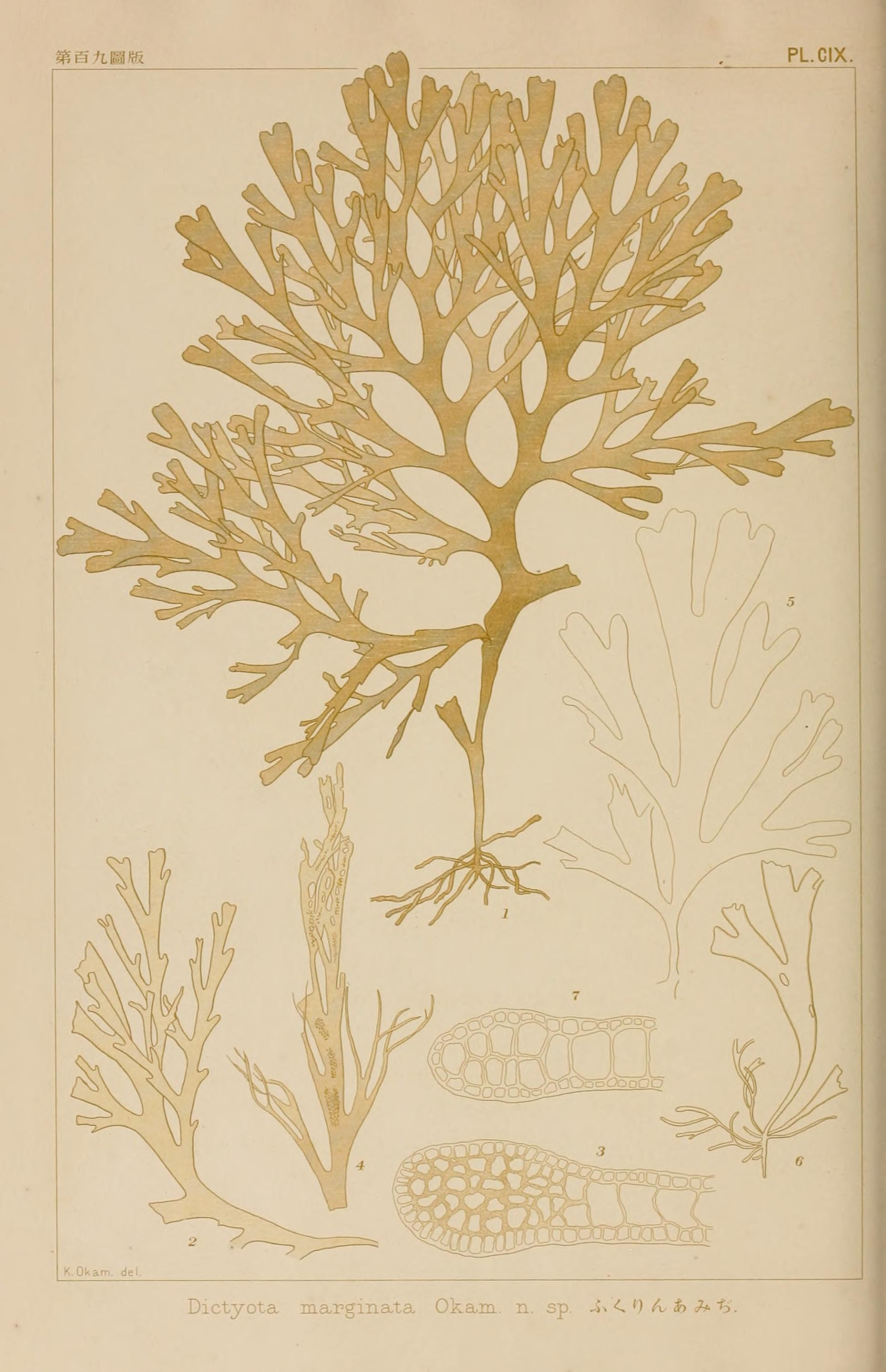
- Rugulopteryx okamurae

Scientific classification
- Domain: Eukaryota
- Clade: Sar
- Clade: Stramenopiles
- Division: Ochrophyta
- Class: Phaeophyceae
- Order: Dictyotales
- Family: Dictyotaceae
- Genus: Rugulopteryx; De Clerck & Coppejans, 2006

Type species
- Rugulopteryx radicans (Harvey) De Clerck & Coppejans

Species
- See text

= Rugulopteryx =

Genus of seaweed in the family Dictyotaceae

Rugulopteryx is a genus of brown algae in the family Dictyotaceae.

== Species ==
The genus Rugulopteryx contains the following species:

- Rugulopteryx marginata (J.Agardh) De Clerck & Coppejans, 2006
- Rugulopteryx okamurae (E.Y.Dawson) I.K.Hwang, W.J.Lee & H.S.Kim, 2009
- Rugulopteryx radicans (Harvey) De Clerck & Coppejans, 2006
- Rugulopteryx suhrii (Kützing) De Clerck & Coppejans, 2006
