= Dictyota spiralis =

Scientific classification
- Domain: Eukaryota
- Clade: Diaphoretickes
- Clade: SAR
- Clade: Stramenopiles
- Phylum: Gyrista
- Subphylum: Ochrophytina
- Class: Phaeophyceae
- Order: Dictyotales
- Family: Dictyotaceae
- Genus: Dictyota
- Species: D. spiralis

Binomial name
- Dictyota spiralis Montagne, 1846

Synonyms
- Dictyota ligulata Kützing, 1847; Dilophus ligulatus (Kützing) Feldmann, 1937; Dilophus spiralis (Montagne) G.Hamel, 1939; Neurocarpus appendiculatus Schousboe, 1892; Neurocarpus complanatus Schousboe, 1892; Neurocarpus crispatus Schousboe, 1892

Species of brown algae

Dictyota spiralis is a species of brown alga found in the temperate eastern Atlantic Ocean and the Mediterranean Sea.

== Description ==
The thallus of Dictyota spiralis is a yellowish-brown colour, sometimes with a greenish iridescent tip. It forms clumps of membranous, flattened, ribbon-like fronds with few branches, up to 15 cm (6 in) long and 4 mm (0.2 in) wide. The clump is anchored to the seabed by stolons.
