= Rugulopteryx suhrii =

Scientific classification
- Domain: Eukaryota
- Clade: Sar
- Clade: Stramenopiles
- Division: Ochrophyta
- Class: Phaeophyceae
- Order: Dictyotales
- Family: Dictyotaceae
- Genus: Rugulopteryx
- Species: R. suhrii

Binomial name
- Rugulopteryx suhrii (Kützing) De Clerck & Coppejans, 2006

Synonyms
- Stoechospermum suhrii Kützing, 1859; Dictyota marginata (J.Agardh) J.E. Areschoug, 1851; Dictyota prolifera Suhr, 1839; Dictyota suhrii G.Murray, 1888; Dilophus suhrii (Kützing) Papenfuss, 1940

Species of brown algae

Rugulopteryx suhrii is a species of brown algae in the family Dictyotaceae.
