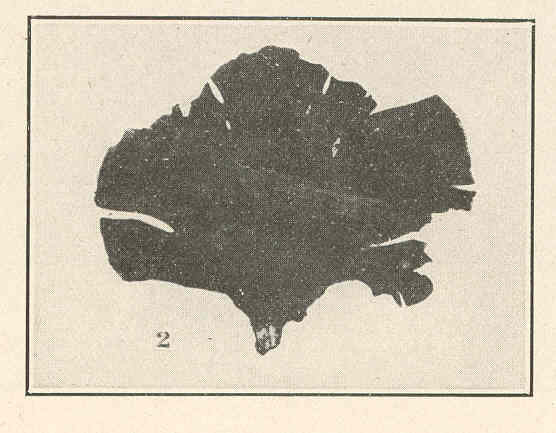
- Scientific Sample of Zonaria Variegata. Credit: William Dana Hoyt, 1921

Scientific classification
- Domain: Eukaryota
- Clade: Sar
- Clade: Stramenopiles
- Division: Ochrophyta
- Class: Phaeophyceae
- Order: Dictyotales
- Family: Dictyotaceae
- Genus: Lobophora
- Species: L. variegata

Binomial name
- Lobophora variegata J.V.Lamouroux, 1817

Synonyms
- Dictyota variegata J.V.Lamouroux, 1809; Gymnosorus nigrescens (Sonder) J.Agardh, 1894; Gymnosorus variegatus (J.V.Lamouroux) J.Agardh, 1894; Lobophora nigrescens J.Agardh, 1894; Orthosorus nigrescens (Sonder) Trevisan, 1849; Pocockiella nigrescens (Sonder) Papenfuss, 1943; Pocockiella variegata (J.V.Lamouroux) Papenfuss, 1943; Spatoglossum nigrescens (Sonder) Kützing, 1849; Spatoglossum variegatum (J.V.Lamouroux) Kützing, 1849; Stypopodium laciniatum Kützing, 1859; Zonaria latissima Sonder ex Kützing, 1859; Zonaria nigrescens Sonder, 1845; Zonaria variegata (J.V.Lamouroux) C.Agardh, 1817

= Lobophora variegata =

Species of algae

Lobophora variegata is a species of small thalloid brown alga which grows intertidally or in shallow water in tropical and warm temperate seas. It has three basic forms, being sometimes ruffled, sometimes reclining and sometimes encrusting, and each form is typically found in a different habitat. This seaweed occurs worldwide. It is the type species of the genus Lobophora, the type locality being the Antilles in the West Indies.

== Description ==
Lobophora variegata has three different morphological forms; an erect ruffled form, a decumbent or reclining form which grows flattened against the substrate and an encrusting form. Each of these forms may dominate its habitat. This seaweed is generally greenish-brown or pale brown. The sporangial sori are scattered across both surfaces of the thalli (fronds). The ruffled form grows in ball-like clumps of wavy fronds as a result of the continued growth of the lateral blades. It is most often found in sandy areas and among turtle grass (Thalassia testudinem). It is usually anchored to the seabed or the prop roots of the red mangrove Rhizophora mangle by a holdfast, but it sometimes forms loose masses which roll about with the movement of the water.

The decumbent form grows in overlapping flat blades which may cover large areas of the seabed with a roof-tile like pattern. It is most abundant on back reefs, on shallow patch reefs and on the lower surfaces of hard corals. In deeper water it forms thin semicircular plates projecting horizontally from vertical rock faces or from under overhangs.

The encrusting form resembles Ralfsia and consists of irregular low-growing lobes attached to the substrate by a matted, rhizoidal holdfast. It grows in very shallow water on coral rubble, red mangrove prop roots and the waterlogged soils around mangroves.

== Distribution ==
Lobophora variegata is widely distributed in tropical and warm temperate marine waters, from the intertidal zone down to at least 90 metres (300 ft). It is common in the western Atlantic Ocean, the Caribbean Sea and Gulf of Mexico, its range extending from Bermuda and North Carolina to Brazil. It also occurs in European waters, the Mediterranean Sea, the Azores, around the coasts of southern and eastern Africa, the Indian Ocean islands, the coasts of southeastern and southwestern Asia, the Pacific Ocean islands, northern Australia and New Zealand.

== Ecology ==
Lobophora variegata is one of the commonest species of brown algae in the Caribbean area and is often abundant in shaded areas, under overhangs and in caves. It forms part of the diet of many fish and various herbivorous invertebrates. It is often covered in sediment and many epiphytes grow on the surface of the thalli.

In feeding trials in Belize it has been shown that the three different forms of this seaweed have different degrees of palatability to herbivorous fish and crabs (Mithraculus sculptus). The ruffled form is the most palatable and is only found to any extent in areas with low grazing pressure such as seagrass meadows. The decumbent form is relatively unattractive to fish and crabs but is eaten in areas with high grazing pressure. It is also eaten intensively by sea urchins such as Diadema antillarum. The encrusting form is unpalatable to all the herbivores and is principally found in areas with high grazing pressure. Lobophora variegata is a widespread and successful species and it is suggested that the three forms have developed in response to variations in grazing pressure.

The tissues of Lobophora variegata and other brown algae contain phlorotannins, unpalatable phenolic compounds that are thought to deter herbivory. These secondary metabolites are more abundant in Lobophora variegata growing in nutrient-poor water with a low nitrogen content than elsewhere.
