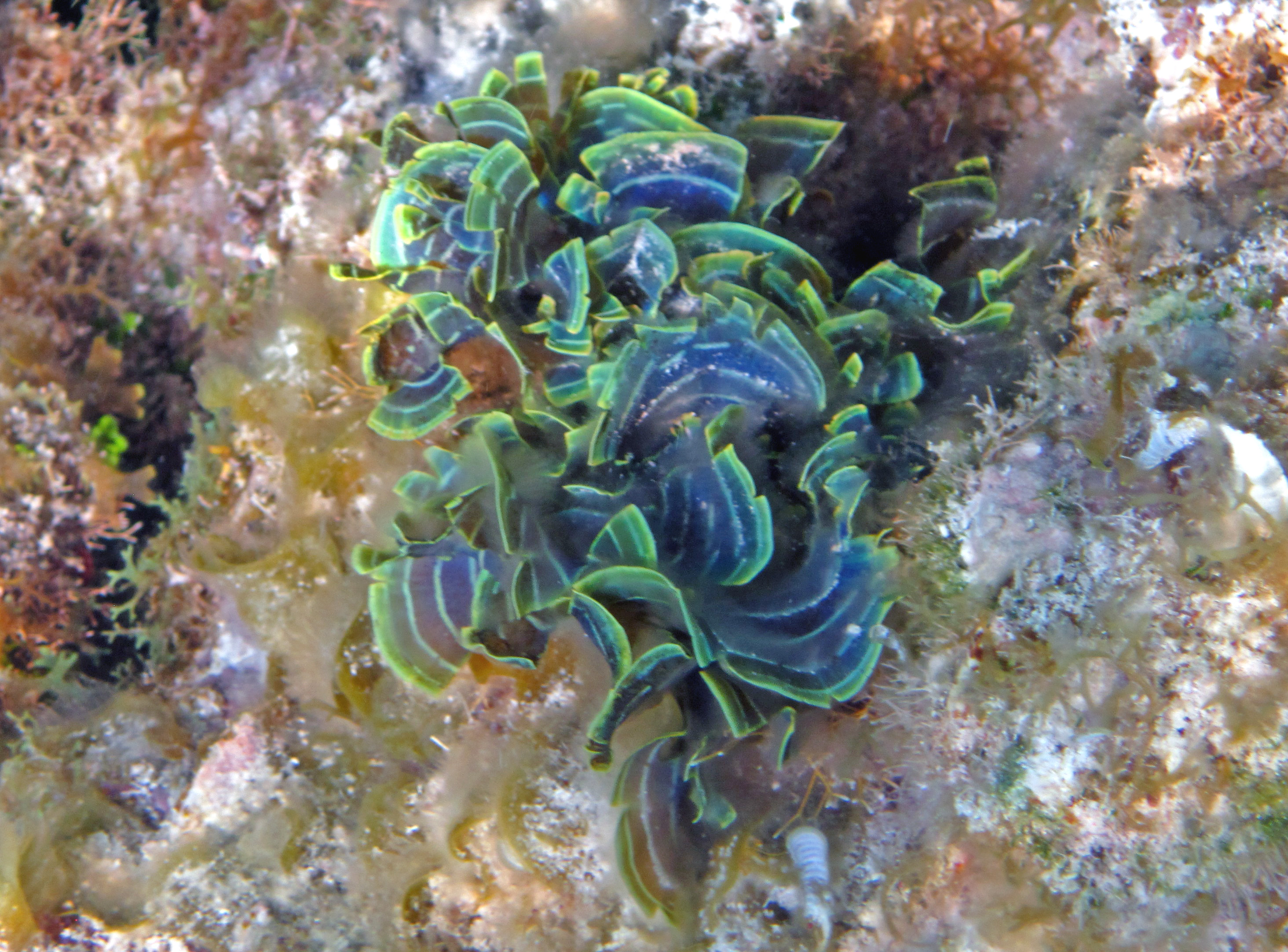

Scientific classification
- Domain: Eukaryota
- Clade: Diaphoretickes
- Clade: SAR
- Clade: Stramenopiles
- Phylum: Gyrista
- Subphylum: Ochrophytina
- Class: Phaeophyceae
- Order: Dictyotales
- Family: Dictyotaceae
- Genus: Padina
- Species: P. boergesenii

Binomial name
- Padina boergesenii Allender & Kraft, 1983

= Padina boergesenii =

Species of alga

Padina boergesenii, commonly known as the leafy rolled-blade alga, is a species of small brown alga found in the tropical and subtropical western Atlantic Ocean, the Mediterranean Sea, and the Pacific Ocean. This seaweed was named in honour of the Danish botanist and phycologist Frederik Børgesen.

== Description ==
Padina boergesenii is a distinctive small brown alga with rounded fronds growing to a length and diameter of 4 to 6 cm (1.6 to 2.4 in). Fronds are thin, leafy, and flat, with narrow or wide lobes, and grow on short stems from a fibrous, bulbous holdfast. They are moderately calcified on the underside and are usually pale brown or tan. The fronds are either two or three cells thick, but the bases are usually three cells thick. The surface of the fronds bear many short hairs, giving them a matted appearance.

== Distribution ==
P. boergesenii has a wide but scattered presence in shallow water in tropical, subtropical, and warm temperate oceans. In Australia, it is known only from Lord Howe Island. Other locations where this alga occurs include Mauritius, India, and Brazil. The type locality is the United States Virgin Islands, and the maximum depth at which it grows is 1 m (3 ft).

== Ecology ==
This seaweed reproduces by spore-producing asexual reproduction. The fronds produce tetraspores in concentric bands a millimetre (0.04 in) or so wide, alternately on the upper and lower surfaces of the fronds, closely situated between bands of hairs. The sporangia within the sori mature at differing rates, so that the mature sorus contains spores at very different stages of development.

The species has been investigated for use as a bioindicator of heavy metal contamination; it concentrated iron and manganese by several orders of magnitude and was also successful in detecting other metals such as cadmium and zinc at trace concentrations.
