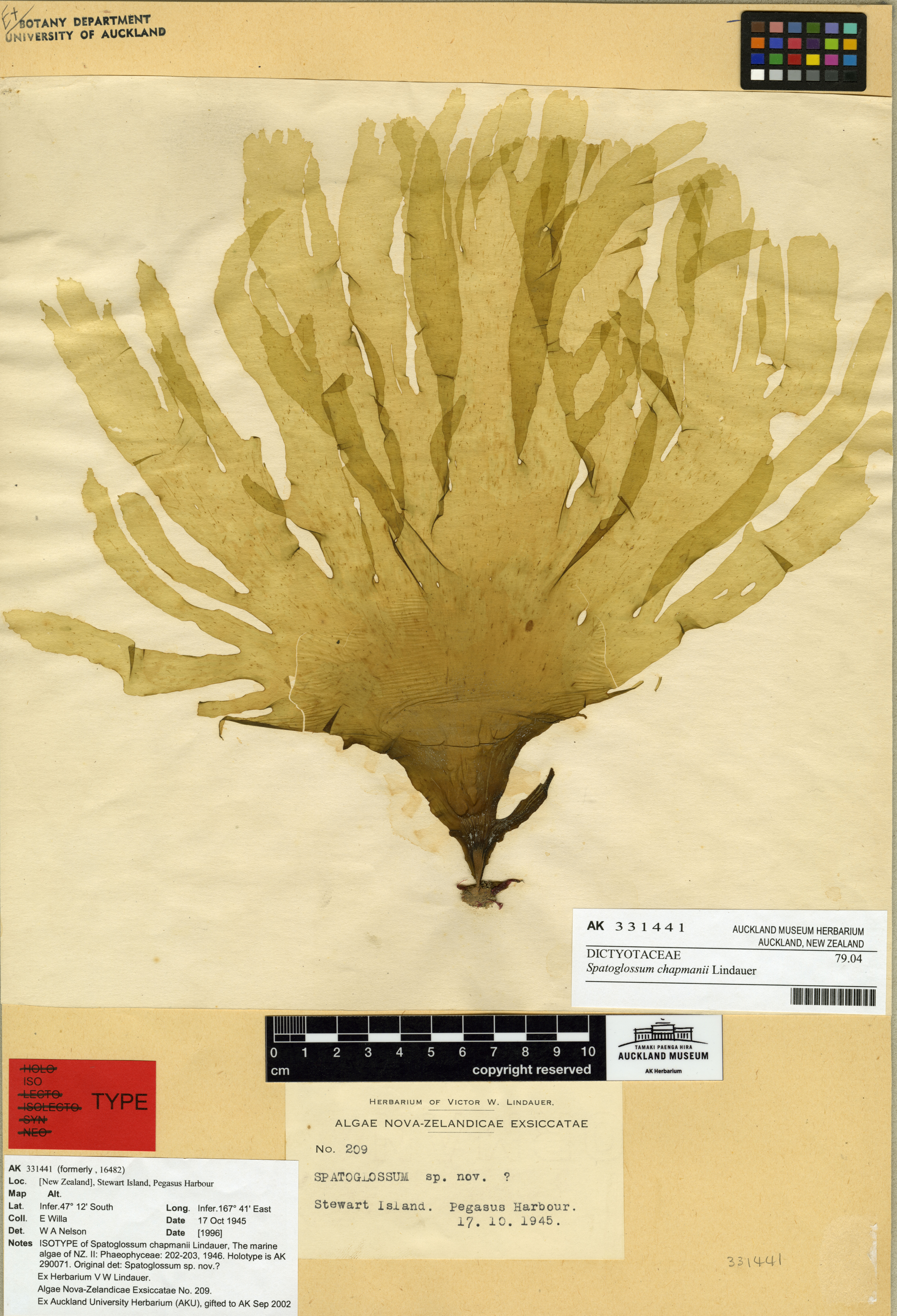
- Spatoglossum chapmanii: AK331441)
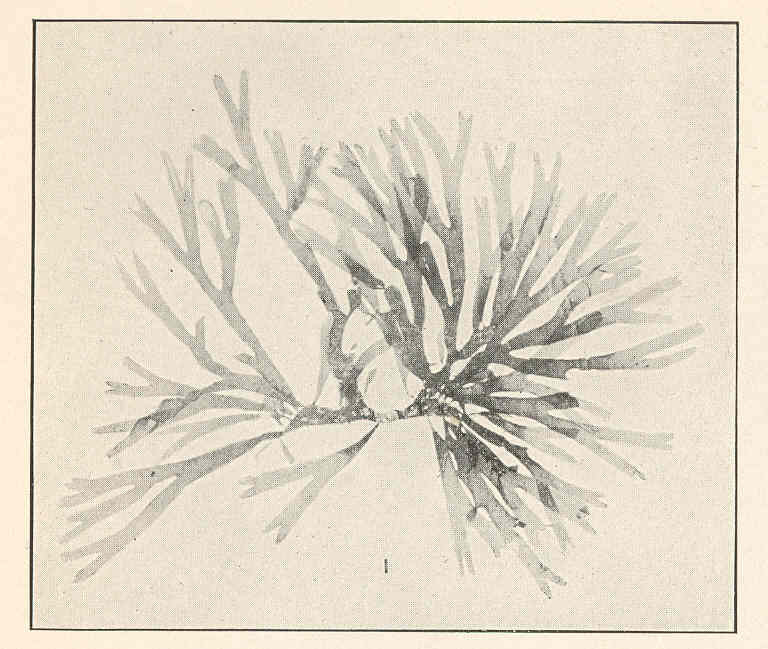
- Spatoglossum schroederi

Scientific classification
- Domain: Eukaryota
- Clade: Diaphoretickes
- Clade: SAR
- Clade: Stramenopiles
- Phylum: Gyrista
- Subphylum: Ochrophytina
- Class: Phaeophyceae
- Order: Dictyotales
- Family: Dictyotaceae
- Genus: Spatoglossum; Kützing, 1843

Type species
- Spatoglossum solierii (Chauvin ex Montagne) Kützing

Species
- See text

= Spatoglossum =

Genus of algae

Spatoglossum is a marine brown algal genus in the family Dictyotaceae, with a worldwide distribution

Its first valid description was given by Friedrich Kützing in 1843.

== Some accepted species ==
According to Algaebase:

- Spatoglossum asperum J.Agardh
- Spatoglossum australasicum Kützing
- Spatoglossum chapmanii Lindauer
- Spatoglossum chaudhrianum P.Anand
- Spatoglossum crassum J.Tanaka
- Spatoglossum crispatum M.Howe
- Spatoglossum dichotomum C.K.Tseng & Lu Baoren
- Spatoglossum ecuadoreanum W.R.Taylor
- Spatoglossum flabelliforme Kützing
- Spatoglossum howellii Setchell & N.L.Gardner
- Spatoglossum intermedium Kützing
- Spatoglossum lanceolatum E.Y.Dawson
- Spatoglossum latum J.Tanaka
- Spatoglossum macrodontum J.Agardh
- Spatoglossum membranaceum Kraft
- Spatoglossum schmittii W.R.Taylor
- Spatoglossum schroederi (C.Agardh) Kützing
- Spatoglossum solieri (Chauvin ex Montagne) Kützing - (type)
- Spatoglossum spanneri (Meneghini) Meneghini
- Spatoglossum stipitatum (Tanaka & K.Nozawa) Bittner et al.
- Spatoglossum subflabellatum E.Y.Dawson
- Spatoglossum variabile Figari & De Notaris
- Spatoglossum vietnamense Pham-Hoàng Hô
