= Dictyopteris delicatula =

Scientific classification
- Domain: Eukaryota
- Clade: Sar
- Clade: Stramenopiles
- Division: Ochrophyta
- Class: Phaeophyceae
- Order: Dictyotales
- Family: Dictyotaceae
- Genus: Dictyopteris
- Species: D. delicatula

Binomial name
- Dictyopteris delicatula J.V.Lamouroux, 1809

Synonyms
- Dictyopteris hauckiana Möbius, 1889

Species of algae

Dictyopteris delicatula is a species of brown algae in the family Dictyotaceae. Its name is Latin for delicate. Like other members of its genus, Dictyopteris delicatula has been researched for possible blue economy applications.
