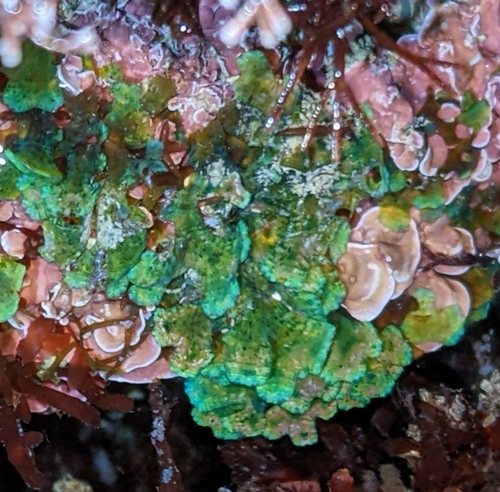
- Dictyota friabilis (blue-green) with other algae

Scientific classification
- Domain: Eukaryota
- Clade: Sar
- Clade: Stramenopiles
- Phylum: Ochrophyta
- Class: Phaeophyceae
- Order: Dictyotales
- Family: Dictyotaceae
- Genus: Dictyota
- Species: D. friabilis

Binomial name
- Dictyota friabilis Setchell, 1926

= Dictyota friabilis =

Species of seaweed

Dictyota friabilis is a species of brown seaweed in the family Dictyotaceae. It has been found around the world in tropical and subtropical climates, including Hawaii, Puerto Rico, and the Gulf of Oman. There are different medical studies involving Dictyota friabilis for use in human application.

== Description ==
Dictyota friabilis has Y-shaped branching tips and is iridescent which makes it glow bluish green. Dictyota friabilis can grow to between 1.2 and 2 in (30 and 51 mm) in size with a frond span of 5 mm (0.20 in).

== Distribution ==
Dictyota friabilis in tropical and subtropical climates worldwide, including Hawaii, Puerto Rico and the Gulf of Oman.

== Habitat ==
Dictyota friabilis inhabits coastal areas at depths of up to 53 m (174 ft).

== Human use ==
There have been a few studies with the goals of using Dictyota friabilis for medical purposes. One study used dolabelladienetriol, a compound acquired from the species, to reduce the replication of HIV-1. Another study found that there were compounds that had large variation on cancer cells depending on the season, which may be due to the amount of energy being acquired from photosynthesis.
