= Coppejans =

Coppejans is a surname. Notable people with the surname include:

- Kimmer Coppejans (born 1994), Belgian tennis player
- Paul Coppejans (1933–2018), Belgian pole vaulter
