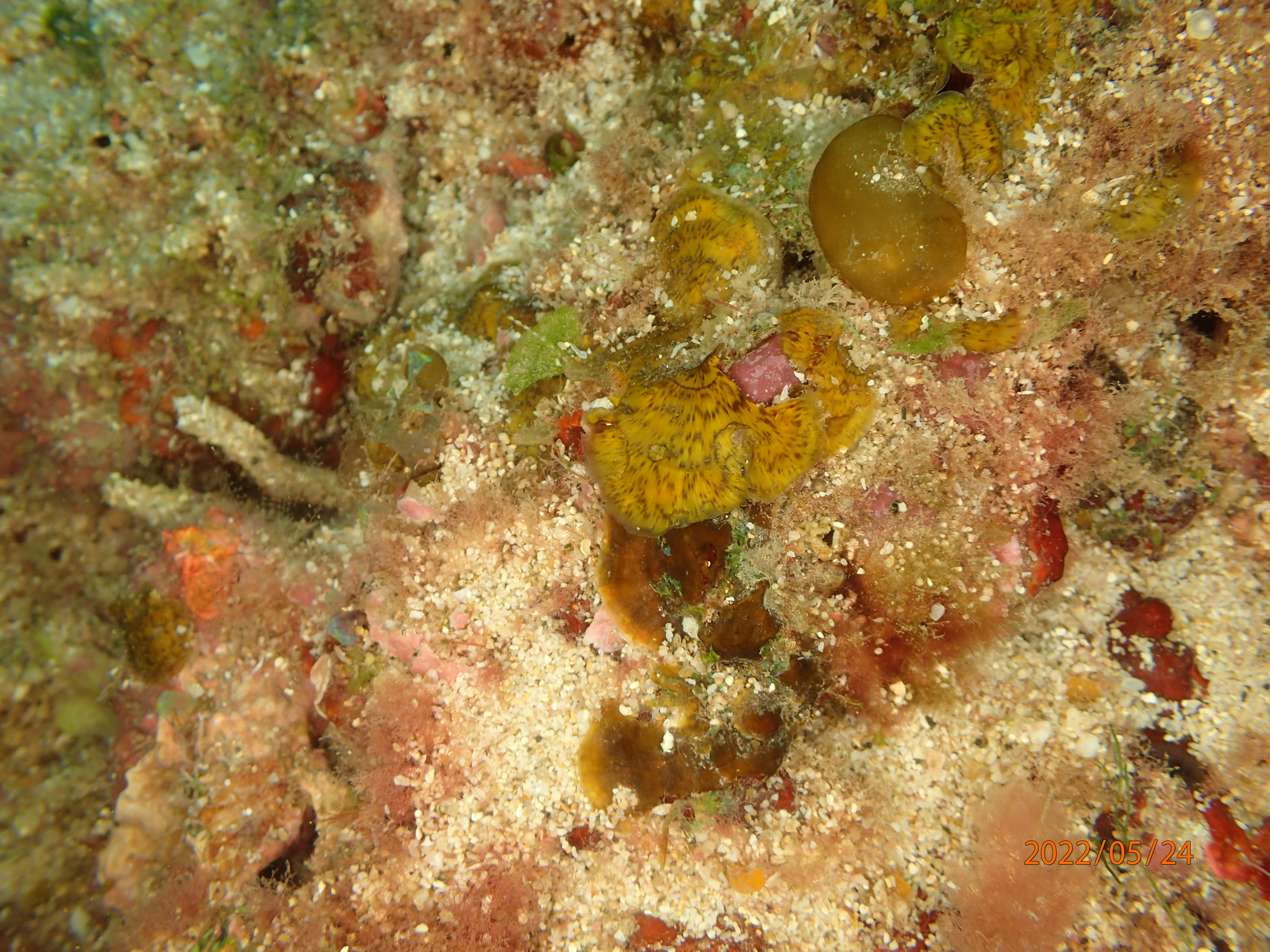
- Lobophora sp. from Vietnam

Scientific classification
- Domain: Eukaryota
- Clade: Sar
- Clade: Stramenopiles
- Division: Ochrophyta
- Class: Phaeophyceae
- Order: Dictyotales
- Family: Dictyotaceae
- Genus: Lobophora; J. Agardh, 1817

Species
- See text

Synonyms
- Gymnosorus J.Agardh, 1894 Pocockiella Papenfuss, 1943

= Lobophora (alga) =

Genus of brown algae

Lobophora is a genus of thalloid brown seaweed of the Phylum Ochrophyta; Class Phaeophyceae.

== Taxonomy and nomenclature ==
The genus Lobophora belongs to the Order Dictyotales; Family Dictyotaceae, and additionally to the Tribe of Zonarieae.

Currently, there are a total of seventy-one (71) taxonomically accepted species belonging to this genus:

- Lobophora abaculusa C.W.Vieira, Payri & De Clerck
- Lobophora abscondita C.W.Vieira, Payri & De Clerck
- Lobophora adpressa O.Camacho & C.Fernández-García
- Lobophora africana C.W.Vieira & M.Zubia
- Lobophora agardhii Payri & C.W.Vieira
- Lobophora antsirananaensis Viera & Rasoamanendrika
- Lobophora asiatica Z.Sun, Ji.Tanaka & H.Kawai
- Lobophora astrolabeae C.W.Vieira & Payri
- Lobophora bandeirae C.W.Vieira, DeClerk & F.Leliaert
- Lobophora boudeuseae C.W.Vieira & Payri
- Lobophora boussoleae C.W.Vieira & Payri
- Lobophora brooksii D.L.Ballantine & J.N.Norris
- Lobophora caboverdeana C.W.Vieira & C.H.Almada
- Lobophora canariensis (Sauvageau) C.W.Vieira, De Clerck & Payri
- Lobophora ceylanica (Harvey ex E.S.Barton) C.W.Vieira, De Clerck & Payri
- Lobophora challengeriae C.W.Vieira
- Lobophora colombiana O.Comacho & Fredericq
- Lobophora coquilleae C.W.Vieira
- Lobophora crispata O.Camacho & Fredericq
- Lobophora dagamae C.W.Viera
- Lobophora delicata Camacho & Fredericq
- Lobophora dichotoma (R.H.Simons) P.C.Silva
- Lobophora dickiei Payri & C.W.Vieira
- Lobophora dimorpha C.W.Vieira, Payri & De Clerck
- Lobophora dispersa Camacho, Freshwater & Fredericq
- Lobophora endeavouriae C.W.Vieira
- Lobophora erythraea C.W.Vieira
- Lobophora esperanceae C.W.Vieira
- Lobophora etoileae C.W.Vieira
- Lobophora evanii C.W.Vieira & Rasoamanendrika
- Lobophora flabellata C.W.Vieira, De Clerck, R.J.Anderson & J.J.Bolton
- Lobophora garyi C.W.Vieira & Rasoamanendrika
- Lobophora gibbera C.W.Vieira, Payri & De Clerck
- Lobophora gloriosa C.W.Vieira & M.Zubia
- Lobophora hederacea C.W.Vieira, Payri & De Clerck
- Lobophora henae C.W.Vieira & Rasoamanendrika
- Lobophora indica V.Krishnamurthy & M.Baluswami
- Lobophora variegata var. indica Umamaheswara Rao
- Lobophora isselii (Piccone & Grunow) C.W.Vieira, De Clerck & Payri
- Lobophora kimiae C.W.Vieira & Rasoamanendrika
- Lobophora lamourouxii Payri & C.W.Vieira
- Lobophora lessepsiana C.W.Vieira
- Lobophora lubaoreniana Luan Rixiao & Ding Lanping
- Lobophora madagascariensis C.W.Vieira & Rasoamanendrika
- Lobophora maldivensis C.W.Vieira & C.Payri
- Lobophora minima V.Krishnamurthy & M.Baluswami
- Lobophora variegata var. minima Umamaheswara Rao
- Lobophora monticola C.W.Vieira, Payri & De Clerck
- Lobophora nigrescens J.Agardh
- Lobophora novae C.W.Vieira & M.Zubia
- Lobophora obscura (Dickie) C.W.Vieira, De Clerck & Payri
- Lobophora pachyventera Z.Sun, P.-E.Lim, Ji.Tanaka & H.Kawai
- Lobophora pacifica (Setchell) C.W.Vieira, De Clerck & Payri
- Lobophora panamensis O.Camacho, C.Fernández-García & Fredericq
- Lobophora papenfussii (W.R.Taylor) Farghaly
- Lobophora petila C.W.Vieira, Payri & De Clerck
- Lobophora providenceae C.W.Vieira
- Lobophora rechercheae C.W.Vieira
- Lobophora richardii C.W.Vieira & Payri
- Lobophora rickeri Kraft
- Lobophora rosacea C.W.Vieira, Payri & De Clerck
- Lobophora schneideri C.W.Vieira
- Lobophora setchellii C.W.Vieira & Payri
- Lobophora soaresii CW.Vieira & F.A.Rasoamanendrika
- Lobophora sonderi C.W.Vieira, De Clerck & Payri
- Lobophora tortugensis O.Camancho & Fredericq
- Lobophora tsengii D.Tien & Z.Sun
- Lobophora undulata C.W.Vieira, Payri & De Clerck
- Lobophora variegata (J.V.Lamouroux) Womersley ex E.C.Oliveira
- Lobophora zmaragdina C.W.Vieira & C.Payri

== General morphological characteristics ==
=== Thalli ===
Thalli are foliose or fan-shaped and possess different growth morphologies: decumbent, procumbent, crustose, conk-like (shelf-like), fasciculate, and stipitate, depending on species and habitat. Thalli arises from matted rhizoidal holdfast with branched fronds displaying broadly flabellate to irregularly branched forms. Algal hairs are arranged in concentric lines or scattered turf. Size can reach up to 20 cm long. Coloration are commonly light brown to dark-brown.

=== Cellular structure (internal morphology) ===
Thalli is 7-12 cells thick, with the outermost layers composed of cortical cells overlying innermost layer of larger medullary cells. Medullary cells usually exhibit uniform sized except for the larger central cells. Discoid chloroplasts are found at the cortical layers.

=== Reproductive structures ===
The sporangial sori of Lobophora are either scattered or in concentric bands found at the surface of the thallus They are characteristically indusiated but without paraphyses. Sporangia without a basal stalk cell produce up to eight (8) spores. Oogonia are found in sori on both side of the frond surfaces.

== Life history ==
The life history of Lobophora is currently unknown. But it may have similar stages with other members from Dictyotaceae Family.

== Distribution and habitat ==
The genus Lobophora are found throughout the pantropical and even temperate regions. They are found growing on solid substrate (rocks) at intertidal (some are wave-exposed) to subtidal areas of rocky-reef habitats.

== Ecology and impacts ==
Seaweeds, such as Lobophora are naturally occurring in coral reefs. Under normal conditions, the interactions between Genus Lobophora and corals pose no threat and can co-exist in an ecosystem. This is attributed to the control of algal populations by coral chemical defense and herbivory. However, when these contributing control factors become unbalanced, Lobophora and other associated seaweeds become opportunistic in taking over reefs (i.e. increasing spatial cover) and by density-dependent negative feedback, prevents corals from settling on substrate. However, as mentioned earlier, Lobophora a species-rich group and certain individuals have different growth patterns, interactions, and habitat-preferences. Understanding and determining its taxa is utmost important.

Because of capacity of seaweeds, such as Lobophora to occupy large spatial habitats, particularly in degraded reefs, they can have an impact on the chances of coral larvae to settle on a substrate. Lobophora can inhibit coral settlement, however, its effect can decrease later on life history stages because they have no effect on growing coral nubbins. Chances of coral larvae to settle in degraded reef followed by disturbance may be challenging.

As mentioned, Lobophora are highly preferred by herbivores particularly fish. Growth morphological defenses have been developed by this group to become unpalatable to its herbivores. Encrust (crustose) forming Lobophora, such as L. variegata are dominant in areas with high concentration of herbivorous fish and sea urchin, compare to other seaweeds having a foliose or decumbent morphologies. This indicates that high herbivory activities in the area may influence the defense mechanisms of seaweeds, in the case of Lobophora, its specific growth morphologies.

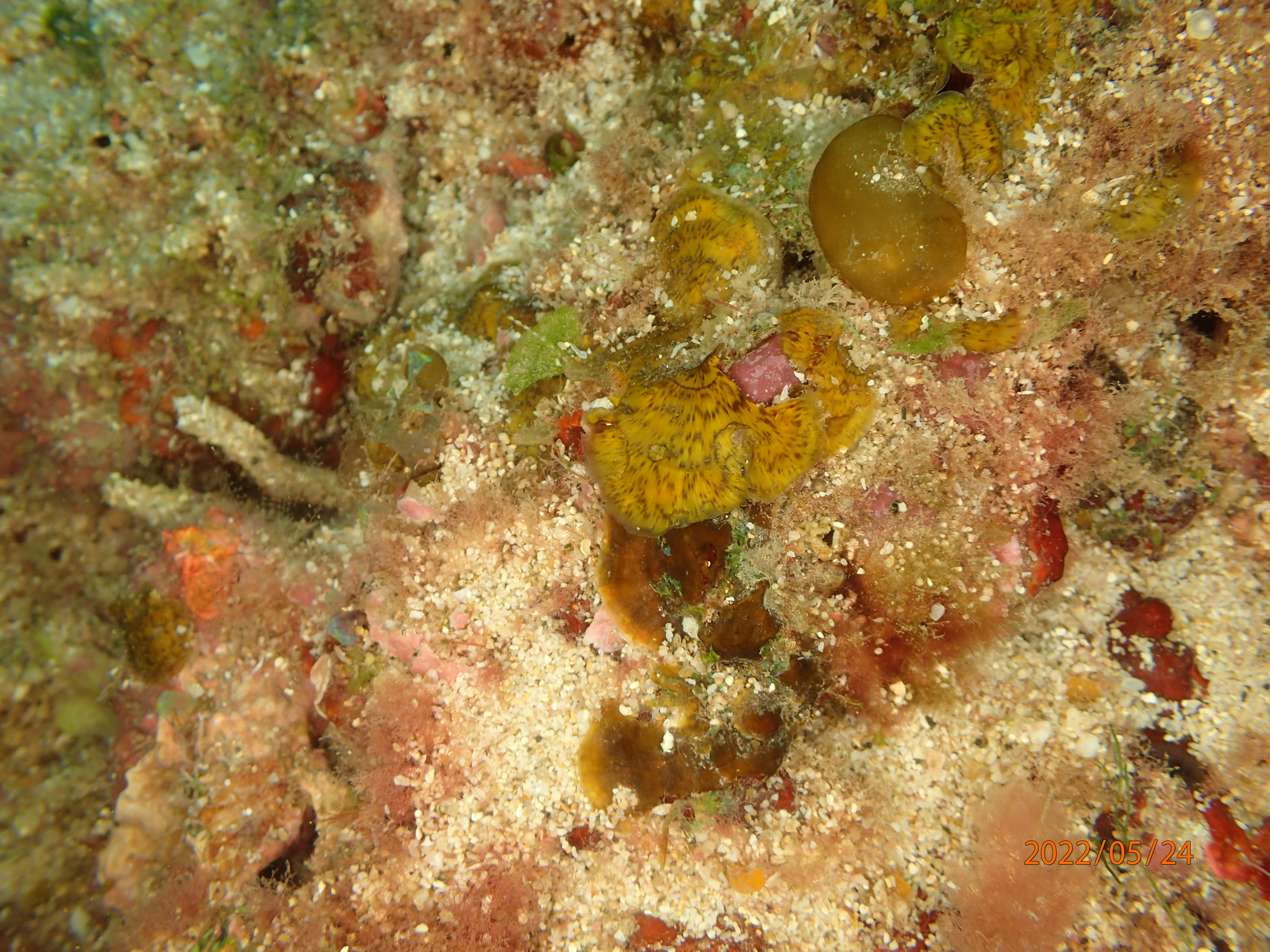
Lobophora sp. from Vietnam

Varying metabolomic concentration differs from Lobophora species when exposed to changing natural habitats and substrates. Fatty acids derivatives and polyolefins were identified as chemomarkers of these changing conditions. This indicates possible chemical plasticity of metabolites in the genus. Different Lobophora may composed varying natural products depending on bioregion.

== Economic importance/ natural products ==
Similar to other seaweeds, Genus Lobophora has a variety of natural products. There are: Minerals: cadmium (Cd), copper (Cu), mercury (Hg), iodine (I), nickel (Ni), lead (Pb), and zinc (Zn); Pigments: carotene, chlorophyll a, chlorophyll c, fucoxanthin; Polysaccharides/ simple sugars: alginic acid, laminarin; Sugar alcohol: mannitol.

In addition Lobophora may have contributions in medicinal application. Sulfated polysaccharides, fucans, from algae Lobophora variegata were shown to have anti-inflammatory activity in acute zymosan-induced arthritis in laboratory rats. It resulted in treatments by reducing cell infiltration in the synovial membrane with a decrease in TNF-α. It was also shown that heterofucans are strong antioxidants. Another is Lobophora has antiprotozoal activity against parasitic protozoans such as Giardia intestinalis, Entamoeba histolytica and Trichomonas vaginalis. Extract from L. variegata shows promising result in the treatments of protozoan infection. The chloroform fraction of the extract contained a major sulfoquinovosyl diacylglycerol (SQDG), identified as 1-O-palmitoyl-2-O-myristoyl-3-O-(6´´´-sulfo-a-D-quinovopyranosyl)-glycerol, together with small amounts of 1,2-di-O-palmitoyl-3-O-(6´´´-sulfo-a-D-quinovopyranosyl)-glycerol, and a new compound identified as 1-O-palmitoyl-2-O-oleoyl-3-O-(6´´´-sulfo-a-D-quinovopyranosyl)-glycerol were identified having strong antiprotozoal attributes.
