= Victor Félix Schiffner =

Austrian bryologist (1862–1944)

Victor Félix Schiffner (10 August 1862, Böhmisch-Leipa – 1 December 1944, Baden bei Wien) was an Austrian bryologist specializing in the study of hepatics.

== Biography ==
He studied natural sciences at the University of Prague, where he subsequently worked as a lecturer and as an assistant to Heinrich Moritz Willkomm at the botanical garden. In 1893-94 he was stationed in the Dutch East Indies, being based at the Buitenzorg herbarium on Java. In the meantime, he collected liverwort specimens on Java and Sumatra. In 1895 he returned to Prague, being appointed professor of botany at the university.

In 1901 he participated in a government sponsored mission to southern Brazil, where he collected bryophytes. After returning to Austria, he was appointed professor at the University of Vienna, where he remained until 1932 (year of retirement). During the latter part of his career, he focused his energies towards flora native to Europe. Between 1895 and 1943 Schiffner edited several exsiccatae and exsiccata-like series distributing a large number of specimens, among others the series Expositio plantarum in itinere suo indico annis 1893-1894 suscepto collectarum speciminibusque exsiccatis distributarum, adjectis descriptionibus novarum (abbrev. Iter Indicum 1893-1894) and between 1901 and 1943 the work Hepaticae Europaeae exsiccatae. His personal herbarium contained 50,000 hepatics and mosses, a collection that was acquired by Harvard University in 1931.

== Taxa ==
The following genera are named in his honor:

- Schiffneria, (author Franz Stephani, 1894), genus of liverworts,
- Schiffnerina, (author Otto Kuntze, 1903), former genus of liverworts,
- Schiffnerula (author Franz Xaver Rudolf von Höhnel, 1909), genus of fungi,
- Phaeoschiffnerula (author Theiss. 1914), former genus of fungi,
- Schiffneriolejeunea, (author Inez Clare Verdoorn, 1933), genus of liverworts,

== Published works ==
He was editor of the section on Hepaticae in Engler and Prantl's Die Natürlichen Pflanzenfamilien. The following are a few of his principal writings:

- Monographia Hellebororum, 1890.
- Conspectus hepaticarum archipelagi Indici, 1898.
- Die Hepaticae der Flora von Buitenzorg, 1900.
- Kritische Bemerkungen über die europäischen Lebermoose mit Bezug auf die Exemplare des Exsiccatenwerkes Hepaticae europeae exsiccatae, 1901.
- Hepaticae (Lebermoose), 1909.
- Bryophyta (Sphagnales - Bryales - Hepaticae), (with Carl Friedrich Warnstorf and Wilhelm Mönkemeyer), (1914) In: Adolf Pascher's "Süsswasser-flora. Deutschlands, Österreichs und der Schweiz".
- Studien über Algen des adriatischen Meeres, 1915 - Studies on algae of the Adriatic Sea.
