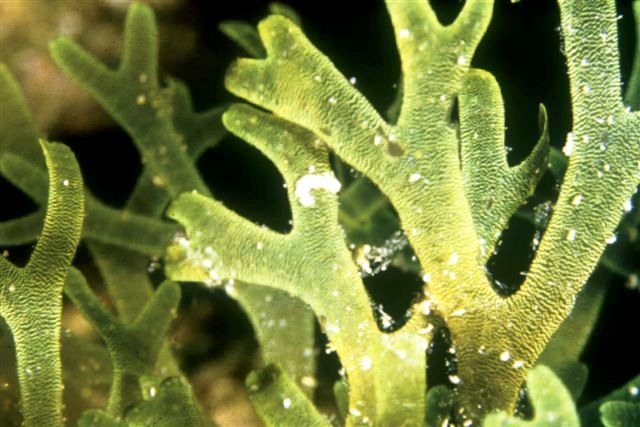
- Dictyota dichotoma at Capo Gallo, Palermo, Sicily

Scientific classification
- Domain: Eukaryota
- Clade: Diaphoretickes
- Clade: SAR
- Clade: Stramenopiles
- Phylum: Gyrista
- Subphylum: Ochrophytina
- Class: Phaeophyceae
- Order: Dictyotales
- Family: Dictyotaceae
- Genus: Dictyota
- Species: D. dichotoma

Binomial name
- Dictyota dichotoma (Desfontaines) J.V.Lamouroux

Synonyms
- List: Dichophyllium dichotomum (Hudson) Kützing, 1843; Dictyota acuta Kützing, 1845; Dictyota apiculata J.Agardh, 1894; Dictyota areolata Schousboe, 1892; Dictyota attenuata Kützing, 1859; Dictyota complanata Schousboe ex Bornet, 1892; Dictyota elongata Kützing, 1859; Dictyota latifolia Kützing, 1859; Dictyota rotundata J.V.Lamouroux, 1809; Dictyota setosa Duby, 1830; Dictyota volubilis Kützing, 1849; Fucus dichotomus (Hudson) Bertoloni, 1819; Fucus zosteroides J.V.Lamouroux, 1805; Haliseris dichotoma (Hudson) Sprengel, 1827; Neurocarpus annularis Schousboe, 1892; Neurocarpus areolatus Schousboe, 1892; Ulva dichotoma Hudson, 1762; Zonaria dichotoma (Hudson) C.Agardh, 1817; Zonaria rotundata (Lamouroux) C.Agardh, 1817

= Dictyota dichotoma =

Species of brown algae

Dictyota dichotoma is a species of Brown algae found in the temperate western and eastern Atlantic Ocean, the Mediterranean Sea, the Black Sea, the Red Sea and the western Indian Ocean.

== Description ==
The thallus of Dictyota dichotoma grows in tufts and is a yellowish-brown or greenish colour, with a faint bluish iridescence when underwater. It forms membranous, flattened, dichotomously-branching fronds up to 25 cm (10 in) long and 10 mm (0.4 in) wide. These have a reticulated (net-like) structure and no midrib. The tufts are semi-erect and have little or no stalk; they are anchored to the seabed by rhizoids, filamentous outgrowths that can absorb nutrients from their surroundings. The thallus branches are strap-like, the branches being equal in length and having rounded ends. Clusters of spores develop in round or oval sori under the surface of the thallus, finally bursting through.

== Distribution and habitat ==
Dictyota dichotoma has a wide range, being found in the western Atlantic Ocean and the eastern Atlantic Ocean from Scandinavia southwards to Mauritania, the Mediterranean Sea, the Black Sea, the Red Sea and the Indian Ocean. It grows on rock substrates in well-lit areas with little water movement, and sometimes on the fronds or holdfasts of other seaweeds. It is usually found at depths down to about 30 m (100 ft), but can exceptionally occur down to 80 m (260 ft).

== Biology ==
Dictyota dichotoma is dioecious, reproduction taking place in the spring and summer. The sporophytes and the gametophytes are similar in morphology, and the reproductive organs appear on the thallus as small, dark-coloured spots. Gamete release is linked to the phases of the moon. This alga is an annual, the thalli are abundant in summer but degenerate by the end of the year.

As a brown alga, Dictyota dichotoma contains chlorophyll and other pigments for photosynthesis. Research has shown that it contains many secondary metabolites, with at least seventeen diterpenes having been isolated from extracts of the thallus. Also present were a range of other chemical compounds including alkaloids, steroids, tannins, flavonoids, phenols, coumarins, quinones and glycosides. Saponins were not present. A methanolic extract was found to have antifungal activities against Candida albicans.
