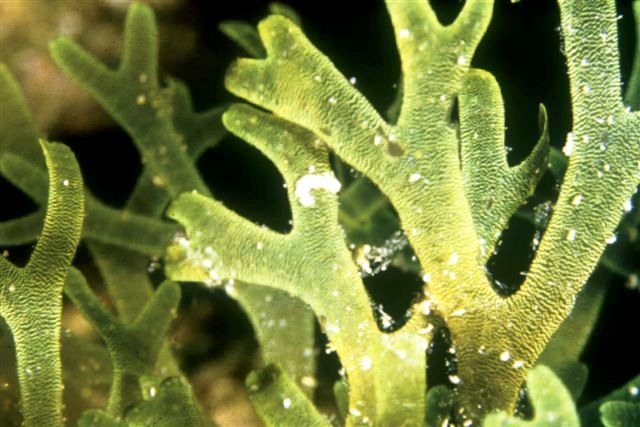
- Dictyota dichotoma

Scientific classification
- Domain: Eukaryota
- Clade: Sar
- Clade: Stramenopiles
- Division: Ochrophyta
- Class: Phaeophyceae
- Order: Dictyotales; Bory de Saint-Vincent, 1828
- Family: Dictyotaceae; Lamouroux ex Dumortier, 1822

Genera
- 21 genera

Synonyms
- Scoresbyellaceae Womersley, 1987

= Dictyotaceae =

Family of brown algae

Dictyotaceae is large family of brown algae (class Phaeophyceae). It is the only family in the monotypic order Dictyotales (from Greek diktyotos 'netlike'). Members of this family generally prefer warmer waters than other brown algae and are prevalent in tropical and subtropical waters thanks to their many chemical defenses to ward off grazers. They display an isomorphic haplodiploid life cycle and are characterized by vegetative growth through a single apical cell. One genus in this family, Padina, is the only calcareous member of the brown algae. Lobophora variegata (= Pocockiella varieagata) often presents a beautiful blue iridescence due to microscopic bacteria which live on the surface of the blades. A number of genera are known as forkweed (e.g. Dictyota, Glosophora, Dilophus, Dictyopteris, Pachydictyon and Lobospira.

== Biology ==
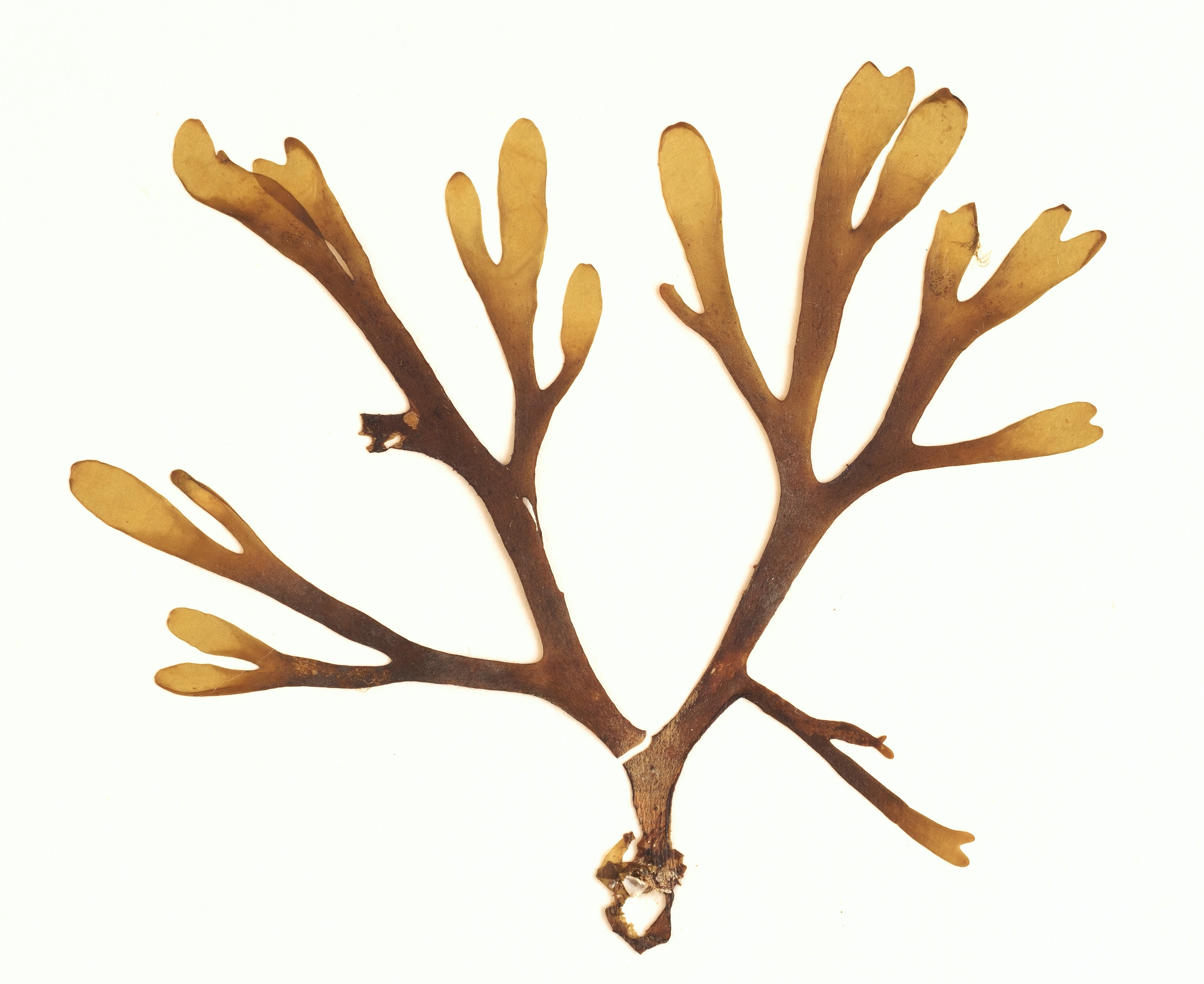
Dictyota dichotoma, Galicia, Spain

Dictyotales are an order of brown algae (Phaeophyceae), a lineage of multicellular photosynthetic protists composed by a thallus that has a certain level of tissue differentiation. The reference organism of Dictyotales used to study their general characteristics is Dictyota dichotoma.

=== Vegetative growth ===
Dictyotales are composed of flattened, parenchymatous thalli. They display apical growth: a single apical cell forms the flattened thallus, the vegetative part of the organism, through mitosis. The mature thallus is composed of three layers: one middle layer of large cells lacking chloroplasts, surrounded by two layers of small cells packed densely with chloroplasts lacking pyrenoids. Some taxa exhibit blue-green iridescence when submerged. Some species of Dictyopteris and Spatoglossum have cellular vacuoles with very low pH (between 0.5 and 0.9).

=== Life cycle and reproduction ===
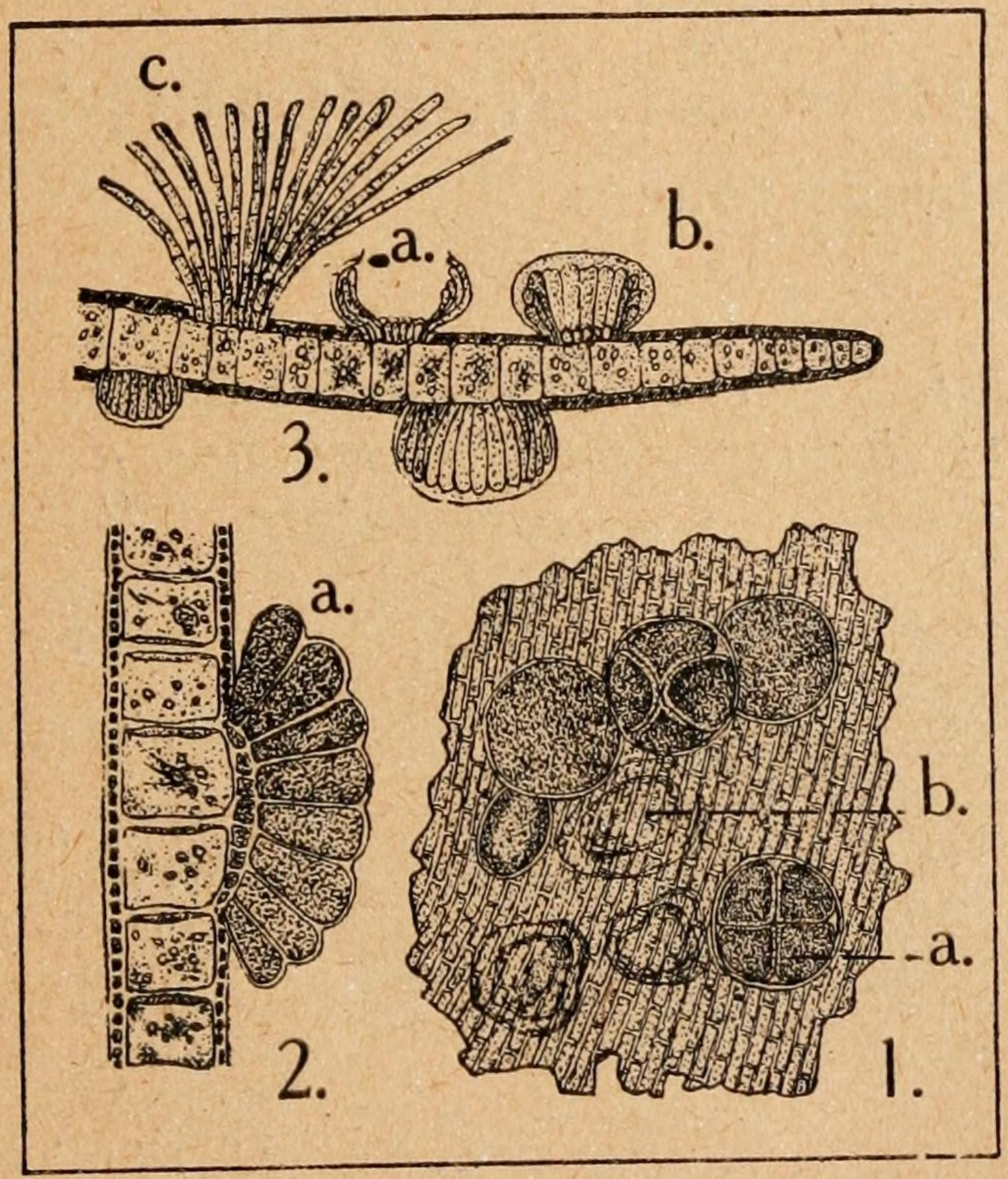
Dictyota dichotoma thallus. 1) Tetrasporangia seen from above. 2) Cross-section of oogonia. 3) Cross-section of antheridia.

Dictyotales displays, like other brown algae, an isomorphic alternation of two generations: the gametophytes (the haploid generation), which generate gametes through mitosis; and the sporophytes (the diploid generation), which generate spores through meiosis, both of them similar in shape and structure. The gametophytes form sex organs (female oogonia and male antheridia) in sori. Both sex organs develop from surface cells. The reproduction is oogamous, with a small and mobile male gamete (sperm cell) and a big immobile female gamete (egg cell).

- The female sori, deep-brown in color, usually have 25–50 oogonia, with sterile oogonia localized at the margin. To develop an oogonium, a surface cell divides into a stalk cell and the oogonium proper. Each oogonium produces one egg cell that is released through a gelatinized apex in its wall.
- The male sori, resembling white glistening spots, are surrounded by elongated sterile cells regarded as undeveloped antheridia. They can be recognized early in their development due to the disintegration of chloroplasts in their cells. To develop an antheridium, the surface cells enlarge and divide horizontally into a stalk cell and a primary spermatogenous cell, which in turn divides vertically and horizontally into 650–1500 compartments or locules, each producing one sperm cell. Each sperm cell is pear-shaped, with an anterior eyespot and only one flagellum inserted laterally, although two basal bodies are present, indicating an origin from a biflagellate ancestor. They are released from the antheridium through dissolution of the walls.

The egg cell secretes a pheromone, dictyotene, to attract the sperm cell. After the fertilization between the two gametes, the resulting diploid zygote grows into the sporophyte generation. On their surface, modified sporangia typically produce through meiosis four haploid non-flagellated aplanospores, but a few genera produce eight spores per sporangium (Lobophora, Zonaria) or flagellated spores (Exallosorus), two features considered primitive. The spores, while naked are released through the gelatinized apex of the sporangium. Soon after, they grow a cellulose wall and grow into gametophytes.

== Ecology ==
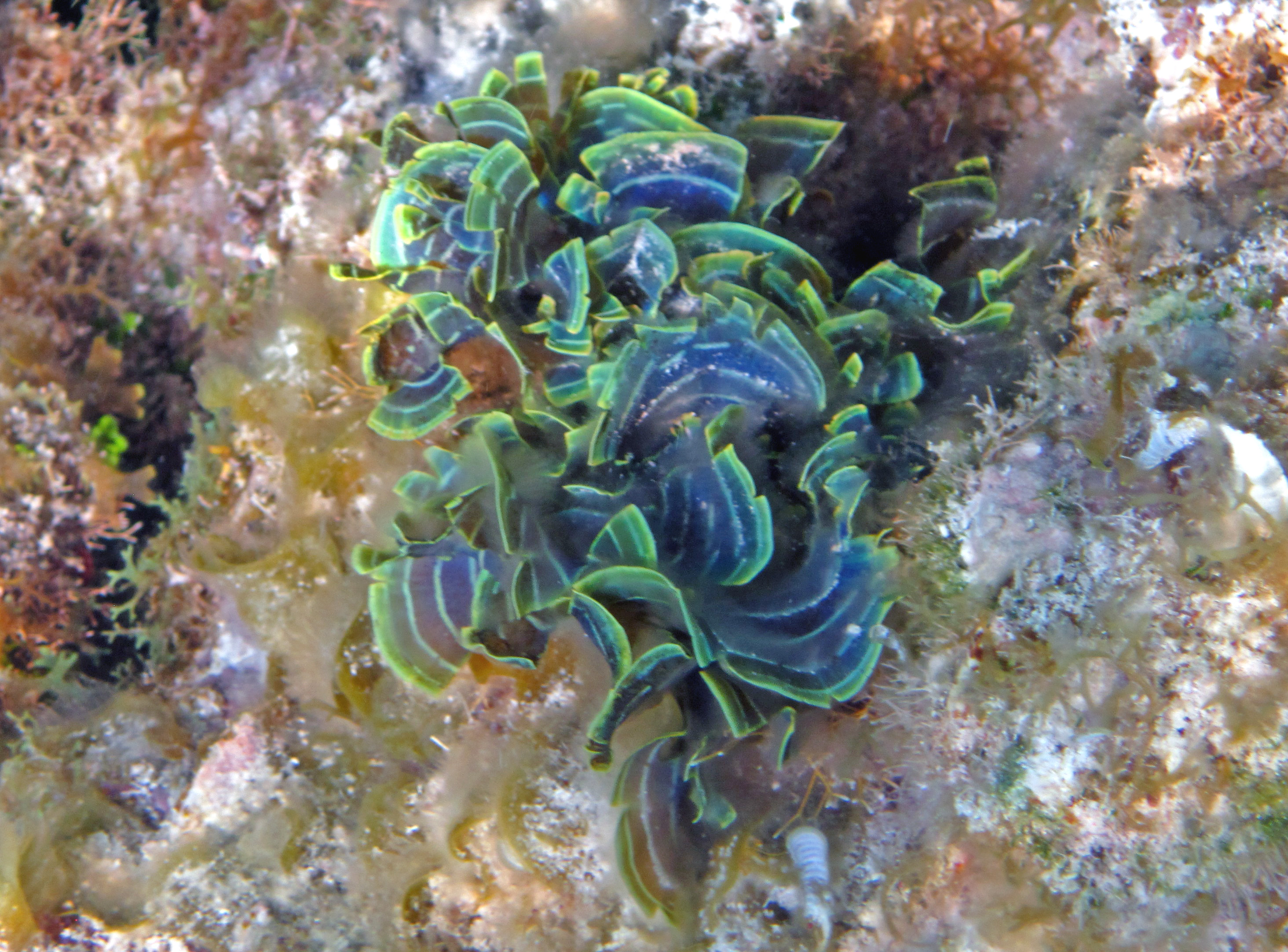
Padina boergesenii (leafy rolled-blade algae), San Salvador Island, Bahamas

Dictyotales are most diverse in tropical and subtropical waters, but extend into temperate regions. They are one of the few brown algal orders whose species can form a conspicuous, even dominant component of tropical and temperate marine floras. Their ecological success is often linked to their ability to deter grazers in habitats subject to strong grazing pressure, making them an important competitor of corals and other sessile benthic life in many coastal ecosystems. Some species, in particular within the genus Dictyota, produce terpenoids (such as pachydictyol) that inhibit grazing by herbivorous amphipods, sea urchins and fish. The species Lobophora variegata produces a cyclic lactone, lobophorolide, that in low concentrations is an active compound against pathogenic and saprophytic marine fungi.

Dictyota dominates 70% of the benthos biomass in the Florida Keys reef tract. The successful spread of this alga is due in part to its ability to asexually reproduce from fragments created by "biotic and abiotic disturbances".

Dictyotales contains the only calcareous genus of brown algae, Padina. Its margins contain a layer of apical cells with hairs that create a microenvironment where aragonite nucleation occurs, if isolated from the water flow.

== Classification ==
The order Dictyotales contains only one family, Dictyotaceae, described by French biologist Jean Vincent Félix Lamouroux, and later validly published by Belgian botanist Barthélemy Charles Joseph Dumortier in 1822. Originally, this order also included two provisional families, each with one genus: Scoresbyellaceae, described by Australian phycologist Hugh Bryan Spencer Womersley in 1987, and Dictyotopsidaceae, described by phycologist Bruce M. Allender in 1980. Posterior phylogenetic analyses showed that both families branch within Dictyotaceae, thus they were synonymized.

The latest revision of brown algae, published in 2014, recognizes 19 genera within Dictyotales, as well as 7 genera that have been synonymized with the accepted genera.

- Canistrocarpus De Paula & De Clerck in De Clerck et al., 2006
- Chlanidophora J. Agardh, 1894
- Dictyopteris J.V. Lamouroux, 1809 nom. cons.
- Dictyota J.V. Lamouroux, 1809 nom. cons.
  = Dilophus J. Agardh, 1882
  = Glossophora J. Agardh, 1882
  = Glossophorella Nizamuddin & Campbell, 1995
  = Pachydictyon J. Agardh, 1894
- Dictyotopsis Troll, 1931
- Distromium Levring, 1940
- Exallosorus J.A. Phillips, 1997
- Herringtonia Kraft, 2009
- Homoeostrichus J. Agardh, 1894
- Lobophora J. Agardh, 1894
  = Pocockiella Papenfuss, 1943
- Lobospira Areschoug, 1854
- Newhousia Kraft, G.W. Saunders, Abbott & Haroun, 2004
- Padina Adanson, 1763
  = Dictyerpa Collins & Harvey in Collins, 1901
  = Vaughaniella Børgesen, 1950
- Padinopsis Ercegovic, 1955
- Rugulopteryx De Paula & De Clerck in De Clerck et al., 2006
- Scoresbyella Womersley, 1987
- Spatoglossum Kützing, 1843
- Stoechospermum Kützing, 1843
- Stypopodium Kützing, 1843
- Taonia J. Agardh, 1848
- Zonaria C. Agardh, 1817
