= Marine fungi =

Species of fungi that live in marine or estuarine environments

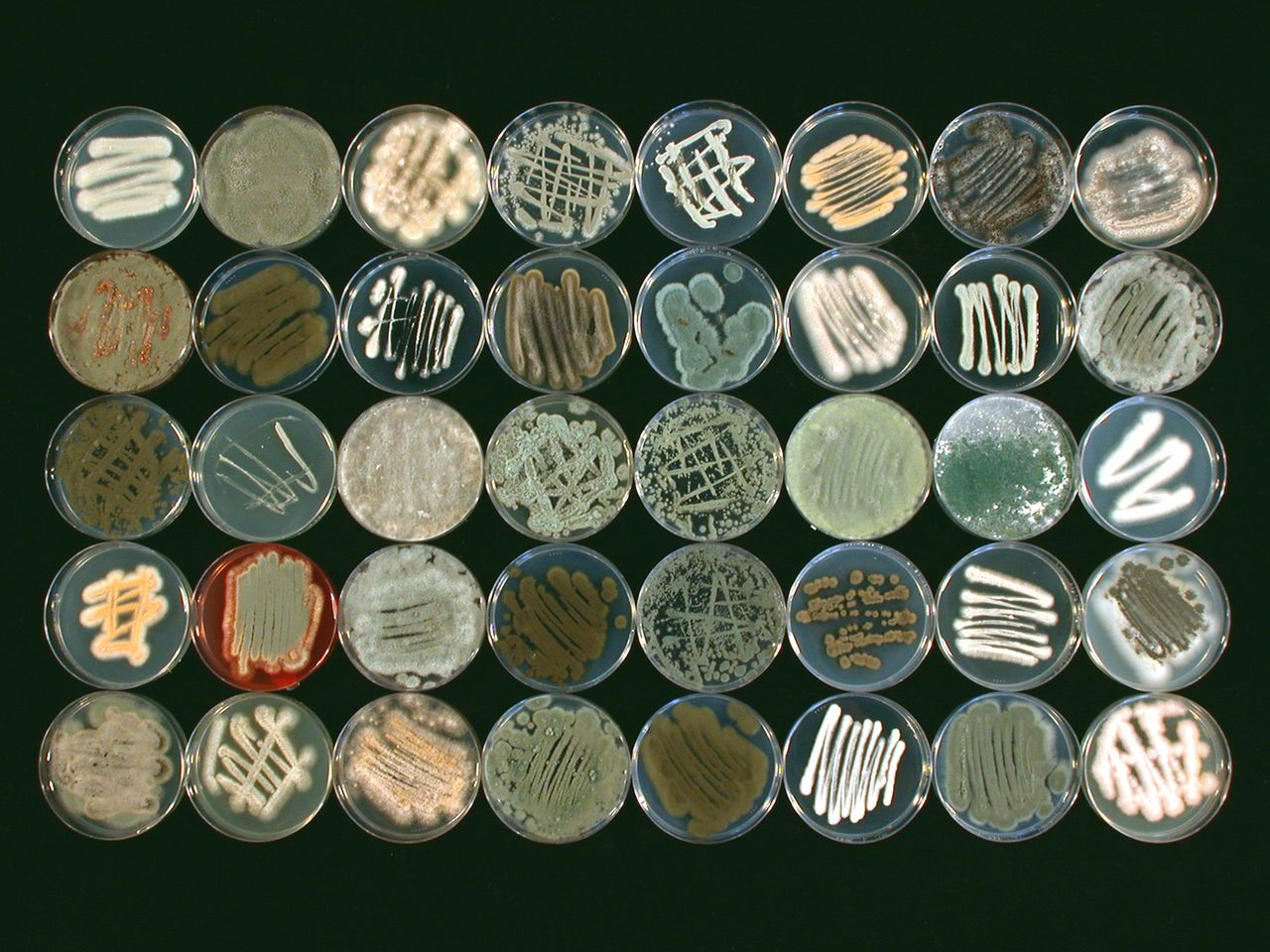
Morphological diversity of fungi collected from a marine sponge species, Ircinia variabilis

Marine fungi are species of fungi that live in marine or estuarine environments. They are not a taxonomic group, but share a common habitat. Obligate marine fungi grow exclusively in the marine habitat while wholly or sporadically submerged in sea water. Facultative marine fungi normally occupy terrestrial or freshwater habitats, but are capable of living or even sporulating in a marine habitat.

Marine fungi account for about 5% of the total ocean biomass. About 2,149 species of marine fungi have been described, within eleven phyla and 856 genera, although only about 64 species have been fully genetically sequenced. Many species of marine fungi are known only from spores and it is likely a large number of species have yet to be discovered. It has been estimated that less than 1% of all marine fungal species have been described, due to difficulty in targeting marine fungal DNA and difficulties that arise in attempting to grow cultures of marine fungi. It is impracticable to culture many of these fungi, but their nature can be investigated by examining seawater samples and undertaking rDNA analysis of the fungal material found.

Different marine habitats support very different fungal communities. Fungi can be found in niches ranging from ocean depths and coastal waters to mangrove swamps and estuaries with low salinity levels. Marine fungi can be saprobic or parasitic on animals, saprobic or parasitic on algae, saprobic on plants, or saprobic on dead wood.

There has been some debate as to what exactly a marine fungus should be defined as. A definition used previously was "individuals with a long-term presence and metabolic activities in a marine habitat." A more commonly used definition now is from Ka-Lai et al. 2016: "any fungus that is recovered repeatedly from marine habitats because: 1) it is able to grow and/or sporulate (on substrata) in marine environments; 2) it forms symbiotic relationships with other marine organisms; or 3) it is shown to adapt and evolve at the genetic level or be metabolically active in marine environments."

== Overview ==
Terrestrial fungi play critical roles in nutrient cycling and food webs and can shape macroorganism communities as parasites and mutualists. Although estimates for the number of fungal species on the planet range from 2.2 to 3.8 million species, likely fewer than 10% of fungi have been identified so far, being around 150,000. To date, a relatively small percentage of described species are associated with marine environments, with ~2,200 species retrieved exclusively from the marine environment. Nevertheless, fungi have been found in nearly every marine habitat explored, from the surface of the ocean to kilometers deep in ocean sediments. Fungi are hypothesized to contribute to phytoplankton population cycles and the biological carbon pump and are active in the chemistry of marine sediments. Many fungi have been identified as commensals or pathogens of marine animals, like corals, sponges, and other marine organisms like plants, and algae. Despite their varied roles, remarkably little is known about the diversity of this major branch of eukaryotic life in marine ecosystems or their ecological functions.

Fungi represent a large and diverse group of microorganisms in microbiological communities in the marine environment and have an important role in nutrient cycling. They are divided into two major groups; obligate marine fungi and facultative marine fungi. Obligate marine fungi are adapted to reproduce in the aquatic environment, while facultative marine fungi can grow in aquatic as well as terrestrial environments. Marine fungi are called marine-derived fungi when their facultative or obligate state is not certain.

Marine fungal species occur as saprobes, parasites, or symbionts and colonize a wide range of substrates, such as sponges, corals, mangroves, seagrasses and algae. Factors that influence whether or not marine fungi are present in any particular location include the water temperature, its salinity, the water movement, the presence of suitable substrates for colonization, the presence of propagules in the water, interspecific competition, pollution and the oxygen content of the water. Some marine fungi which have ventured into the sea from terrestrial habitats include species that burrow into sand grains, living in the pores. Others live inside stony corals, and may become pathogenic if the coral is stressed by rising sea temperatures.

In 2011 the phylogeny of marine fungi was elucidated by analysis of their small subunit ribosomal DNA sequences. Thirty six new marine lineages were found, the majority of which were chytrids but also some filamentous and multicellular fungi. The majority of the species found were ascomycetous and basidiomycetous yeasts. The secondary metabolites produced by marine fungi have high potential for use in biotechnological, medical and industrial applications.

The ocean constitutes about 99% of the volume in the biosphere. Oceanic microbes comprise 70%–90% of the biomass of marine biota and are the main drivers of marine biogeochemical cycles. They are responsible for determining the amount of carbon fixed during photosynthesis, the subsequent release of carbon back to CO_{2} through respiration, and ultimately the sequestration of carbon in the deep ocean over millennial scales. Present estimates of marine microbial biomass primarily rely on bacteria, archaea, and protists. Pelagic (planktonic) fungal biomass has been less studied and only superficially characterized, despite their recently documented ubiquitous presence and active participation in the marine carbon and nitrogen cycles.

As of 2025, only a few studies are available on pelagic fungal biomass, restricted to distinct coastal areas, and an accurate representation of the vast open-ocean environment is still lacking. These studies are based on different methods, each with their own limitations hampering robust intercomparison of results. Among the biomass of organisms/groups estimated in the ocean, fungi accounted for the highest uncertainty, ranging more than two orders of magnitude, indicating the need for a direct estimate of fungal biomass in the ocean. There is need for large-scale sampling across biogeographical provinces in the open ocean to ensure precise quantification of pelagic fungi in the microbial biomass.

== Evolution ==
In contrast to plants and animals, the early fossil record of the fungi is meager. Since fungi do not biomineralise, they do not readily enter the fossil record. Fungal fossils are difficult to distinguish from those of other microbes, and are most easily identified when they resemble extant fungi.

The earliest fossils possessing features typical of fungi date to the Paleoproterozoic era, some 2,400 million years ago (Ma). These multicellular benthic organisms had filamentous structures capable of anastomosis, in which hyphal branches recombine. Other recent studies (2009) estimate the arrival of fungal organisms at about 760–1060 Ma on the basis of comparisons of the rate of evolution in closely related groups.

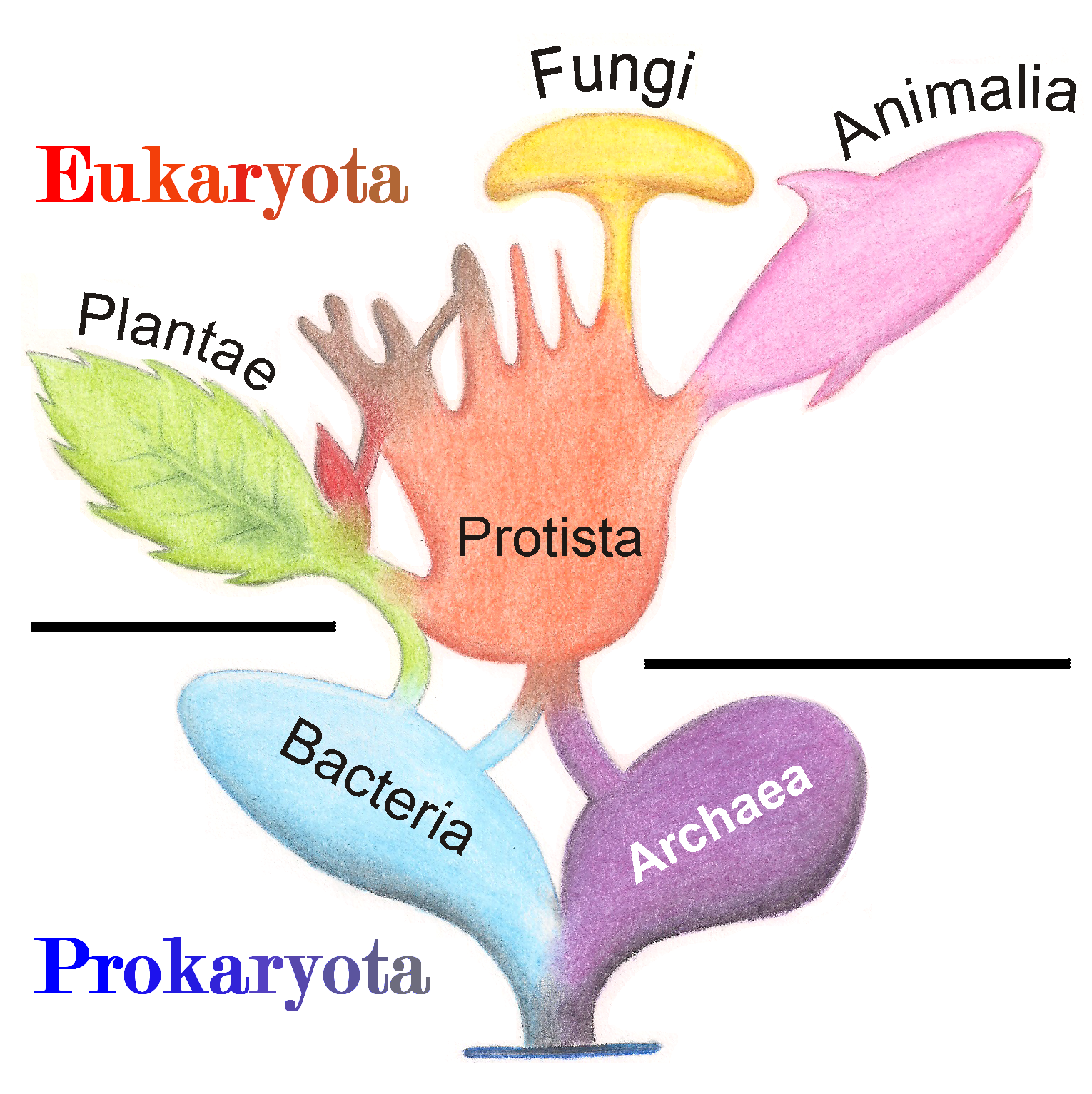
Phylogenetic and symbiogenetic tree of living organisms, showing a view of the origins of eukaryotes and prokaryotes

For much of the Paleozoic Era (542–251 Ma), the fungi appear to have been aquatic and consisted of organisms similar to the extant Chytrids in having flagellum-bearing spores. Phylogenetic analyses suggest that the flagellum was lost early in the evolutionary history of the fungi, and consequently, the majority of fungal species lack a flagellum. Evidence from DNA analysis suggests that all fungi are descended from one common ancestor, at least 600 million years ago. It is probable that these earliest fungi lived in water, and had flagella. Fungi moved to land at about the same time as plants, about 460 million years ago, at least. Although fungi are opisthokonts—a grouping of evolutionarily related organisms broadly characterized by a single posterior flagellum—all phyla except for the chytrids have lost their posterior flagella.

The evolutionary adaptation from an aquatic to a terrestrial lifestyle necessitated a diversification of ecological strategies for obtaining nutrients, including parasitism, saprobism, and the development of mutualistic relationships such as mycorrhiza and lichenization. Recent (2009) studies suggest that the ancestral ecological state of the Ascomycota was saprobism, and that independent lichenization events have occurred multiple times.

The growth of fungi as hyphae on or in solid substrates or as single cells in aquatic environments is adapted for the efficient extraction of nutrients, because these growth forms have high surface area to volume ratios. Hyphae are specifically adapted for growth on solid surfaces, and to invade substrates and tissues. They can exert large penetrative mechanical forces; for example, many plant pathogens, including Magnaporthe grisea, form a structure called an appressorium that evolved to puncture plant tissues. The pressure generated by the appressorium, directed against the plant epidermis, can exceed 8 megapascals (1,200 psi). The filamentous fungus Paecilomyces lilacinus uses a similar structure to penetrate the eggs of nematodes.

Fungi were considered to be part of the plant kingdom until the mid-20th century. By the middle of the 20th century, fungi were considered a distinct kingdom, and the newly recognized kingdom Fungi becoming the third major kingdom of multicellular eukaryotes with kingdom Plantae and kingdom Animalia, the distinguishing feature between these kingdoms being the way they obtain nutrition.

== Planktonic marine fungi ==
Marine plankton are organisms that drift in the ocean but are unable to actively propel themselves against currents. Planktonic marine fungi are found drifting in the marine water column in the form of spores, yeasts, mycelia, sporangia or other fungal propagules, in suspension or attached to particles, substrates or planktonic hosts.

=== Food webs and the mycoloop ===
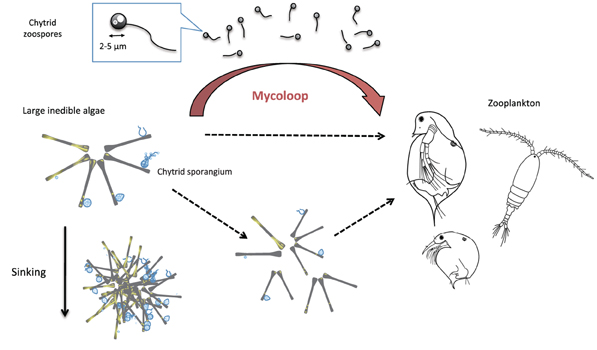
Diagram of a mycoloop (fungus loop) Parasitic chytrids can transfer material from large inedible phytoplankton to zooplankton. Chytrids zoospores are excellent food for zooplankton in terms of size (2–5 μm in diameter), shape, nutritional quality (rich in polyunsaturated fatty acids and cholesterols). Large colonies of host phytoplankton may also be fragmented by chytrid infections and become edible to zooplankton.

The mycoloop is a trophic pathway in aquatic food webs where parasitic fungi, particularly chytrids, facilitate the transfer of nutrients and energy from large, inedible phytoplankton (algae) to zooplankton. This process enhances nutrient cycling and supports higher trophic levels in aquatic ecosystems.

Chytrids infect large, inedible phytoplankton, such as diatoms or cyanobacteria, and produce zoospores (free-living, motile spores, 2–5 μm in diameter). These zoospores are rich in nutrients like polyunsaturated fatty acids (PUFAs) and cholesterol, making them an excellent food source for zooplankton, such as Daphnia and rotifers. By consuming the zoospores or fragmented phytoplankton, zooplankton gain access to nutrients that would otherwise be unavailable from inedible phytoplankton, creating the trophic link called the mycoloop. In this manner, the mycoloop channels carbon, phosphorus, and other nutrients from phytoplankton to zooplankton, bypassing the limitations of inedible phytoplankton.

The mycoloop can influence phytoplankton blooms by reducing host populations (via parasitism) and supporting zooplankton growth, potentially stabilizing aquatic food webs. It can also influence the carbon cycle by altering carbon fluxes, reducing the sinking of large phytoplankton and redirecting carbon to higher trophic levels.

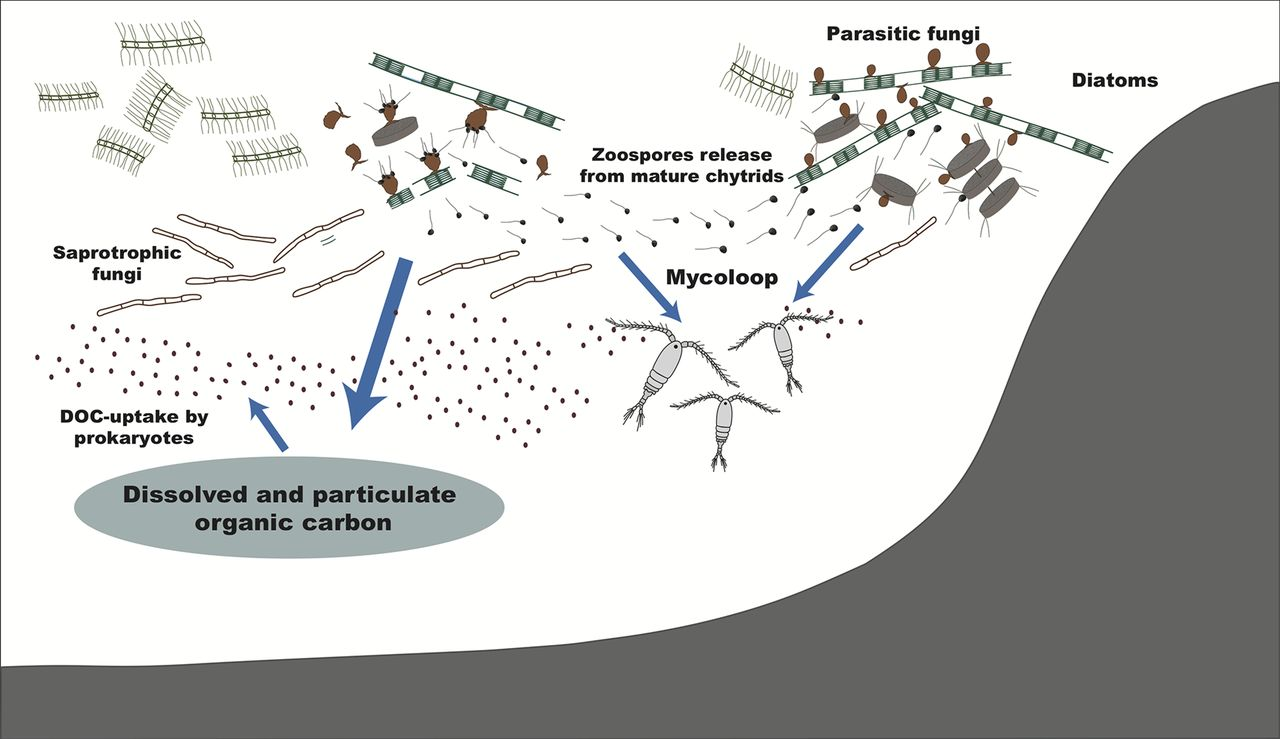
Roles of fungi in the marine carbon cycle Roles of fungi in the marine carbon cycle by processing phytoplankton-derived organic matter. Parasitic fungi, as well as saprotrophic fungi, directly assimilate phytoplankton organic carbon. By releasing zoospores, the fungi bridge the trophic linkage to zooplankton, known as the mycoloop. By modifying the particulate and dissolved organic carbon, they can affect bacteria and the microbial loop. These processes may modify marine snow chemical composition and the subsequent functioning of the biological carbon pump.

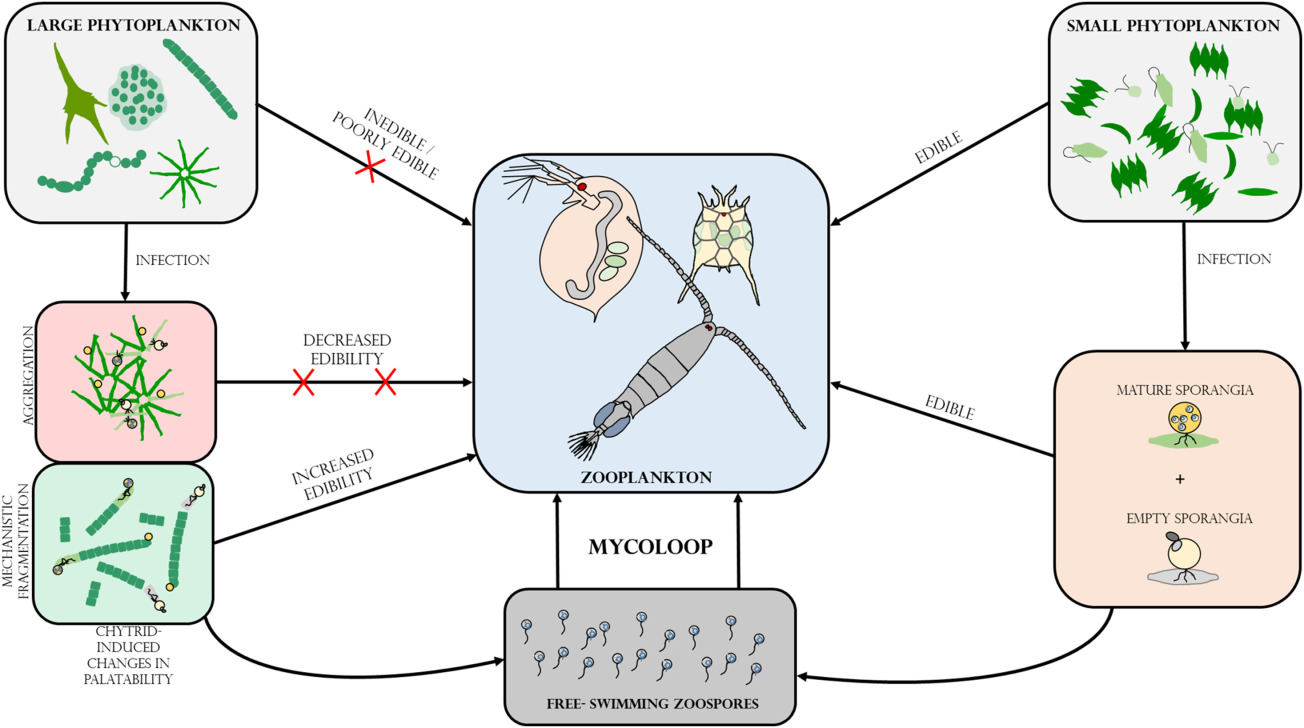
Mycoloop links between phytoplankton and zooplankton Chytrid‐mediated trophic links between phytoplankton and zooplankton (mycoloop). While small phytoplankton species can be grazed upon by zooplankton, large phytoplankton species constitute poorly edible or even inedible prey. Chytrid infections on large phytoplankton can induce changes in palatability, as a result of host aggregation (reduced edibility) or mechanistic fragmentation of cells or filaments (increased palatability). First, chytrid parasites extract and repack nutrients and energy from their hosts in form of readily edible zoospores. Second, infected and fragmented hosts including attached sporangia can also be ingested by grazers (i.e. concomitant predation).

=== Algae and phytoplankton ===
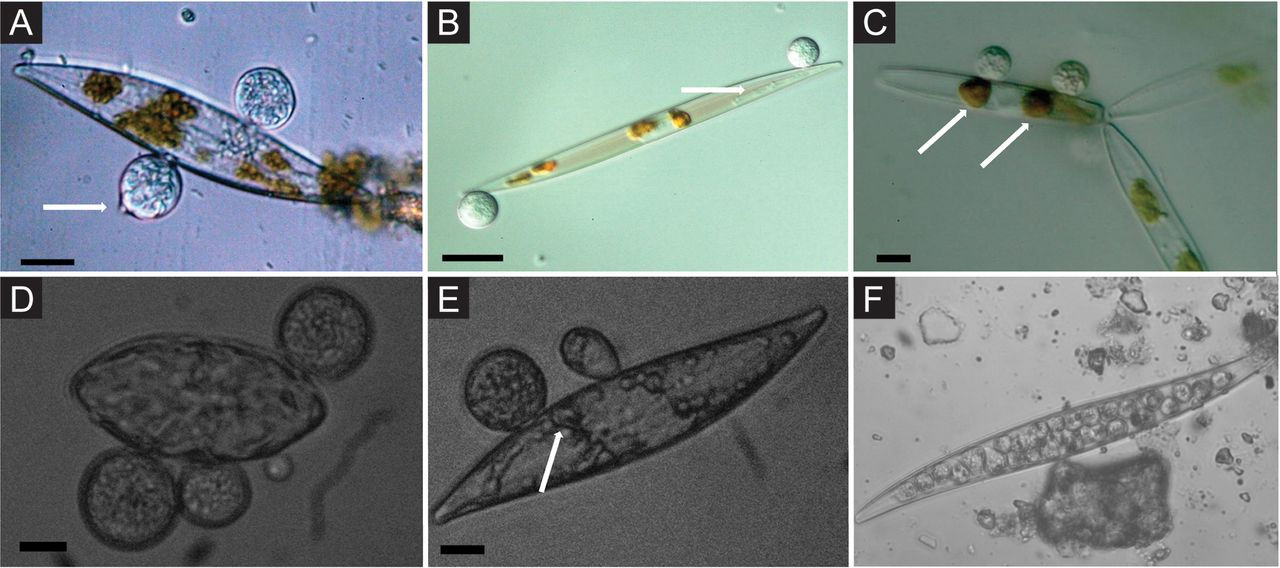
Chytrid parasites of marine diatoms. (A) Chytrid sporangia on Pleurosigma sp. The white arrow indicates the operculate discharge pore. (B) Rhizoids (white arrow) extending into diatom host. (C) Chlorophyll aggregates localized to infection sites (white arrows). (D and E) Single hosts bearing multiple zoosporangia at different stages of development. The white arrow in panel E highlights branching rhizoids. (F) Endobiotic chytrid-like sporangia within diatom frustule. Bars = 10 μm.

Marine fungi associated with algae are largely unexplored, despite their ecological role and potential industrial applications. For example, it has been shown that fungi associated with algae produce many bioactive secondary metabolites. Algae derived fungi can be associated with a variety of algae, including brown (e.g., Agarum clathratum, Fucus sp., Laminaria sp., Sargassum sp.), green (e.g., Ulva sp., Enteromorpha sp., Flabellia sp.), or red (e.g. Chondrus sp., Dilsea sp., Ceramium sp.) algae.

Almost one-third of all known marine fungal species are associated with algae. The most commonly described fungi associated with algae belong to the Ascomycota and are represented by a wide diversity of genera such as Acremonium, Alternaria, Aspergillus, Cladosporium, Phoma, Penicillium, Trichoderma, Emericellopsis, Retrosium, Spathulospora, Pontogenia and Sigmoidea.

Rhyzophydium littoreum is a marine chytrid, a primitive fungus that infects green algae in estuaries. It obtains nutrients from the host alga and produces swimming zoospores that must survive in open water, a low nutrient environment, until a new host is encountered. Another fungus, Ascochyta salicorniae, found growing on seaweed is being investigated for its action against malaria, a mosquito-borne infectious disease of humans and other animals.

=== Other roles ===
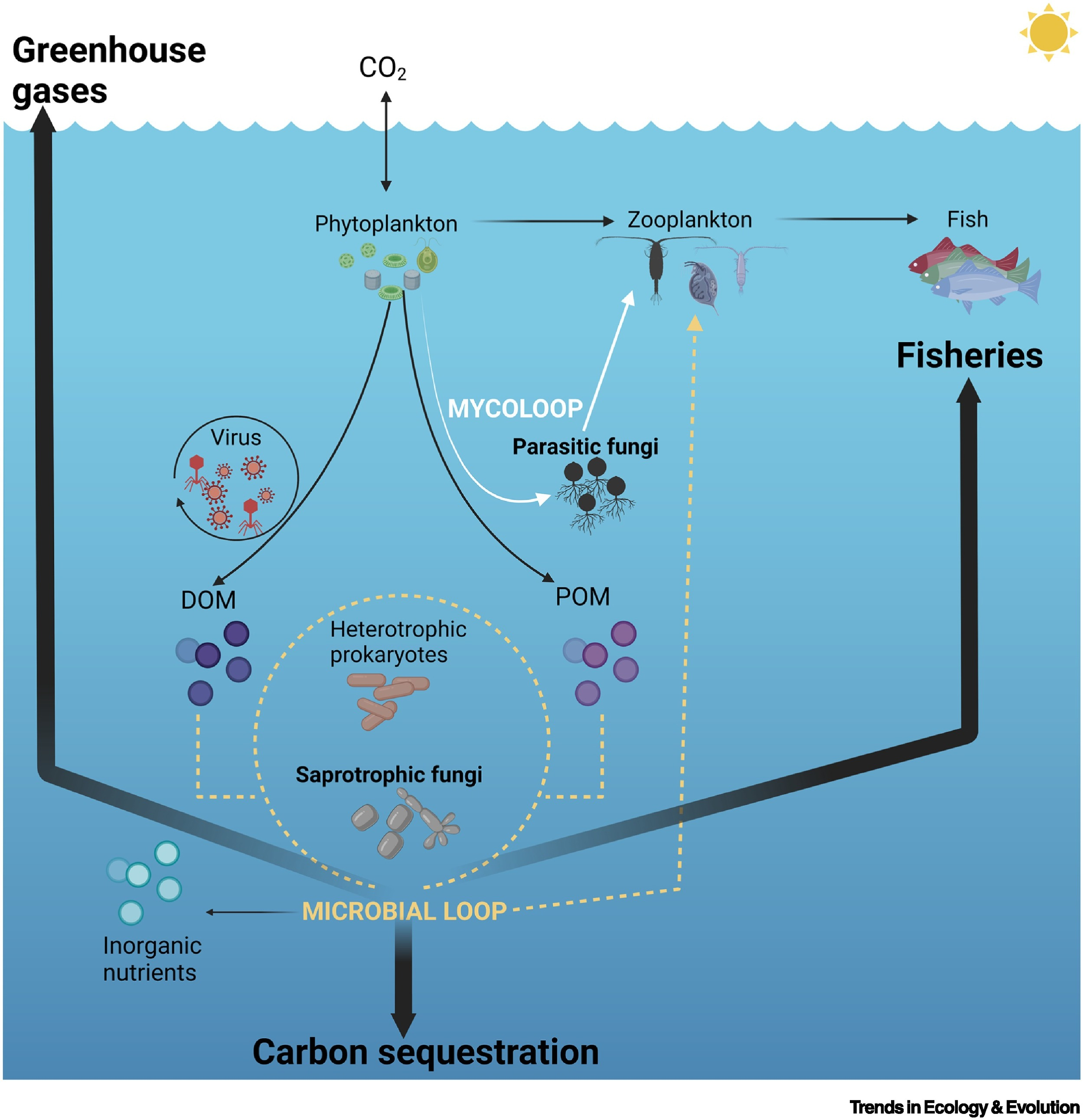
Role of fungi in ocean carbon sequestration This representation includes the traditionally neglected pelagic fungi, both parasitic and saprotrophic, highlighting the central role played by them, parasitic fungi in the mycoloop, and saprotrophic fungi as active contributors to the microbial loop. As depicted by this diagram, the activity of heterotrophic microbes, including pelagic fungi, has far-reaching global implications for fisheries (i.e., the amount of carbon that will ultimately flow to higher trophic levels) and climate change (i.e., the amount of carbon that will be sequestered in the ocean or respired back to CO_{2} and the release of other greenhouse gases; e.g., N_{2}O).

Apart from serving as a food source for zooplankton and other microorganisms in the microbial loop, marine planktonic fungi (and ocean pelagic fungi) play other, often understudied, roles in marine ecosystems, contributing to:

- Nutrient cycling: They decompose organic matter, breaking down complex compounds like lignin and cellulose, recycling nutrients such as carbon and nitrogen back into the ecosystem for use by other organisms.
- Carbon sequestration: By degrading organic material, pelagic fungi influence the marine carbon cycle, potentially aiding in carbon storage through the formation of recalcitrant compounds that sink to the ocean floor.
- Symbiotic and pathogenic interactions: Some fungi form symbiotic relationships with phytoplankton or other marine organisms, while others act as pathogens, influencing population dynamics of algae, zooplankton, or fish.
- Biogeochemical processes: Fungi contribute to processes like nitrogen fixation and the sulfur cycle, impacting the availability of essential elements in the pelagic zone.

In the marine environment, fungi have been detected in every explored habitat, from surface to deeper waters, from the coast to the open ocean, and from beaches to deep sediments. However, compared to their terrestrial counterparts, planktonic marine fungi, belonging to the mycoplankton, have been much less studied in terms of occurrence, biodiversity, dynamics, and contribution to ecosystem processes. Like terrestrial species, marine fungi are thought to contribute to organic matter degradation processes and nutrient cycling by acting as saprotrophic (i.e., decomposers) or parasitic organisms at different trophic levels. (For example, fungal zoospores efficiently transfer organic matter from large, otherwise inedible, phytoplankton cells to zooplankton, in the process termed mycoloop.) While mycoplankton are thought to have significant impacts on ecosystems, these organisms remain poorly understood.

As of 2025, metagenomic analysis shows the widespread presence of pelagic fungi in the global ocean, yet their quantitative contribution to carbon stocks remains elusive, hindering their incorporation into biogeochemical models.

== Marine plants ==
=== Mangroves ===
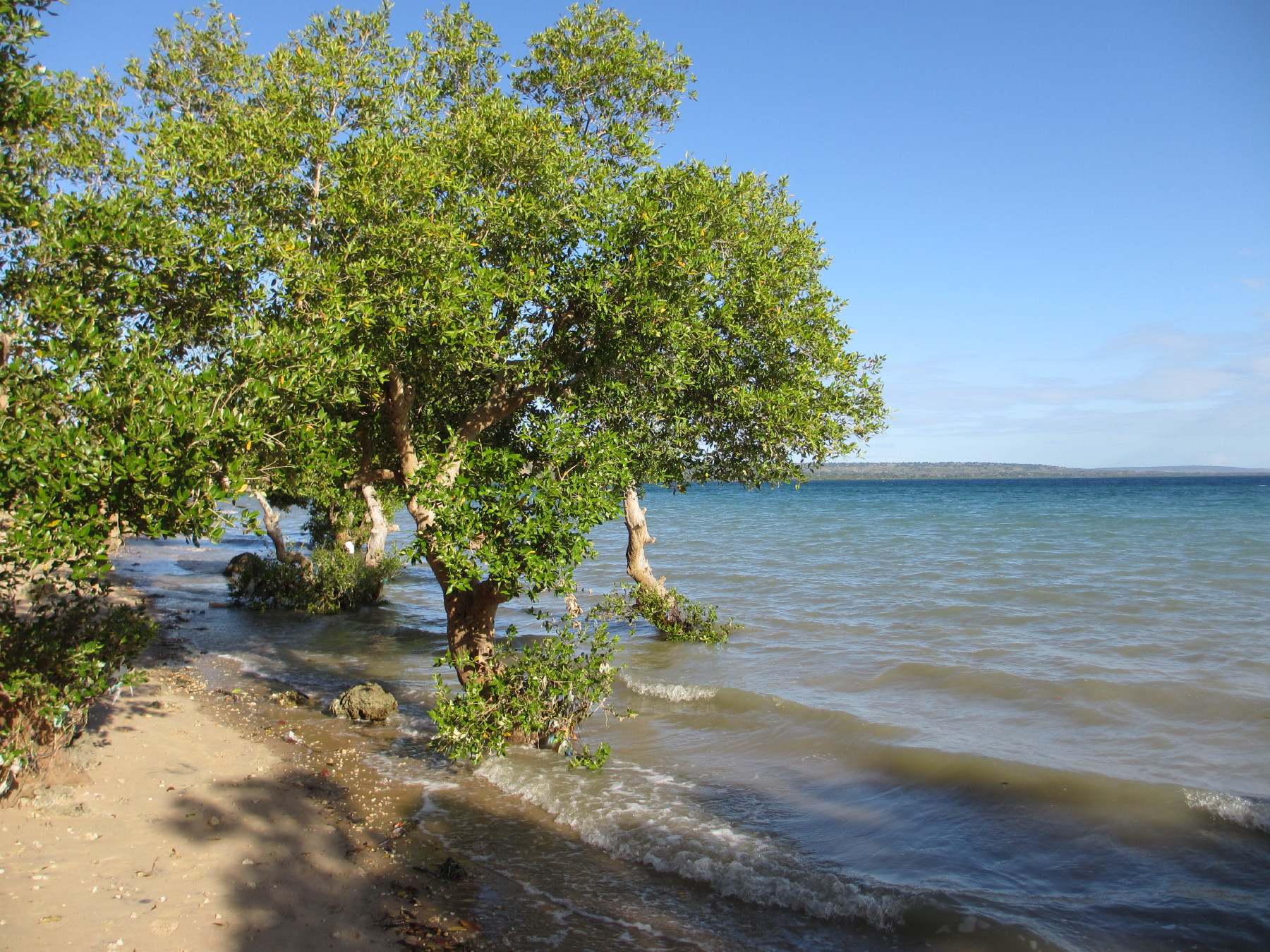
A white mangrove, Avicennia marina

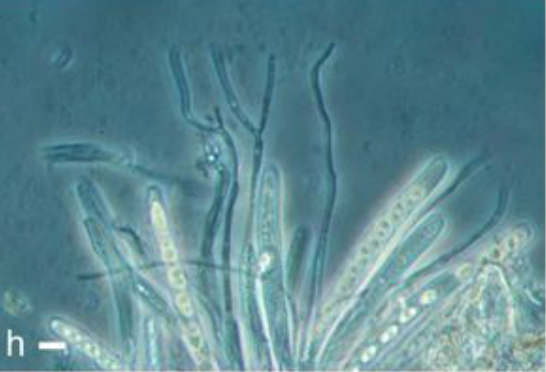
Annabella australiensis, a helotialean fungi found on the decaying wood of an Australian white mangrove

The greatest number of known species of marine fungi are from mangrove swamps. In one study, blocks of mangrove wood and pieces of driftwood of Avicennia alba, Bruguiera cylindrica and Rhizophora apiculata were examined to identify the lignicolous (wood-decaying) fungi they hosted. Also tested were Nypa fruticans, a mangrove palm and Acanthus ilicifolius, a plant often associated with mangroves. Each material was found to have its own characteristic fungi, the greatest diversity being among those growing on the mangrove palm. It was surmised that this was because the salinity was lower in the estuaries and creeks where Nypa grew, and so it required a lesser degree of adaptation for the fungi to flourish there. Some of these species were closely related to fungi on terrestrial palms. Other studies have shown that driftwood hosts more species of fungus than do exposed test blocks of wood of a similar kind. The mangrove leaf litter also supported a large fungal community which was different from that on the wood and living material. However, few of these were multicellular, higher marine fungi.

=== Other plants ===
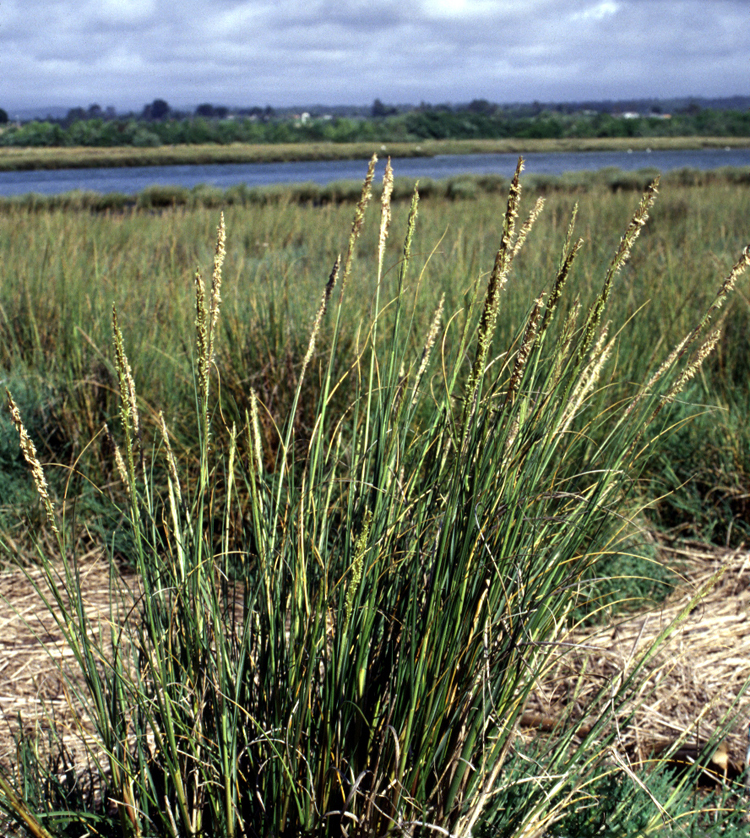
Spartina plant

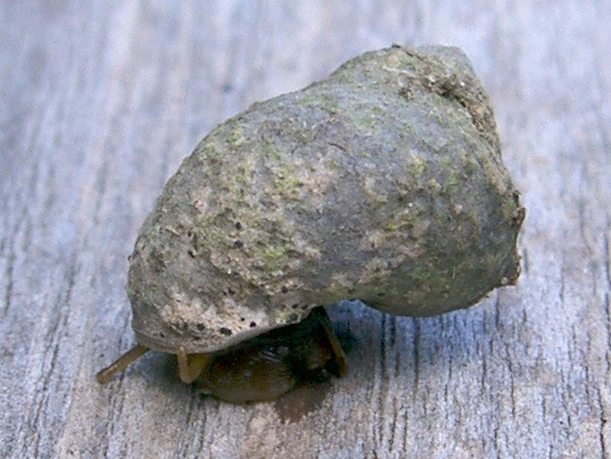
The shell of this sea snail, Littoraria irrorata, is covered with the lichen Pyrenocollema halodytes

The sea snail Littoraria irrorata damages plants of Spartina in the coastal sea marshes where it lives, which enables spores of intertidal ascomycetous fungi to colonise the plant. The snail eats the fungal growth in preference to the grass itself. This mutualism between the snail and the fungus is considered to be the first example of husbandry among invertebrate animals outside the class Insecta.

Eelgrass, Zostera marina, is sometimes affected by seagrass wasting disease. The primary cause of this seems to be pathogenic strains of the protist Labyrinthula zosterae, but it is thought that fungal pathogens also contribute and may predispose the eelgrass to disease.

== Wood ==
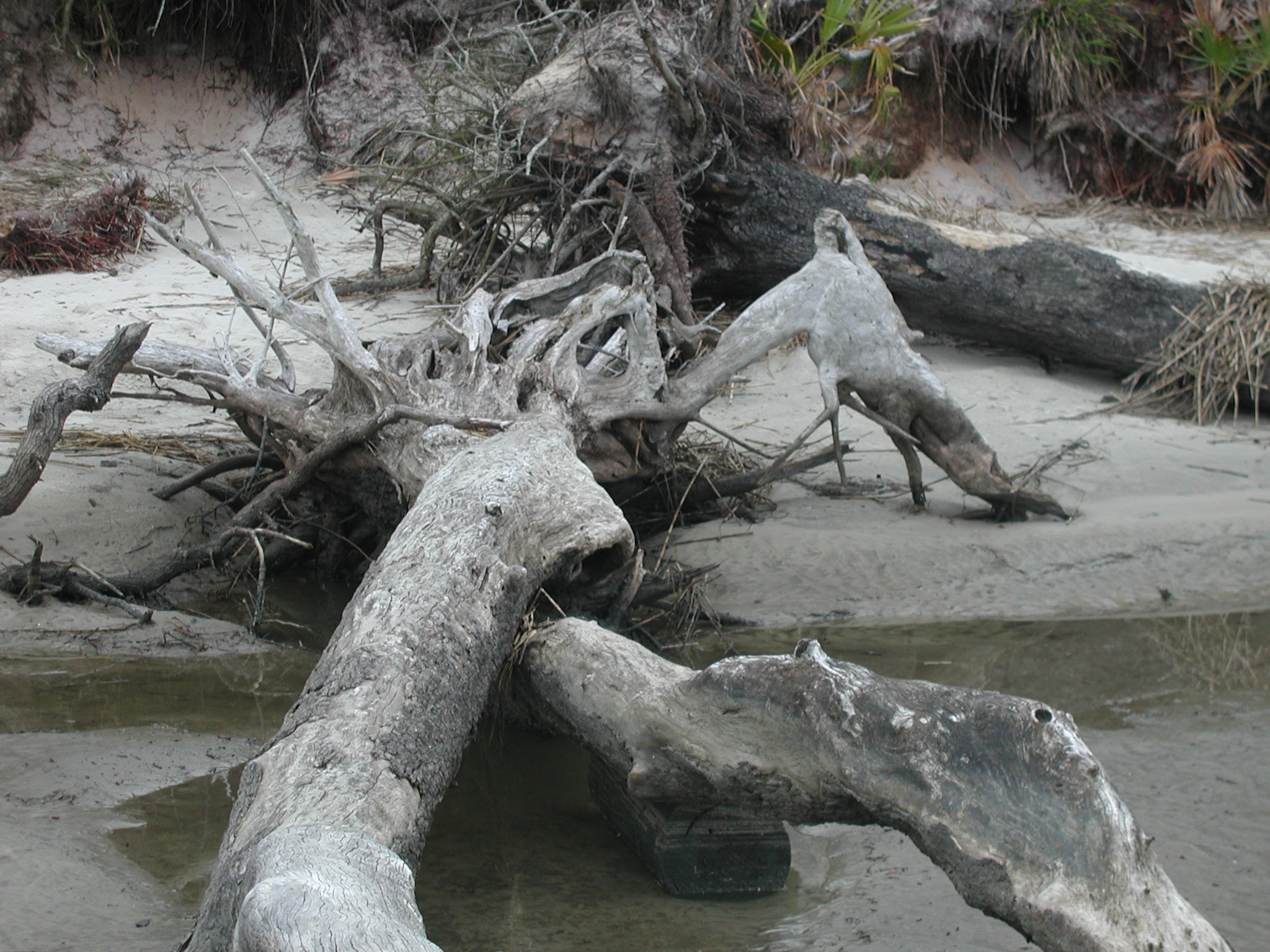
Driftwood

Many marine fungi are very specific as to which species of floating and submerged wood they colonise. A range of species of fungi colonise beech, while oak supports a different community. When a fungal propagule lands on a suitable piece of wood, it will grow if no other fungi are present. If the wood is already colonised by another fungal species, growth will depend on whether that fungus produces antifungal chemicals and whether the new arrival can resist them. The chemical properties of colonizing fungi also affect the animal communities that graze on them: in one study, when hyphae from five different species of marine fungi were fed to nematodes, one species supported less than half the number of nematodes per mg of hyphae than did the others.

Detection of fungi in wood may involve incubation at a suitable temperature in a suitable water medium for a period of six months to upward of eighteen months.

== Lichens ==
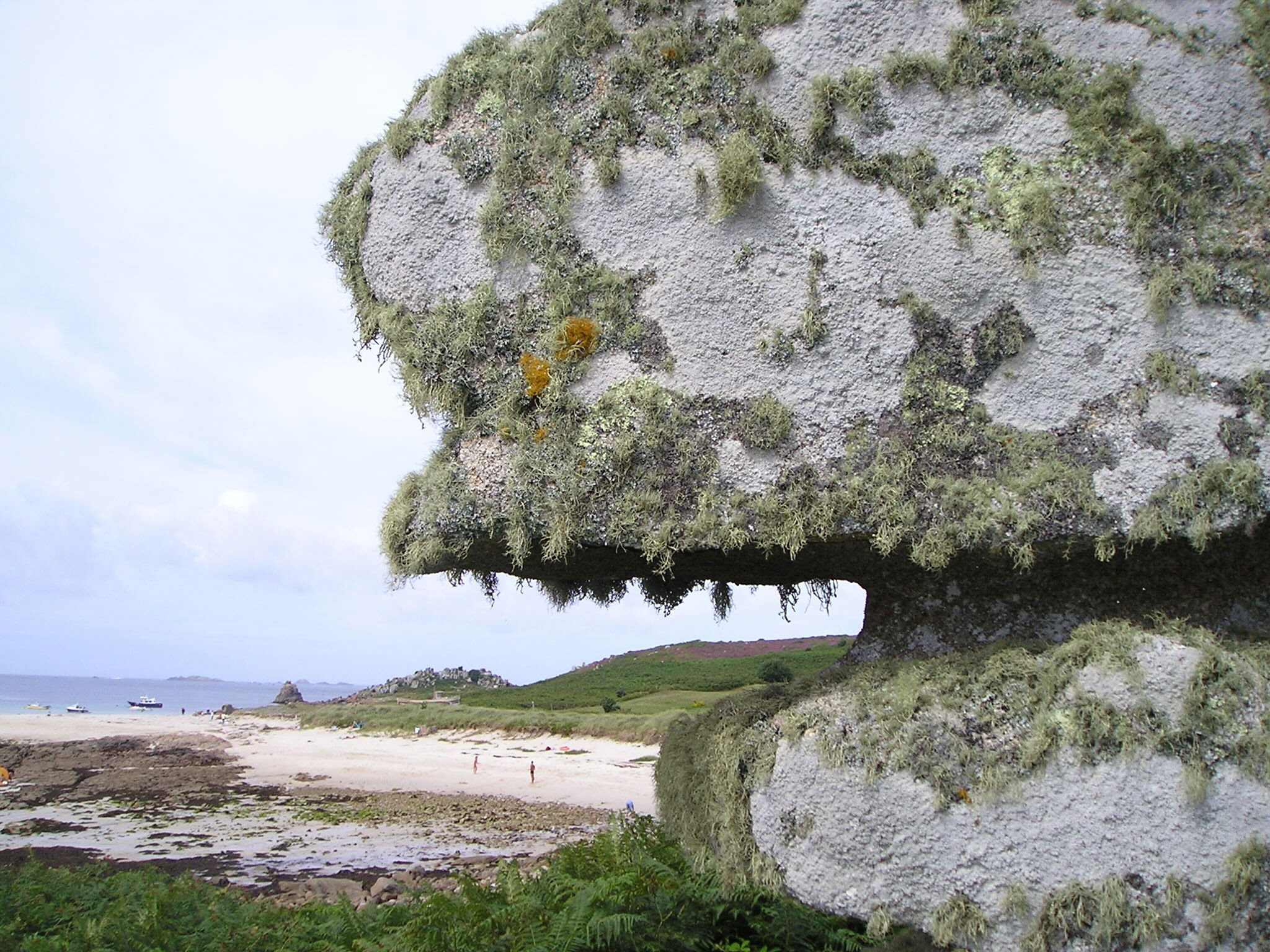
Lichen covered rocks

Lichens are mutualistic associations between fungi, usually an ascomycete with a basidiomycete, and an alga or a cyanobacterium. Several lichens, including Arthopyrenia halodytes, Pharcidia laminariicola, Pharcidia rhachiana and Turgidosculum ulvae, are found in marine environments. Many more occur in the splash zone, where they occupy different vertical zones depending on how tolerant they are to submersion. Lichen-like fossils have been found in the Doushantuo Formation in China dating back about 600 million years ago.

Fungi from Verrucariales also form marine lichens with the brown algae Petroderma maculiforme, and have a symbiotic relationship with seaweed like (rockweed) and Blidingia minima, where the algae are the dominant components. The fungi is thought to help the rockweeds to resist desiccation when exposed to air. In addition, lichens can also use yellow-green algae (Heterococcus) as their symbiotic partner.

Lichen-like fossils consisting of coccoid cells (cyanobacteria?) and thin filaments (mucoromycotinan Glomeromycota?) are permineralized in marine phosphorite of the Doushantuo Formation in southern China. These fossils are thought to be 551 to 635 million years old or Ediacaran. Ediacaran acritarchs also have many similarities with Glomeromycotan vesicles and spores. It has also been claimed that Ediacaran fossils including Dickinsonia, were lichens, although this claim is controversial. Endosymbiotic Glomeromycota comparable with living Geosiphon may extend back into the Proterozoic in the form of 1500 million year old Horodyskia and 2200 million year old Diskagma. Discovery of these fossils suggest that marine fungi developed symbiotic partnerships with photoautotrophs long before the evolution of vascular plants. However a 2019 study concluded through age estimations obtained by time calibrated phylogenies, and absence of unambiguous fossil data that the origins of lichens postdate the evolution of vascular plants.

Not to be confused with lichens are Mycophycobiosis, similar to lichens in being a symbiosis of an algae and a fungus. In mycophycobiosis the algae forms the external, multicellular structure housing the fungus. The reproduction of both partners is always disjoint.

== Invertebrates ==
The American lobster (Homarus americanus), like many other marine crustaceans, incubates its eggs beneath its tail segments. Here they are exposed to water-borne micro-organisms including fungi during their long period of development. The lobster has a symbiotic relationship with a gram-negative bacterium that has anti-fungal properties. This bacterium grows over the eggs and protects them from infection by the pathogenic fungus-like oomycete Lagenidium callinectes. The metabolite produced by the bacterium is tyrosol, a 4-hydroxyphenethyl alcohol, an antibiotic substance also produced by some terrestrial fungi. Similarly, a shrimp found in estuaries, Palaemon macrodactylis, has a symbiotic bacterium that produces 2,3-indolenedione, a substance that is also toxic to the oomycete Lagenidium callinectes.

== Vertebrates ==
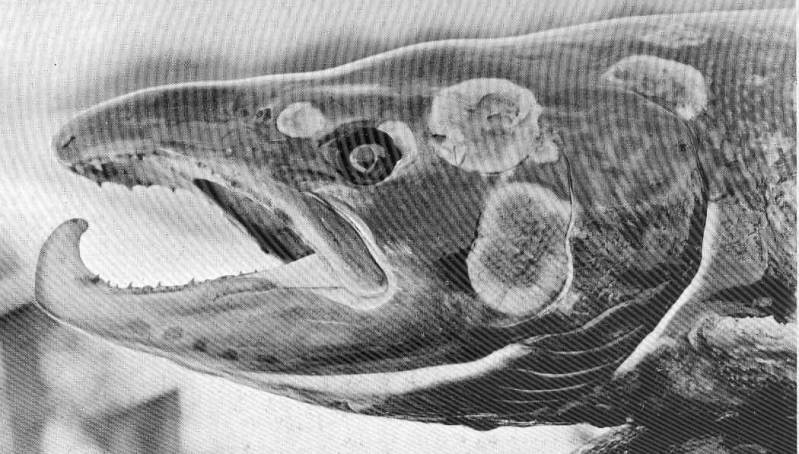
Salmon with fungal disease

Whales, porpoises and dolphins are susceptible to fungal diseases but these have been little researched in the field. Mortalities from fungal disease have been reported in captive orcas; it is thought that stress due to captive conditions may have been predisposing. Transmission among animals in the open sea may naturally limit the spread of fungal diseases. Infectious fungi known from orcas include Aspergillus fumigatus, Candida albicans and Saksenaea vasiformis. Fungal infections in other cetaceans include Coccidioides immitis, Cryptococcus neoformans, Loboa loboi, Rhizopus sp., Aspergillus flavus, Blastomyces dermatitidis, Cladophialophora bantiana, Histoplasma capsulatum, Mucor sp., Sporothrix schenckii and Trichophyton sp.

Salmonids farmed in cages in marine environments may be affected by a number of different fungal infections. Exophiala salmonis causes an infection in which growth of hyphae in the kidneys causes swelling of the abdomen. A cellular response by the fish aims to isolate the fungus by walling it off. Fish are also susceptible to fungus-like oomycetes including Branchiomyces which affects the gills of various fishes, and Saprolegnia which attacks damaged tissue.

== Arctic marine fungi ==
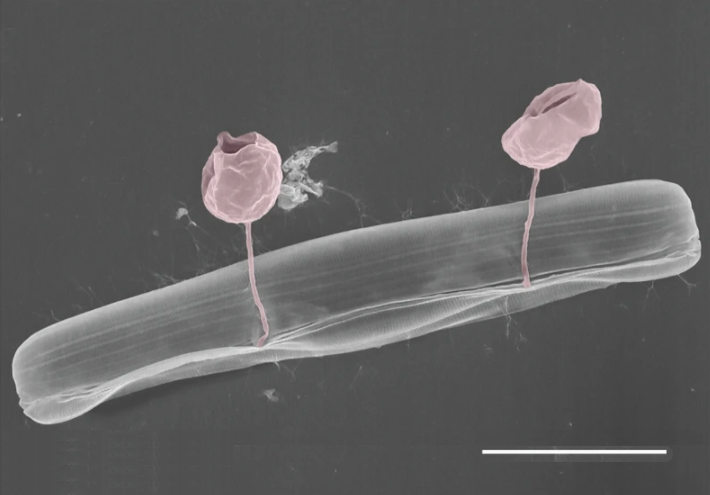
Pennate diatom from an Arctic meltpond, infected with two chytrid-like [zoo-]sporangium fungal pathogens (in false-colour red). Scale bar = 10 μm.

Marine fungi have been observed as far north as the Arctic Ocean. Chytridiomycota, the dominant parasitic fungal organism in Arctic waters, take advantage of phytoplankton blooms in brine channels caused by warming temperatures and increased light penetration through the ice. These fungi parasitize diatoms, thereby controlling algal blooms and recycling carbon back into the microbial food web. Arctic blooms also provide conducive environments for other parasitic fungi. Light levels and seasonal factors, such as temperature and salinity, also control chytrid activity independently of phytoplankton populations. During periods of low temperatures and phytoplankton levels, Aureobasidium and Cladosporium populations overtake those of chytrids within the brine channels.

== Marine sediment ==
Ascomycota, Basidiomycota, and Chytridiomycota have been observed in marine sediments ranging in depth from 0 to 1740 meters beneath the ocean floor. One study analyzed subsurface samples of marine sediment between these depths and isolated all observable fungi. Isolates showed that most subsurface fungal diversity was found between depths of 0 to 25 meters below the sea floor with Fusarium oxysporum and Rhodotorula mucilaginosa being the most prominent. Overall, the ascomycota are the dominant subsurface phylum. Almost all fungal species recovered have also been observed in terrestrial sediments with spore-sourcing indicating terrestrial origin.

Contrary to previous beliefs, deep subsurface marine fungi actively grow and germinate, with some studies showing increased growth rates under high hydrostatic pressures. Though the methods by which marine fungi are able to survive the extreme conditions of the seafloor and below is largely unknown, Saccharomyces cerevisiae shines some light onto adaptations that make it possible. This fungus strengthens its outer membrane in order to endure higher hydrostatic pressures.

Several sediment-dwelling marine fungi are involved in biogeochemical processes. Fusarium oxysporum and Fusarium solani are denitrifiers both in marine and terrestrial environments. Some are co-denitrifying, fixing nitrogen into nitrous oxide and dinitrogen. Still others process organic matter including carbohydrate, proteins, and lipids. Ocean crust fungi, like those found around hydrothermal vents, decompose organic matter, and play various roles in manganese and arsenic cycling.

Sediment-bound marine fungi played a major role in breaking down oil spilled from the Deepwater Horizons disaster in 2010. Aspergillus, Penicillium, and Fusarium species, among others, can degrade high-molecular-weight hydrocarbons as well as assist hydrocarbon-degrading bacteria.

== Fungal dark matter ==
Microbial dark matter are microbial organisms microbiologists cannot culture in laboratories, due to lack of knowledge of the required growth conditions. Most microbial organisms fall in this category. Fungal dark matter refers specifically to the vast number of fungal species that are known only through environmental DNA (eDNA) sequencing but cannot be cultured, observed morphologically, or formally described under current taxonomic rules. These fungi, also called dark fungi or dark taxa, are detected via genetic material in soil, water, or other substrates, but their physical forms (e.g., fruiting bodies) or ecological roles remain largely unknown due to their resistance to cultivation and lack of visible structures. There is some analogy to cosmological dark matter, which is inferred but not directly observed, and are significant because they may dominate fungal diversity.

== Human uses ==
=== Medical ===
Marine fungi produce antiviral and antibacterial compounds as metabolites with upwards of 1,000 having realized and potential uses as anticancer, anti-diabetic, and anti-inflammatory drugs.

The antiviral properties of marine fungi were realized in 1988 after their compounds were used to successfully treat the H1N1 flu virus. In addition to H1N1, antiviral compounds isolated from marine fungi have been shown to have virucidal effects on HIV, herpes simplex 1 and 2, Porcine Reproductive and Respiratory Syndrome Virus, and Respiratory Syncytial Virus. Most of these antiviral metabolites were isolated from species of Aspergillus, Penicillium, Cladosporium, Stachybotrys, and Neosartorya. These metabolites inhibit the virus's ability to replicate, thereby slowing infections.

Mangrove-associated fungi have prominent antibacterial effects on several common pathogenic human bacteria including, Staphylococcus aureus and Pseudomonas aeruginosa. High competition between organisms within mangrove niches lead to increases in antibacterial substances produced by these fungi as defensive agents. Penicillium and Aspergillus species are the largest producers of antibacterial compounds among the marine fungi.

Various deep-sea marine fungi species have recently been shown to produce anti-cancer metabolites. One study uncovered 199 novel cytotoxic compounds with anticancer potential. In addition to cytotoxic metabolites, these compounds have structures capable of disrupting cancer-activated telomerases via DNA binding. Others inhibit the topoisomerase enzyme from continuing to aid in the repair and replication of cancer cells.

== See also ==
- Aspergillus sydowii
- Fungal loop hypothesis
- Lichina
- Psathyrella aquatica
