= Mycophycobiosis =

Symbiotic organism

A mycophycobiosis (composed of myco-, from the Ancient Greek: μύκης (mukês, "mushroom"), phyco-, from Ancient Greek: φῦκος, (phûkos, fucus, used for algae), and -biose, from ancient Greek: βιόω (bióô, "to spend one's life") is a symbiotic organism made up of a multicellular alga and an ascomycete fungus housed inside the alga (in the thallus for example). The alga and fungus involved in this association are called mycophycobionts.

The essential role of the alga is to carry out photosynthesis, while that of the fungus is less obvious, but it could be linked to the transfer of minerals within the thallus, to a repellent effect on herbivores and, above all, to resistance to desiccation of this living organism in the intertidal zone.

Such symbioses have been reported in a few green algae (Prasiola, Blidingia) and red algae (Apophlaea), both in seawater and in freshwater.

== Definition elements ==
Although compared to lichens by certain authors, mycophycobioses carry out an association of the opposite type: the algal partner is multicellular and forms the external structure of the symbiotic organization. Moreover, the reproduction of the two partners is always disjoint (the alga and the fungus reproduce separately).

According to Hawksworth the physiology of this symbiosis could well be comparable to that of lichens, but it remains to be better explored. Unlike lichens, mycophycobioses look like an algal partner, which remains fertile. These associations appear to be less coevolved than lichens, as they exhibit neither joint asexual multiplication of partners nor do they contain the equivalent lichen products.

== History ==
The term mycophycobiosis was introduced by Jan and Erika Kohlmeyer in 1972, based on the case of the brown algal species Ascophyllum nodosum, which regularly harbours the ascomycete Mycosphaerella ascophylli.

Another example of mycophycobiosis occurs in the genus Turgidosculum, which associates a green alga of the genus Prasiola with an ascomycete pyrenomycete of the genus Mastodia. While the only alga of the genus Prasiola remains subservient to a certain at least temporary marine cover, the mycophycobiotic association allows a more terrestrial conquest outside the intertidal zone.

Some authors hypothesize that vascular plants may have evolved from such a type of association and that this symbiosis may have helped land plants to conquer continents (similar to the association that gave rise to lichens).

== Major evolutionary role: exiting the waters ==
The major groups of carbon phototrophs, prokaryotes and eukaryotes, arose in the marine environment. The establishment of symbioses has made it possible to make a macroevolutionary leap to conquer the more hostile terrestrial environment. Various mutualistic associations (mycophycobioses, lichens, then mycorrhizae) have been simultaneously or successively used.

== Examples ==
In fresh water, the fungus Phaeospora lemaneae grows inside Lemanea fluviatilis.

In the marine environment, the fungus Blodgettia confervoides can associate with several species of Cladophora. In the littoral zone of the Northern Atlantic, the fungus Mycophycias ascophylli associates with Ascophyllum nodosum (black seaweed) or another Fucaceae, Pelvetia canaliculata.
