= Blidingia dawsonii =

Scientific classification
- Kingdom: Plantae
- Division: Chlorophyta
- Class: Ulvophyceae
- Order: Ulvales
- Family: Kornmanniaceae
- Genus: Blidingia
- Species: B. dawsonii

Binomial name
- Blidingia dawsonii (Hollenberg & I.A.Abbott) S.C.Lindstrom, L.A.Hanic & L.Golden

Synonyms
- Percursaria dawsonii Hollenberg & I.A.Abbott

Species of alga

Blidingia dawsonii is a species of seaweed from a family of Ulvaceae that can be found in Canada (British Columbia), Mexico, and US states such as California and Washington. It was described by Hollenberg & I.A.Abbott in 1968. The species are disputed over genus, which some believe to be Percursaria.
