= Stromatella =

Stromatella may refer to:

- Stromatella (lichen) Henssen, 1989, a genus of lichens in the family Lichinaceae
- Stromatella (alga) P. Kornmann & P.H. Sahling, 1985, a genus of algae in the family Chaetophoraceae
