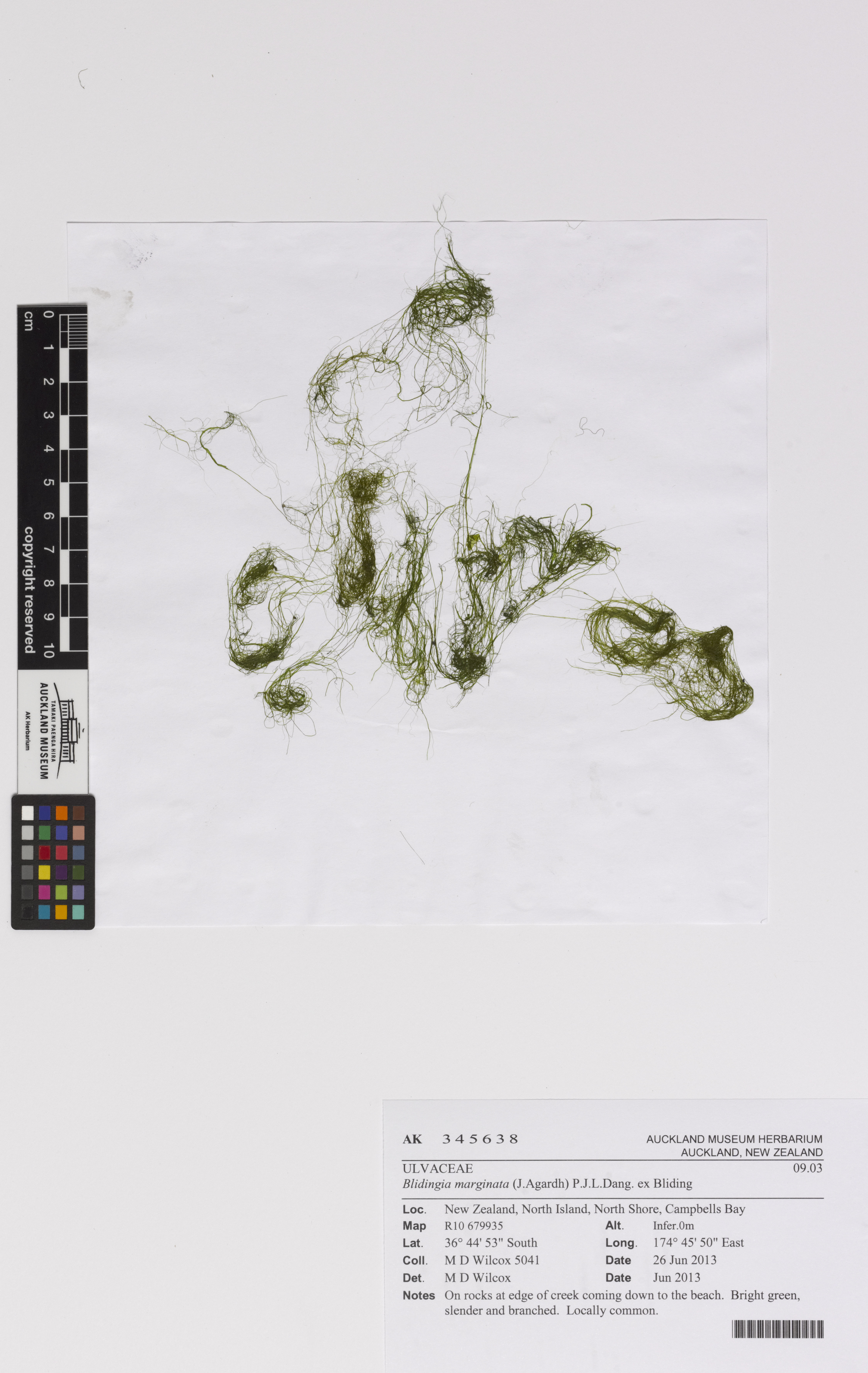

Scientific classification
- Clade: Viridiplantae
- Division: Chlorophyta
- Class: Ulvophyceae
- Order: Ulvales
- Family: Kornmanniaceae
- Genus: Blidingia
- Species: B. marginata

Binomial name
- Blidingia marginata (J.Agardh) P.J.L.Dangeard

Synonyms
- Enteromorpha marginata J.Agardh; Enteromorpha nana var. marginata (J.Agardh) V.J.Chapman

= Blidingia marginata =

Species of alga

Blidingia marginata is a species of seaweed in the Kornmanniaceae family.

== Description ==
The species is 2–5 centimetres (0.79–1.97 in) high, 100–200 μm (4–8×10−3 in) wide and 12–100 micrometres (0.00047–0.00394 in) thick. It has 15-20 cells, each of which is 10 micrometres (0.00039 in) long.

== Distribution ==
It can be found in such African countries as Azores, South Africa, Algeria, and Morocco. It can be found in various gulfs, oceans and seas such as Gulf of Maine and Gulf of Mexico, in Atlantic Ocean and Mediterranean Sea. It is also common on Bermuda, Cuba, and Tristan da Cunha. The North American distribution is varied by state in the United States but can be found in Canada and Mexico as well. The states that carry the species are Georgia, North Carolina, Virginia, Connecticut, Maine, Massachusetts and New Jersey. In Asia it is found only in Japan while in South America it is found in Argentina, Brazil and Uruguay.

=== Australasian distribution ===
It is found in New Zealand and southern Australia where it is found in Recherche Archipelago, Streaky Bay, Ardrossan and Port Adelaide.

=== European distribution ===
In Europe, it is found in Belgium, Ireland, France, Spain, Sweden, and United Kingdom. It is also common on the shores of Portugal and Norway.

== Habitat ==
The species is commonly found with Juncus species.
