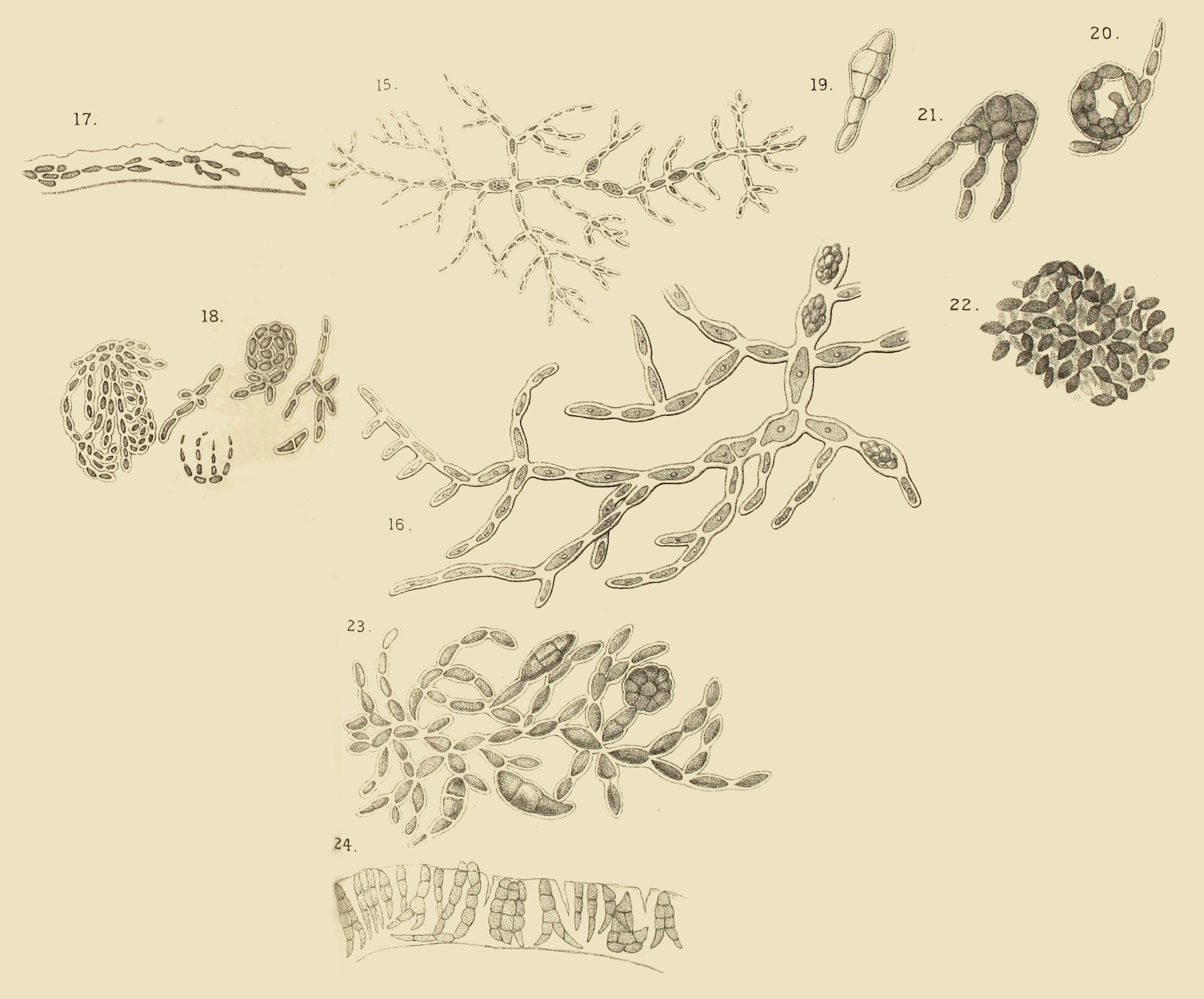
- Tellamia contorta Batters plate

Scientific classification
- Kingdom: Plantae
- Division: Chlorophyta
- Class: Ulvophyceae
- Order: Ulvales
- Family: Kornmanniaceae
- Genus: Tellamia; Batters, 1895
- Species: T. contorta

Binomial name
- Tellamia contorta Batters, 1895

Synonyms
- Tellamia intricata Batters, 1895

= Tellamia =

Genus of algae

Tellamia is a monotypic genus of green algae, in the family Kornmanniaceae. It has only one known species, Tellamia contorta Batters, 1895.

The genus was circumscribed by Edward Arthur Lionel Batters in Ann. Bot. (London) vol.9 on page 169 in 1895.

The genus name of Tellamia is in honour of Richard Vercoe Tellam (1826–1908), who was an English botanist, farmer and lay preacher.
