= Kornmannia =

Scientific classification
- Kingdom: Plantae
- Division: Chlorophyta
- Class: Ulvophyceae
- Order: Ulvales
- Family: Kornmanniaceae
- Genus: Kornmannia; Bliding

Species
- Kornmannia leptoderma

Genus of algae

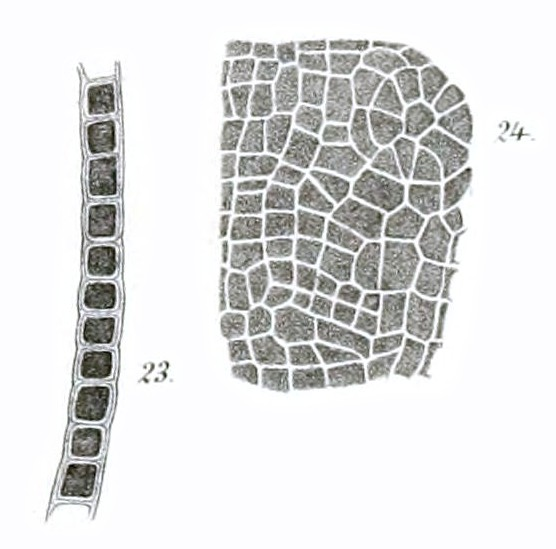

Kornmannia is a genus of green algae in the family Kornmanniaceae.

The genus name of Kornmannia is in honour of Peter Kornmann (1907-1993), who was a German botanist (Algology), who worked in the Biological Station on Helgoland.

The genus was circumscribed by Carl Vilhelm Bliding in Bot. Not. vol.121 on pages 610-615 in 1969.
