= Dilabifilum =

Scientific classification
- Clade: Viridiplantae
- Division: Chlorophyta
- Class: Ulvophyceae
- Order: Ulvales
- Family: Kornmanniaceae
- Genus: Dilabifilum; Tschermak-Woess, 1971

Genus of algae

Dilabifilum is a genus of thalloid green algae comprising approximately 4 species. The thalli take a crustose form. Choreonema reproduces by means of conceptacles; it produces tetraspores and dispores and carpospores. It is a source of agar.

== Species ==
The species currently recognised are: Dilabifilum arthropyreniae and Dilabifilum prostratum.
