= Dark septate endophyte =

Group of endophytic fungi

Dark septate endophytes (DSE) are a group of endophytic fungi characterized by their morphology of melanized, septate, hyphae. This group is paraphyletic, and contain conidial as well as sterile fungi that colonize roots intracellularly or intercellularly. Very little is known about the number of fungal taxa within this group, but all are in the Ascomycota. They are found in over 600 plant species and across 114 families of angiosperms and gymnosperms and co-occur with other types of mycorrhizal fungi. They have a wide global distribution and can be more abundant in stressed environments. Much of their taxonomy, physiology, and ecology are unknown.

== Taxonomy ==
Based on analysis of sequences with the small subunit of the nuclear ribosomal RNA gene (18S), all DSE are within ascomycetes and include taxa in the orders Pleoporales, Microascales, Xylariales, Pezizales, Dothideales, Leotiales, Chaetothyriales, Elaphomycetales, Eurotiales, Onygenales, Saccharomycetales, Neolectales, Taphrinales, Mitosporic, and nonsporulating cultures.

== Natural history ==
=== Geographical distribution ===
Dark septate endophytes have been found in the subantarctic, boreal coniferous forests in Canada, temperate and boreal forests in Northern and Central Europe, exotic pine plantations in New Zealand, temperate grasslands, epiphytic plants in tropical rain forests, alpine environments, and semi-arid environments. Studies in alpine and semi-arid ecosystems have shown that dark septate endophytes are more prevalent than arbuscular mycorrhizae in these environments.

=== Physiology and function ===
Different species and strains of DSE have been found to have enzymes including laccases, lipases, amylases, and polyphenol oxidases. They are capable of breaking down many organic compounds including starch, cellulose, laminari, xylan, gelatin, and RNA from detrital nutrient pools. Their nitrogen sources are varied, and dark septate endophytes are able to use amino acids (e.g. alanine, glycine, and arginine) equally as efficiently as ammonium, as well as other sources like guanine and uric acid. Some DSE are also able to hydrolyse organic sulphate.

A key characteristic of DSE is that they show high melanin content and appear darkened in morphology. This is hypothesized to protect hyphae from extremes in temperatures and drought and improve their persistence in the soil.

=== Plant hosts ===
Dark septate endophytes have been observed across the plant kingdom in Dicotyledoneae and Monocotyledonae (Angiospermae), and Equisetopsida, Lycopsida, Polypodiopsida, and Psilotopsida (Gymnospermae). Their diversity of hosts suggests little or no host-specificity in this group. They are found on plants that are non-mycorrhizal as well as plants with known arbuscular, ericoid, orchid, and ectomycorrhizal associations.

=== Colonization of host plant ===
Dark septate endophytes are plant root-colonizing fungi that are often darkly-pigmented, with septate hyphae, and form structures inside plant root cells such as microsclerotia. However, there is great variation in morphology within this group. Dark septate endophytes are observed more frequently in mature parts of the root system.

There are four main physiological structures of DSE colonization in plant roots. The runner hyphae are individual, superficial fungal strands following the depressions between epidermal cells. The appressorium is the swollen structure preceding penetration through a host cell wall. The penetration tube is the thin structure penetrating through the cell wall. The microsclerotia are the intracellular groups of hyphae with rounded, thick-walled cells. The frequent inter- and intracellular structures suggest that DSE gain nutrition from the plant host.

== Ecology ==
=== Interaction with other root-associated fungi ===
Dark septate endophytes frequently co-occur with mycorrhizal fungi such as arbuscular, ericoid, orchid, and ectomycorrhiza. There is some evidence that the different root-associated fungi interact. For example, ectomycorrhiza and DSE strains together increase plant biomass more than either alone.

=== Effects on host plants ===
Effects of DSE on host plants range from pathogenic to mutualistic, depending on environmental factors as well as both host and fungus genotypes. However, the majority of DSE studied showed that inoculation of DSE increased total, root, and shoot biomass by up to 80%.

Dark septate endophyte hyphae are much smaller in diameter compared to plant roots which allows them to access soil micropores unavailable to plants to forage for water and nutrients. Therefore, association with DSE can increase nitrogen and phosphorus content in host plant tissue. In arid ecosystems, DSE in the order Pleosporales are commonly found in both rhizosphere soils and surface biological soil crust communities, which suggests that they may aid in nutrient absorption by plants by linking plant roots and biological soil crusts that fix carbon and nitrogen in hyphal networks, which forms the basis of the Fungal Loop Hypothesis

The melanized cell walls of DSE may affect heat dissipation or form complexes with oxygen radicals in plant hosts, which can alter host thermal tolerance. Similar to other mycorrhizal fungi, DSE can protect hosts from pathogens or herbivores through the production of inhibitory metabolites, physical exclusion of other microorganisms, or melanized hyphae. Some fungi in the same genus as known DSE are known to produce antibacterial or antifungal compounds.
