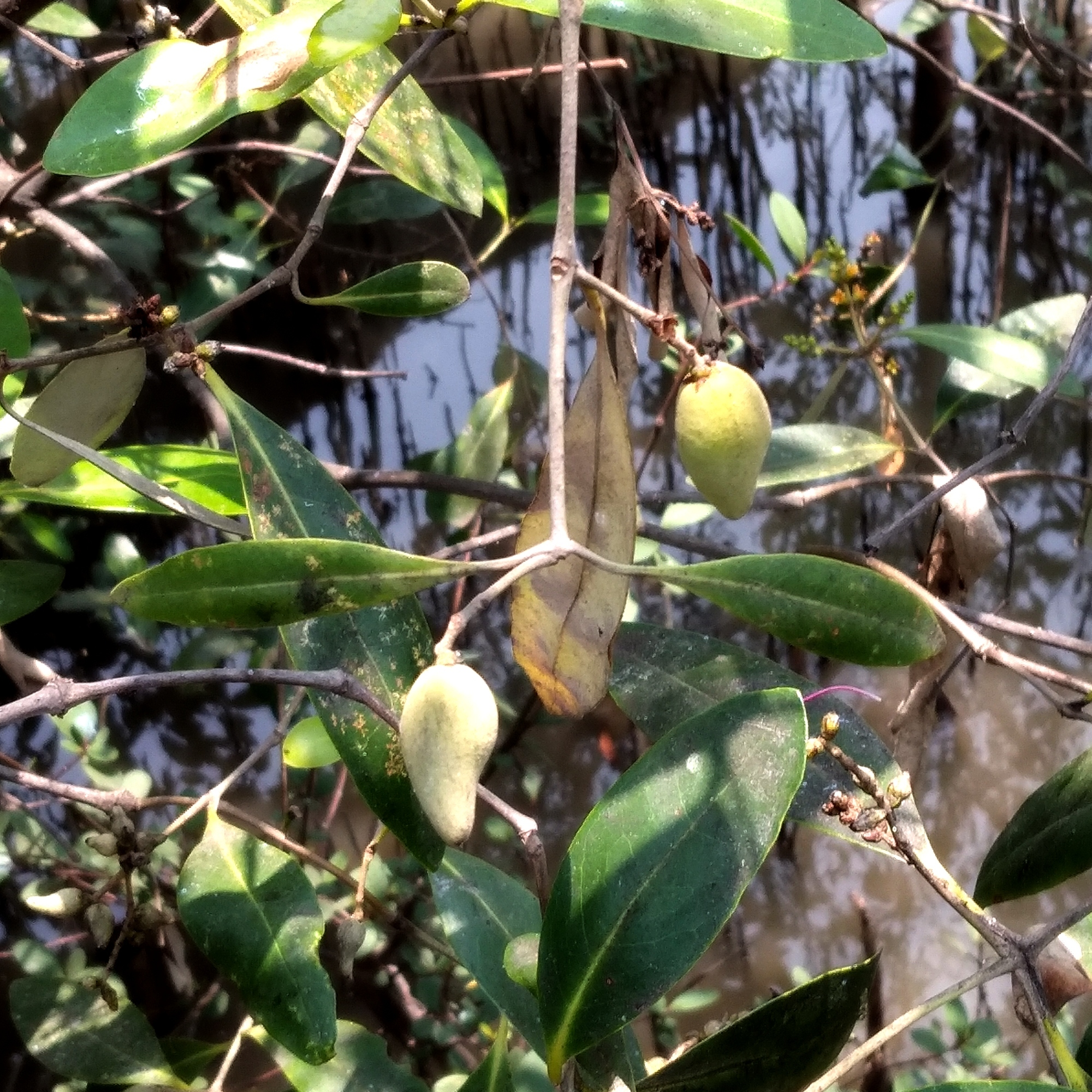

Conservation status
- Least Concern (IUCN 3.1)

Scientific classification
- Kingdom: Plantae
- Clade: Tracheophytes
- Clade: Angiosperms
- Clade: Eudicots
- Clade: Asterids
- Order: Lamiales
- Family: Acanthaceae
- Genus: Avicennia
- Species: A. alba

Binomial name
- Avicennia alba Blume

= Avicennia alba =

Species of plant

Avicennia alba is a species of tropical mangrove in the family Acanthaceae. It is found growing in coastal and estuarine locations in India, Southeast Asia, Australia, and Oceania.

== Description ==
A. alba forms a low, dense bushy crown often branching near the base of the trunk. The shrub does not grow more than about 20 m (66 ft) high. The roots are shallow and send up a large number of pencil-shaped pneumatophores. These aerial roots help with gas exchange and also play an important part in the exclusion of salt from the plant's vascular system. The trunk has smooth, greenish-black bark that is finely fissured and does not flake. The dark green leaves, 15 cm (6 in) long and 5 cm (2 in) wide, have a silvery grey underside and grow in opposite pairs. The small, orange-yellow flowers, borne in a racemose inflorescence, have four petals and a diameter of about 4 mm (0.16 in) when expanded. The fruits are greyish-green capsules and conical in shape with an elongated beak up to 4 cm (1.6 in) long. Each contains a single seed.

In the Malay language it is known as api api putih, api meaning "fire", referring to the fact that this mangrove attracts fireflies, and putih meaning "white", referring to the pale-coloured underside of the leaves.

== Distribution and habitat ==
A. alba is found off South and Southeast Asia, the islands of the South Pacific Ocean, and Australia. It is common in the Sungei Buloh Wetland Reserve in Singapore. It grows on tidal regions of riverbanks and on muddy portions of the seashore. It is a pioneering species, being one of the first to colonise new ground. Its widespread root system with large numbers of pneumatophores helps to stabilise new deposits of sediment.

== Biology ==
Because it is difficult for seedlings to become established in tide-swept muddy habitats, A. alba exhibits cryptovivipary. The embryos start to develop and break through the coat of the seeds before the fruits split open to shed the seeds. In some cases, the plant also exhibits vivipary, with the developing shoot breaking through the fruit capsule while it is still growing on the bush. The seedlings have hooked hairs and are often seen growing in tangled groups.

== Ecology ==
A number of invertebrates are associated with A. alba. The larvae of certain small moths, Euopoicillia spp., feed on the flower buds and those of another moth, Autoba alabastrata, feed on the fruits. The leaves are eaten by beetles, Monolepta spp. The greatest number of known species of marine fungi are found growing in mangrove swamps where A. alba is one of a number of species colonised.

== Status ==
Mangrove habitats in general are threatened by human activities such as coastal development, agriculture, and the creation of fish ponds. Rising sea levels due to global warming will also affect mangroves communities. A. alba is affected by these threats, but the IUCN Red List of Threatened Species lists it as being of least concern because it is a fast-growing species, recovers readily from being cut, is widely distributed, and is common over much of its range.

== Uses ==
A. alba is a fast-growing species and is sometimes planted, along with Sonneratia and Rhizophora, to help prevent coastal erosion.

The timber from A. alba does not make good firewood or charcoal, but is used in the smoking of rubber and of fish. An extract of the heartwood is used in herbal medicine to make a tonic, and the resin has been used in birth control. The seeds are boiled and eaten as a vegetable and are sometimes available in local markets.
