= Turgidosculum =

Scientific classification
- Kingdom: Fungi
- Division: Ascomycota
- Class: Eurotiomycetes
- Order: Verrucariales
- Family: Verrucariaceae
- Genus: Turgidosculum; Kohlm. & E.Kohlm. (1972)
- Species: T. ulvae

Binomial name
- Turgidosculum ulvae (M.Reed) Kohlm. & E.Kohlm. (1972)

Synonyms
- Guignardia ulvae M.Reed (1902); Laestadia ulvae (M.Reed) Sacc. & Traverso (1910)

Single-species fungal genus

Turgidosculum is a fungal genus in the family Verrucariaceae. It comprises the single species Turgidosculum ulvae. The fungus forms a lichen-like association with a green alga in the Blidingia minima complex, growing as dark green patches on rocky seashores in the intertidal zone. Originally described in 1902 as a parasite on algae, its unusual biology led to conflicting interpretations until molecular studies placed it within the Verrucariaceae. Confirmed records of the species come from the Pacific coast of North America, though the full distribution of the genus remains uncertain.

== Taxonomy ==
The genus Turgidosculum was introduced in 1972 by Jan and Erika Kohlmeyer for a marine ascomycete that lives in close association with a foliose (leafy) green alga and alters the alga's morphology, a biology that led to widely different interpretations of its relationships in earlier literature. The fungus had originally been described as Guignardia ulvae (1902) as a parasite on the green alga then called Ulva vexata (now treated under Blidingia). Because its reproductive structures were interpreted in different ways, the genus was variously placed in disparate higher-level groups, and some modern classification overviews either omitted it entirely or included it in Mastodiaceae (as an incertae sedis family concept).

Molecular and anatomical work has since tied Turgidosculum to the lichen family Verrucariaceae. In their 2018 multigene phylogenetic analysis, Pérez-Ortega and colleagues found that Turgidosculum ulvae falls unambiguously within Verrucariaceae, and they reinterpreted key characters that had driven earlier placements (for example, the asci were shown to be typically bitunicate rather than unitunicate, and the ascospores to be simple rather than two-celled). In the same study, all sequenced specimens of T. ulvae grouped with Verrucaria ditmarsica in a well-supported clade that is separated from other Verrucariaceae by a long branch, suggesting a distinct lineage associated with rocky seashores. Both T. ulvae and V. ditmarsica occupy the intertidal zone, and the authors noted that the V. ditmarsica concept has been applied broadly and may conceal additional, still-unnamed species. They therefore treated the limits of the group as unresolved and stated that further work is needed to decide how broadly the clade should be circumscribed and whether Turgidosculum is the correct generic name for all of its members.

In current fungal name repositories, Turgidosculum is treated as a monospecific genus centred on the type species T. ulvae. A second name that has sometimes been associated with the genus, Turgidosculum complicatulum, is treated instead as a synonym of Mastodia tessellata.

== Description ==
In its sole accepted species, Turgidosculum ulvae, the fungus lives in a tight, persistent partnership with a green alga in the Blidingia minima species complex. Together they form a simple, lichen-like thallus in which a compact fungal "core" (medulla) is bordered on both sides by algal cells, with the fungal hyphae embedded in a dense matrix and a gelatinous layer present at the outer surface. Fungal hyphae can grow between individual algal cells and into the algal layer, physically separating the cells and altering the alga's normal tissue structure.

At the microscopic interface, the fungus produces peg-like wall outgrowths and haustorium-like structures that push into the algal cell wall but do not visibly breach the cell membrane. In the material studied, this intimate contact was not associated with obvious injury to healthy algal cells. Pérez-Ortega and colleagues interpreted fungal hyphae inside dying, collapsed algal cells as a late, saprophytic phase, and suggested that the haustorial system also contributes to mechanical integration of the combined tissue and to exchange between partners. Reproductive characters reported in the same study include typically bitunicate asci (with the outer wall soon lost) and simple (one-celled) ascospores.

== Habitat and distribution ==
Turgidosculum ulvae is a marine, shore-dwelling fungus that occurs on rocky coasts in the intertidal zone. It grows in a close association with a foliose green alga in the Blidingia minima complex, forming dark green, lichen-like patches among (and often surrounded by) otherwise typical Blidingia thalli. As of the molecular study by Pérez-Ortega and colleagues (2018), genetically confirmed material was sequenced from the Pacific coast of North America, with collections from Lands End in San Francisco, California. The authors also noted that the lineage containing T. ulvae may include additional, still-unnamed relatives and that further work is needed to determine the full diversity and range of this marine group.
