= Fungal loop hypothesis =

Hypothesis about soil fungi

The fungal loop hypothesis suggests that soil fungi in arid ecosystems connect the metabolic activity of plants and biological soil crusts which respond to different soil moisture levels. Compiling diverse evidence such as limited accumulation of soil organic matter, high phenol oxidative and proteolytic enzyme potentials due to microbial activity, and symbioses between plants and fungi, the fungal loop hypothesis suggests that carbon and nutrients are cycled in biotic pools rather than leached or effluxed to the atmosphere during and between pulses of precipitation.

== Theory development ==
The fungal loop hypothesis is similar in concept to the microbial loop hypotheses in oceans or soil, more specifically for arid ecosystems. That is because of characteristics specific to arid ecosystems that are not found elsewhere.

=== Pulse dynamics ===
In arid ecosystems, there is low total precipitation and high variability in size of rain events (pulses) within and between years. Differences in how plants and decomposers respond to these pulses of precipitation affects biogeochemical cycling within the ecosystem. For example, extracellular enzymes present in the soil become active nearly instantaneously after any moisture pulse, while production in microbes and plants have lag times of various durations, and require pulse events of different sizes.

=== Patchy distribution of nutrient pools ===
Arid ecosystems also often have patchy distributions of vascular plants with bare patches of soil in between. Such vegetation reduces radiation and wind speed at the soil surface which reduces evaporation and thus creates favorable microhabitats for other species. In addition, as plants senesce and become litter, this increases carbon and nitrogen contents in the top layers of soil under plant canopies. Together, these effects create “islands of fertility” where plants are distributed.

In the bare soil between plants, biological soil crusts are often present. Crust microorganisms can fix carbon and nitrogen from the atmosphere as well as trap nitrogen-rich dust. Therefore, biology soil crusts contribute to carbon content and nutrient resources in soil surfaces where plant cover is low.

=== The role of fungi in biogeochemical cycling ===
Litter produced by plants must be broken down by decomposers into nutrients available to organisms. Both bacteria and fungi produce extracellular enzymes to break down large molecules into compounds that can be taken up by plants. However, fungi can metabolize at higher temperatures and lower water potentials than bacteria. Therefore, in arid ecosystems where precipitation falls during the hot season, fungi are likely the most important contributors to nutrient cycling due to their tolerance to temperature and ability to persist during long dry periods. In several sites in the southwestern US, denitrification and nitrification were shown to be mostly carried out by fungi.

=== The fungal loop ===
In arid ecosystems, many primary producers, such as grasses and biological soil crusts, form symbioses with fungi. Mycorrhizal fungi colonizing plant roots acquire carbon directly from plant roots, provide phosphorus sources to plants, and have been shown to transport water. Dark septate endophytes (DSE) are also common in many aridland plants and are hypothesized to perform similar roles as mycorrhizal fungi. Fungi are an integral part of the biological soil crust community, and similar fungal taxa have been found in biological soil crusts and plant root zones, which suggests hyphal connections between these two spatially separate organisms.

The fungal loop hypothesis suggests that biological soil crusts and associated microbes are able to become active after smaller water pulses compared to vascular plants, which require more water to become active. However, fungi are able to take up the nutrients produced by biological soil crusts at lower water potentials, and keep them in the biotic pool until larger water pulses allow plants to become active and take up those nutrients. Active plants then are able to contribute excess carbon from photosynthesis to their fungal symbionts. Therefore, root-associated fungi symbiotic with plants and biological soil crusts connect the spatially- and temporally-distinct activities of crusts and plants.

== Evidence ==
Evidence of conditions favorable to the existence of a fungal loop is readily available. However, direct experimental tests of the hypothesis in arid ecosystems are still relatively rare. One study used isotopic labeling to trace where nitrate and glutamate moved when provided to biological soil crust or to grass foliage a distance away. They found that organic and inorganic N could be dispersed up to 100 cm per day bidirectionally between plants and crust. Other research has shown evidence of bidirectional transport in soil-fungal-plant connections in redistributing water in arid ecosystems.

== See also ==
- Mycoloop
