= Stromatella (alga) =

Scientific classification
- Kingdom: Plantae
- Division: Chlorophyta
- Class: Ulvophyceae
- Order: Ulvales
- Family: Kornmanniaceae
- Genus: Stromatella; Kornmann & Sahling

Species
- Stromatella monostromatica; Stromatella papillosa

Genus of algae

Stromatella is a genus of green algae in the family Kornmanniaceae.
