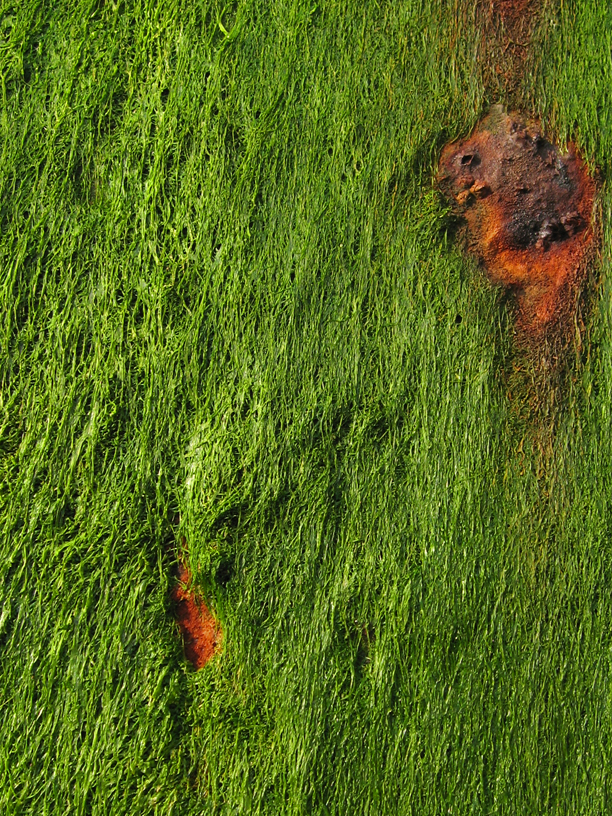
- Blidingia minima at the Heligoland mole

Scientific classification
- Clade: Viridiplantae
- Division: Chlorophyta
- Class: Ulvophyceae
- Order: Ulvales
- Family: Kornmanniaceae
- Genus: Blidingia; Kylin

Species
- Blidingia chadefaudii; Blidingia dawsonii; Blidingia marginata; Blidingia minima; Blidingia ramifera; Blidingia subsalsa; Blidingia tuberculosa

= Blidingia =

Genus of algae

Blidingia is a genus of green algae in the family Kornmanniaceae.
