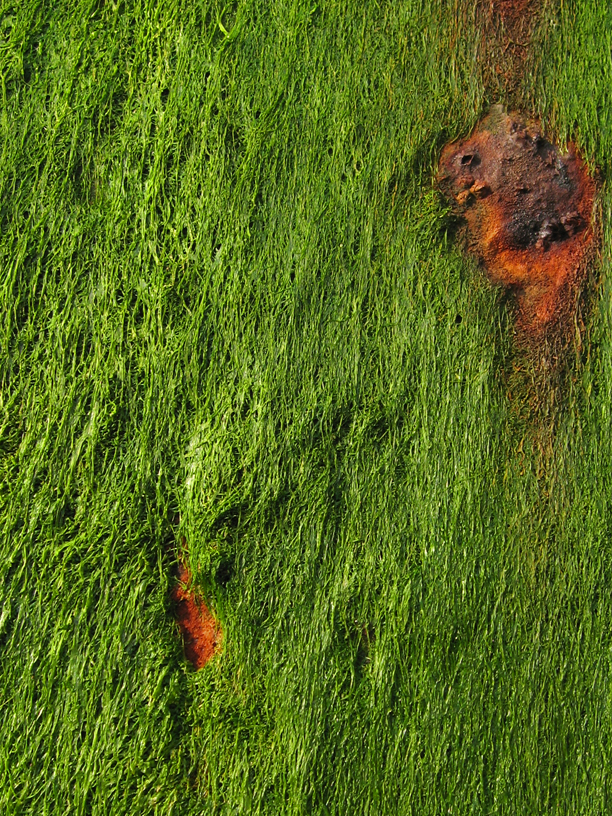

Scientific classification
- Clade: Viridiplantae
- Division: Chlorophyta
- Class: Ulvophyceae
- Order: Ulvales
- Family: Kornmanniaceae
- Genus: Blidingia
- Species: B. minima

Binomial name
- Blidingia minima (Nägeli ex Kützing) Kylin

Synonyms
- Enteromorpha minima Nägeli ex Kützing

= Blidingia minima =

Species of alga

Blidingia minima is a species of seaweed in the Kornmanniaceae family. It was described by Johann Kylin in 1947.

== Description ==
The species is 1–10 centimetres (0.39–3.94 in) long by 1–2 millimetres (0.039–0.079 in) wide and is light green in colour. It fronds are tubular with it cell arrangement being irregular and 10 micrometres (0.00039 in) in diameter. Stellate chloroplasts also exist. The tubes rise in groups from the center. It thalli grow as clusters which carry cylindrical and hollow tubes which arise from discoidal cushion. The tubes are 1–20 millimetres (0.039–0.787 in) long and 2 millimetres (0.079 in) wide. Thallus cells are 7 micrometres (0.00028 in) wide and are angular.

== Distribution ==
The type locality of this species is Helgoland, Germany. The species is found throughout eastern part of Asia in such countries as China, Japan, Korea and eastern part of Russia. It is also found in Azores, Canada, Norway, South Africa, United States, and various gulfs, seas and oceans, such as Gulf of Maine and Gulf of Mexico and in Atlantic and Pacific Oceans and Wadden Sea. Besides this places it have a type locality which is and is also common in Ireland and Great Britain. It was also recorded in Queensland, Australia.

=== English distribution ===
In England, the species was recorded from East Sussex.

== Habitat ==
It is found growing on cobble, boulders, bedrocks, barnacles, driftwood and even on different algae species throughout the semi-protected and protected areas.

== Ecology ==
Blidingia minima is considered to be a food for periwinkles.
