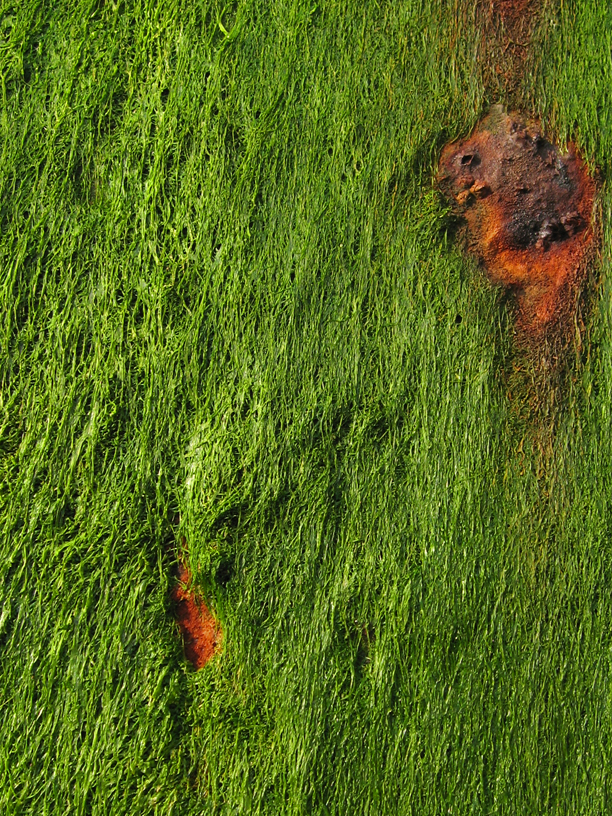
- Blidingia minima at the Heligoland mole

Scientific classification
- Domain: Eukaryota
- Supergroup: Archaeplastida
- Clade: Viridiplantae
- Division: Chlorophyta
- Class: Ulvophyceae
- Order: Ulvales
- Family: Kornmanniaceae; L.Golden & K.M.Cole

Genera
- see text

= Kornmanniaceae =

Family of algae

Kornmanniaceae is a family of green algae in the order Ulvales.

== Accepted genera ==
1. Blidingia Kylin
2. Kornmannia Bliding
3. Lithotrichon Darienko & Pröschold
4. Neostromatella M.J.Wynne, G.Furnari & R.Nielsen
5. Pseudendoclonium Wille
6. Tellamia Batters

=== Synonyms ===
- Dilabifilum Tschermak-Woess, 1971, nom. inval., currently regarded as a synonym of Pseudendoclonium.
- Stromatella Kornmann & Sahling, 1985, nom. inval., currently regarded as a synonym of Neostromatella.
