= List of Ulvophyceae genera =

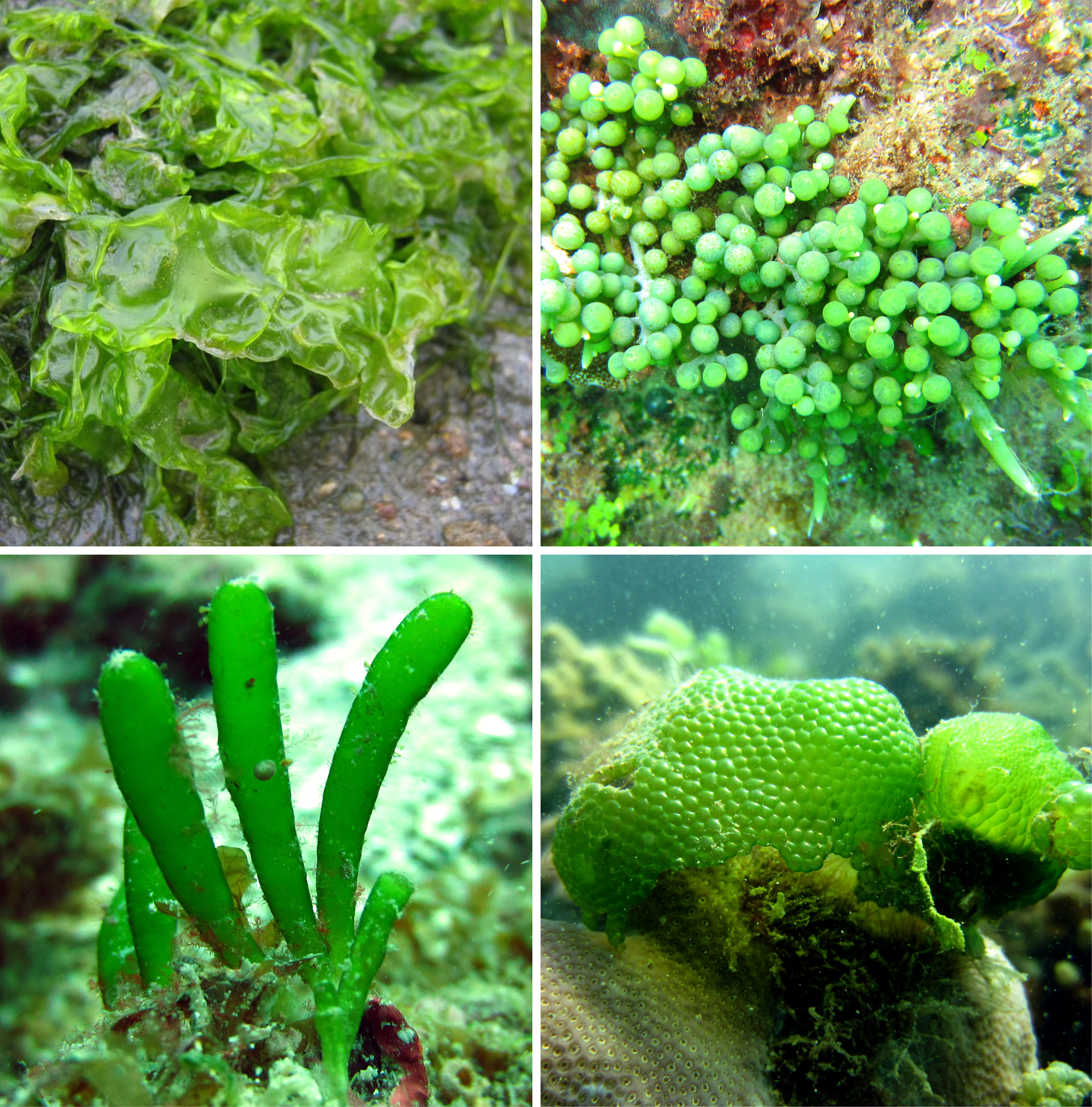
Composite image illustrating the diversity of Ulvophyceae. Top left: Ulva. Top right: Caulerpa. Bottom left: Bornetella. Bottom right: Dictyosphaeria.

The Ulvophyceae or ulvophytes are a class of green algae, distinguished mainly on the basis of ultrastructural morphology, life cycle and molecular phylogenetic data. The ulvophytes are diverse in their morphology and their habitat. Most are seaweeds, although a select few live in fresh water.

This list of Ulvophyceae genera is sub-divided by order and family. Some genera have uncertain taxonomic placement and are listed as incertae sedis. The list is based on the data available in AlgaeBase, the Integrated Taxonomic Information System (ITIS), the National Center for Biotechnology Information taxonomic database (NCBI), and other taxonomic databases.

== Order Acrosiphoniales ==
- Family Acrosiphoniaceae
  - Acrosiphonia
  - Codiolum
  - Spongomorpha

== Order Bryopsidales ==
- Family † Anchicodiaceae
  - † Anchicodium
  - † Calcipatera
  - † Eugonophyllum
  - † Iranicodium
  - † Ivanovia
  - † Neoanchicodium
  - † Paradella
- Family † Alternasaceae
  - † Aternasus
- Family Bryopsidaceae
  - Bryopsidella
  - Bryopsis
  - † Jaffrezocodium
  - Lambia
  - Pseudoderbesia
  - Trichosolen
- Family Caulerpaceae
  - Caulerpa
  - † Hasticula
  - † Lanciculella
  - † Lepidolancicula
  - † Quasilancicula
- Family Chaetosiphonaceae
  - Chaetosiphon
- Family Codiaceae
  - † Alpinium
  - † Aphroditicodium
  - † Appeninocodium
  - † Arabicodium
  - † Atlasinium
  - † Bacilloporella
  - † Bacinellacodium
  - † Bucurium
  - † Canadiophycus
  - † Carpathocodium
  - Codium
  - † Diversoporella
  - † Egericodium
  - Geppella
  - † Globosiphonia
  - † Johnsonicodium
  - † Lanciculina
  - † Malakhovella
  - Moniliaxes
  - † Nansenella
  - † Palaeoporella
  - † Praelitanaia
  - † Protocodium
  - † Radoicicinellopsis
  - † Schirschovaea
  - † Scotlandella
  - † Shonabellia
  - † Sinuatoporella
  - † Succodium
  - † Tethysicodium
  - † Thaiporella
  - † Vitinellopsis
  - † Vitivisus
- Family Derbesiaceae
  - Derbesia
  - Halicystis
  - Pedobesia
- Family Dichotomosiphonaceae
  - Avrainvillea
  - † Avrainvilleopsis
  - Cladocephalus
  - Dichotomosiphon
  - † Jabrianella
  - † Niteckiella
  - † Perachoraella
- Family Halimedaceae
  - Halimeda
- Family Ostreobiaceae
  - Ostreobium
- Family Pseudobryopsidaceae
  - Pseudobryopsis
- Family Pseudocodiaceae
  - Pseudocodium
- Family Pseudoudoteaceae
  - Hydraea
  - Pseudoudotea
- Family Rhipiliaceae
  - Rhipilia
  - Rhipiliopsis
  - Siphonoclathrus
- Family Udoteaceae
  - Boodleopsis
  - Botryodesmis
  - Callipsygma
  - Chlorodesmis
  - Chloroplegma
  - Coralliodendron
  - Flabellia
  - Penicillus
  - Poropsis
  - Pseudochlorodesmis
  - Pseudopenicillus
  - Rhipidosiphon
  - Rhipiliella
  - Rhipocephalus
  - Siphonogramen
  - Tydemania
  - Udotea

== Order Chlorocystidales ==
- Family Chlorocystidaceae
  - Chlorocystis
  - Desmochloris

== Order Cladophorales ==
- Family Anadyomenaceae
  - Anadyomene
  - Microdictyon
- Family Boodleaceae
  - Boodlea
  - Cladophoropsis
  - Nereodictyon
  - Phyllodictyon
  - Struvea
  - Struveopsis
- Family Cladophoraceae
  - Bryobesia
  - Chaetomorpha
  - Cladophora
  - Lurbica
  - Lychaete
  - Pseudorhizoclonium
  - Rhizoclonium
  - Spongiochrysis
  - Willeella
- Family Okellyaceae
  - Okellya
- Family Pithophoraceae
  - Aegagropila
  - Aegagropilopsis
  - Arnoldiella
  - Basicladia
  - Chaetocladiella
  - Chaetonella
  - Cladogonium
  - Cladostroma
  - Dermatophyton
  - Gemmiphora
  - Pithophora
  - Wittrockiella
- Family Pseudocladophoraceae
  - Pseudocladophora
- Family Siphonocladaceae
  - Apjohnia
  - Boergesenia
  - Chamaedoris
  - Dictyosphaeria
  - Ernodesmis
  - Siphonocladus
- Family Valoniaceae
  - Petrosiphon
  - Valonia
  - Valoniopsis

== Order Dasycladales ==
- Family Dasycladaceae
  - †Acicularia
  - †Acroporella
  - Amicus
  - Anatolipora
  - Andrusoporella
  - Anfractuosoporella
  - †Anisoporella
  - †Anthracoporella
  - †Archaeocladus
  - †Atractyliopsis
  - Batophora
  - †Beresella
  - Bornetella
  - †Chinianella
  - Chloroclados
  - †Clavapora
  - †Clavaporella
  - Connexia
  - Cylindroporella
  - Cymopolia
  - Dasycladus
  - Dissocladella
  - †Dvinella
  - †Endoina
  - †Eoclypeina
  - Eogoniolina
  - †Eovelebitella
  - †Epimastopora
  - †Euteutloporella
  - †Favoporella
  - †Fourcadella
  - †Genotella
  - †Goniolinopsis
  - †Gyroporella
  - Halicoryne
  - Holosporella
  - †Imperiella
  - †Kantia
  - †Kochanskyella
  - †Lacrymorphus
  - †Macroporella
  - †Mizzia
  - †Munieria
  - †Nanjinoporella
  - Neomeris
  - †Oligoporella
  - †Ollaria
  - †Pentaporella
  - †Permopora
  - †Placklesia
  - †Salpingoporella
  - †Teutloporella
  - †Thailandoporella
  - †Uragiella
  - †Uragiellopsis
  - †Uraloporella
  - †Velomorpha
  - †Vermiporella
  - †Xainzanella
  - †Zaporella
- Family Polyphysaceae
  - Acetabularia
  - Chalmasia
  - Clypeina
  - Ioanella
  - Parvocaulis
  - Pseudoclypeina
- Family Triploporellaceae
  - Chaetocladus
  - Deloffrella
  - Draconisella
  - Eocladus
  - Palaeocymopolia
  - Triploporella

== Order Ignatiales ==
- Family Ignatiaceae
  - Ignatius
  - Pseudocharacium

== Order Oltmannsiellopsidales ==
- Family Oltmannsiellopsidaceae
  - Halochlorococcum
  - Neodangemannia
  - Oltmannsiellopsis

== Order Scotinosphaerales ==
- Family Scotinosphaeraceae
  - Kentrosphaera
  - Scotinosphaera

== Order Sykidiales ==
- Family Sykidiacaeae
  - Sykidion

== Order Trentepohliales ==
- Family Trentepohliaceae
  - Cephaleuros
  - Friedaea
  - Lochmium
  - Phycopeltis
  - Physolinum
  - Printzina
  - Rhizothallus
  - Sporocladus
  - Stomatochroon
  - Trentepohlia

== Order Ulotrichales ==
- Family Binucleariaceae
  - Binuclearia
- Family Collinsiellaceae
  - Collinsiellopsis
- Family Gayraliaceae
  - Gayralia
- Family Gloeotilaceae
  - Coccothrix
- Family Gomontiaceae
  - Chlorojackia
  - Collinsiella
  - Eugomontia
  - Gomontia
- Family Hazeniaceae
  - Chamaetrichon
  - Hazenia
- Family Helicodictyaceae
  - Protoderma
  - Rhexinema
- Family Kraftionemaceae
  - Kraftionema
- Family Monostromataceae
  - Monostroma
- Family Planophilaceae
  - Chloroplana
  - Fernandinella
  - Planophila
  - Pseudendocloniopsis
  - Tetraciella
- Family Sarcinofilaceae
  - Filoprotococcus
  - Sarcinofilum
- Family Tupiellaceae
  - Tupiella
  - Vischerioclonium
- Family Ulotrichaceae
  - Capsosiphon
  - Chlorhormidium
  - Chlorocystis
  - Chlorothrix
  - Dendronema
  - Didymothrix
  - Fottea
  - Geminellopsis
  - Gloeotilopsis
  - Gyoerffyella
  - Heterothrichopsis
  - Hormidiopsis
  - Hormidiospora
  - Hormococcus
  - Ingenhouzella
  - Interfilum
  - Microsporopsis
  - Pearsoniella
  - Protomonostroma
  - Psephonema
  - Psephotaxus
  - Pseudoschizomeris
  - Pseudothrix
  - Ulothrix
  - Ulotrichopsis
  - Urospora
- Incertae sedis
  - Trichosarcina

== Order Ulvales ==
- Family Bolbocoleonaceae
  - Bolbocoleon
- Family Cloniophoraceae
  - Cloniophora
- Family Ctenocladaceae
  - Ctenocladus
  - Pseudopleurococcus
  - Spongioplastidium
- Family Kornmanniaceae
  - Blidingia
  - Dilabifilum
  - Kornmannia
  - Lithotrichon
  - Neostromatella
  - Pseudendoclonium
  - Tellamia
- Family Phaeophilaceae
  - Phaeophila
- Family Ulvaceae
  - Enteronia
  - Gemina
  - Letterstedtia
  - Lobata
  - Ochlochaete
  - Percursaria
  - Ruthnielsenia
  - Solenia
  - Ulva
  - Ulvaria
  - Umbraulva
- Family Ulvellaceae
  - Acrochaete
  - Endoderma
  - Entocladia
  - Entoderma
  - Epicladia
  - Pringsheimiella
  - Pseudopringsheimia
  - Pseudoneochloris
  - Syncoryne
  - Trichothyra
  - Ulvella
- Incertae sedis
  - Halofilum
  - Paulbroadya

== Incertae sedis ==
- Blastophysa
- Trichophilus
