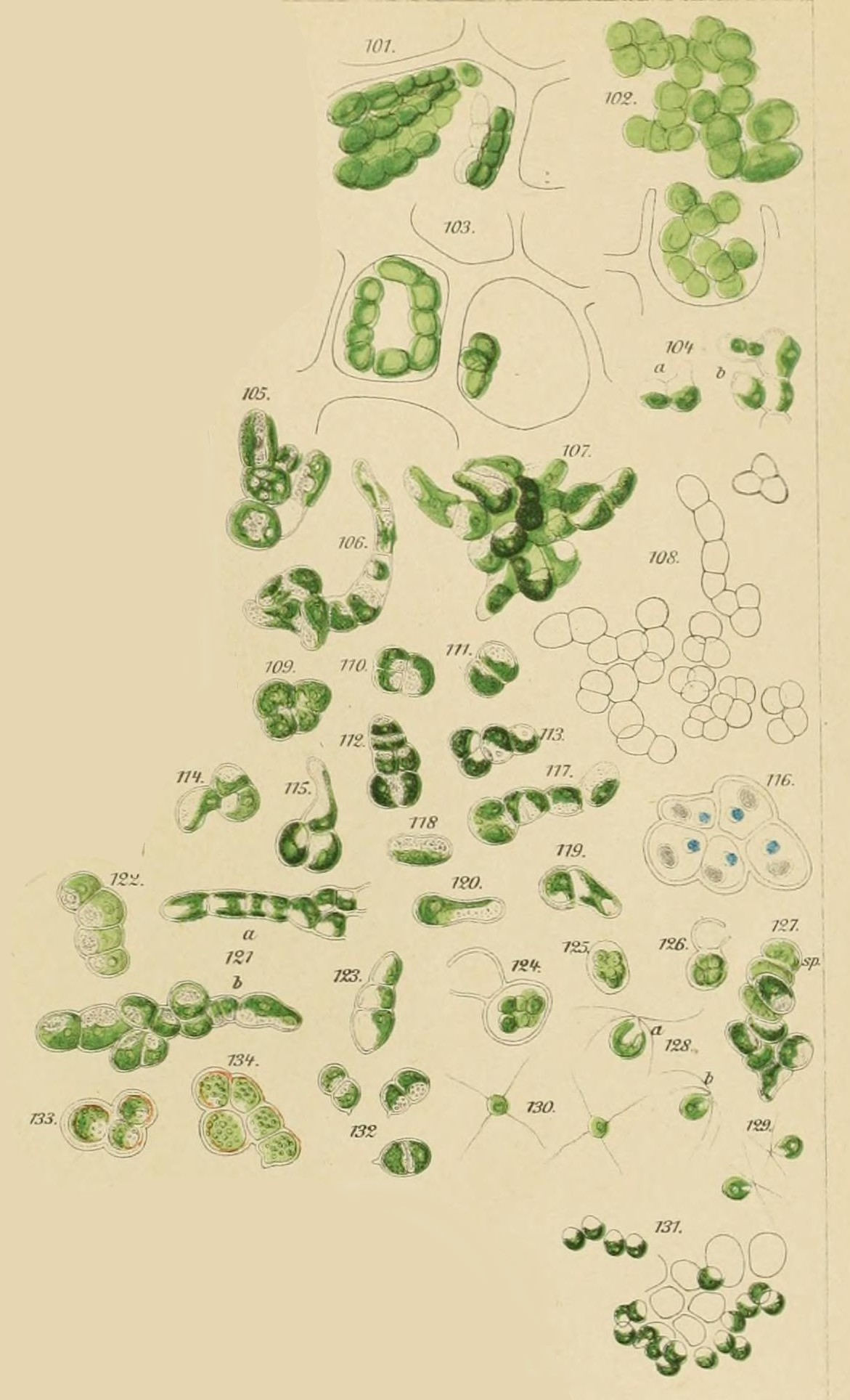
- Pseudendoclonium submarinum

Scientific classification
- Kingdom: Plantae
- Division: Chlorophyta
- Class: Ulvophyceae
- Order: Ulvales
- Family: Kornmanniaceae
- Genus: Pseudendoclonium; Wille, 1901

Type species
- Pseudendoclonium submarinum

Species
- Pseudendoclonium arthopyreniae (Vischer & Klement) Darienko & Pröschold; Pseudendoclonium commune Darienko & Pröschold; Pseudendoclonium dynamenae R.Nielsen; Pseudendoclonium fucicola (Rosenvinge) R.Nielsen; Pseudendoclonium incrustans (Vischer) Darienko & Pröschold; Pseudendoclonium informe P.J.L.Dangeard; Pseudendoclonium laxum D.M.John & L.R.Johnson; Pseudendoclonium marinum (Reinke) Aleem & E.Schulz; Pseudendoclonium spinulosum Wydrzycka; Pseudendoclonium submarinum Wille

= Pseudendoclonium =

Genus of algae

Pseudendoclonium is a genus of green algae, in the family Kornmanniaceae. Pseudendoclonium is found in a wide range of habitats, including marine, freshwater, terrestrial and aerophytic habitats.

The thalli of Pseudendoclonium consist of prostrate and erect filaments. When young, the filaments are uniseriate (one cell wide) cells are cylindrical and contain a single parietal, plate-like chloroplast usually with a pyrenoid. Filaments are irregularly branched, with branches forming at the apices of cells. Filaments eventually become biseriate or irregular masses of cells. Pseudendoclonium reproduces asexually via biflagellate or quadriflagellate zoospores, aplanospores or akinetes.

Molecular phylogenetic studies have shown Pseudendoclonium as traditionally circumscribed to be polyphyletic. Species unrelated to the type species P. submarinum have been transferred to the genera Hazenia, Rhexinema, and Tupiella. In addition, the genus Dilabifilum is considered synonymous with Pseudendoclonium.
