= Dangemannia =

Scientific classification
- Clade: Viridiplantae
- Division: Chlorophyta
- Class: Ulvophyceae
- Order: Oltmannsiellopsidales
- Family: Oltmannsiellopsidaceae
- Genus: Dangemannia; Friedl & O'Kelly

Species
- Dangemannia microcystis

Genus of algae

Dangemannia is a genus of green algae in the family Oltmannsiellopsidaceae.

The genus name of Dangemannia is in honour of Pierre Jean Louis Dangeard (1895–1970), who was a French botanist and Peter Kornmann (1907–1993), a German botanist.

The genus was circumscribed by Thomas Friedl and Charles J. O'Kelly in Eur. J. Phycol. Vol.37 on page 382 in 2002.
