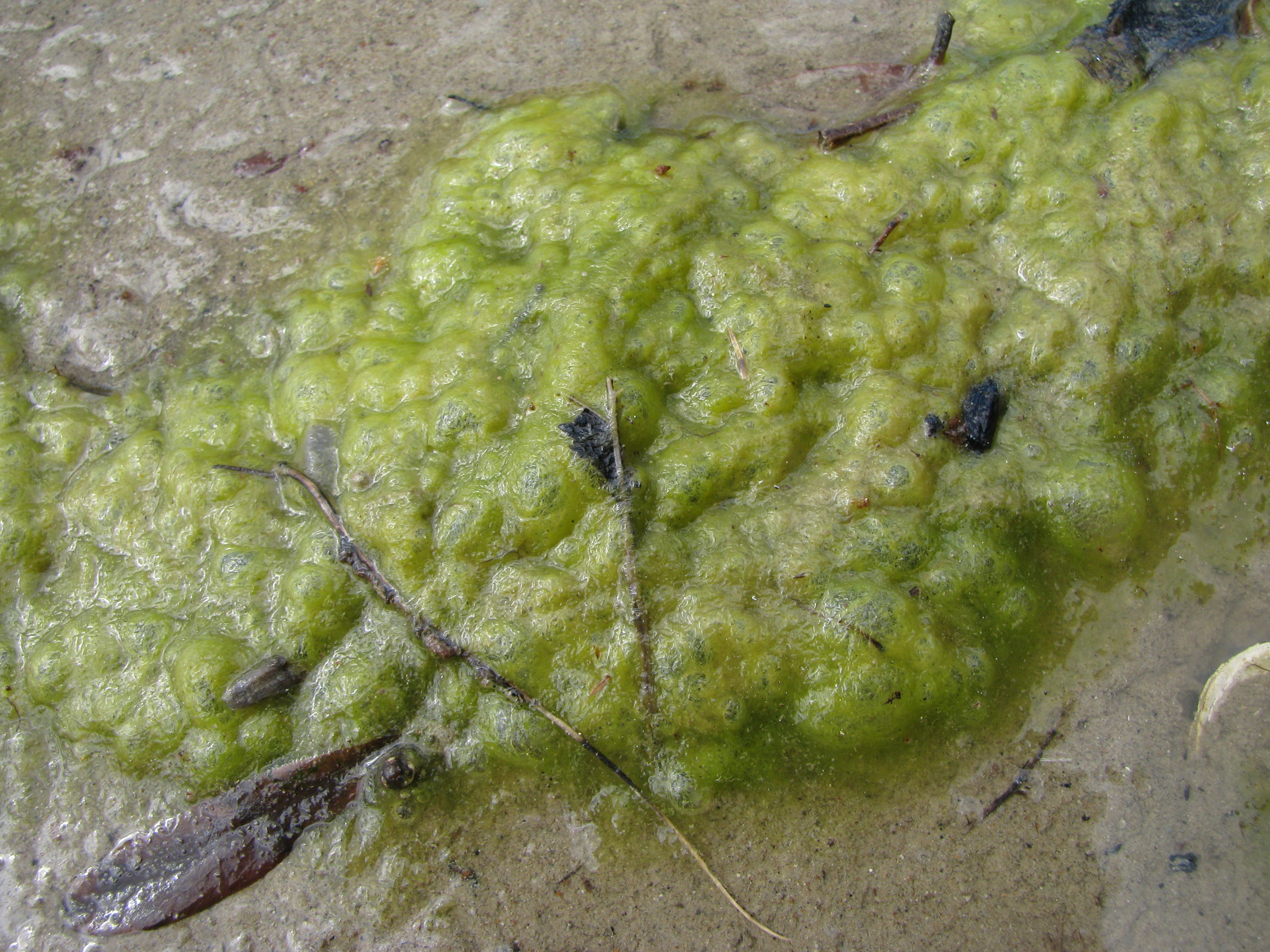

Scientific classification
- Clade: Viridiplantae
- Division: Chlorophyta
- Class: Ulvophyceae
- Order: Ulvales
- Family: Ulvaceae
- Genus: Percursaria
- Species: P. percursa

Binomial name
- Percursaria percursa (C. Agardh) Rosenvinge

Synonyms
- Enteromorpha percursa (C. Agardh) Greville

= Percursaria percursa =

Species of alga

Percursaria percursa is a species of seaweed from the family Ulvaceae. The species type locality is Denmark. Its floating masses of unbranched filaments are several centimeters in length, 24–32 micrometres (0.00094–0.00126 in) broad and 14–18 micrometres (0.00055–0.00071 in) thick.
