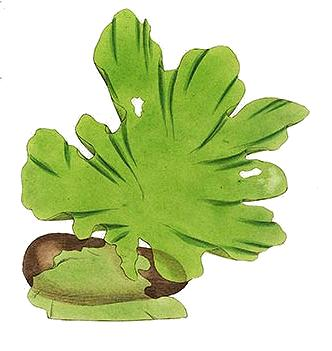

Scientific classification
- Kingdom: Plantae
- Division: Chlorophyta
- Class: Ulvophyceae
- Order: Ulvales
- Family: Ulvaceae
- Genus: Ulvaria
- Species: U. obscura

Binomial name
- Ulvaria obscura (Kützing) Gayral ex Bliding

= Ulvaria obscura =

Species of alga

Ulvaria obscura is an intertidal and subtidal benthic marine algae found in temperate and Arctic ocean waters around the world.

== Ecology ==
Ulvaria obscura is a common marine algae, typically identified in algal blooms referred to as "Green Tides". The species is distinct in its ability to produce the neurotransmitter dopamine as a herbivore defense mechanism. The species has a wide tolerance to various growth conditions, surviving temperatures between 5-29 °C, salinities from freshwater to complete saturation, and grows well under various light intensities. The species growth rate responds to increased dissolved inorganic nitrogen availability, making the species a possible indicator of anthropogenic pollution leading to eutrophication.

== Identification ==
The thalli of Ulvaria obscura are bladelike, usually less than 5 cm tall and 8 cm thick, consisting of a single cell layer, and typically have between 2 and 6 pyrenoids per cell. Thalli turn from green to dark brown upon desiccation due to the oxidation of dopamine within the tissues.
