= Chaetosiphon =

Chaetosiphon may refer to:

- Chaetosiphon (alga), an alga genus of the family Chaetosiphonaceae
- Chaetosiphon (aphid), an insect genus of the family Aphididae
