= Scotinosphaera facciolae =

Scientific classification
- Clade: Viridiplantae
- Division: Chlorophyta
- Class: Ulvophyceae
- Order: Scotinosphaerales
- Family: Scotinosphaeraceae
- Genus: Scotinosphaera
- Species: S. facciolae

Binomial name
- Scotinosphaera facciolae

Species of alga

Scotinosphaera facciolae is a species of algae belonging to the family Scotinosphaeraceae.

The species inhabits freshwater environments.
