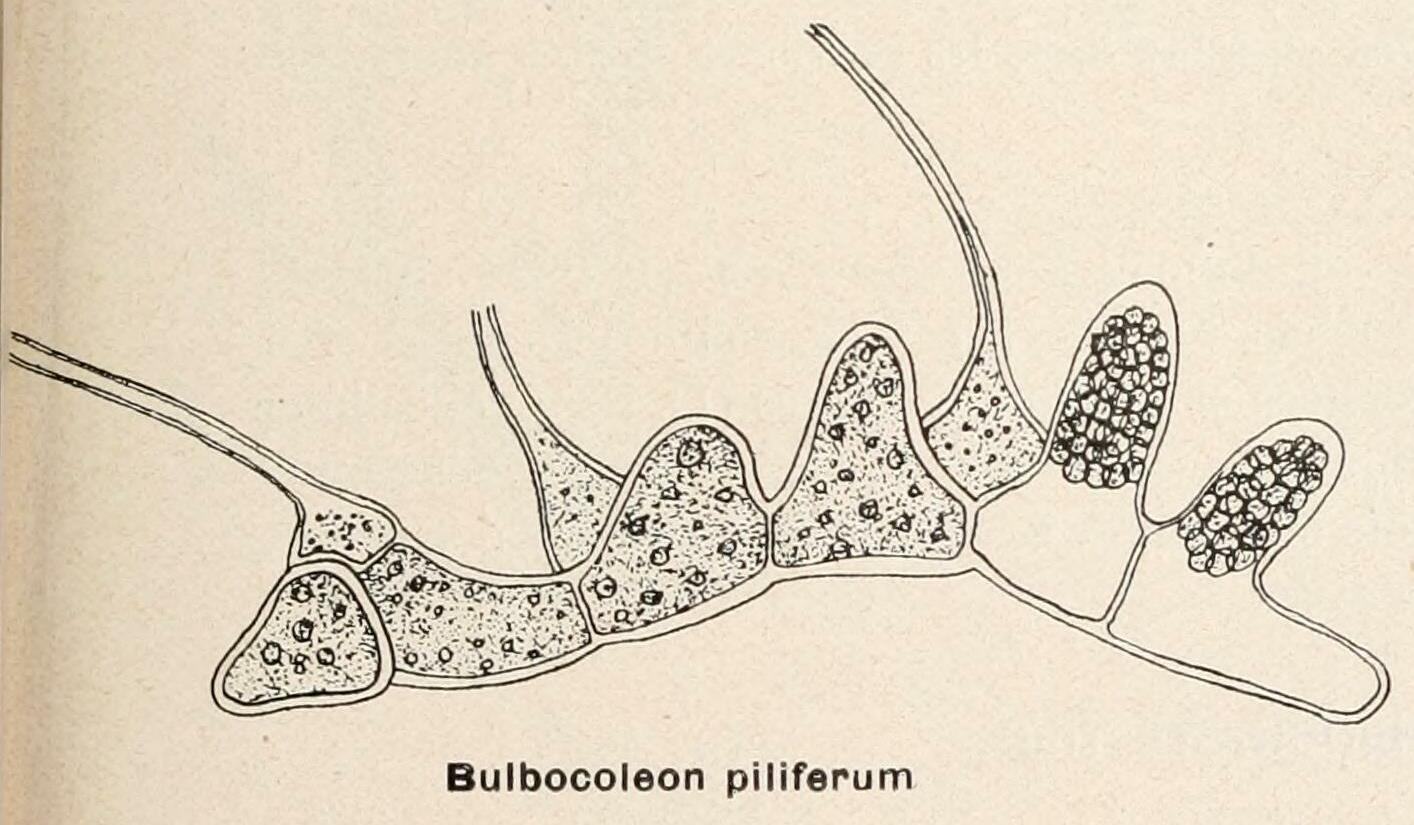
- Bolbocoleon piliferum

Scientific classification
- Clade: Viridiplantae
- Division: Chlorophyta
- Class: Ulvophyceae
- Order: Ulvales
- Family: Bolbocoleonaceae; C.J.O'Kelly & B.Rinkel
- Genus: Bolbocoleon; Pringsheim, 1863

Type species
- Bolbocoleon piliferum

Species
- Bolbocoleon jolyi; Bolbocoleon piliferum

= Bolbocoleon =

Genus of algae

Bolbocoleon is a genus of green algae, in the family Bolbocoleonaceae.
