= Trichosarcina =

Scientific classification
- Clade: Viridiplantae
- Division: Chlorophyta
- Class: Ulvophyceae
- Order: Ulotrichales
- Family: incertae sedis
- Genus: Trichosarcina; H.W.Nichols & Bold, 1965, nom. inval.
- Species: T. polymorpha

Binomial name
- Trichosarcina polymorpha H.W.Nichols & Bold

Genus of algae

Trichosarcina is a genus of green algae in the order Ulotrichales. Filoprotococcus was once regarded as a synonym. However, Filoprotococcus is now considered valid in its own right. Trichosarcina is considered to be of uncertain validity.

As of February 2022, AlgaeBase accepted only one species, Trichosarcina polymorpha. Its life cycle includes a uniseriate, Hormidium-like phase; a pluriseriate stage, and, finally, a chain of sarcinoid packets which may dissociate. The cells are uninucleate, with a parietal chloroplast and single pyrenoid. Quadriflagellate zoospores are produced by cells of the pluriseriate and sarcinoid stages.
