= Ignatiaceae =

Scientific classification
- Kingdom: Plantae
- Division: Chlorophyta
- Class: Ulvophyceae
- Order: Ignatiales
- Family: Ignatiaceae; Leliaert & Škaloud

Genera
- Ignatius Bold & F.J.MacEntee – 1 species; Pseudocharacium Korshikov – 3 species

Order of algae

Ignatiaceae is a family of green algae in the class Ulvophyceae.

Ignatiaceae contains two genera, Ignatius and Pseudocharacium. The former consists of single cells which undergo vegetative division to form irregular clusters of cells. The latter consists of single cells attached to a substrate.

Reproduction in the Ignatiaceae is asexual; sexual reproduction has not been observed. Asexual reproduction involves quadriflagellate zoospores. The basal bodies of the flagella have a unique orientation, where two upper basal bodies are oriented counterclockwise, and two lower basal bodies are directly opposed or oriented slightly clockwise.
