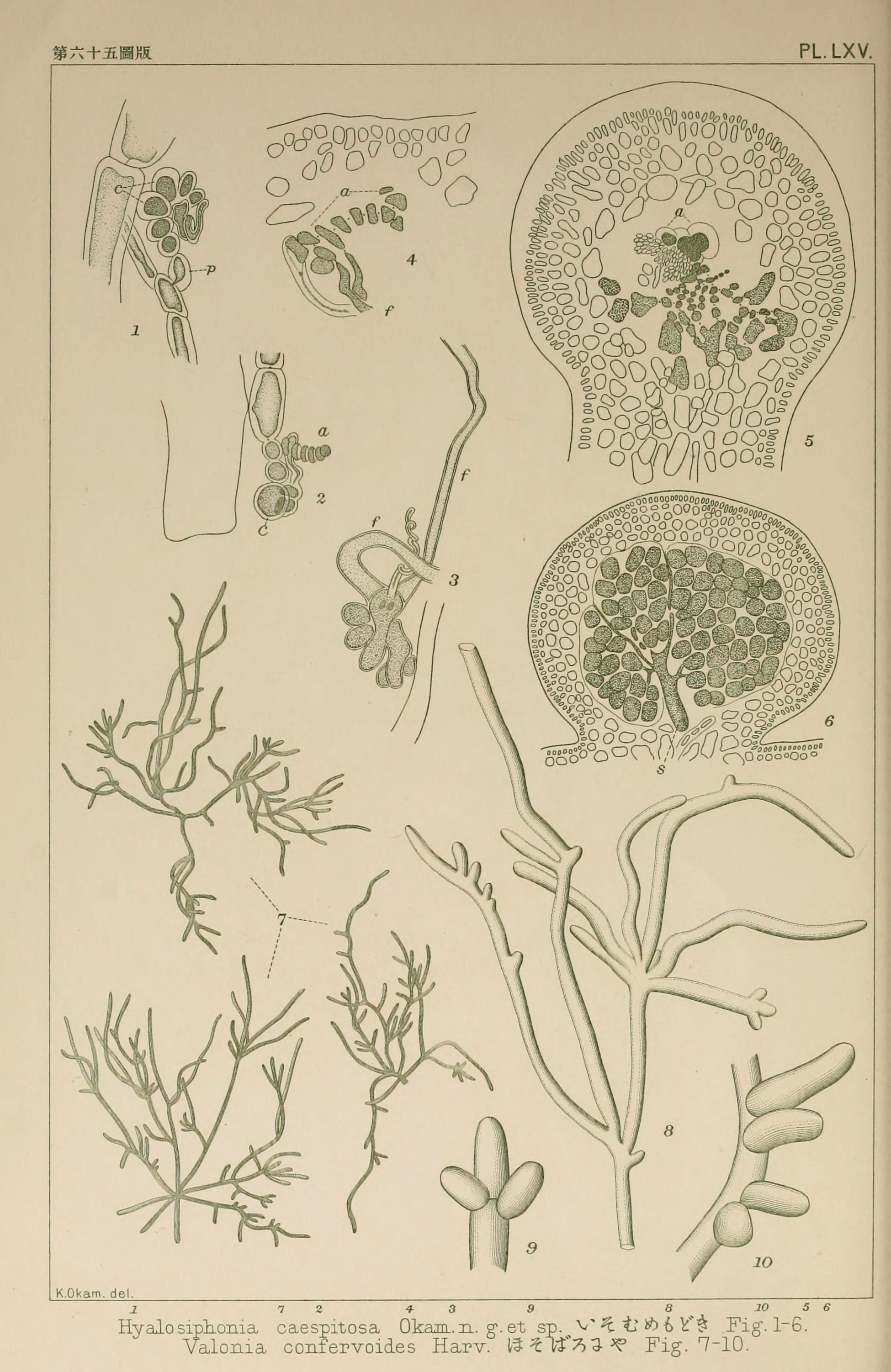
- Valoniopsis pachynema (fig. 7-10)

Scientific classification
- Kingdom: Plantae
- Division: Chlorophyta
- Class: Ulvophyceae
- Order: Cladophorales
- Family: Valoniaceae
- Genus: Valoniopsis; Børgesen

Species
- Valoniopsis pachynema

= Valoniopsis =

Genus of algae

Valoniopsis is a genus of green algae in the family Valoniaceae.
