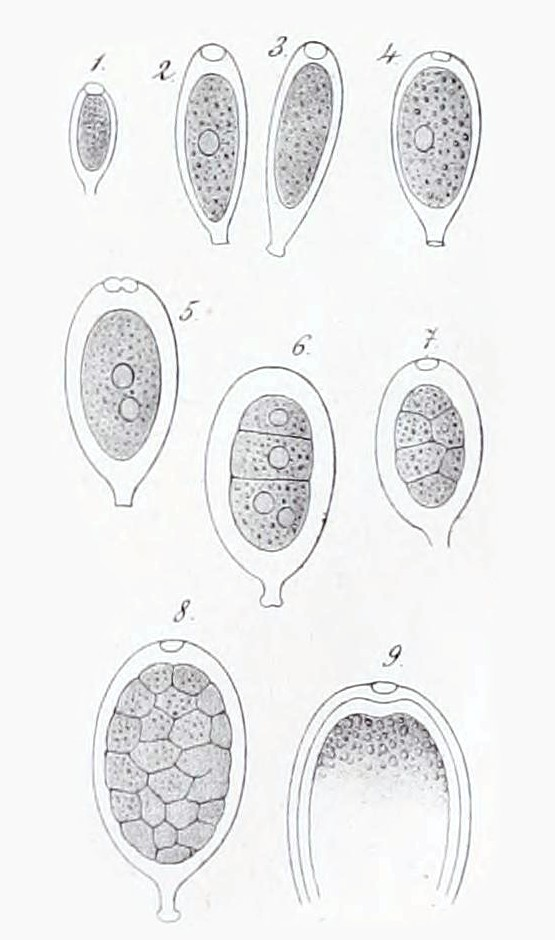
- Pseudocharacium, a genus in the family Ignatiaceae

Scientific classification
- Kingdom: Plantae
- Division: Chlorophyta
- Class: Ulvophyceae
- Order: Ignatiales; Leliaert & Škaloud

Families
- Ignatiaceae; Symbiochloraceae

= Ignatiales =

Order of algae

Ignatiales is an order of green algae in the class Ulvophyceae. The order was described in 2018 based on molecular phylogenetic studies.

Members of the Ignatiales are mostly occur as single cells or clusters of two to eight cells. They are found in terrestrial, freshwater and marine habitats.
