= Ctenocladaceae =

Scientific classification
- Kingdom: Plantae
- Division: Chlorophyta
- Class: Ulvophyceae
- Order: Ulvales
- Family: Ctenocladaceae; Borzi

Genera
- Ctenocladus; Pseudopleurococcus; Rindifilum; Spongioplastidium

Family of algae

Ctenocladaceae is a family of green algae in the order Ulvales.

Members of the Ctenocladaceae are filamentous, consisting of branched filaments, or forming pseudoparenchymatous masses of rounded cells. Cells contain a single chloroplast which is parietal or spongiose, with one to several pyrenoids. Asexual reproduction is primarily by the formation of akinetes.
