= Lobata (alga) =

Scientific classification
- Clade: Viridiplantae
- Division: Chlorophyta
- Class: Ulvophyceae
- Order: Ulvales
- Family: Ulvaceae
- Genus: Lobata; V.J. Chapman, 1952

Genus of algae

Lobata is a genus of green alga.
