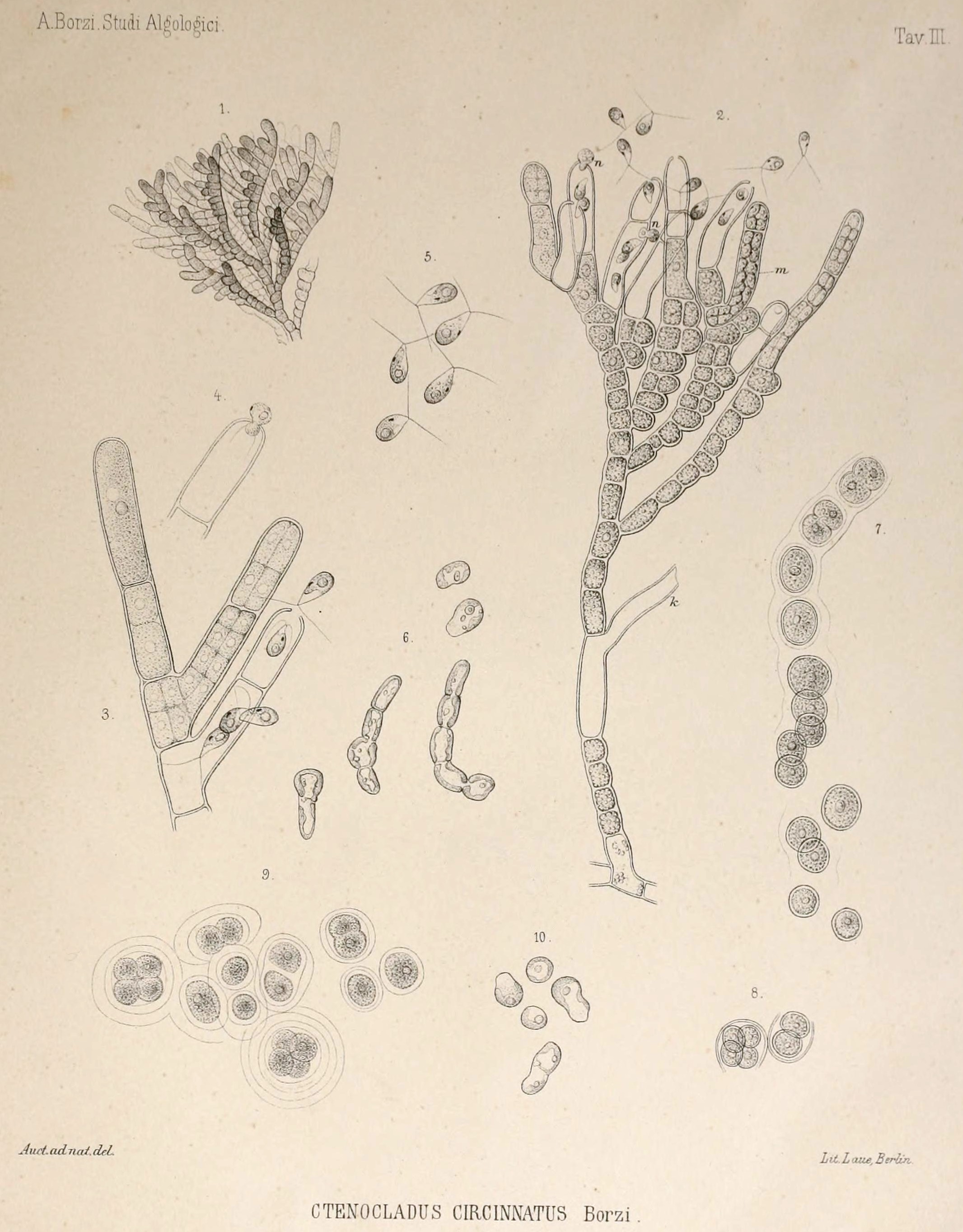
- Ctenocladus circinnatus

Scientific classification
- Kingdom: Plantae
- Division: Chlorophyta
- Class: Ulvophyceae
- Order: Ulvales
- Family: Ctenocladaceae
- Genus: Ctenocladus; A. Borzì, 1883

Type species
- Ctenocladus circinnatus

Species
- Ctenocladus circinnatus

= Ctenocladus =

Genus of algae

Ctenocladus is a genus of green algae in the order Ulvales. It is a rare genus which occurs mainly in inland saline environments, such as salt lakes. Most records of the genus are from North America, with a few from Peru, Sicily, and Siberia. It has also been recorded from stuccos of archaeological sites in Spain.

Ctenocladus grows attached to rocks and plants, mainly Salicornia, at the margins of bodies of water. It forms gelatinous, globular masses of erect, radiating filaments. The filaments are uniseriate, with lateral branches. Cells are cylindrical, uninucleate, each containing a single parietal chloroplast with one to several pyrenoids.

Ctenocladus reproduces both asexually and sexually. Asexual reproduction is via zoospores, which are biflagellate or quadriflagellate in one species. Sexual reproduction is isogamous, with biflagellate gametes. Ctenocladus is charactererized by forming rounded akinetes, singly or in series, at the ends of filaments.
