= Halochlorococcum =

Scientific classification
- Clade: Viridiplantae
- Division: Chlorophyta
- Class: Ulvophyceae
- Order: Oltmannsiellopsidales
- Family: Oltmannsiellopsidaceae
- Genus: Halochlorococcum; P.J.L.Dangeard ex Guiry

Species
- H. dilatatum; H. marinum; H. moorei; H. operculatum; H. porphyrae; H. saccatum; H. tenue

Genus of algae

Halochlorococcum is a genus of green algae, in the family Oltmannsiellopsidaceae.
