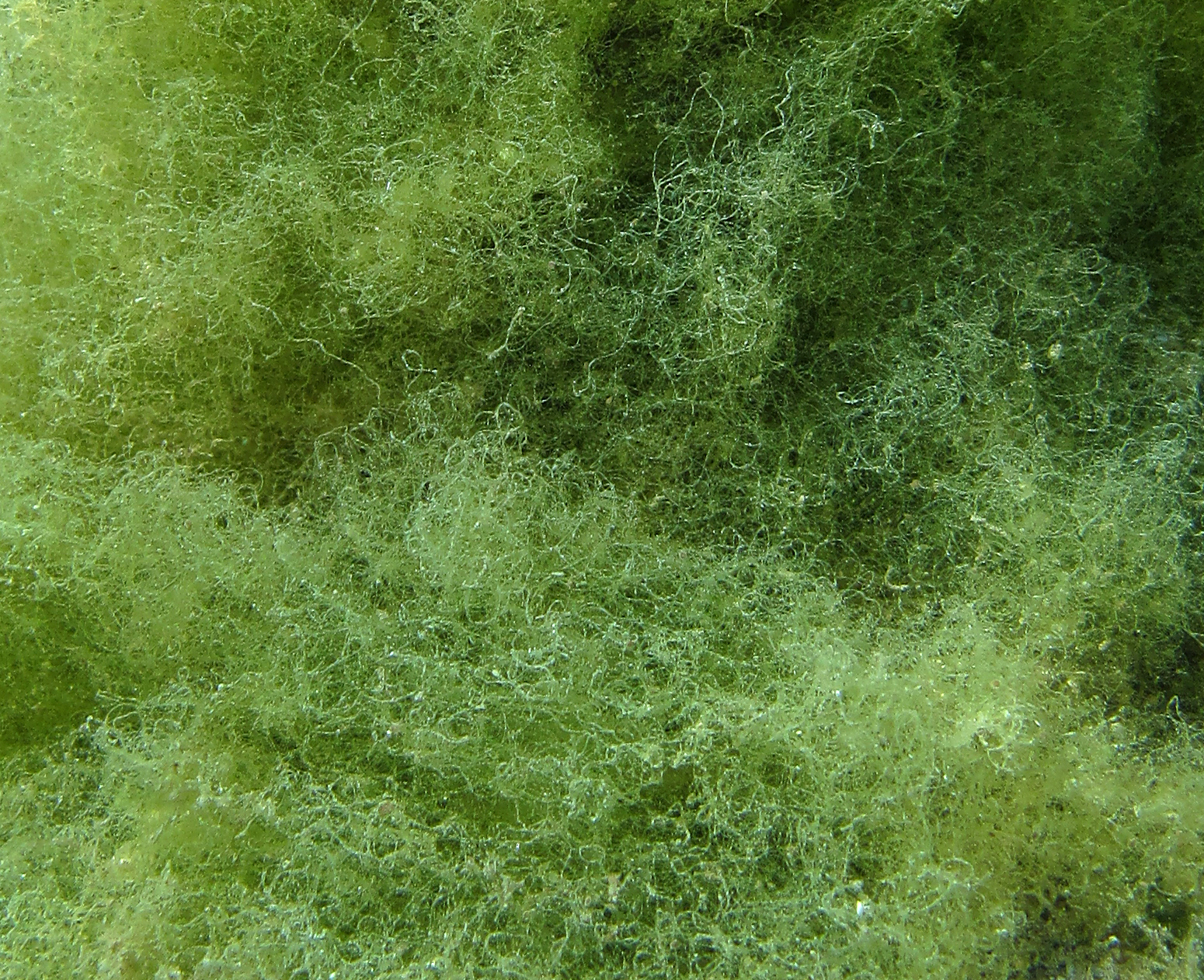
- Derbesia sp.

Scientific classification
- Kingdom: Plantae
- Division: Chlorophyta
- Class: Ulvophyceae
- Order: Bryopsidales
- Family: Derbesiaceae; Hauck, 1884

Genera
- Derbesia; Halicystis; Pedobesia; Pedodiscus

= Derbesiaceae =

Family of algae

Derbesiaceae are a family of green algae in the order Bryopsidales.
