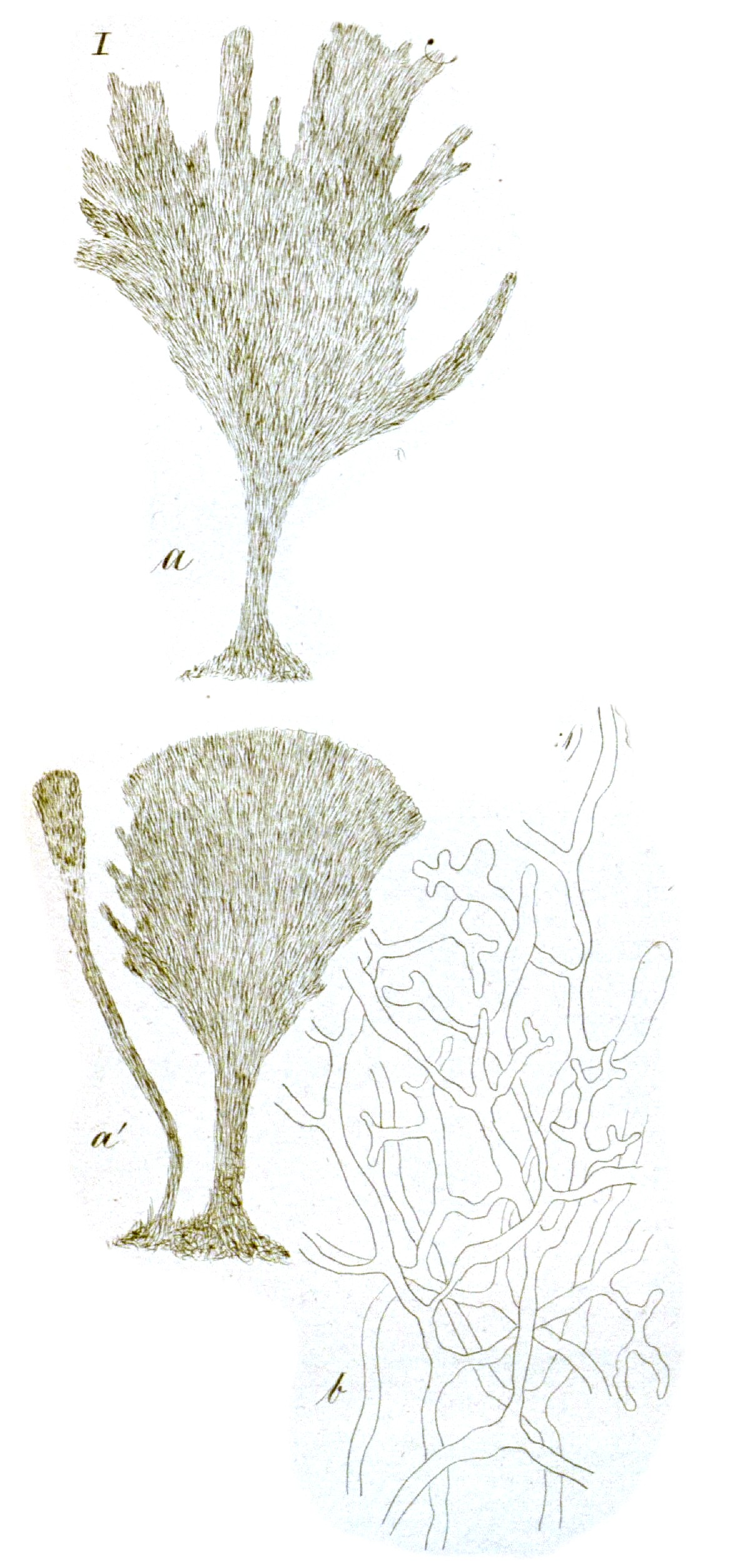
- Rhipilia tomentosa from Kützing (1858)

Scientific classification
- Clade: Viridiplantae
- Division: Chlorophyta
- Class: Ulvophyceae
- Order: Bryopsidales
- Family: Rhipiliaceae
- Genus: Rhipilia; Kützing, 1858

Type species
- Rhipilia tomentosa

Species
- Rhipilia baculifera; Rhipilia coppejansii; Rhipilia diaphana; Rhipilia fungiformis; Rhipilia geppii; Rhipilia micronesica; Rhipilia nigrescens; Rhipilia penicilloides; Rhipilia psammophila; Rhipilia pusilla; Rhipilia sinuosa; Rhipilia tomentosa

= Rhipilia =

Genus of algae

Rhipilia is a genus of green algae in the family Rhipiliaceae.

== Species ==
The following species are recognised:

- Rhipilia baculifera (J.Agardh) Huisman & Verbruggen
- Rhipilia coppejansii Schils & Verbruggen
- Rhipilia diaphana W.R.Taylor
- Rhipilia fungiformis A.B.Joly & Ugadim
- Rhipilia geppii W.R.Taylor
- Rhipilia geppiorum W.R.Taylor
- Rhipilia micronesica Yamada
- Rhipilia nigrescens Coppejans & Prud’homme
- Rhipilia penicilloides A.D.R.N'Yeurt & D.W.Keats
- Rhipilia psammophila Huisman & Verbruggen
- Rhipilia pusilla (Womersley) Ducker
- Rhipilia sinuosa Gilbert
- Rhipilia tomentosa Kützing
