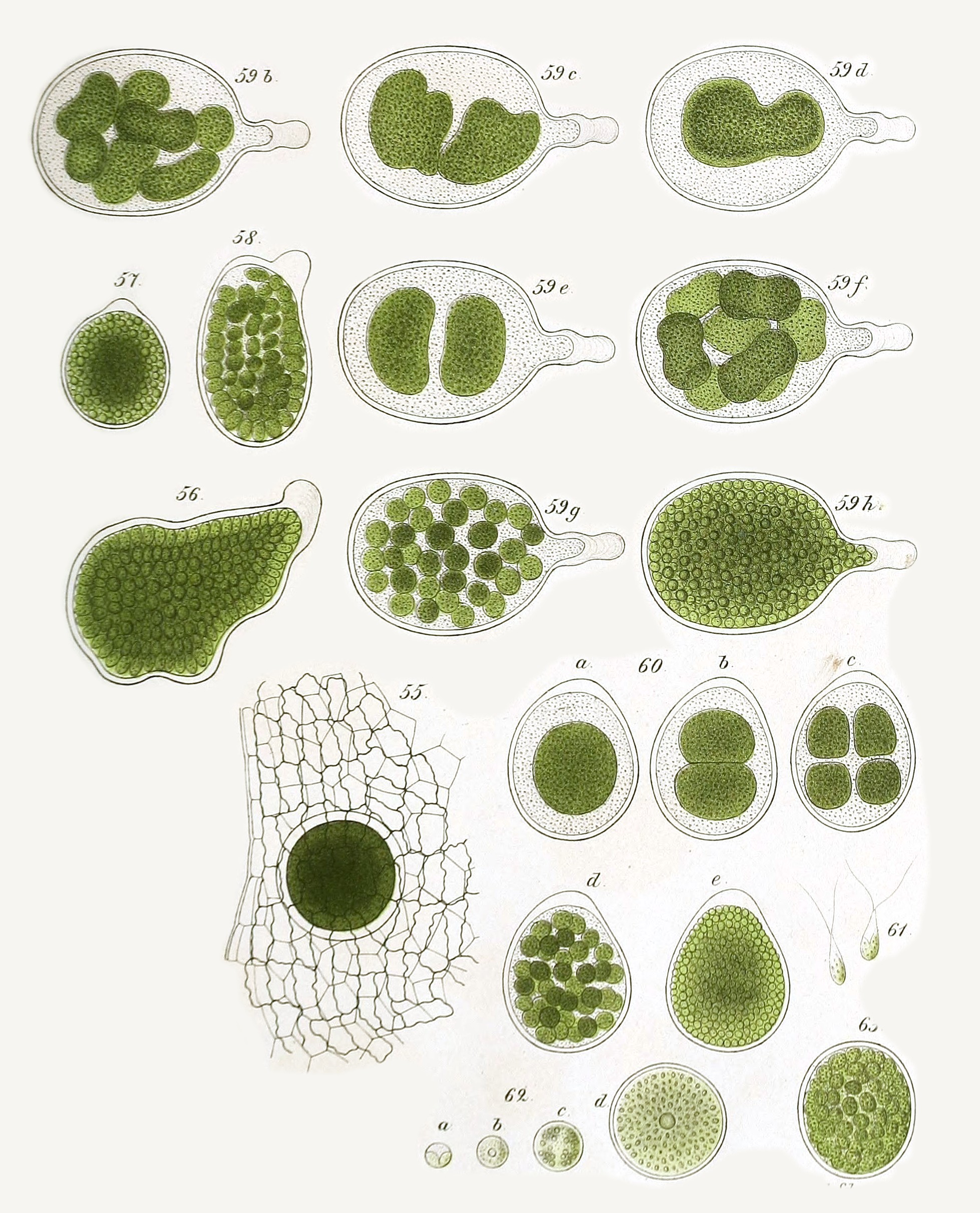
- Scotinosphaera paradoxa

Scientific classification
- Clade: Viridiplantae
- Division: Chlorophyta
- Class: Ulvophyceae
- Order: Scotinosphaerales
- Family: Scotinosphaeraceae
- Genus: Scotinosphaera; Klebs

= Scotinosphaera =

Genus of algae

Scotinosphaera is a genus of algae belonging to the family Scotinosphaeraceae.

The genus was first described by Klebs in 1881.

Synonym: Kentrosphaera Borzì, 1883

Species:

- Scotinosphaera facciolae
