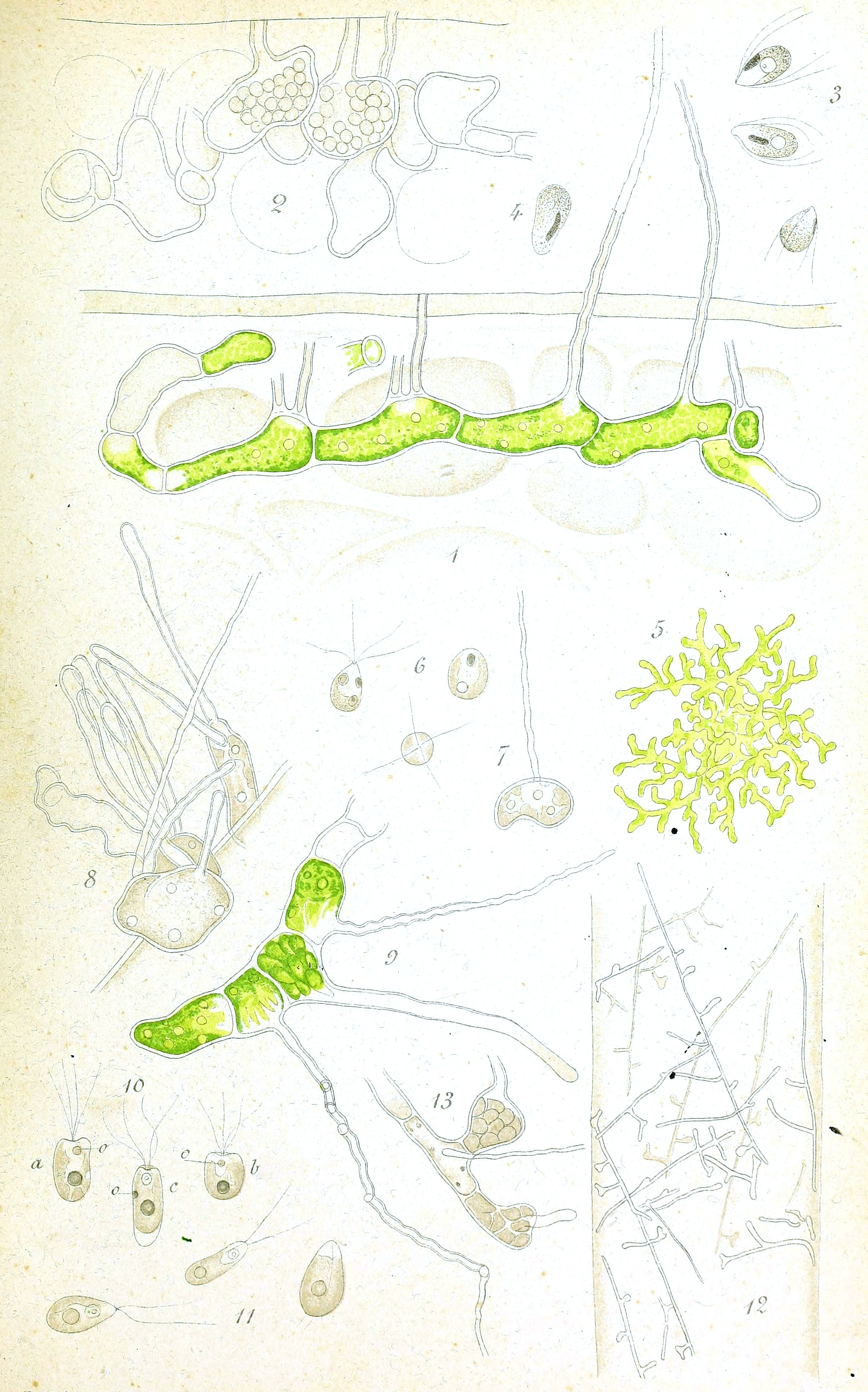
- Phaeophila dendroides

Scientific classification
- Kingdom: Plantae
- Division: Chlorophyta
- Class: Ulvophyceae
- Order: Ulvales
- Family: Phaeophilaceae; D.F.Chappell, C.J.O'Kelly, L.W.Wilcox, & G.L.Floyd

Genera
- Phaeophila

= Phaeophilaceae =

Family of algae

Phaeophilaceae are a family of green algae in the order Ulvales.
