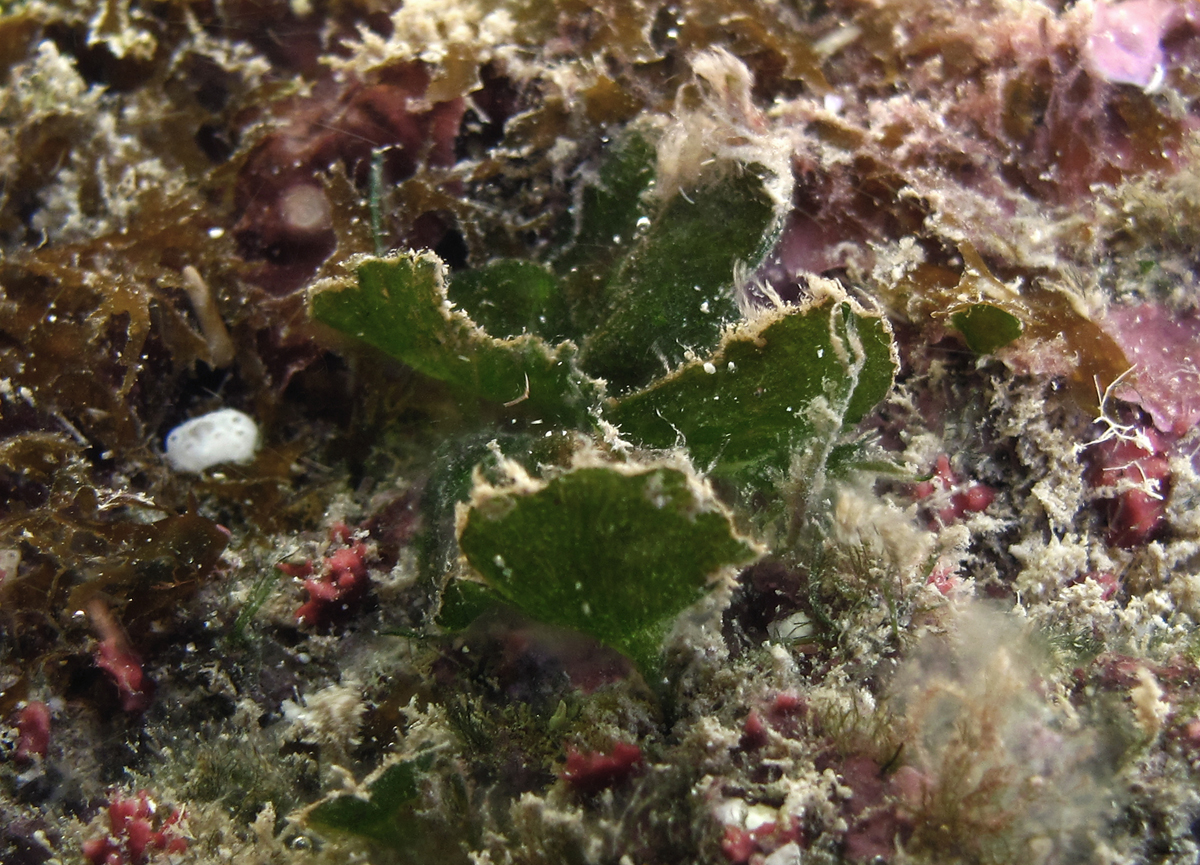
- Avrainvillea cf. amadelpha at Réunion

Scientific classification
- Kingdom: Plantae
- Division: Chlorophyta
- Class: Ulvophyceae
- Order: Bryopsidales
- Family: Dichotomosiphonaceae; Chadefaud ex G.M.Smith, 1950

Genera
- Avrainvillea; Cladocephalus; Dichotomosiphon

= Dichotomosiphonaceae =

Family of algae

Dichotomosiphonaceae are a family of green algae in the order Bryopsidales.
