= Filoprotococcus =

Scientific classification
- Kingdom: Plantae
- Division: Chlorophyta
- Class: Ulvophyceae
- Order: Ulotrichales
- Family: Sarcinofilaceae
- Genus: Filoprotococcus; Kufferath, 1914

Type species
- Filoprotococcus enteromorphoides Kufferath, 1914

Species
- Filoprotococcus enteromorphoides; Filoprotococcus polymorphus

Genus of algae

Filoprotococcus is a genus of green algae in the order Ulotrichales. It was once regarded as a synonym of Trichosarcina. However, it is now accepted as a genus in its own right, and Trichosarcina is considered taxonomically uncertain.
