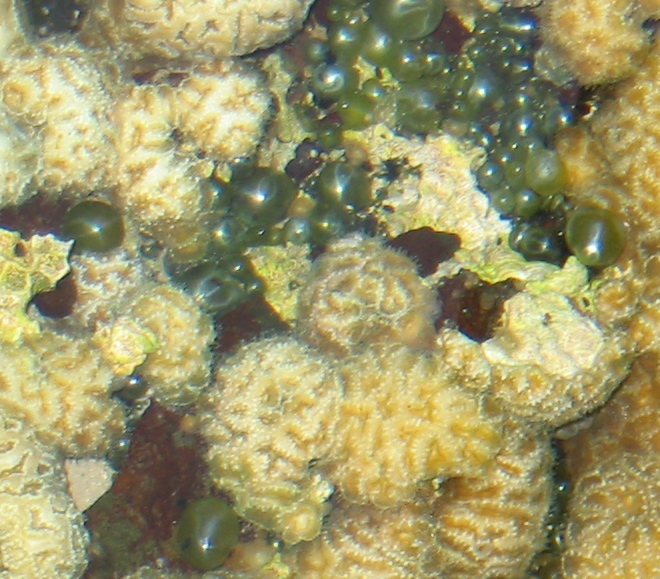

Scientific classification
- Domain: Eukaryota
- Clade: Archaeplastida
- Clade: Viridiplantae
- Division: Chlorophyta
- Class: Ulvophyceae
- Order: Cladophorales
- Family: Valoniaceae; Kützing

Genera
- Petrosiphon; Valonia; Valoniopsis

= Valoniaceae =

Family of algae

Valoniaceae is a family of green algae in the order Cladophorales.
