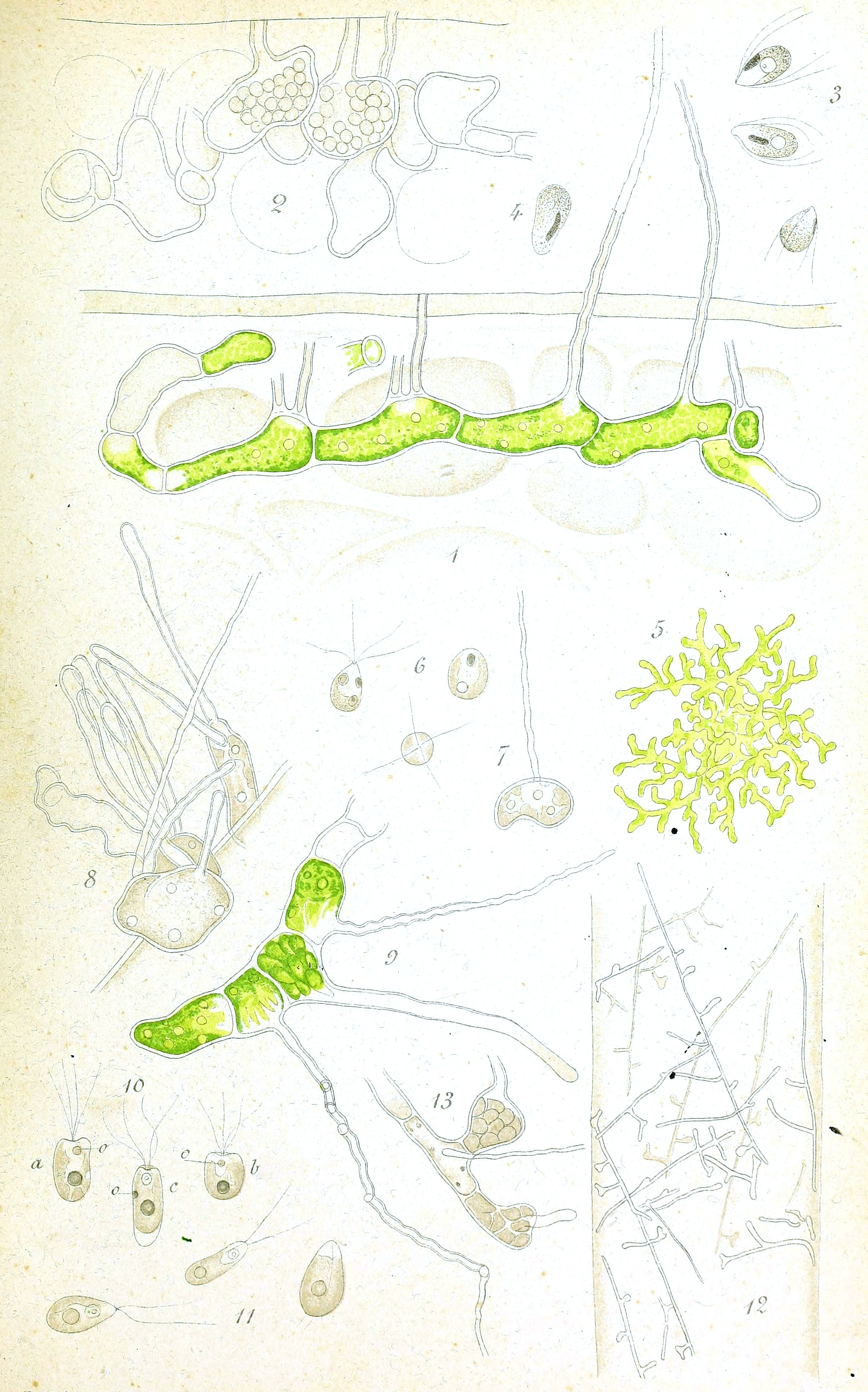
- Phaeophila dendroides

Scientific classification
- Clade: Viridiplantae
- Division: Chlorophyta
- Class: Ulvophyceae
- Order: Ulvales
- Family: Phaeophilaceae
- Genus: Phaeophila; Hauck

Species
- Phaeophila dendroides

= Phaeophila =

Genus of algae

Phaeophila is a genus of green algae in the family Phaeophilaceae.
