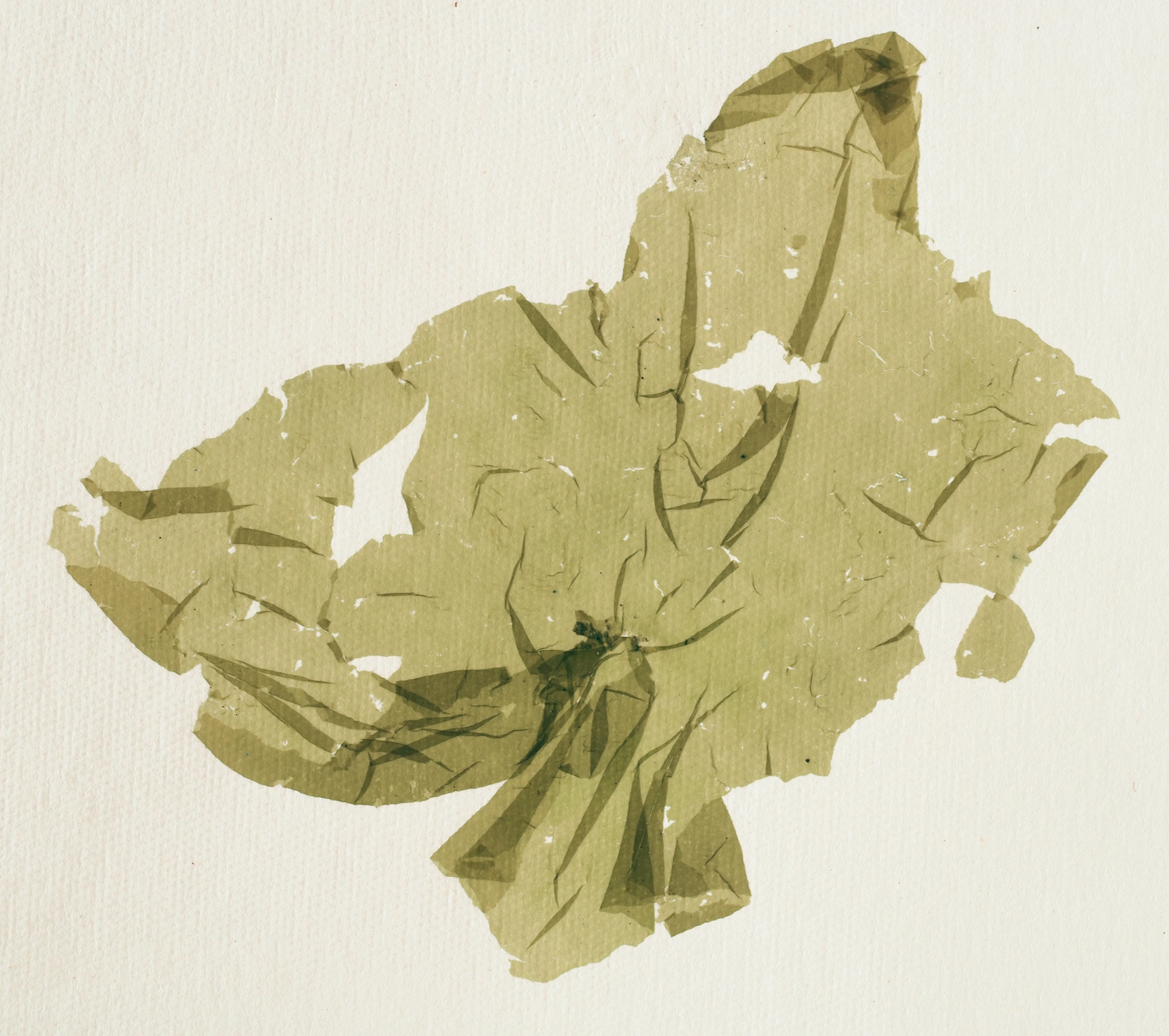
- Gayralia oxysperma

Scientific classification
- Kingdom: Plantae
- Division: Chlorophyta
- Class: Ulvophyceae
- Order: Ulotrichales
- Family: Gayraliaceae; K.L.Vinogradova

Genera
- Gayralia; Ulosarcina

= Gayraliaceae =

Family of algae

Gayraliaceae is a family of green algae in the order Ulotrichales.
