= Rhipiliaceae =

Scientific classification
- Clade: Viridiplantae
- Division: Chlorophyta
- Class: Ulvophyceae
- Order: Bryopsidales
- Family: Rhipiliaceae; Dragastan, D.K.Richter, Kube, Popa, Sarbu & Ciugulea

Genera
- Rhipilia; Rhipiliopsis; Siphonoclathrus

Family of algae

Rhipiliaceae is a family of green algae in the order Bryopsidales.
