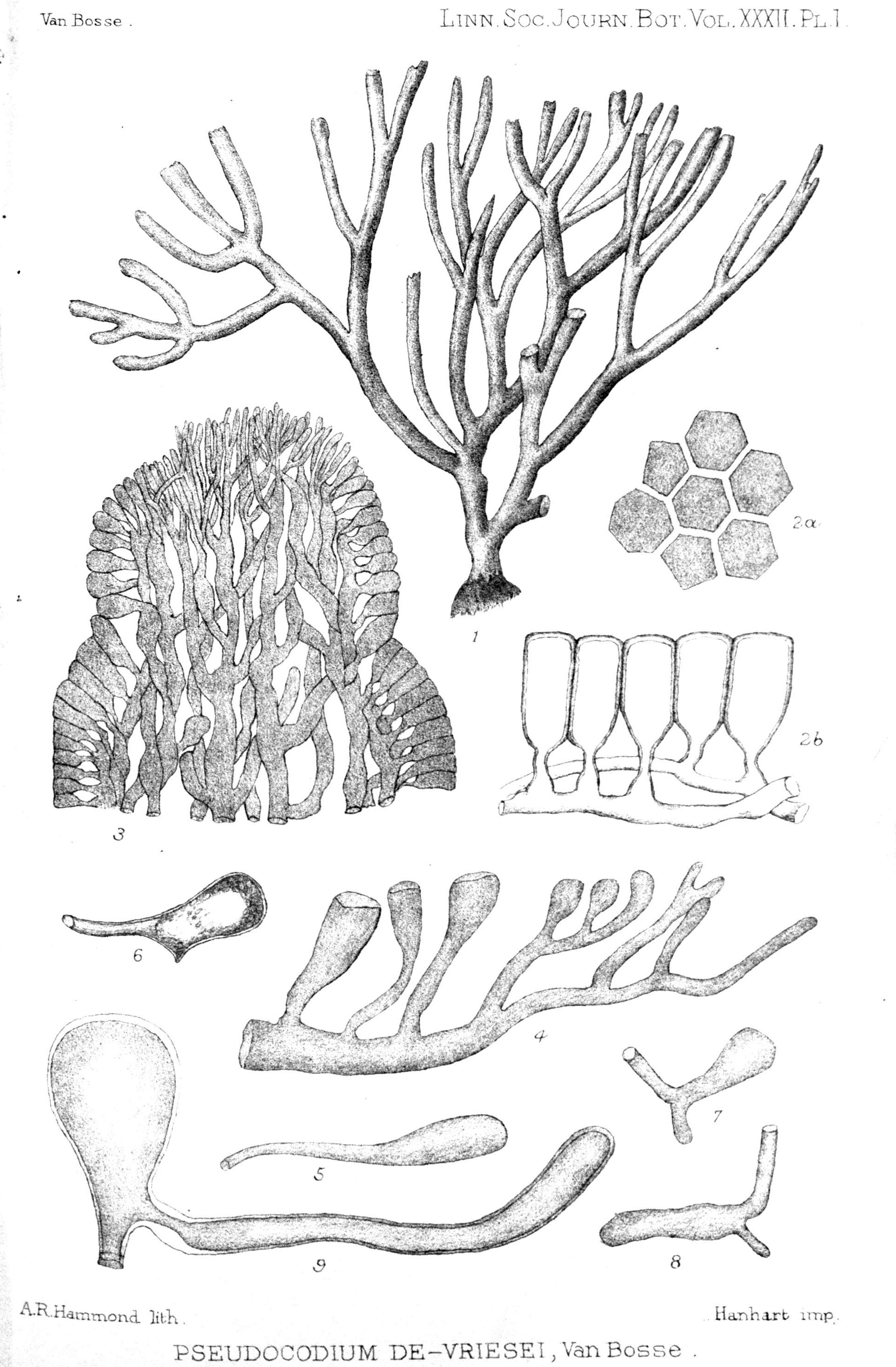
- Pseudocodium devriesii

Scientific classification
- Kingdom: Plantae
- Division: Chlorophyta
- Class: Ulvophyceae
- Order: Bryopsidales
- Family: Pseudocodiaceae
- Genus: Pseudocodium; Weber-van Bosse, 1896

Type species
- Pseudocodium devriesii Weber-van Bosse, 1896

Species
- Pseudocodium australasicum; Pseudocodium devriesii; Pseudocodium floridanum

= Pseudocodium =

Genus of algae

Pseudocodium is a genus of green algae in the family Pseudocodiaceae.
