= Pedobesia =

Scientific classification
- Kingdom: Plantae
- Division: Chlorophyta
- Class: Ulvophyceae
- Order: Bryopsidales
- Family: Derbesiaceae
- Genus: Pedobesia; MacRaild & Womersley, 1974

Type species
- Pedobesia clavaeformis (J. Agardh) MacRaild & Womersley, 1974

Species
- Pedobesia clavaeformis; Pedobesia feldmannii; Pedobesia ryukyuensis; Pedobesia simplex; Pedobesia solieri

Genus of algae

Pedobesia is a genus of green algae in the family Derbesiaceae. Species within this genus can be found in New Zealand.
