= Cladocephalus =

Scientific classification
- Clade: Viridiplantae
- Division: Chlorophyta
- Class: Ulvophyceae
- Order: Bryopsidales
- Family: Dichotomosiphonaceae
- Genus: Cladocephalus; M. Howe, 1905

Type species
- Cladocephalus scoparius

Species
- Cladocephalus excentricus; Cladocephalus luteofuscus; Cladocephalus scoparius

Genus of algae

Cladocephalus is a genus of green algae in the family Dichotomosiphonaceae.
