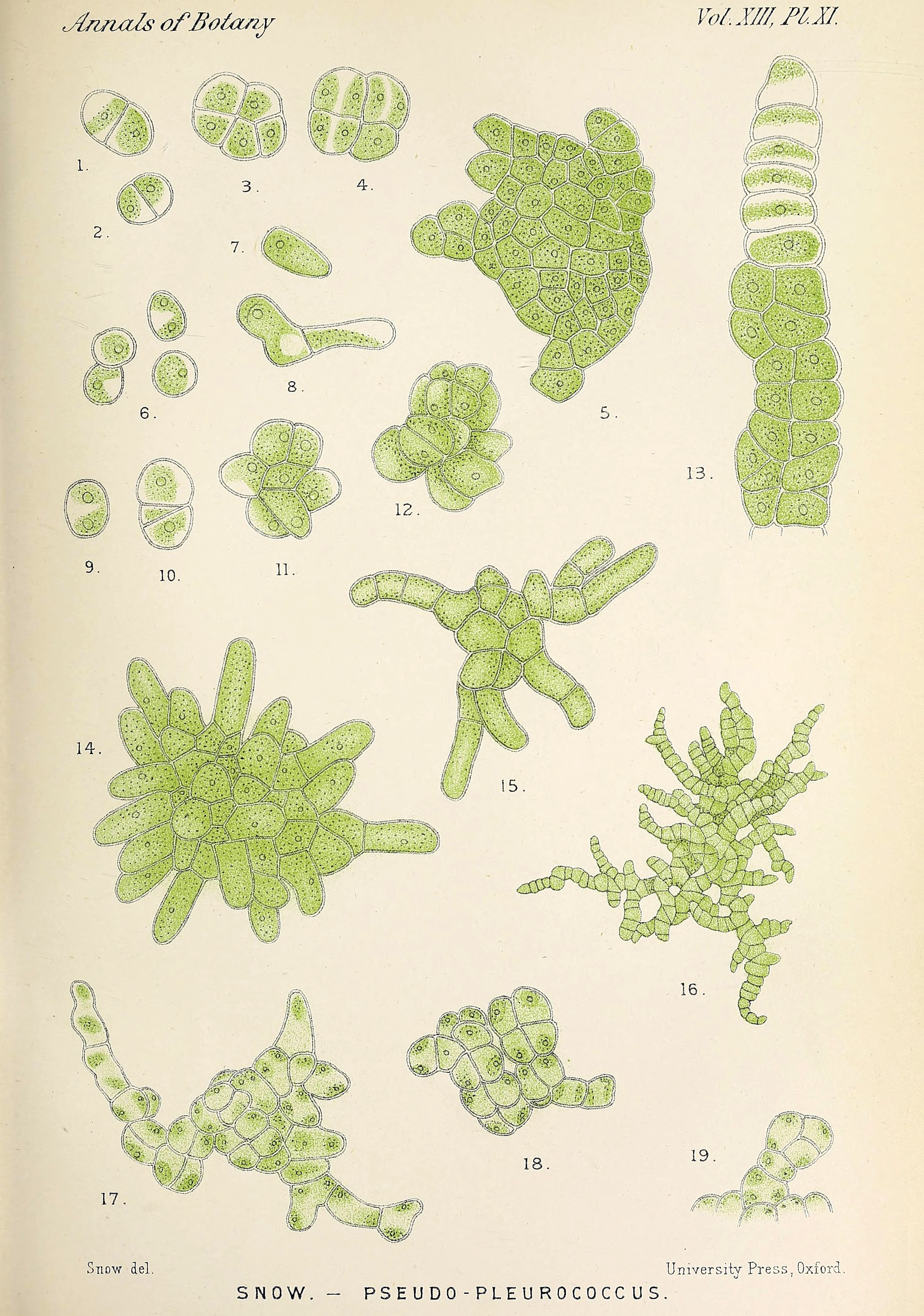
- Pseudopleurococcus botryoides, Pseudopleurococcus vulgaris

Scientific classification
- Kingdom: Plantae
- Division: Chlorophyta
- Class: Ulvophyceae
- Order: Ulvales
- Family: Ctenocladaceae
- Genus: Pseudopleurococcus; J. Snow, 1899

Type species
- Pseudopleurococcus botryoides

Species
- Pseudopleurococcus botryoides; Pseudopleurococcus arthropyreniae; Pseudopleurococcus incrustans; Pseudopleurococcus printzii var. longissimus; Pseudopleurococcus printzii; Pseudopleurococcus vulgaris

= Pseudopleurococcus =

Genus of algae

Pseudopleurococcus is a genus of green algae in the order Ulvales. It was described by J.W. Snow in an 1899 volume of the Annals of Botany. The genus contains six recognized species.
