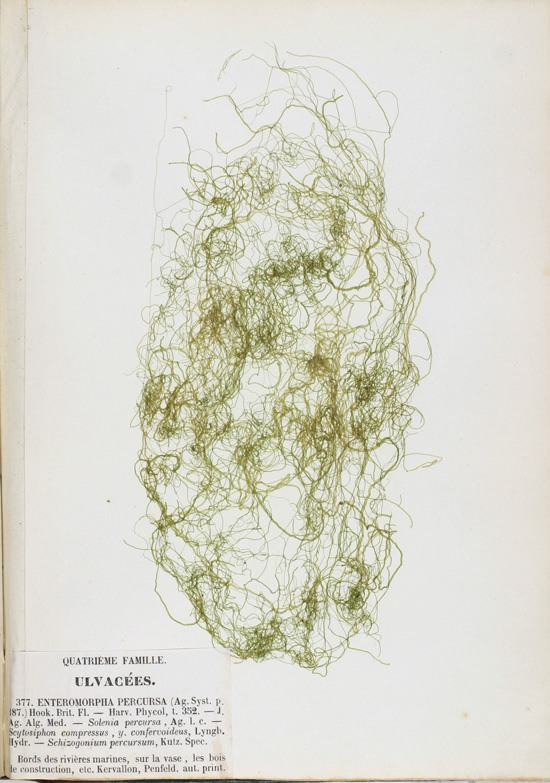
- Percursaria percursa

Scientific classification
- Clade: Viridiplantae
- Division: Chlorophyta
- Class: Ulvophyceae
- Order: Ulvales
- Family: Ulvaceae
- Genus: Percursaria; Bory de Saint-Vincent, 1823

Species
- Percursaria confervoidea (Lyngbye) Foslie; Percursaria fucicola; Percursaria percursa; Percursaria rigens

= Percursaria =

Genus of algae

Percursaria is a genus of green algae in the family Ulvaceae.
