= Petrosiphon =

- Petrosiphon adhaerens

Scientific classification
- Domain: Eukaryota
- Clade: Archaeplastida
- Clade: Viridiplantae
- Division: Chlorophyta
- Class: Ulvophyceae
- Order: Cladophorales
- Family: Valoniaceae
- Genus: Petrosiphon; M.A.Howe

Type species
- Petrosiphon adhaerens M.A.Howe

Genus of green algae

Petrosiphon is a genus of green algae in the family Valoniaceae. It can be found in tropical and subtropical coastal waters.
