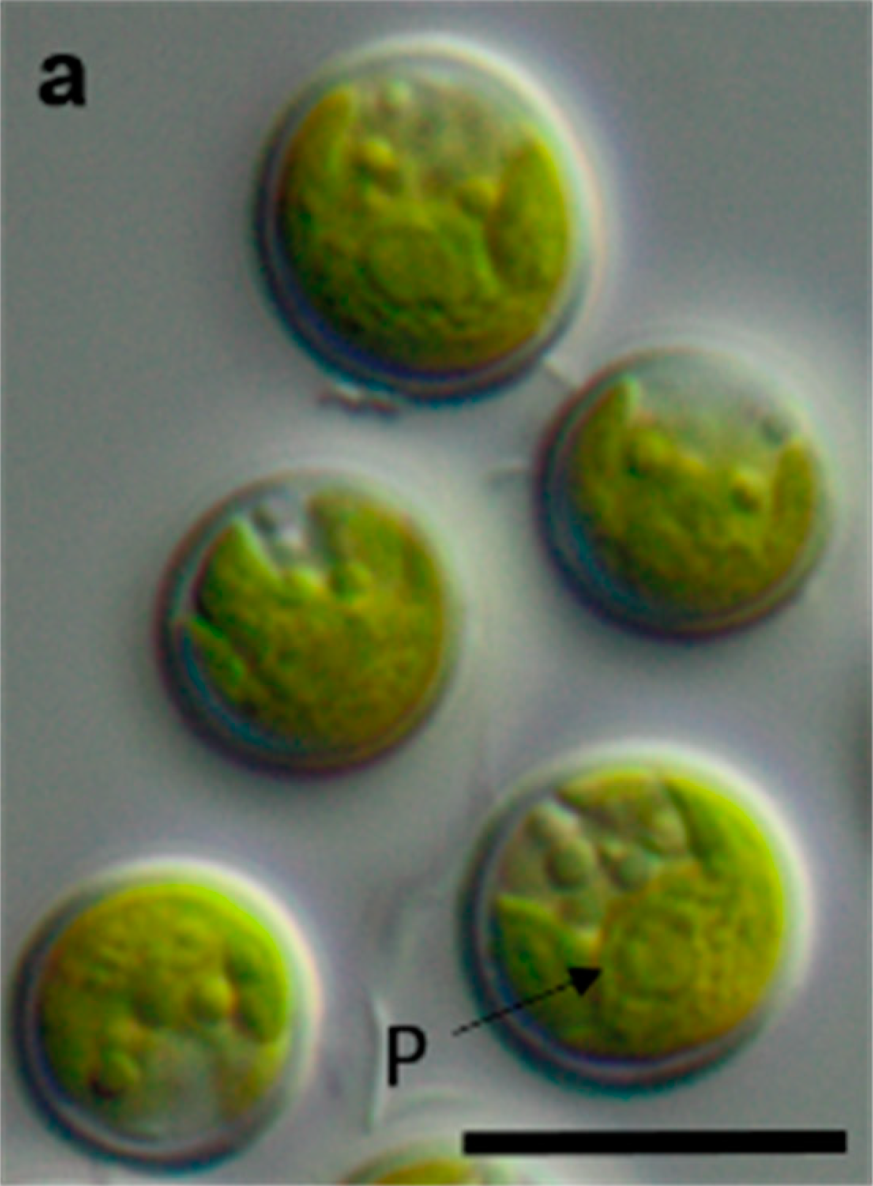
- Desmochloris cf. halophila

Scientific classification
- Clade: Viridiplantae
- Division: Chlorophyta
- Class: Ulvophyceae
- Order: Chlorocystidales
- Family: Chlorocystidaceae
- Genus: Desmochloris; Shin Watanabe, N.Kuroda & F.Maiwa

Species
- Desmochloris edaphica Darienko, Rad-Menéndez, C.N.Campbell & Pröschold; Desmochloris halophila (Guillard, Bold & McEntee) Watanabe, Kuroda & Maiwa; Desmochloris mollenhaueri Darienko, Friedl & Pröschold

= Desmochloris =

Genus of algae

Desmochloris is a genus of green algae, specifically of the Chlorocystidaceae.
