= Dichotomosiphon =

Scientific classification
- Kingdom: Plantae
- Division: Chlorophyta
- Class: Ulvophyceae
- Order: Bryopsidales
- Family: Dichotomosiphonaceae
- Genus: Dichotomosiphon; A. Ernst, 1902

Species
- Dichotomosiphon marinus; Dichotomosiphon salinus; Dichotomosiphon tuberosus

Genus of algae

Dichotomosiphon is a genus of green algae in the family Dichotomosiphonaceae. This genus is distinguished from all other members of the Bryopsidales by its oogamous reproduction and freshwater habitat. In both vegetative and reproductive aspects, it is remarkably similar to the genus Vaucheria, which is a member of the unrelated class Xanthophyceae.
