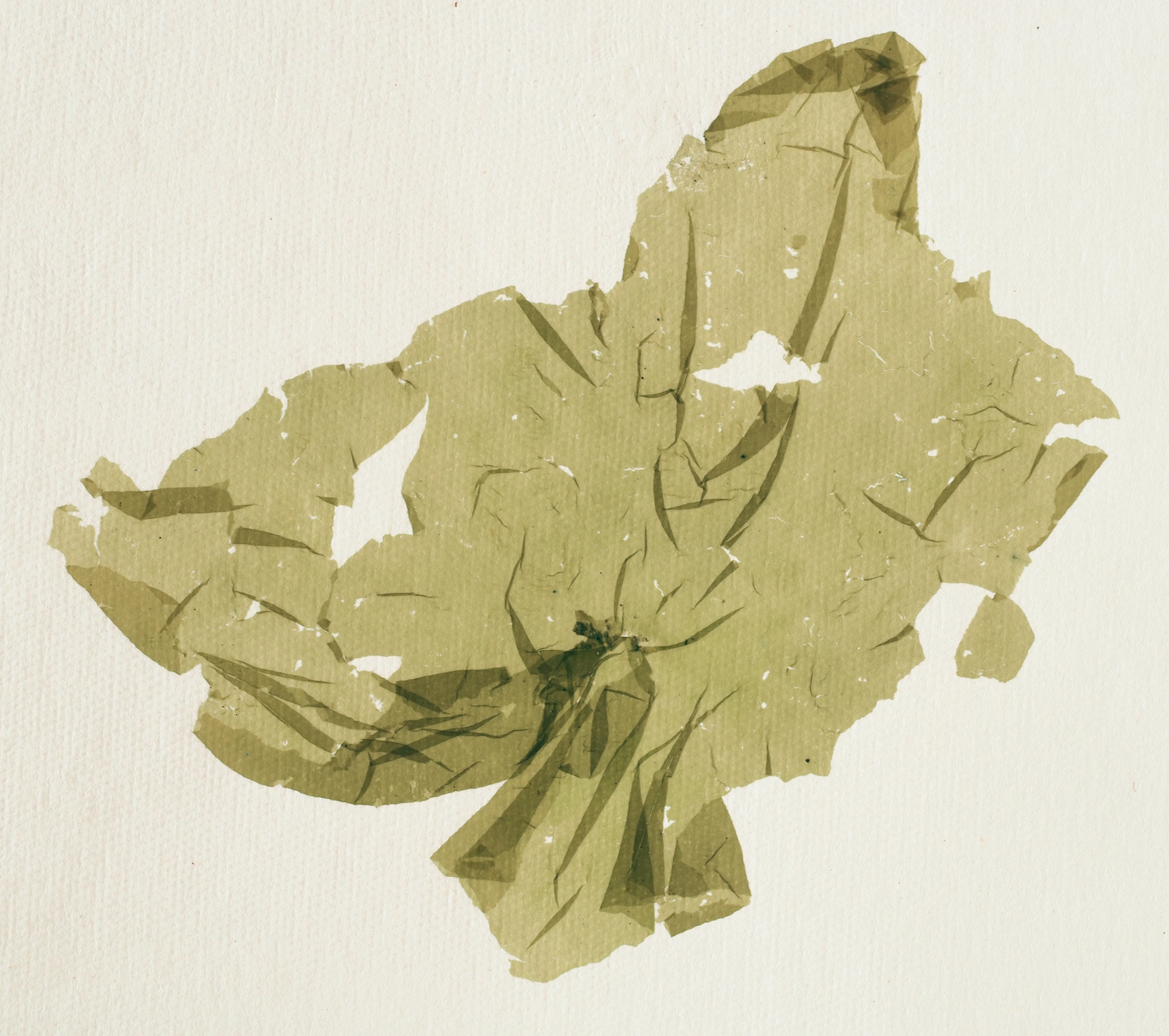

Scientific classification
- Clade: Viridiplantae
- Division: Chlorophyta
- Class: Ulvophyceae
- Order: Ulotrichales
- Family: Gayraliaceae
- Genus: Gayralia; K.L.Vinogradova

Species
- G. oxysperma (Kützing) K.L.Vinogradova ex Scagel et al.; G. brasiliensis Pellizzari, M.C.Oliveira & N.S.Yokoya

= Gayralia =

Genus of algae

Gayralia is a genus of green algae in the family Gayraliaceae.
