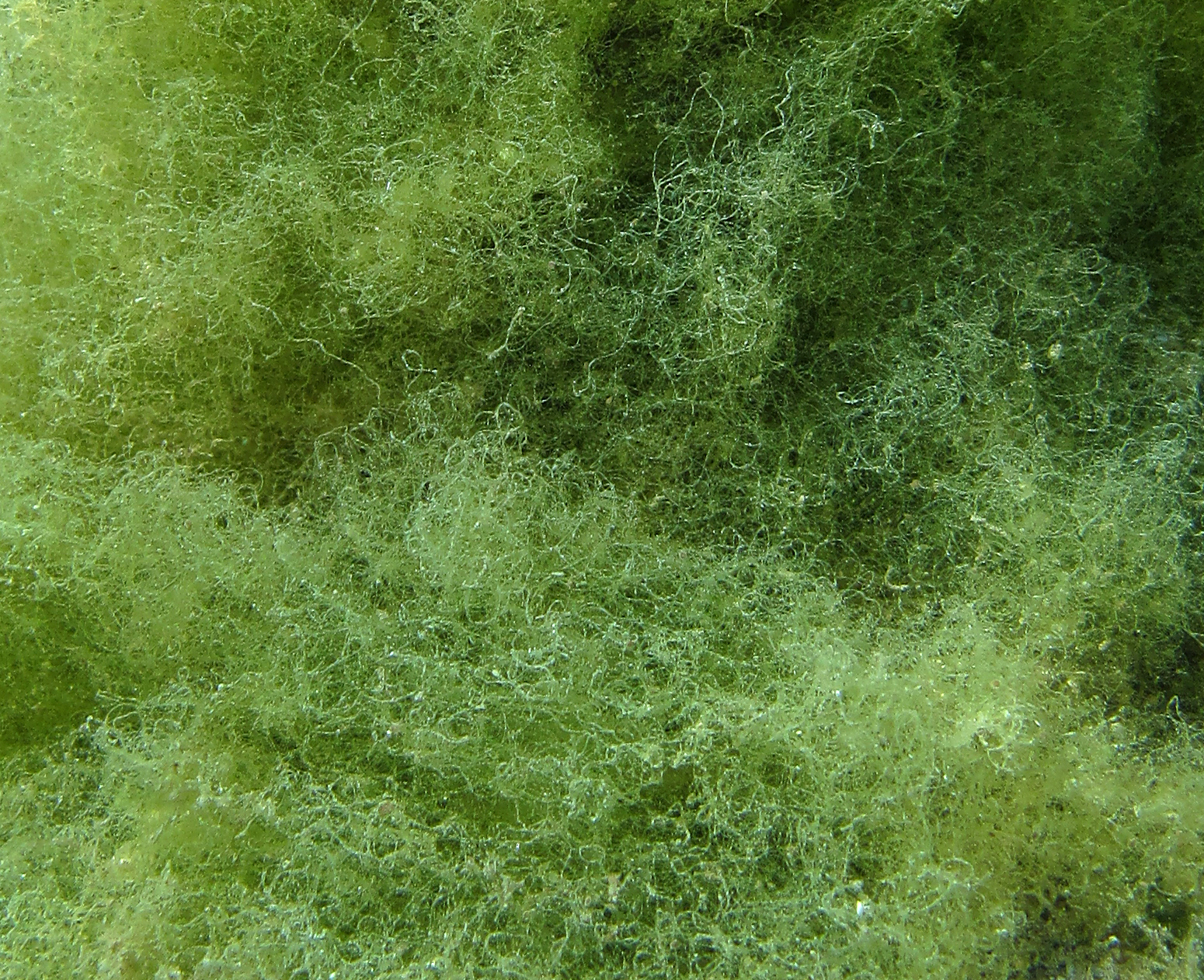
- Derbesia sp.

Scientific classification
- Clade: Viridiplantae
- Division: Chlorophyta
- Class: Ulvophyceae
- Order: Bryopsidales
- Family: Derbesiaceae
- Genus: Derbesia; Solier, 1846

Type species
- Derbesia marina (Lyngbye) Solier, 1846

Species
- About 20, see text

Synonyms
- Halicystis

= Derbesia =

Genus of algae

Derbesia is a genus of green algae in the family Derbesiaceae. The plant was originally known from different names applied to its larger sporophyte, Derbesia, and its less conspicuous gametophyte, Halicystis. Derbesia was successfully cultured in the laboratories of German phycologist Peter Kornmann to learn that both it and the plant Halicystis were different parts of the life cycle of the same organism.

The genus name of Derbesia is in honour of Auguste Alphonse Derbès (1818–1894), French naturalist, zoologist and botanist, Professor of Natural Sciences at the University of Aix-Marseille.

== List of species ==
- Derbesia attenuata
- Derbesia boergesenii
- Derbesia corallicola
- Derbesia fastigiata
- Derbesia furcata
- Derbesia hollenbergii
- Derbesia indica
- Derbesia longifructa
- Derbesia marina
- Derbesia minima
- Derbesia novae-zelandiae
- Derbesia osterhoutii
- Derbesia pacifica
- Derbesia padinae
- Derbesia prolifica
- Derbesia rhizophora
- Derbesia sirenarum
- Derbesia tenuissima
- Derbesia turbinata
- Derbesia vaucheriaeformis
