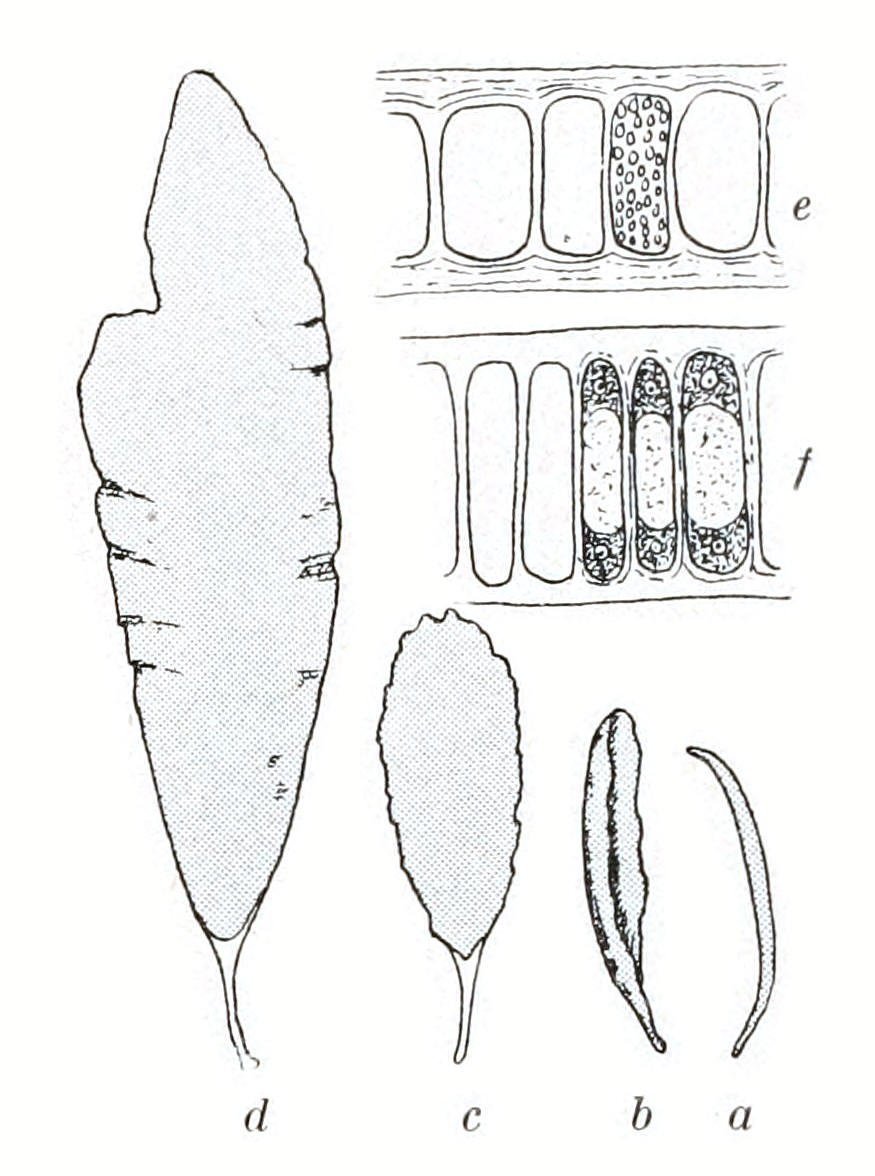
- Ulvaria splendens

Scientific classification
- Kingdom: Plantae
- Division: Chlorophyta
- Class: Ulvophyceae
- Order: Ulvales
- Family: Ulvaceae
- Genus: Ulvaria; Ruprecht, 1850

Species
- See text

= Ulvaria (alga) =

Genus of algae

Ulvaria is a genus of green algae in the family Ulvaceae. It is similar to Ulva, but rather than being two cells thick, it is only one, despite its darker colour.

== Species in the genus Ulvaria ==
- Ulvaria obscura
- Ulvaria fusca
- Ulva fenestrata
