= Pseudocodiaceae =

Scientific classification
- Domain: Eukaryota
- Clade: Archaeplastida
- Clade: Viridiplantae
- Division: Chlorophyta
- Class: Ulvophyceae
- Order: Bryopsidales
- Family: Pseudocodiaceae; L. Hillis-Colinvaux

Genus
- Pseudocodium

Family of algae

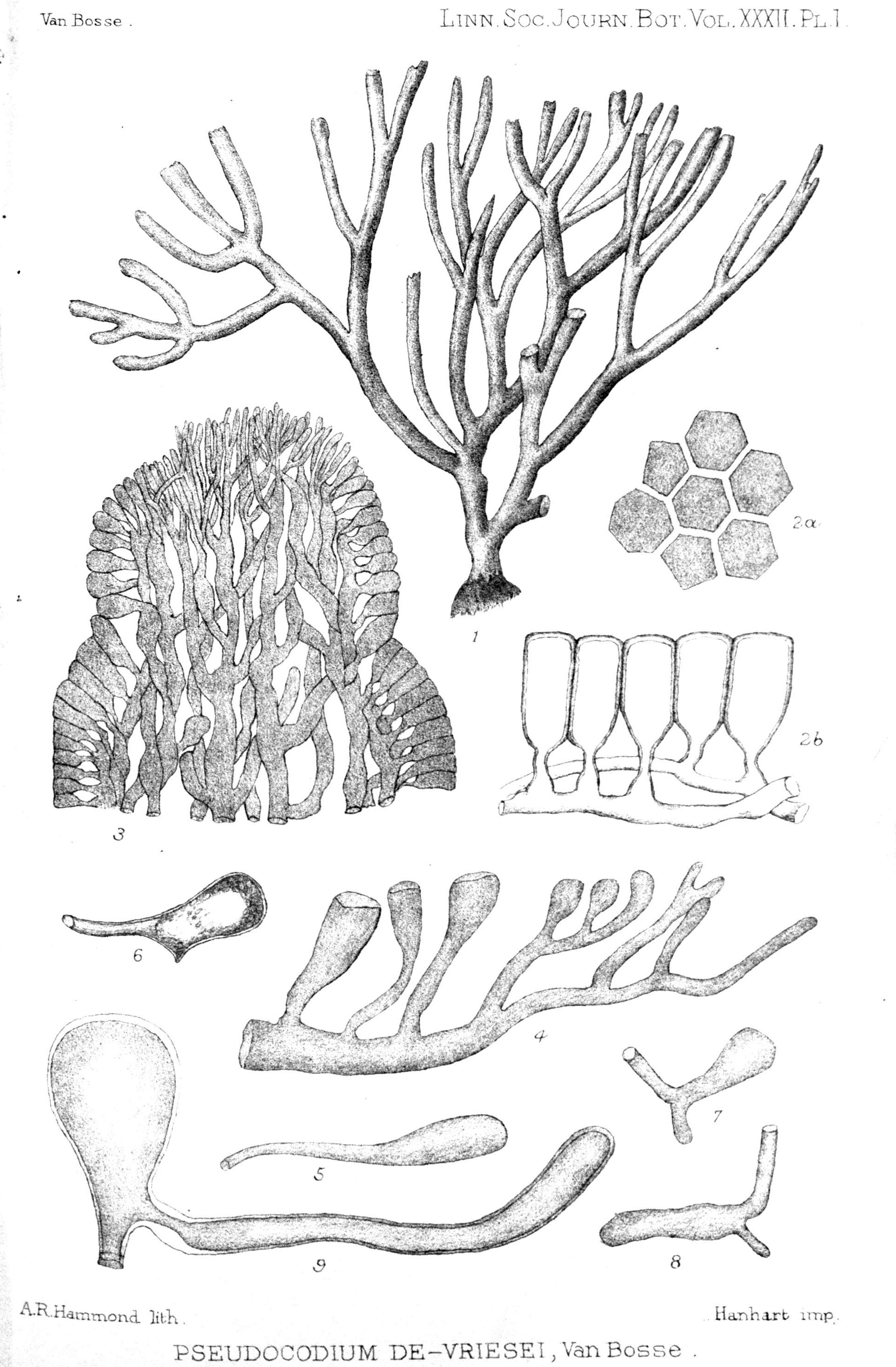
Pseudocodium devriesii

Pseudocodiaceae is a family of green algae in the order Bryopsidales.
