= Cloniophora =

Scientific classification
- Kingdom: Plantae
- Division: Chlorophyta
- Class: Ulvophyceae
- Order: Ulvales
- Family: Cloniophoraceae; A.L.Carlile, C.J.O'Kelly & A.R.Sherwood
- Genus: Cloniophora; Tiffany, 1936

Type species
- Cloniophora willei

Species
- Cloniophora capitellata; Cloniophora macrocladia; Cloniophora paihiae; Cloniophora plumosa; Cloniophora shanxiensis; Cloniophora spicata; Cloniophora tibetica; Cloniophora willei

Genus of algae

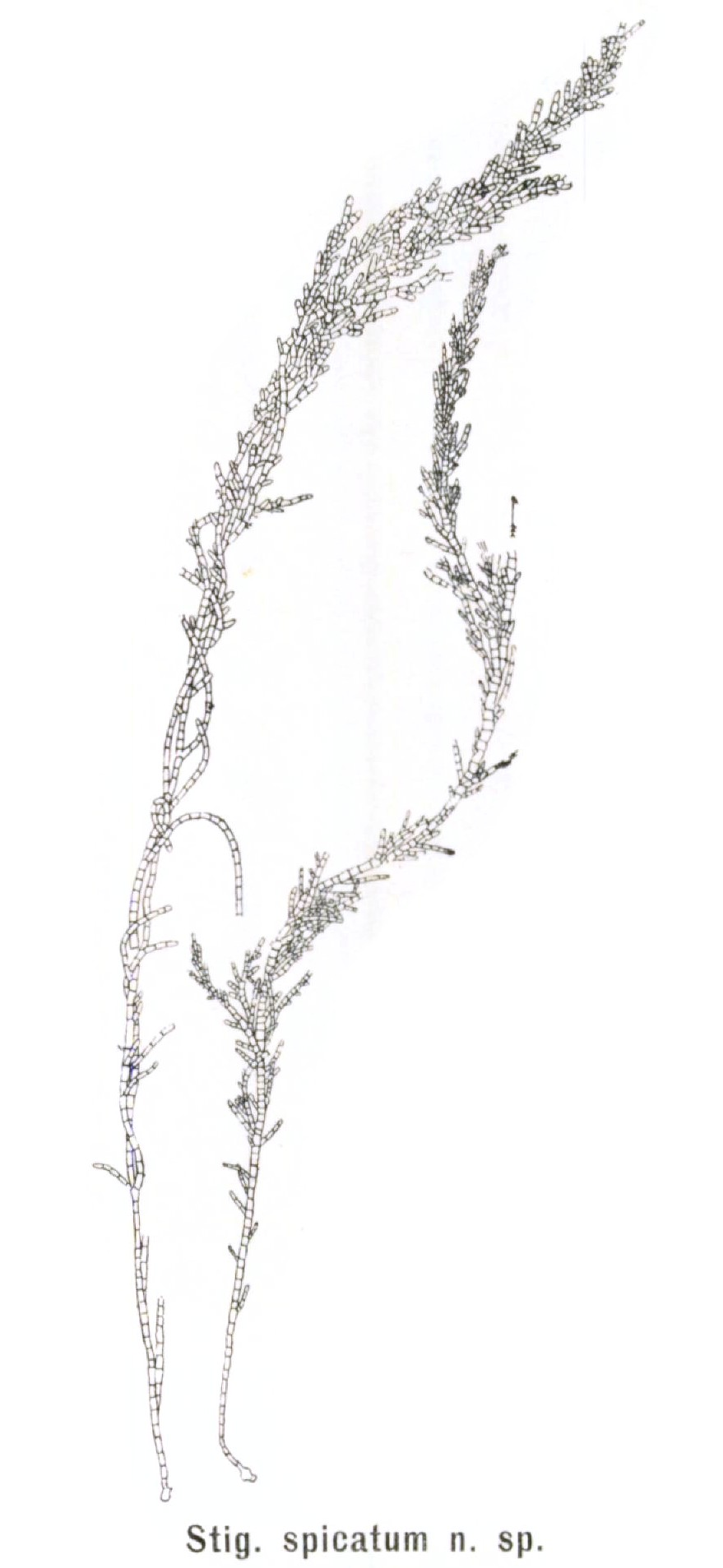

Cloniophora is a genus of green algae, and is the only genus in the family Cloniophoraceae. Cloniophora is primarily found in flowing freshwater habitats, attached to substrates such as rocks; it is sometimes found in brackish waters as well. Cloniophora is widely distributed in tropical and subtropical regions, but is also found along the Atlantic Seaboard north to New Brunswick.

== Description ==
Cloniophora consists of erect, uniseriate (one cell wide) filaments of cells attached to a substrate via rhizoidal branches. The filaments are branched, with secondary branches being irregularly arranged and much smaller than primary ones. Filaments end in a conical or blunt-tipped apex. Cells contain a single parietal band-shaped chloroplast and one to several pyrenoids.

Reproduction occurs via zoospores or gametes which are biflagellate. The zoosporangia or gametangia produce at least eight zoospores or gametes respectively which exit through a papilla at the apical end of the cell.

== Classification ==
The genus Cloniophora is similar to Draparnaldia and Stigeoclonium, and was formerly placed in Chaetophorales based on general morphology. However, it differs in the latter two genera in its branching pattern, shape of the apical cells, and by lacking apical hairs on the filaments. Molecular phylogenetic studies support its placement in the order Ulvales.
