= Rhipiliopsis =

Scientific classification
- Kingdom: Plantae
- Division: Chlorophyta
- Class: Ulvophyceae
- Order: Bryopsidales
- Family: Rhipiliaceae
- Genus: Rhipiliopsis; A. Gepp & E.S. Gepp, 1911

Type species
- Rhipiliopsis peltata

Species
- Rhipiliopsis aegyptiacaa; Rhipiliopsis carolyniae; Rhipiliopsis corticata; Rhipiliopsis echinocaulos; Rhipiliopsis gracilis; Rhipiliopsis howensis; Rhipiliopsis madagascariensis; Rhipiliopsis millarii; Rhipiliopsis mortensenii; Rhipiliopsis multiplex; Rhipiliopsis peltata; Rhipiliopsis profunda; Rhipiliopsis reticulata; Rhipiliopsis robusta; Rhipiliopsis stri; Rhipiliopsis yaeyamensis

Genus of algae

Rhipiliopsis is a genus of green algae in the family Rhipiliaceae. Johnson-sea-linkia is a synonym.

== Morphology ==
According to Algaebase as described by Kraft (1986), the thallus height ranges from less than 5 mm to above 7 cm, non-calcified and the prostrate rhizome or digitate processes within the substratum gives rise to the blade and stalk system. The fronds are monostromatic or polystromatic having irregularly lanceolate or regularly to excentrically peltate, with siphons dichotomously branched and generally equally constricted above dichotomy. A somewhat differentiated cortex was observed on upper and lower surfaces of fronds and scattered spines occur on blade siphons for the two species with thickest blade. The stalks can be monosiphonous or multisiphonous where monosiphonous stalks are smooth, or variously covered with spinous processes. The constituent siphons cohere at scattered and isolated points by circular rings of wall thickening at tips of lateral papillae or foreshortened blade-siphon dichotomies. Heteroplastic, except possibly for Johnson-Sea-Linkia, with ovoid chloroplasts and larger reniform amyloplasts.

Additional description was provided by Lagourgue and Payri in which Rhipiliopsis described as much smaller in size and more delicate than Rhipilia species and the papillae are less developed than the tenacula of Rhipilia but give a cohesive and net-like appearance to the blade. Rhipiliopsis species are characterized of a mono- or multisiphonous stipe and a mono- or pluristromatic blade (flabellate, peltate, or cyathiform).

== Distribution ==
Rhipiliopsis distribution based on Algaebase is predominantly tropical, with most species known only from type and limited ranges. This coincides with the study of Lagourgue and Payri (2021) on Rhipileae and Rhipiliopsideae where, Rhipiliopsis have a pantropical distribution and none of the species they studied appeared to be cosmopolitan; instead, they have restricted distributions.

Recorded collections of the genus were observed in the western and southwestern Pacific Ocean and Australia and in the Philippines. Two species are endemic to temperate coasts of southern Australia (R. peltata and R. robusta).

== Ecology ==
The genus were observed to grow commonly in low, intertidal to shallow subtidal rocky habitats on wave-exposed temperate area. The vertical growth ranges from the low intertidal to 153m. Littler and Littler (1994) reported that the deepest occurring fleshy upright alga (that can be found attached to bedrock at a depth of 210m is Rhipiliopsis profunda.

== Life history ==
Reproduction is unreported in all but type species which has been illustrated with single ovoid to pyriform, stalked zooidangia borne singly and laterally on medullary siphons.

Exploitation/harvesting/cultivation: No recorded data of cultivation

Chemical composition/natural products chemistry. Unlike other green seaweeds (Ulva and Caulerpa), the biological activities of the genus Rhipiliopsis are still unexplored.

Utilization and management: Currently, no identified utilization.
