= Chaetosiphon (alga) =

Scientific classification
- Clade: Viridiplantae
- Division: Chlorophyta
- Class: Ulvophyceae
- Order: Bryopsidales
- Family: Chaetosiphonaceae; Blackman & Tansley, 1902
- Genus: Chaetosiphon; Huber, 1893

Type species
- Chaetosiphon moniliformis Huber, 1892

Species
- Chaetosiphon moniliformis

Genus of algae

Chaetosiphon is a genus of green algae in the family Chaetosiphonaceae.
