= Protoderma =

Scientific classification
- Clade: Viridiplantae
- Division: Chlorophyta
- Class: Chlorophyceae
- Order: Chaetophorales
- Family: Chaetophoraceae
- Genus: Protoderma; Kützing, 1843

Species
- Protoderma amorphum Rosenvinge, 1924; Protoderma beesleyi (F.E.Fritsch) Printz, 1964; Protoderma brownii F.E.Fritsch, 1912; Protoderma cohaerens (Wittrock) Printz, 1964; Protoderma daphnicola Fott, 1973; Protoderma frequens (Butcher) Printz, 1964; Protoderma pax-augustana P.González, 1947; Protoderma polyrhizum M.Howe, 1924; Protoderma viride Kützing, 1843

Genus of algae

Protoderma is a genus of green algae in the family Chaetophoraceae.
