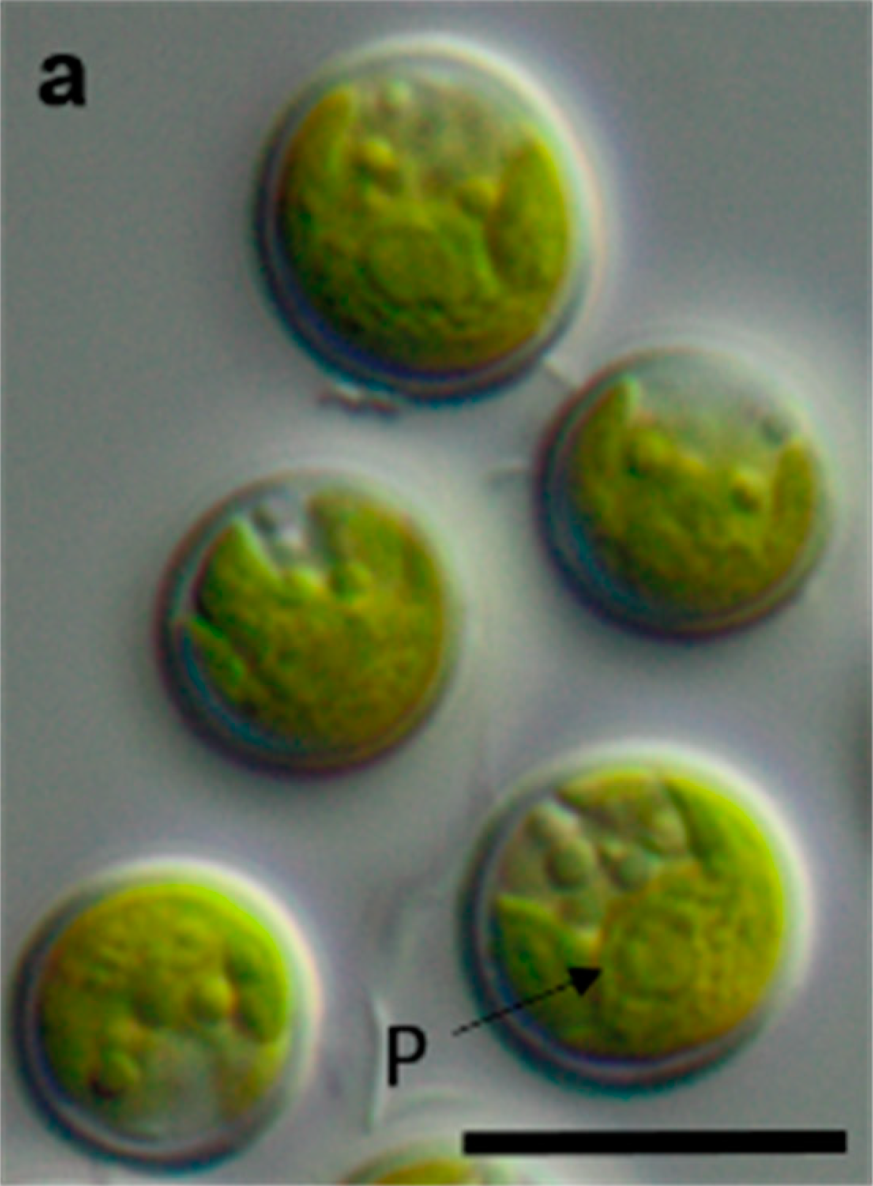
- Desmochloris cf. halophila

Scientific classification
- Kingdom: Plantae
- Division: Chlorophyta
- Class: Ulvophyceae
- Order: Chlorocystidales; Kornmann & Sahling
- Family: Chlorocystidaceae; Kornmann & Sahling

Genera
- Chlorocystis L.Reinhard – 7 species; Desmochloris Shin Watanabe, N.Kuroda & F.Maiwa – 3 species

= Chlorocystidaceae =

Family of algae

Chlorocystidaceae is a family of green algae. It is the only family in the order Chlorocystidales. The family was formerly placed in the order Ulotrichales.
