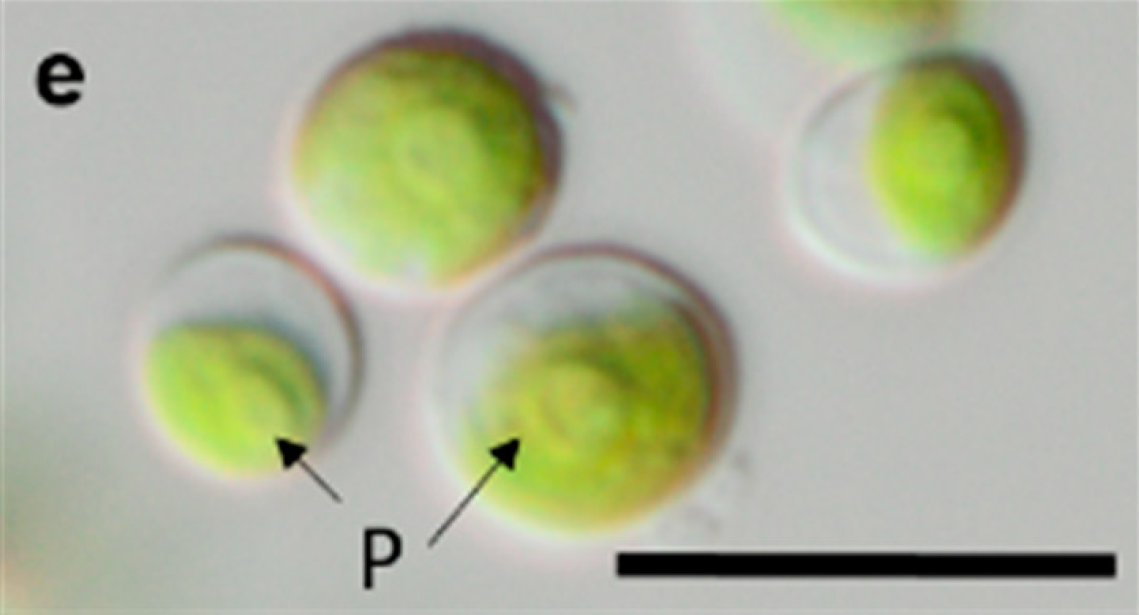
- Planophila sp.

Scientific classification
- Clade: Viridiplantae
- Division: Chlorophyta
- Class: Chlorophyceae
- Order: Chaetopeltidales
- Family: Chaetopeltidaceae
- Genus: Planophila; Gerneck, 1907

Species
- Planophila asymmetrica (Gerneck) Wille, 1909; Planophila bipyrenoidosa R; Planophila laetevirens Gerneck, 1907

= Planophila =

Genus of algae

Planophila is a genus of green algae in the order Chaetopeltidales.
