= Oltmannsiellopsidaceae =

Scientific classification
- Kingdom: Plantae
- Division: Chlorophyta
- Class: Ulvophyceae
- Order: Oltmannsiellopsidales; T.Nakayama, Shin Watanabe & I.Inouye, 1996
- Family: Oltmannsiellopsidaceae; Dragastan, D.K.Richter, Kube, Popa, Sarbu & Ciugulea

Genera
- Dangemannia; Halochlorococcum; Neodangemannia; Oltmannsiellopsis

Family of algae

Oltmannsiellopsidaceae is a family of green algae in the class Ulvophyceae. It is the sole family in the order Oltmannsiellopsidales.

It contains the genus Oltmannsiellopsis.
