= Oltmannsiellopsis =

Scientific classification
- Kingdom: Plantae
- Division: Chlorophyta
- Class: Ulvophyceae
- Order: Oltmannsiellopsidales
- Family: Oltmannsiellopsidaceae
- Genus: Oltmannsiellopsis; M.Chihara & I.Inouye, 1986

Type species
- Oltmannsiellopsis viridis (Hargraves & R.L.Steele) M.Chihara & I.Inouye, 1986

Species
- O. viridis (Hargraves & R.L.Steele) M.Chihara & I.Inouye, 1986; O. unicellularis I.Inouye & M.Chihara, 1986; O. geminata I.Inouye & M.Chihara, 1986

Genus of algae

Oltmannsiellopsis is a genus of marine colonial flagellate green algae in the Oltmannsiellopsidaceae family of Chlorophyta. It was named in reference to the similar genus Oltmannsiella. It has three species, O. viridis, which forms four-celled colonies, O. unicellularis, which is single celled, and O. geminata, which forms two-celled colonies. In Japanese it is called ウミイカダモ (umiikadamo).
