= Pseudocharacium =

Scientific classification
- Kingdom: Plantae
- Division: Chlorophyta
- Class: Ulvophyceae
- Order: Ignatiales
- Family: Ignatiaceae
- Genus: Pseudocharacium; Korshikov

Species
- Pseudocharacium acuminatum Korshikov; Pseudocharacium americanum K.W.Lee & Bold; Pseudocharacium obtusum (A.Braun) Petry-Hesse

Genus of algae

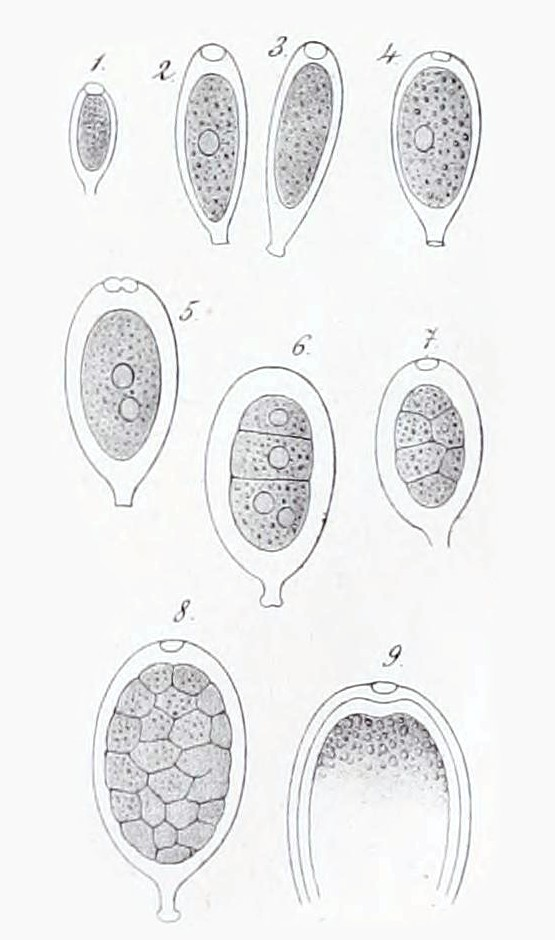
Pseudocharacium

Pseudocharacium is a genus of green algae in the family Ignatiaceae.
