= Blastophysa =

Scientific classification
- Clade: Viridiplantae
- Division: Chlorophyta
- Class: Ulvophyceae
- Order: incertae sedis
- Family: incertae sedis
- Genus: Blastophysa; Reinke, 1889
- Species: B. rhizopus

Binomial name
- Blastophysa rhizopus Reinke, 1889

Genus of algae

Blastophysa is a genus of green algae in the class Ulvophyceae. As of February 2022, in AlgaeBase the only species is Blastophysa rhizopus.
