= Rhexinema =

Scientific classification
- Kingdom: Plantae
- Division: Chlorophyta
- Class: Ulvophyceae
- Order: Ulotrichales
- Family: Helicodictyaceae
- Genus: Rhexinema; Geitler, 1943

Type species
- Rhexinema paucicellularis

Species
- Rhexinema edaphicum Darienko, Pröschold & Lukesová; Rhexinema paucicellulare (Vischer) Geitler; Rhexinema sancta-tomeum Darienko & Pröschold; Rhexinema terrestris Fritsch & John

Genus of algae

Rhexinema is a genus of green algae in the order Ulotrichales. Recent research has suggested that the genus Helicodictyon is a synonym of Rhexinema.
