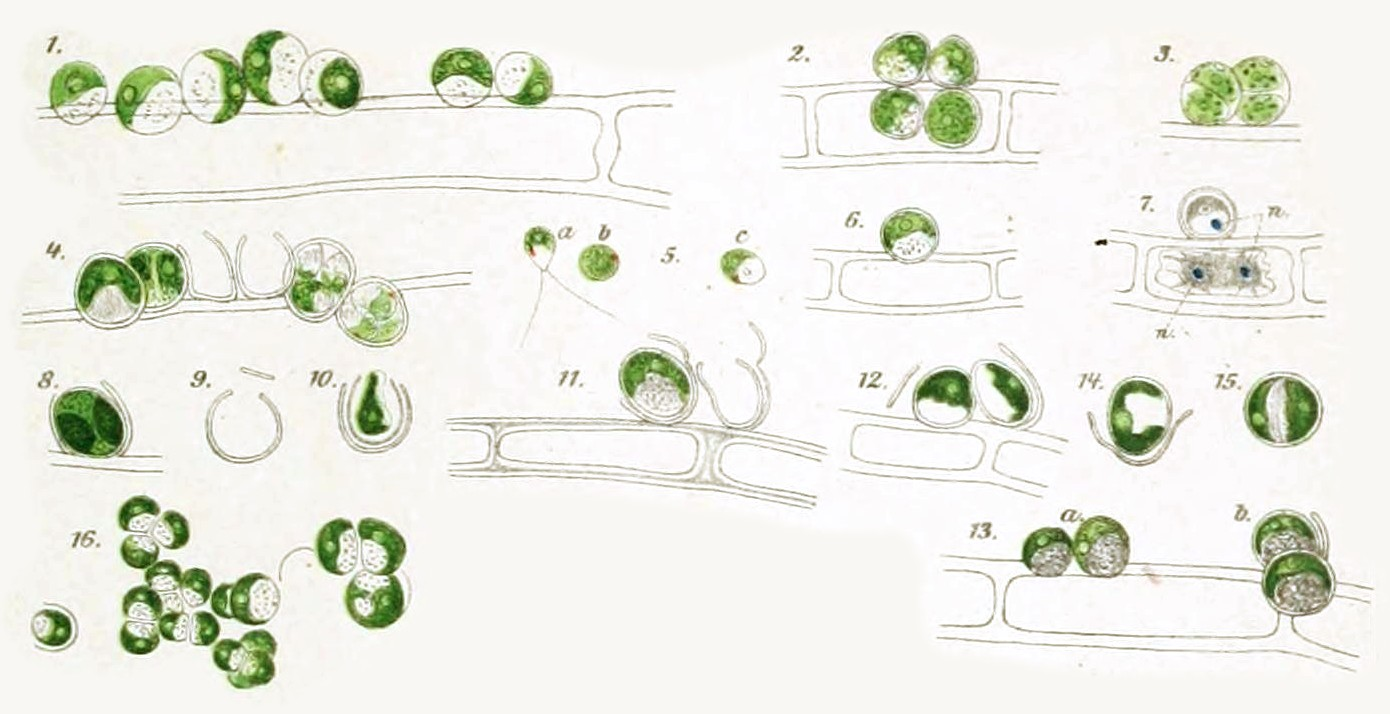
- Sykidion droebakense

Scientific classification
- Clade: Viridiplantae
- Division: Chlorophyta
- Class: Ulvophyceae
- Order: Sykidiales; Darienko & al.
- Family: Sykidiacaeae; Darienko & al.
- Genus: Sykidion; E.P.Wright, 1881

Type species
- Sykidion dyeri

Species
- See text.

Synonyms
- Pseudoneochloris Shin Watanabe & al., 2000

= Sykidion =

Genus of algae

Sykidion is a genus of green algae. Pseudoneochloris is a synonym of this genus. As of March 2022, Sykidion was the only genus in the family Sykidiacaeae, which was the only family in the order Sykidiales.

== Species ==
As of March 2022, AlgaeBase accepted the following species:

- Sykidion droebakense Wille
- Sykidion dyeri E.P.Wright
- Sykidion gomphonematis K.I.Meyer
- Sykidion marinum (Shin Watanabe & al.) Darienko & al., syn. Pseudoneochloris marina
- Sykidion praecipitans (Tschermak-Woess) Komárek
