= Hazenia =

Scientific classification
- Kingdom: Plantae
- Division: Chlorophyta
- Class: Ulvophyceae
- Order: Ulotrichales
- Family: Hazeniaceae; Škaloud & Leliaert, 2018
- Genus: Hazenia; H.C. Bold, 1958

Type species
- Hazenia mirabilis H.C. Bold, 1958

Species
- Hazenia basiliensis; Hazenia broadyi; Hazenia mirabilis

Synonyms
- Chamaetrichon Tupa

Genus of algae

Hazenia is a genus of green algae, the only genus in the family Hazeniaceae.

The genus name of Hazenia is in honour of Tracy Elliot Hazen (1874–1943), who was an American botanist and author specializing in the study of fresh water sourced algae.

The genus was circumscribed by Harold Charles Bold in Amer. J. Bot. vol.45 on page 742 in 1958.
