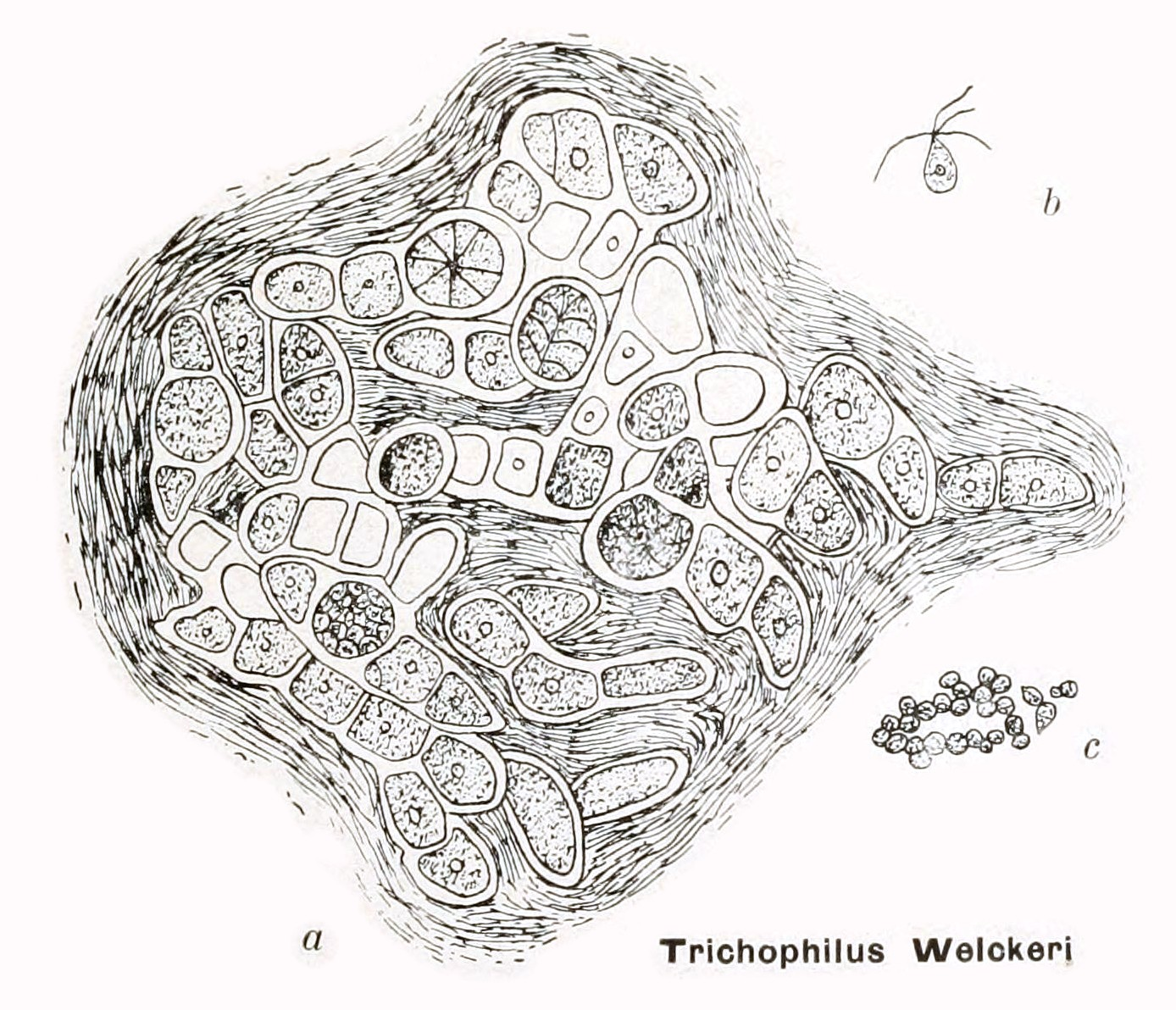
- Trichophilus welckeri

Scientific classification
- Kingdom: Plantae
- Division: Chlorophyta
- Class: Ulvophyceae
- Order: incertae sedis
- Family: incertae sedis
- Genus: Trichophilus; Weber-van Bosse, 1887

Type species
- Trichophilus welckeri

Species
- Trichophilus neniae; Trichophilus welckeri

= Trichophilus =

Genus of algae

Trichophilus is a genus of green algae. Trichophilus welckeri is found growing in the fur of certain sloth species and is believed to provide them with camouflage.

Trichophilus consists of prostrate filaments of cells. Filaments are one or multiple cells wide, dividing irregularly to form short branches, and are crowded and parenchyma-like (pseudoparenchymatous). Cells have thick walls and each contains a parietal chloroplast with an obscured pyrenoid. Trichophilus reproduces via zoospores of two sizes, each with four flagella.
