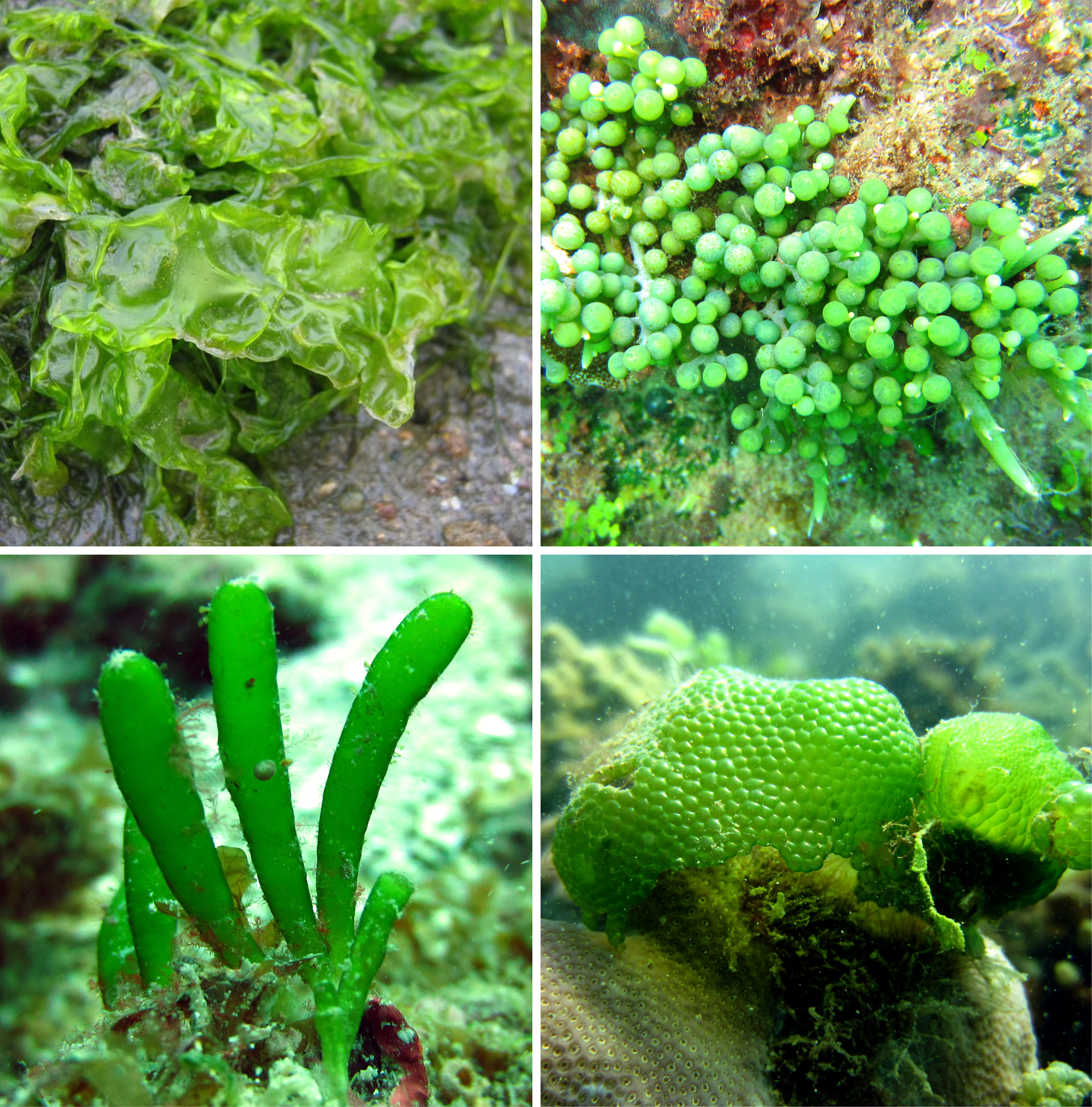
- Diversity of Ulvophyceae. Top left: Ulva. Top right: Bornetella. Bottom left: Caulerpa. Bottom right: Dictyosphaeria

Scientific classification
- Domain: Eukaryota
- Clade: Archaeplastida
- Clade: Viridiplantae
- Division: Chlorophyta
- Subdivision: Chlorophytina
- Class: Ulvophyceae; Stewart & Mattox, 1978

Orders
- Acrosiphoniales; Bryopsidales; Chlorocystidales; Cladophorales; Dasycladales; Ignatiales; Oltmannsiellopsidales; †Receptaculitales; Scotinosphaerales; Solotvyniales; Sykidiales; Trentepohliales; Ulotrichales; Ulvales; incertae sedis: Blastophysa; Bubnoffphycos; Sporocladopsis; Trichophilus; Zygomitus

= Ulvophyceae =

Ulvophyceae Temporal range: 1000–0 Ma

Class of green algae

The Ulvophyceae or ulvophytes are a class of green algae, distinguished mainly on the basis of ultrastructural morphology, life cycle and molecular phylogenetic data. The sea lettuce, Ulva, belongs here. Other well-known members include Caulerpa, Codium, Acetabularia, Cladophora, Trentepohlia and Monostroma.

The Ulvophytes are diverse in their morphology and their habitat. Most are seaweeds such as those listed above. Others, such as Rhizoclonium, Pithophora and some species of Cladophora live in fresh water and in some areas are considered weeds.

== Morphology ==
Ulvophycean algae are diverse in morphology. The thalli are typically colonial (some are unicellular). A few taxa have flagella in their vegetative stage, such as Oltmannsiellopsis. Common forms include filaments (both unbranched and branched), tubular and blade-like thalli (such as in Ulva), and siphonous thalli. Siphonous thalli are composed of a single giant cell (siphon) with thousands of nuclei and chloroplasts.

The life cycle of members of the Ulvophyceae are similarly diverse. Species often reproduce asexually by forming aplanospores, akinetes or zoospores; zoospores have two or four flagella. Asexual reproduction may also occur through fragmentation of the thallus, where the pieces of the thallus grow into a new organism. Sexual reproduction is isogamous or anisogamous, and may be haplontic or diplohaplontic (i.e., involving an alternation of generations). In several taxa, the zygote exists as a small, microscopic dormant stage (also interpreted as a unicellular sporophyte) and is called the Codiolum phase.

=== Ultrastructure ===
The class Ulvophyceae was originally defined by K. R. Mattox and K. D. Stewart based on ultrastructural characters. These were: a counter-clockwise arrangement of the flagellar basal bodies, cytokinesis by furrowing, a closed persistent mitotic spindle, and the lack of a phycoplast. The cell wall composition and structure are highly variable, and in the flagellate life stages of some organisms, there is no cell wall altogether. The order Trentepohliales has a unique set of ultrastructural features (such as the presence of a phragmoplast), and was once considered to be its own separate class, the Trentepohliophyceae. Most of these ultrastructural characters are found in other lineages of algae, which has made defining Ulvophyceae difficult.

== Ecology ==
The Ulvophyceae are most diverse in marine habitats. A substantial number of species also live in brackish or freshwater habitats; in temperate regions they are typically most abundant during the spring and summer months. They may be found in still (e.g. lakes and ponds) or flowing waters (e.g. rivers and streams); they are typically attached to a substrate such as rocks, sediments, other aquatic algae, or occasionally animals like turtles or mollusc shells. Similarly, some species live in terrestrial habitats growing on soil, rocks, trees, plants, and other artificial substrates.

Ulvophycean algae are often beneficial to their habitats; for example, Cladophora has been described as an ecosystem engineer and provides a range of niches for other aquatic organisms. However, Cladophora and a few other taxa, such as Pithophora and Ulva often form nuisance blooms due to eutrophication.

Some species of ulvophytes are endosymbiotic within other algae, such as Ulvella which grows within other filamentous algae. Within the terrestrial order Trentepohliales, some taxa form symbioses with lichens as their phycobionts. Marine lichens also host some Ulvophyceae as symbionts; the diversity of these symbiotic algae is currently under-studied.

The family Trentepohliaceae is unusual in that it contains a few parasitic genera. For example, Cephaleuros is an endophyte within the leaves of vascular plants. Cephaleuros can cause significant economic damage to crop plants.

== Evolution ==
The origin and early diversification of the Ulvophyceae likely took place in the late Neoproterozoic, though may have taken place earlier, in the Mesoproterozoic. Although most contemporary ulvophytes are marine macroalgae (seaweeds), ancestral ulvophytes may have been freshwater, unicellular green algae. Molecular phylogenetic evidence suggests that macroscopic growth was achieved independently in the various major lineages of Ulvophyceae (Ulvales-Ulotrichales, Trentepohliales, Cladophorales, Bryopsidales and Dasycladales).

The fossil record of Ulvophyceae is generally sparse, as most algae do not biomineralize well. Nevertheless, some orders such as the Dasycladales and Bryopsidales have calcified thalli and a more extensive fossil record. The earliest known representative is the Cladophorales Proterocladus antiquus from the Mesoproterozoic-Neoproterozoic boundary in North China. However, its taxonomic placement is not certain.

Because Ulvophyceae lacks a consistent set of ultrastructural characteristics, its monophyly has been questioned. Molecular phylogenetic studies have found Ulvophyceae to be monophyletic, albeit without strong support. The internal relationships between the different clades is also unclear. Current hypothesis on relationships among the main clades of Ulvophyceae are shown below:

- - - Trentepohliales
    - - Cladophorales
      - Blastophysa (incertae sedis)
    - - Bryopsidales
      - Dasycladales
  - - - - - Ulotrichales
          - Acrosiphoniales
        - - Sykidiales
          - - Solotvyniales
            - - Ulvales
              - Chlorocystidales
      - Oltmannsiellopsidales
    - Ignatiales
    - Scotinosphaerales

== See also ==
- List of Ulvophyceae genera
