= Penicillus =

Penicillus may refer to:

- Penicillus (alga), a green alga genus in the family Udoteaceae
- Penicillus (bivalve), a mollusc genus in the family Clavagellidae
- Penicillus capitatus, a species of green algae

== See also ==
- Penicillin (disambiguation)
- Penicillium
