= Ethel Sarel Gepp =

British botanist (1864-1922)

- Born: August 21, 1862; Hampton Court Green, England
- Died: April 6, 1922 (aged 59); Torquay, England
- Other names: Ethel Sarel Barton
- Known for: work on genus Halimeda
- Spouse: Antony Gepp
- Scientific career
- Fields: Phycology
- Author abbrev. (botany): E. S. Barton

Ethel Sarel Gepp, also publishing as Ethel Sarel Barton (21 August 1864 – 6 April 1922), was a phycologist who specialized in the study of marine algae and is noted for her work reordering the genus Halimeda.

== Family ==
Ethel Sarel Barton was born at Hampton Court Green in England. Around 1872 the family moved to Sussex.

In 1904, she married Antony Gepp (1862-1955), a fellow marine botanist.

== Career ==
Gepp worked as a specimen collector for the Department of Botany at the British Museum (Natural History) and for Kew Gardens, and she contributed papers to the Journal of Botany, the Journal of the Linnaean Society, and other scientific publications under both her birth and married names. In 1900, she published the first of a number of papers on the macroalgae genus Halimeda, working with a collection of specimens that had been brought back from Funafuti Atoll in the South Pacific. This work convinced her of the need for serious reorganization of the genus, and that same year she was asked by fellow phycologist Anna Weber-van Bosse to work on another Halimeda collection, this one from the Siboga Expedition to the Dutch Indies. This led to her important monograph of 1901, The Genus Halimeda, which reduced the number of Halimeda species to 7 from more than two dozen. A contemporary review praised her thorough work on this genus, which "has been the despair of every phycologist for years".

Her solo-authored publications dropped off after her 1904 marriage, as she began collaborating with her husband. She died in Torquay after a long illness.

== Selected publications ==
Solo-authored

- "Systematic and Structural Account of the Genus Turbinaria, Lamx" (1891)
- "On Notheia anomala, Harv. et Bail." (1899)
- The Genus Halimeda (1901)
- "List of Marine Algae, with a Note on the Fructification of Halimeda" (1903)
- "Chinese Marine Algae" (1904)
- "The Sporangia of Halimeda"
- "Antarctic Algae" (1905)

with Antony Gepp

- "Rhipidosiphon and Callipsygma" (1904)
- "Some Cryptogams from Christmas Island" (1905)
- The Codiaceae of the Siboga Expedition (1911)
- "Marine Algae from the Kermadecs" (1911)
- Marine Algae of the Scottish National Antarctic Expedition (1912)
