= Tydemania =

Tydemania is the scientific name of two genera of organisms and may refer to:

- Tydemania (alga), a genus of algae in the family Udoteaceae
- Tydemania (fish), a genus of fishes in the family Triacanthodidae
