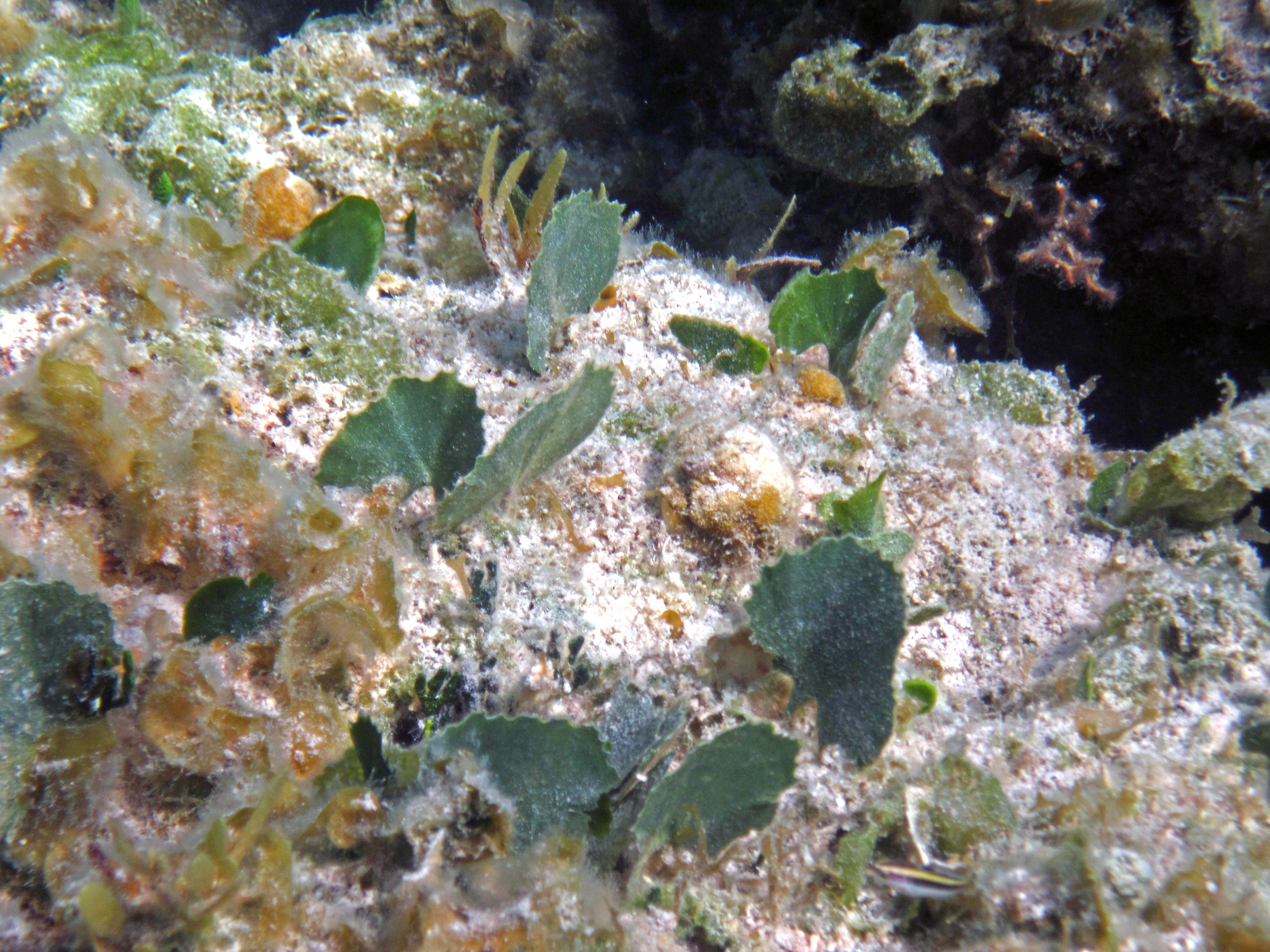
- A group of Udotea flabellum off the coast of the Bahamas

Scientific classification
- Kingdom: Plantae
- Division: Chlorophyta
- Class: Ulvophyceae
- Order: Bryopsidales
- Family: Udoteaceae
- Genus: Udotea
- Species: U. flabellum

Binomial name
- Udotea flabellum (J.Ellis & Solander) M.Howe

= Udotea flabellum =

Species of alga

Udotea flabellum is a species of photosynthetic macroalgae. It is commonly found in shallow waters around Florida and Belize in sandy areas, sea grass beds, and coral reefs. It is known for its antimicrobial properties and is also being used in cancer treatment studies.

== Description ==
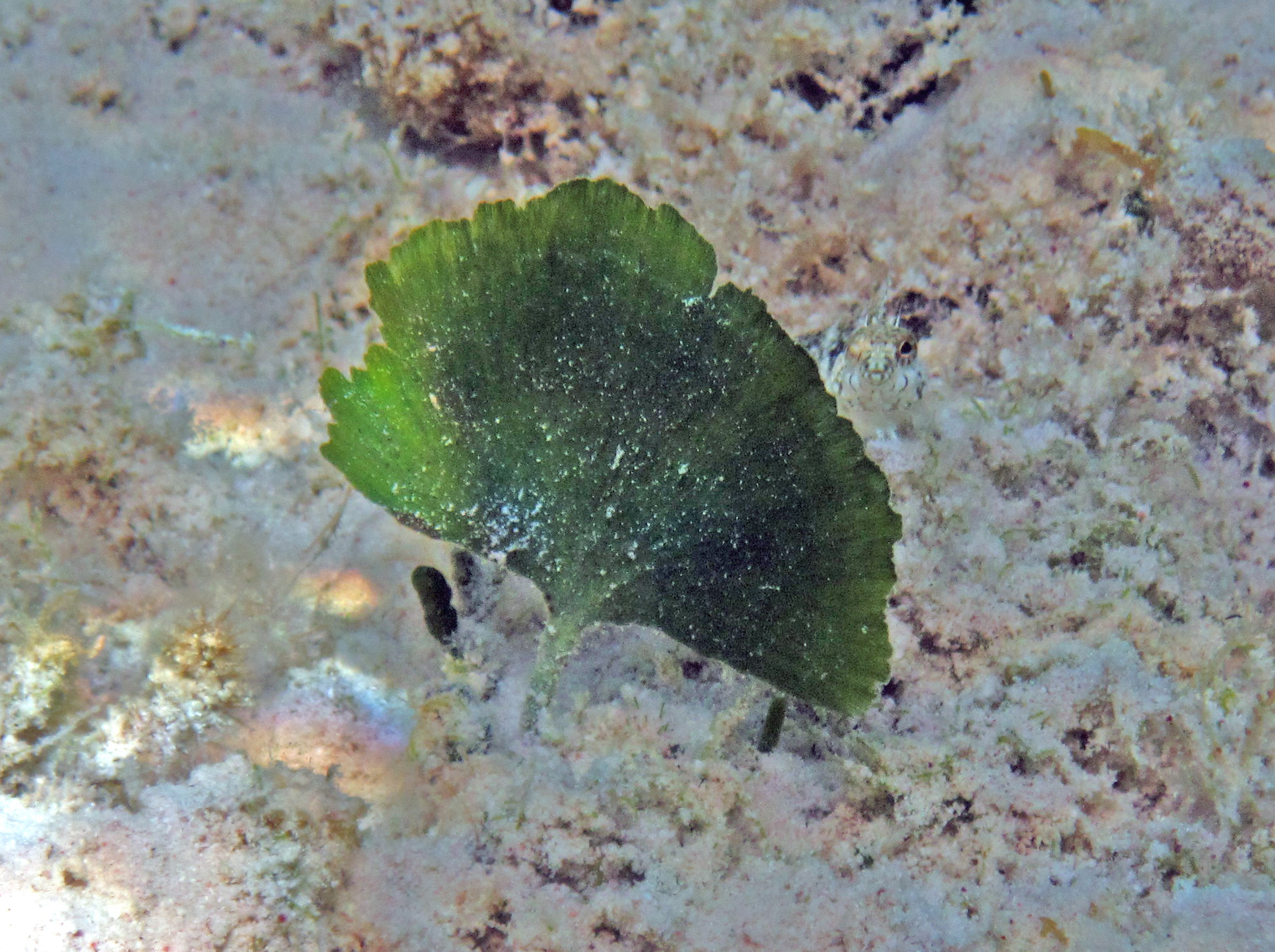
Udotea flabellum off the coast of the Bahamas.

Udotea flabellum is a green macroalgae. It attaches to the ground and has a thallus which grows in a fan shape, hence its nickname—mermaid's fan algae. The algae attaches to sand or mud with a system of rhizoids, root-like structures that form a hold fast. It lacks a stem, leaves, roots and a vascular system, but does have a stem-like feature called a stipe. The thallus is often lobed, and the lobes are thick, leathery, and moderately calcified. The stipe is also often calcified.

== Distribution and ecology ==
Species of the Udotea genus are found in tropical to subtropical locations. U. flabellum is found in waters of North America, the Atlantic islands, Mexico, the Caribbean, South America, the Indian Ocean, Africa, Australia, New Zealand and Asia. These algae are often found in coral reefs. They also grow on sandy coastlines and in sea grass beds. They can be found in depths of up to 23 meters. Since their thallus and stipe are calcified, when U. flabellum dies, it improves sediment nutrients and contributes to sediment production, which can help the reefs in the area to continue growing. Algae such as U. flabellum are also the base of reef food webs. The photosynthetic plants contribute to primary production, which is the synthesis of organic compounds, mainly carbohydrates in algae, from carbon dioxide. U. flabellum provides a food source for marine herbivores.

== Research ==
In one in vitro study, an extract of Udotea flabellum was found to be most effective out of a number of tropical green seaweeds tested, in increasing plasma coagulation time.

An extract of U. flabellum in ethanol has shown modest antimicrobial activity against Staphylococcus aureus and Candida albicans in one in vitro experiment. The researchers isolated the hydrates of a novel compound, which they named udoteatrial, from the algae extract, which they believed to be responsible the antimicrobial activity.
