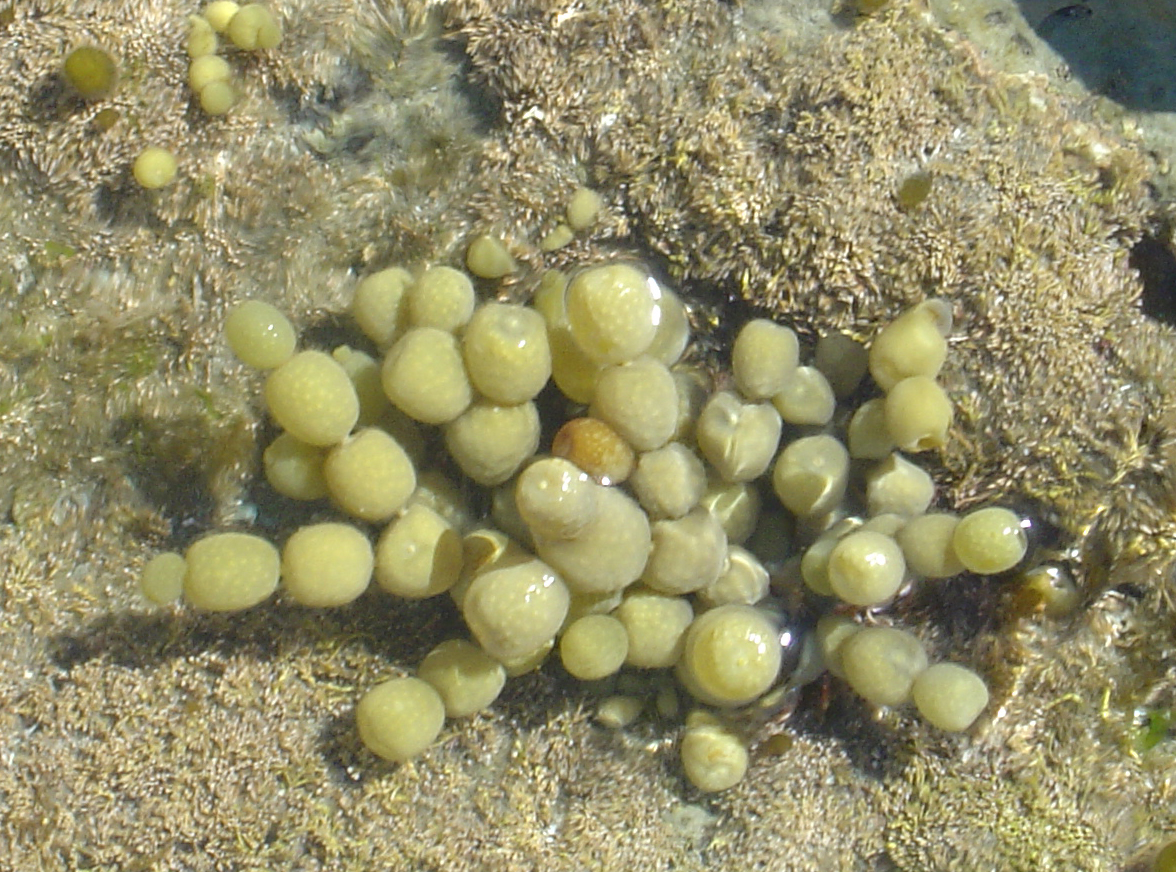
- Young Hormosira

Scientific classification
- Domain: Eukaryota
- Clade: Sar
- Clade: Stramenopiles
- Division: Ochrophyta
- Class: Phaeophyceae
- Order: Fucales
- Family: Hormosiraceae; Fritsch
- Genus: Hormosira (Endlicher) Menegh.
- Species: H. banksii

Binomial name
- Hormosira banksii (Turner) Dcne.

= Hormosira =

Species of Phaeophyceae

Hormosira is a genus of seaweed in the family Hormosiraceae. It is monotypic, with a single species, Hormosira banksii, also known as Neptune's necklace, Neptune's pearls, sea grapes, or bubbleweed. It is native to Australia and New Zealand.

== Distribution ==
Hormosira is native to southeastern Australia (including Tasmania, Lord Howe Island and Norfolk Island) and New Zealand. Despite substantial morphological variation across its range, the species represents a single species and the genus Hormosira is monotypic. Genetic analyses of mitochondrial COI and microsatellite DNA sequence data have indicated that there is low genetic variation across the range of the species in Australia.

== Description ==
Hormosira is a perennial species of seaweed (brown algae, Fucales). It is abundant on low-energy rocky reefs within the intertidal zone, where it outcompetes other algal species due to its high tolerance to desiccation. Plants vary significantly in morphology. The thallus (or frond) of the species is made up of strings of olive-brown, spherical, gas-filled pneumatocysts (or beads), which taper towards a small holdfast. While the holdfast attaches strongly to a substrate, it can be easily dislodged by human trampling. The spheres are buoyant and rise to the surface of the water during high tide, allowing plants to move with the flow of the current and obtain more sunlight. Hormosira also produces a slime layer to reduce desiccation, and plants often grows in high densities, which reduces their surface area exposed to the sun and further reduce dehydration. Due to the buoyant thallus, Hormosira plants can drift out to sea over considerable distances, and floating plants can remain fertile for several weeks.

Hormosira seaweed
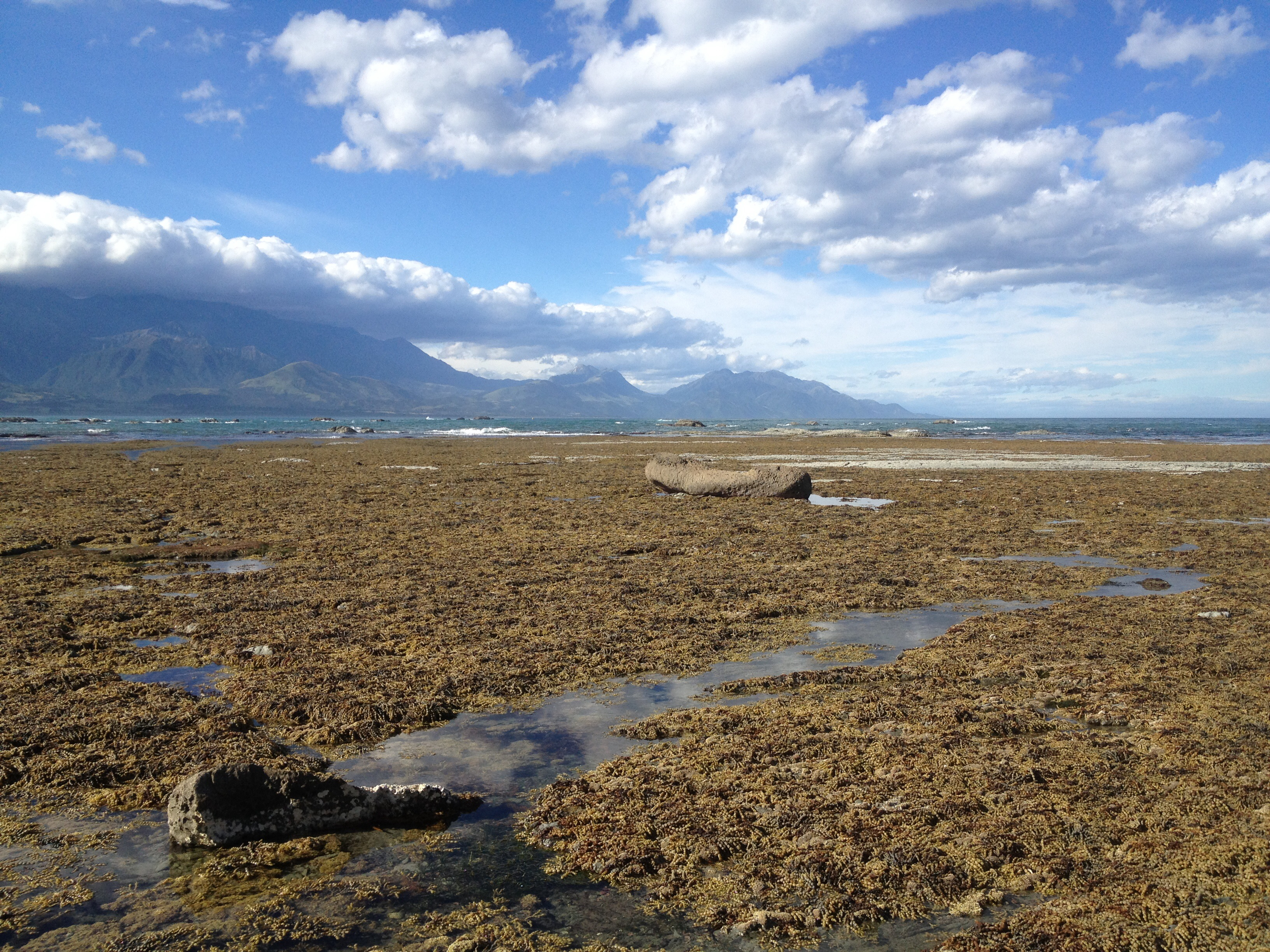
High densities of Hormosira on a broad rocky platform in Kaikoura, New Zealand

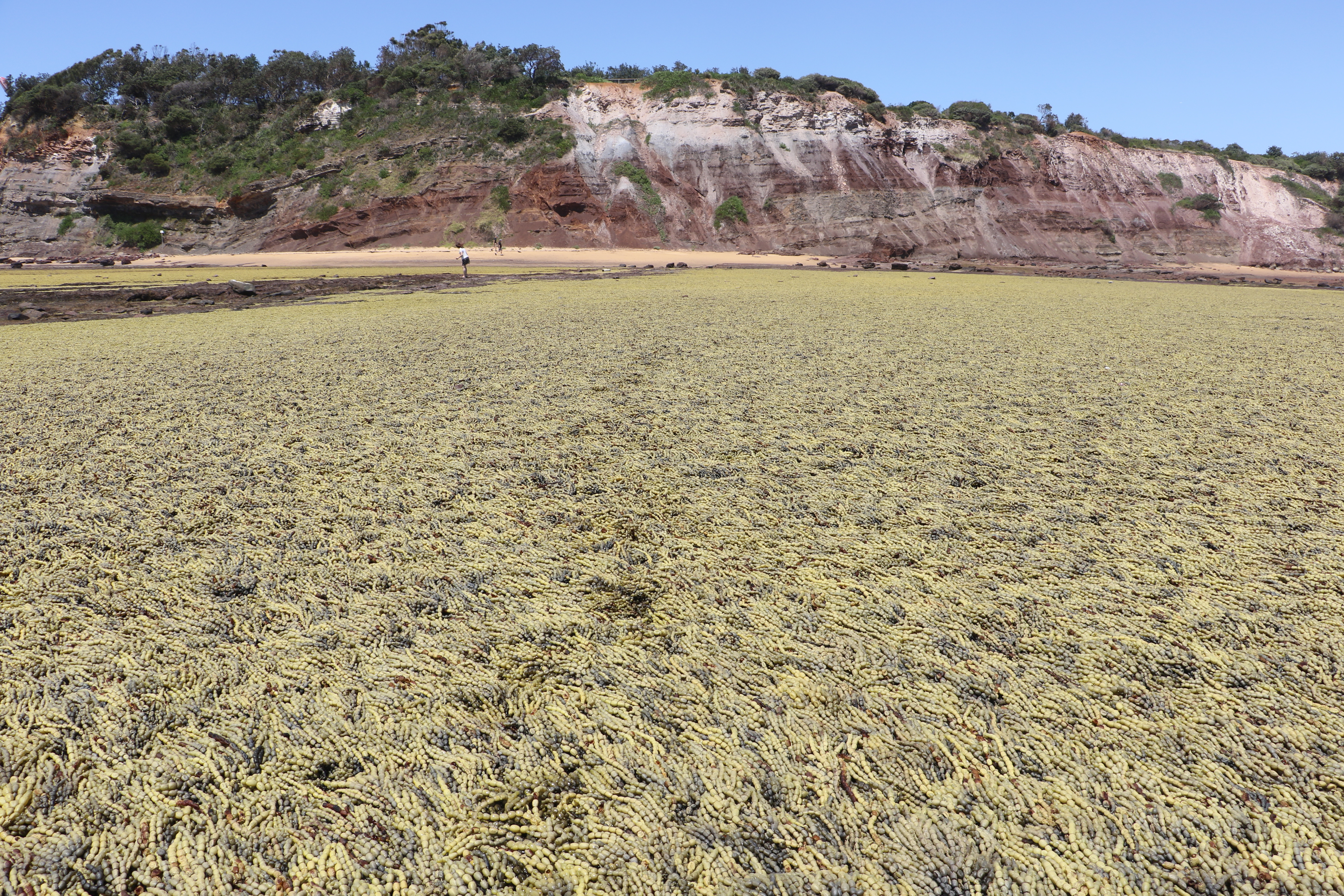
High densities of Hormosira at Long Reef, Sydney, Australia

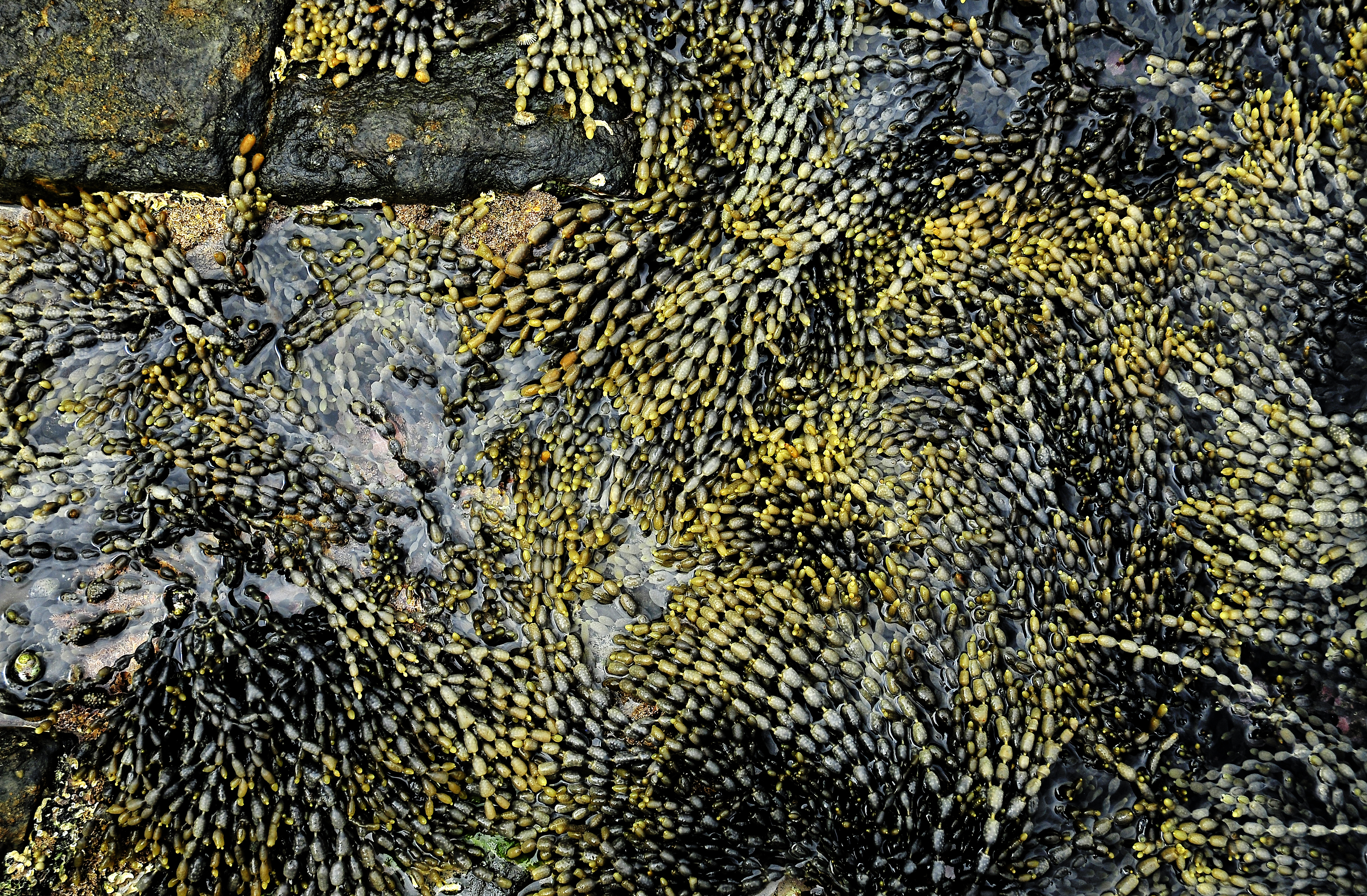
Hormosira at Eaglehawk Neck, Tasmania, Australia

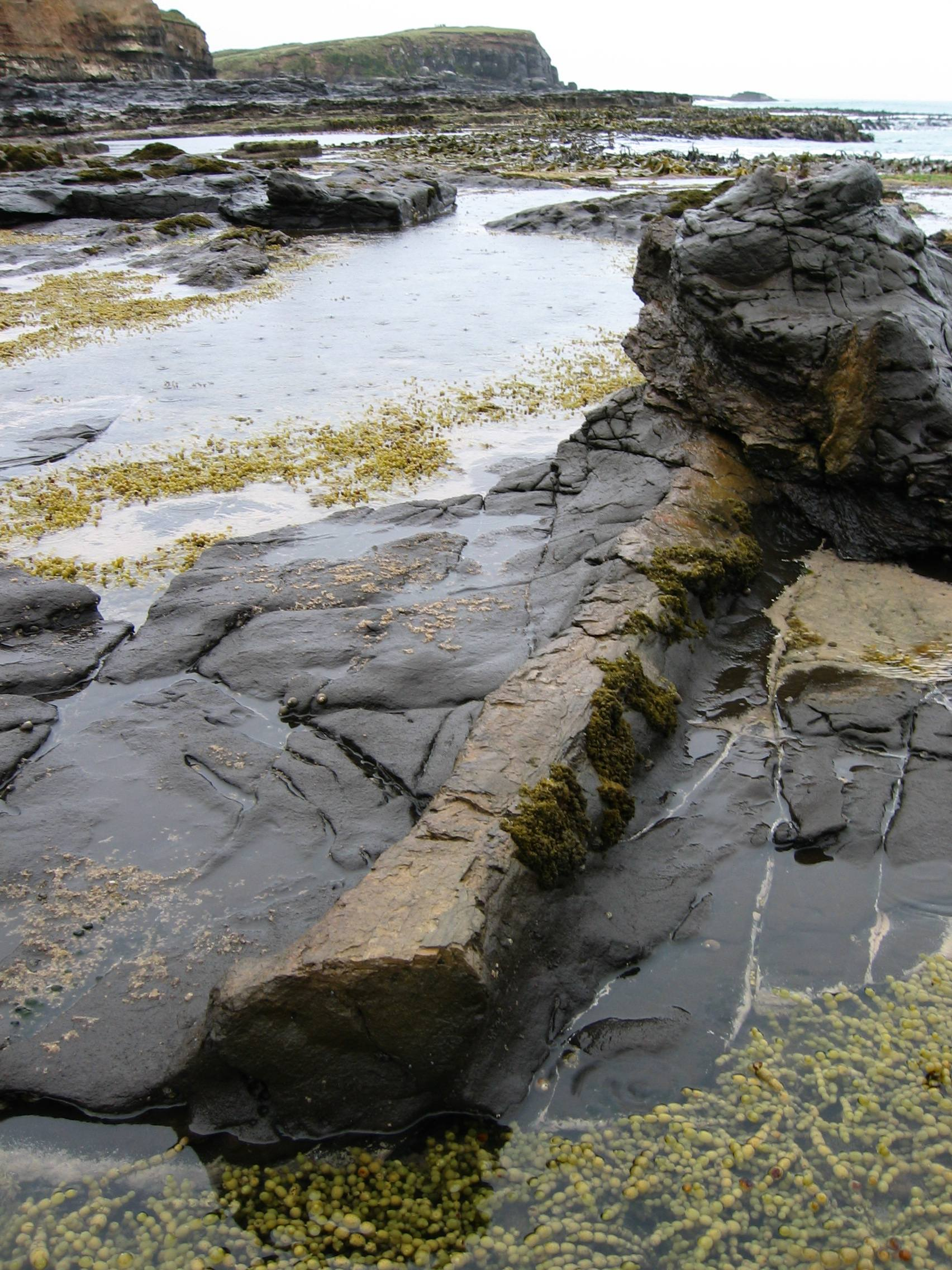
Hormosira growing alongside a petrified log at Curio Bay, Otago, New Zealand

== Reproduction ==
Hormosira reproduces sexually and is monoecious. The sex organs (conceptacles) are on the surface of the beads, and are visible to the naked eye as rough-looking dimples. Hormosira produces eggs throughout the year, but its peak reproduction is often confined to July–October (at least in northern New Zealand) when the sea temperature is around 14 °C, as the viability of the eggs can be low in high sea temperatures such as 17–22 °C. At high tide, the eggs are released directly into the surrounding water. The eggs are negatively buoyant they sink to the substrate to develop for several days before becoming attached. All individuals release at the same time, maximising fertilisation. The species can also reproduce asexually from broken and dislodged fragments.

Hormosira reproduction
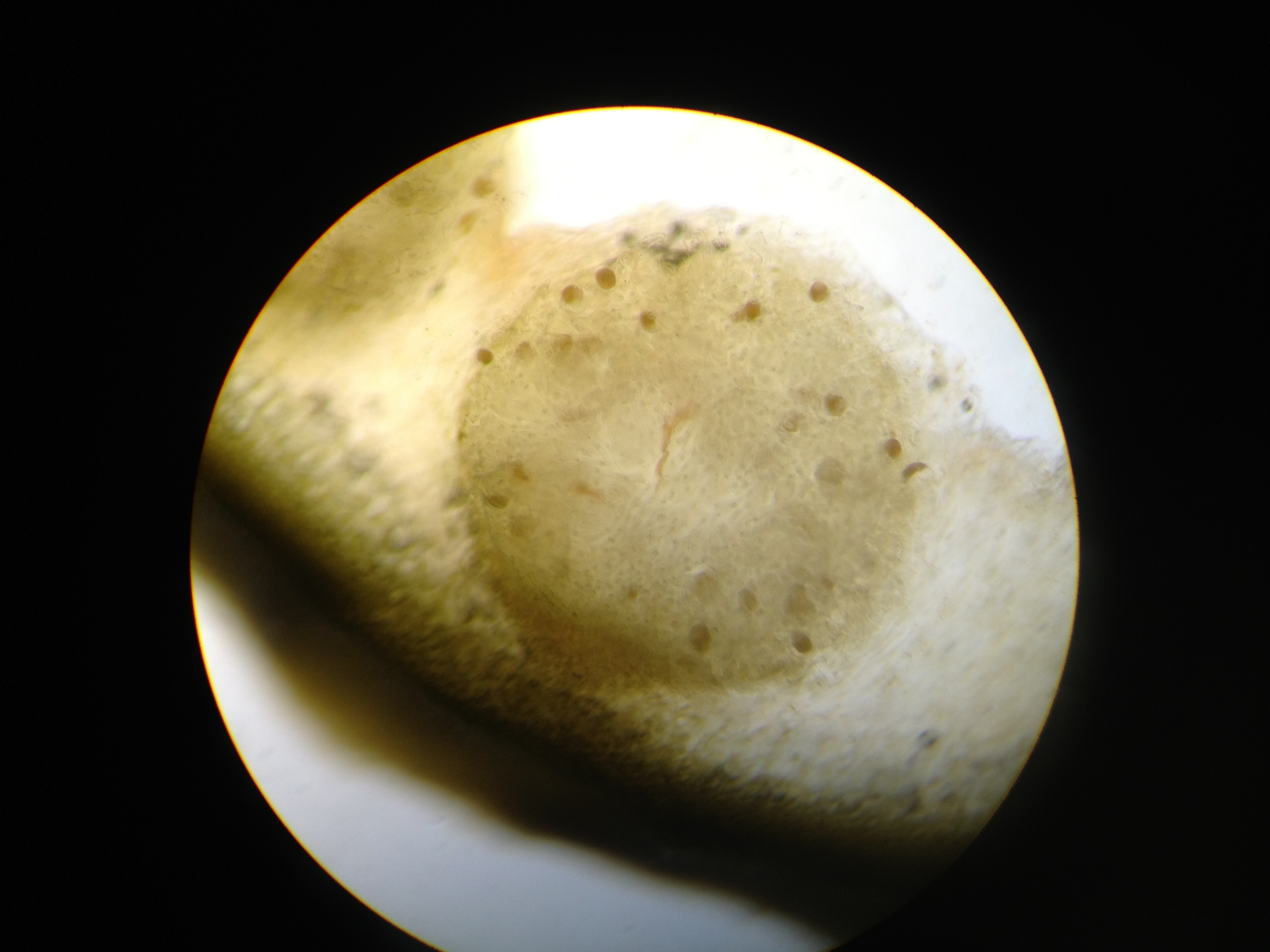
Female conceptacle

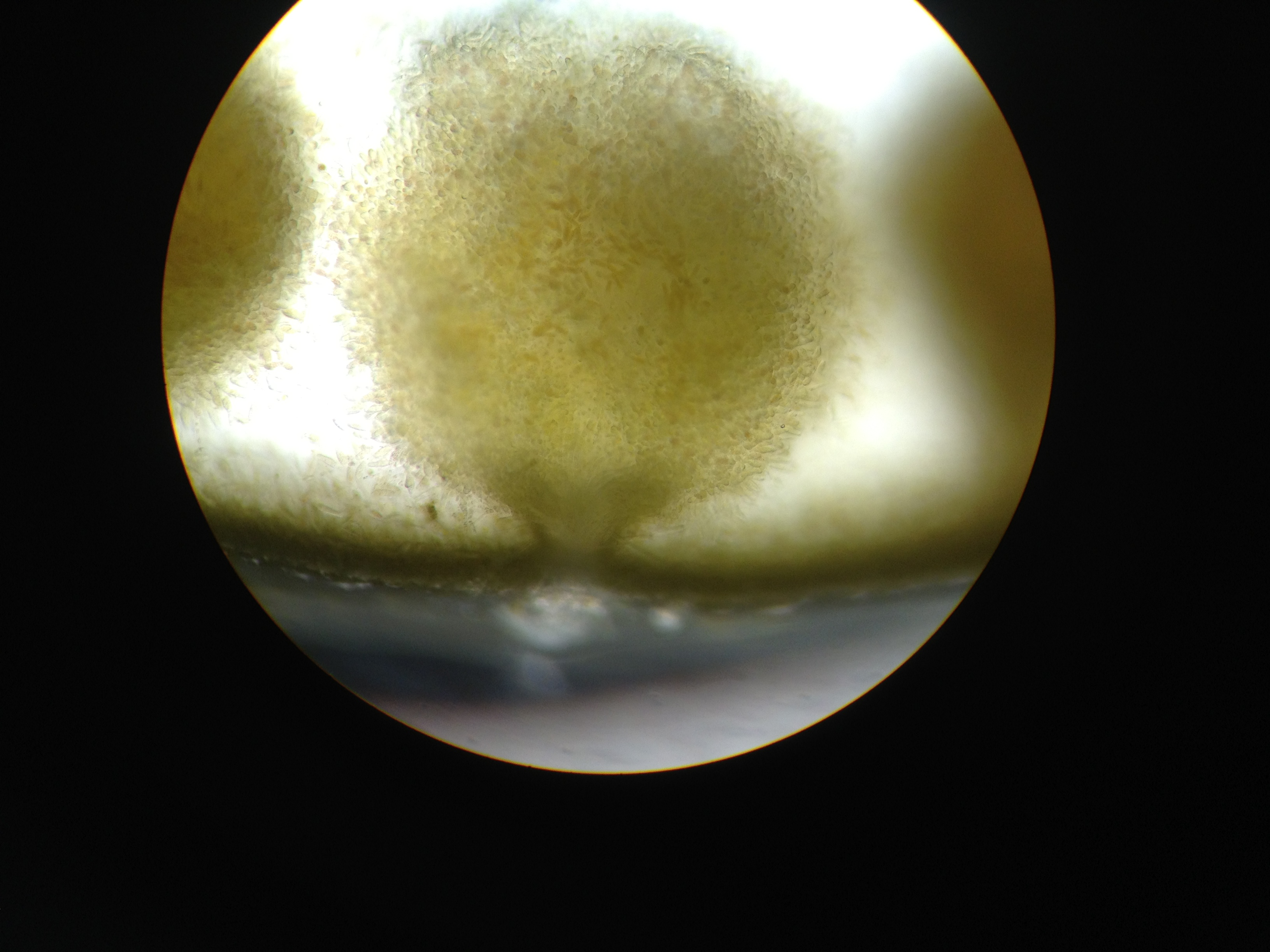
Male conceptacle

== Ecology ==
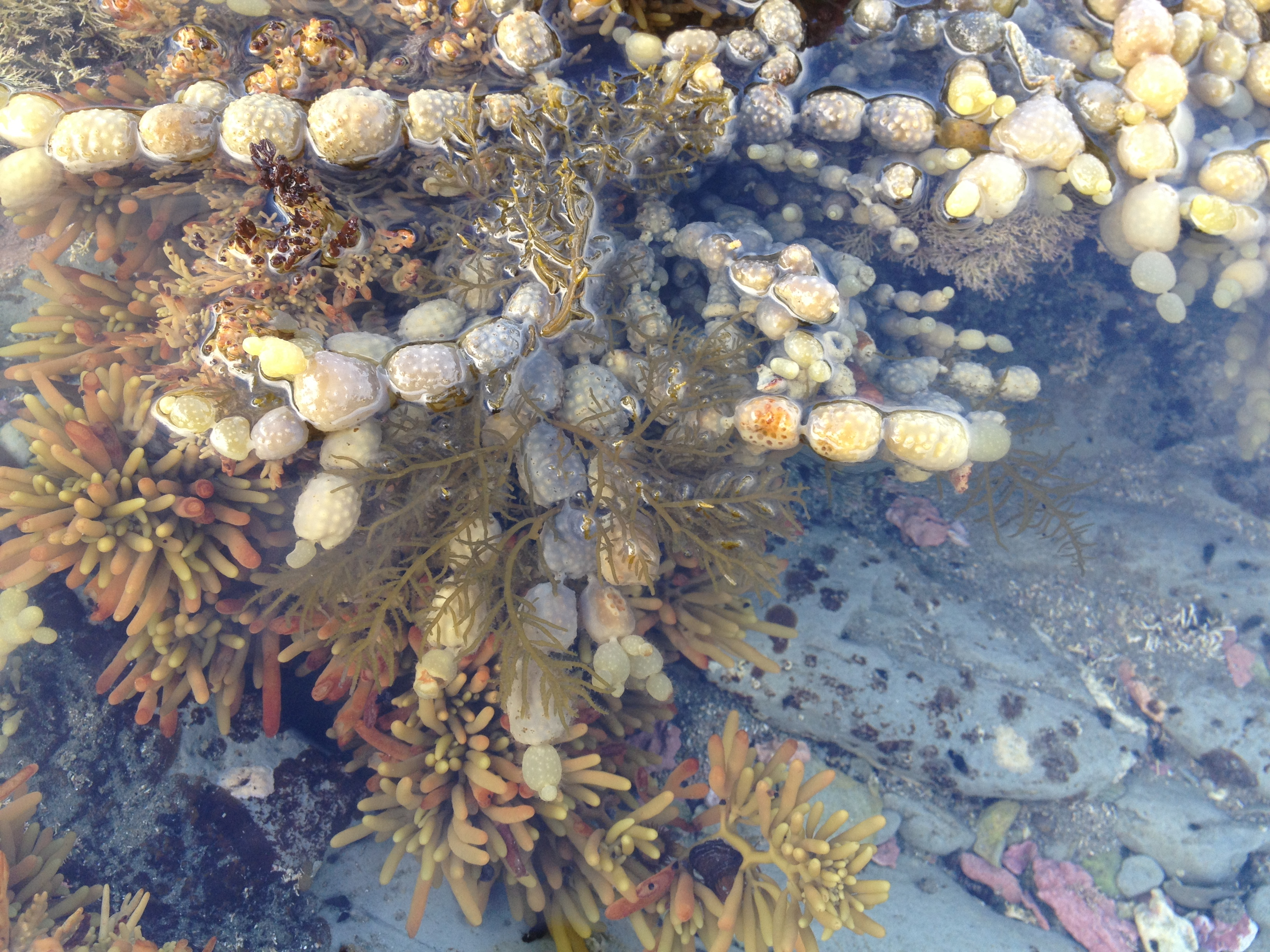
Hormosira provides habitat for this obligate epiphyte, Notheia anomala.

Hormosira is regarded as an ecosystem engineer or habitat former that occurs in large patches and outcompetes other algal species due to its high tolerance to desiccation. Hormosira is a food source for sea urchins, many small crustaceans, and some juvenile fish. Young crustaceans and molluscs often rely on the dense canopies of Hormosira for niche space, protection from predators, and avoid desiccation at low tide. Hormosira provides a substrate for sessile organisms to attach onto, including sea urchins and a wide range of facultative and obligate algal epiphytes such as Notheia anomala. This is beneficial to many organisms as competition for habitat space is a primary limiting factor in the intertidal environment.

== Uses ==
Due to the species' high iodine content, Tasmanian schoolchildren were once urged to eat a bead a day to keep the goitres away.
