= Penicillus capitatus =

Scientific classification
- Domain: Eukaryota
- Clade: Archaeplastida
- Clade: Viridiplantae
- Division: Chlorophyta
- Class: Ulvophyceae
- Order: Bryopsidales
- Family: Udoteaceae
- Genus: Penicillus
- Species: P. capitatus

Binomial name
- Penicillus capitatus Lamarck

Species of alga

Penicillus capitatus is a species of macroalgae, seaweed, that is part of the Udoteaceae, a larger family of algae. P. capitatus is a member of green macroalgae, Chlorophyta, so they share some similarities to their terrestrial counterparts. Due to their distinct shape, the Penicillus genus can be referred to as Brush Seaweed, Shaving Brush, or the Mermaid's Shaving Brush.

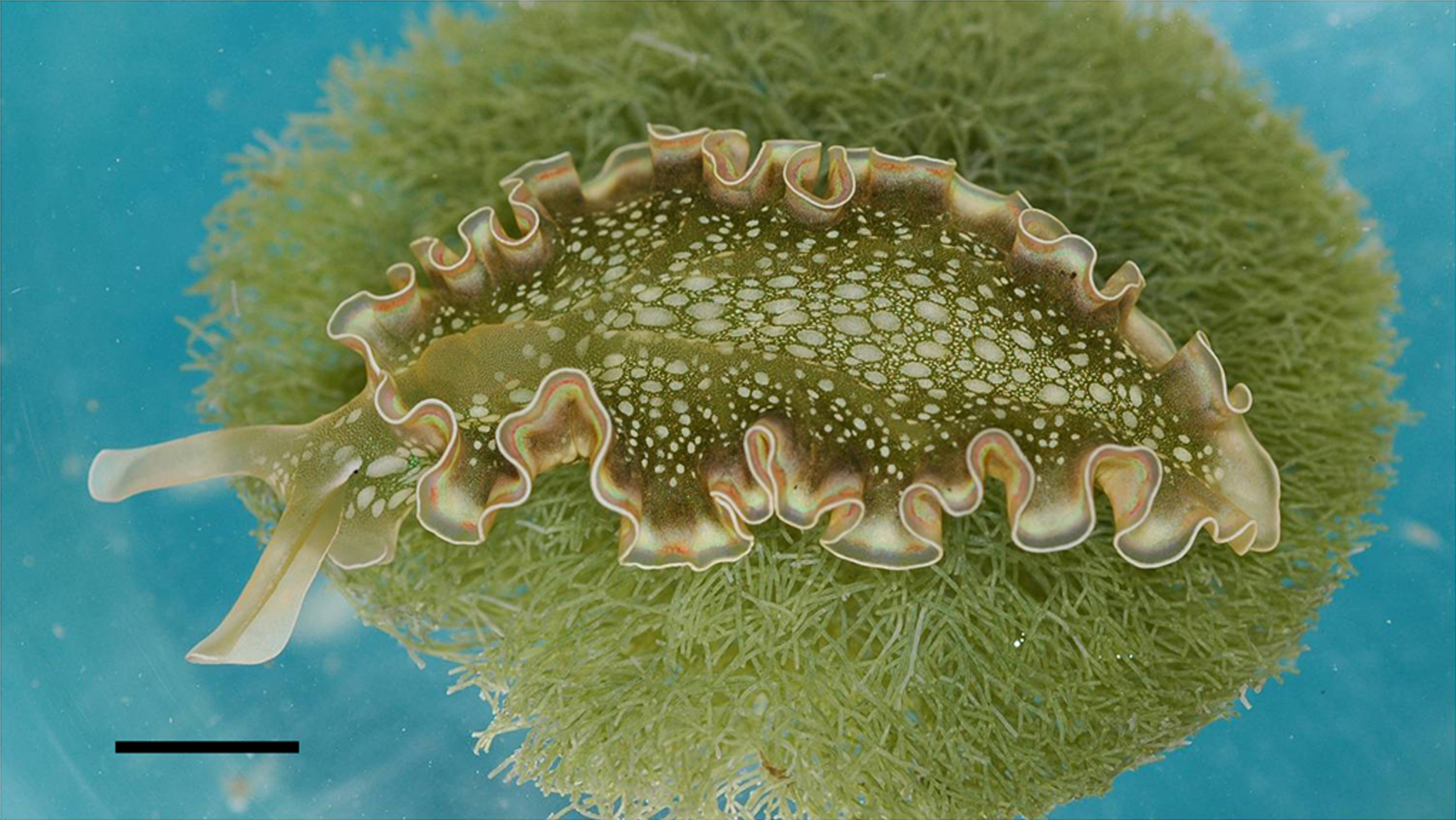
Elysia clarki on its algal food source Penicillus capitatus. The scale bar is 5 mm.

== Description ==
Penicillus capitatus is green in color, and vertically protrudes from the surface they grow on. It uses rhizoids, a type of root hair that aids in adhesion and the transport of water, as a holdfast in order to stabilize itself on the surface that it is actively growing from. Average lengths of the P. capitatus can vary; younger, smaller samples tend to be around 5 cm, while fully mature ones can be measured at 15 cm.

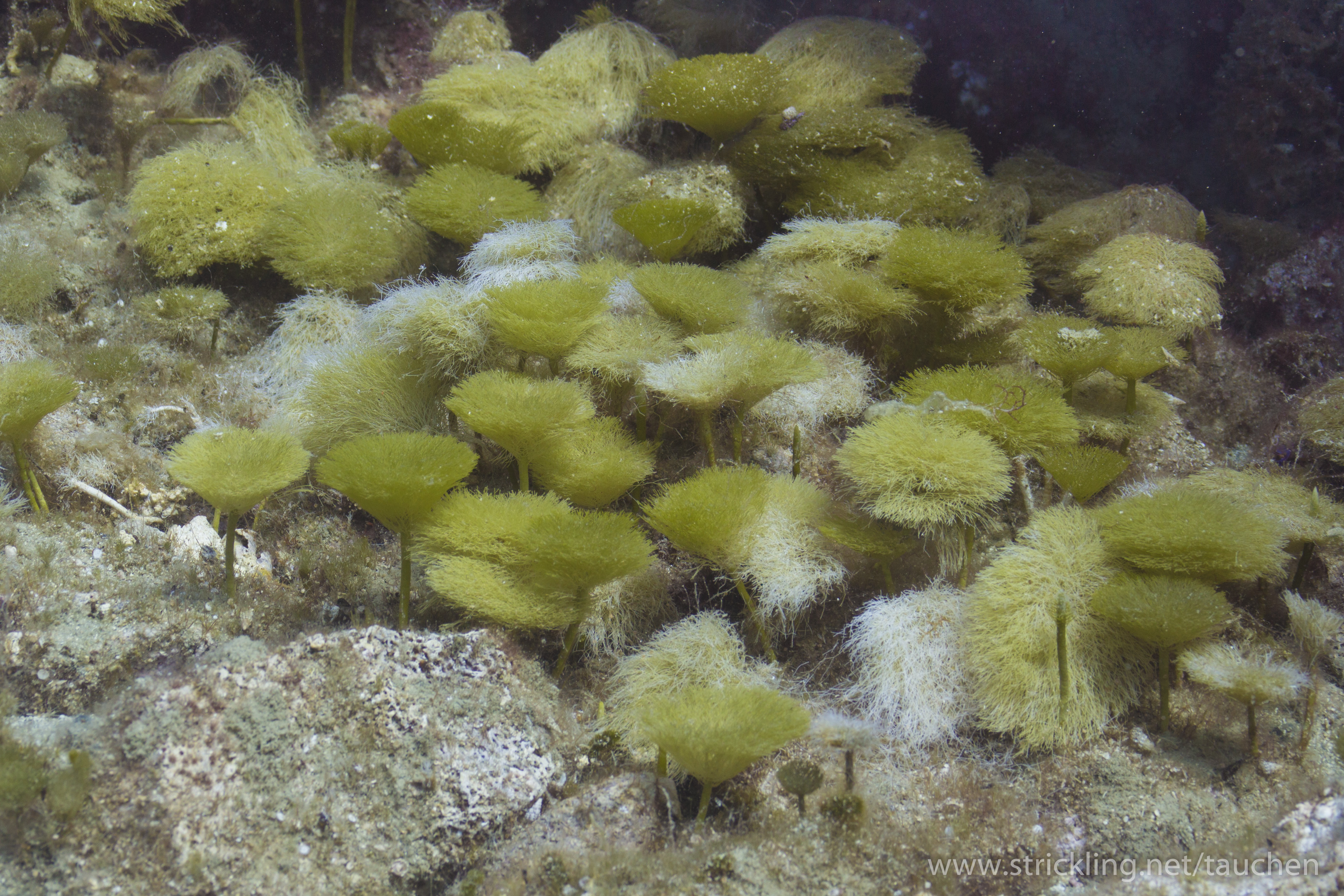
Algae Penicillus capitatus

This species of macroalgae are capitate, which means that the longer stipe grows into a much wider capitulum. The diameter of the top can range from 5 to 8 centimeters. This section of the seaweed contains smaller offshoots that make up the brush. The organism also produces calcium carbonate, however this only occurs along the cap and is absent from the stipe and other areas. The calcium carbonate then creates a semi-hardened exterior on their cap and along the brush, which aids in providing shelter and nutrients to nearby organisms.

=== Cellular make up ===
P. capitatus is a coenocytic macroalgae. Unlike other plants or various other forms of seaweed that have a cell wall around each and every cell, capitatus does not. Whenever the cells in this seaweed go through mitosis, there are no partitions between the cells formed, which means that the inside is a mixture of different nuclei as well as the separate organelles that were produced in each cell. This would then classify the Penicillus capitatus as a unicellular, multinucleated organism since there are no cell walls to make it multicellular.

Due to the fact that Penicillus capitatus is a unicellular organism, this would mean that it is also siphonous. Since cytokinesis does not occur during cell division, the stipe of these organisms has long tubes that go up to the very top of the macroalgae. These segments of the stem are lined with the cytosol and the organelles of the giant cell.

=== Life cycle ===
The way that the Penicillus capitatus reproduces varies among each organism. The seaweed can reproduce asexually as well as sexually. Asexually, these organisms can reproduce by fragmentation. This is done when the P. capitatus breaks into various little pieces and uses currents in order to disperse identical copies of themselves. Early sections of the stipe are produced closer to the bottom of the organism and are swiftly whisked away to grow in other areas. Sexually, the macroalgae can also reproduce by spreading gametes from non-calcified areas of the capitulum, although this has not been closely observed.

The lifespan of the Penicillus capitatus has been under debate for quite some time. Some studies claim that an average life cycle can be as short as 45 days. On the other hand, opposing researchers concluded that on average the life cycle is 8 weeks, with some living for almost twice as long.

== Taxonomy ==
=== History ===
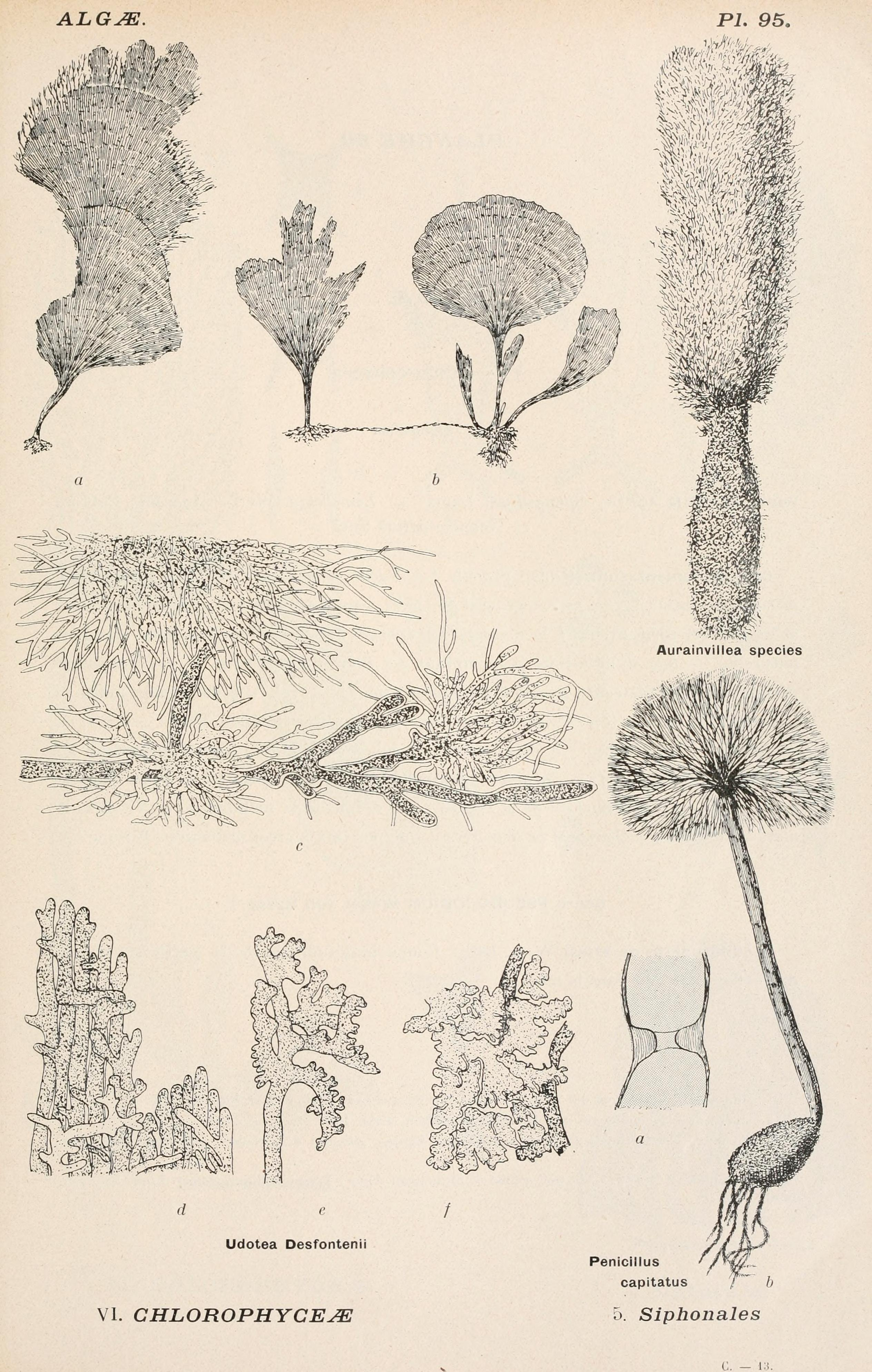
Early Diagram of the Penicillus macroalgae

The Penicillus capitatus was first observed by the Swedish botanist, Carl Linnaeus, in his publication dating back to 1758. His findings were recorded in the encyclopedia, Systema Naturae. Unfortunately, the description of this organism was not as fully developed, and the subject was overlooked in the publication. However, at the beginning of the 19th century, there was a fair bit more attention put on fully describing and observing the macroalgae.

Naturalist Jean-Baptiste Lamarck prominently recorded his findings regarding the P. capitatus. So much so that the lectotype name of the seaweed is Penecillus capitatus Lamarck.

=== Etymology ===
The term “Penicillus” is derived from the Latin word, "Penicillium”, which roughly translates to a "painter's brush". Similarly to a painter's brush, the P. capitatus has a very thin stipe and shoots out upwards like the tufts on a brush. The latter half of the scientific name is derived from the Latin word “capitatus”, referring to the seaweed having a compressed head. It was previously mentioned that a unique feature of the P. capitatus is that it is capitate, as it has a larger, compact top.

== Distribution and habitat ==
The Penicillus capitatus is found closer to the equator, in more tropical climates. They are most abundant in the Gulf of Mexico and the Caribbean. While not as common as in the Gulf and Caribbean, these organisms can be found on the Eastern Coast of South America. They have also been recorded in the Mediterranean (where Lamarck originally recorded his observations of the macroalgae) as well as on the eastern coast of Australia.

The Penicillus capitatus develops in shallower, warmer water that is exposed to sunlight. This is due to them being thermophilic organisms, as they prefer to live in hotter areas. These organisms have been found to be located in the neritic zones (very close to the shore) where the depths they comfortably reside in goes down to about 2 meters in depth. While not much has been recorded regarding interactions with other facets of the ecosystem, Linnaeus' early recordings of the seaweed described it being a food source for sea turtles.

These organisms are extremely important photosynthesizers in the estuary and lagoon environments. P. capitatus are brackish so they require very mild salinity in their habitat, so they only occur and thrive within these specific salinity levels throughout these areas. Within these areas, they spread to create meadows and ultimately provide many resources and shelter for the organisms around them.

P. capitatus also occurs within mangrove forests and remains in very shallow waters. In these habitats, the macroalgae tend to live with the local Thallasia, more commonly referred to as turtle grass. While not as common, they appear within coral reefs as well.

== Scientific uses ==
The P. capitatus has been used across several academic studies and research papers throughout the latter half of the 20th century. One of the more significant experiments and papers arose from a 1985 study conducted by Allan Stoner. In this piece, he explored the relationships between the seaweed and various smaller organisms, like crabs, that would inhabit the sea brush, and how various factors affected the immigration rates of the creatures. In 1992 Karen McGlarthy conducted experiments that connected P. capitatus’ decrease of nutrient uptake within various parts of Bermuda to be associated with the seagrass that inhabited the surrounding areas. More recently, scientists in the Mediterranean studied how invasive species affect productivity and vitality of the macroalgae.
