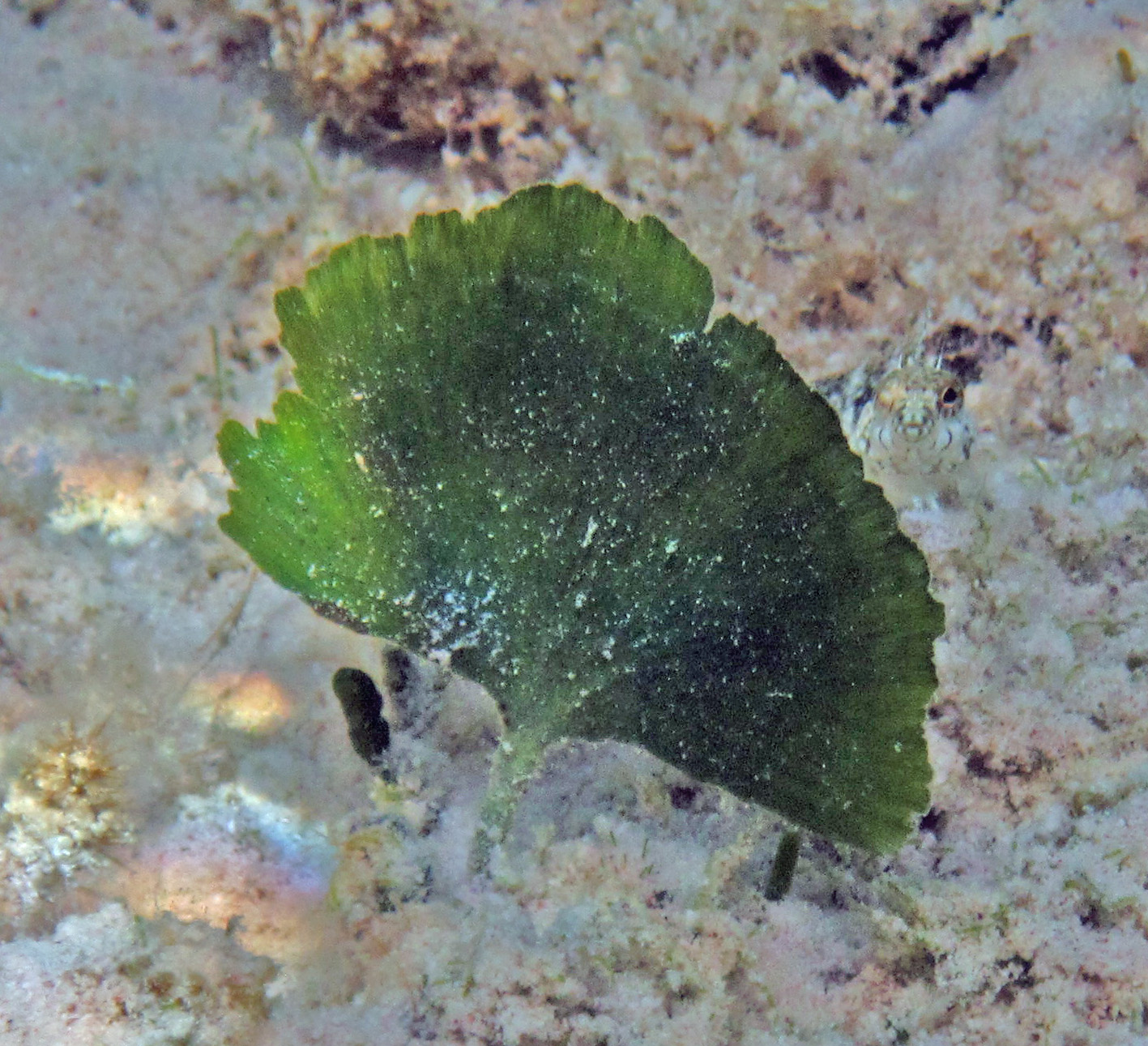
- Udotea flabellum (mermaid's fan alga), San Salvador Island, Bahamas

Scientific classification
- Kingdom: Plantae
- Division: Chlorophyta
- Class: Ulvophyceae
- Order: Bryopsidales
- Family: Udoteaceae
- Genus: Udotea; J.V. Lamouroux, 1812

Type species
- Udotea flabellata

Species
- U. abbottiorum; U. argentea; U. caribaea; U. conglutinata; U. cyathiformis; U. dixonii; U. dotyi; U. fibrosa; U. flabellum; U. fragilifolia; U. geppiorum; U. glaucescens; U. goreaui; U. halimeda; U. indica; U. kuetzingii; U. looensis; U. luna; U. norrisii; U. occidentalis; U. orientalis; U. palmetta; U. papillosa; U. reniformiis; U. spinulosa; U. tenax; U. tenuifolia; U. unistratea; U. velutina; U. verticillosa; U. wilsonii; U. xishaensis; U. yamadae

= Udotea =

Genus of algae

Udotea is a genus of green algae in the family Udoteaceae.

== Taxonomy and nomenclature ==
Udoteaceae are generally described based on vegetative characters of fully-developed thalli. Most species of Udotea tend to have blades that are single or multiple layers with branching siphons attaching to adjacent siphons. In some species, a characteristic similar to Udoteacean genera are observed such as small protuberances or attachments on the sides of the blades.

An issue on monophyly may arise among Udotean species as some exhibit similar blade characteristics of other genera such as Flabellia and Halimeda. In some, blades lacking cortex, appearing as a brush may resemble Rhipocephalus, Rhipidosiphon, Rhipiliopsis, or Tydemania.

== Morphology ==
The Udoteaceae (Bryopsidales, Chlorophyta) consists of multinucleated green macroalgae found in tropical regions. Udotea is described to have an erect thalli that is coenocytic with three main parts: an uncalcified rhizoid that serves as an anchor to different substrates (e.g. rock, sand, mud); an uncalcified upright stalk with a cortex, also known as its stipe; and a fan-shaped calcified thalli. Stalks are composed of siphons positioned lengthwise, with appendages located near the sides forming a cortex. Lateral appendages are siphons located on the blade, which are either simple or complex in nature.

Siphon morphology typically relies on the thallus location and Udotea life-history stage. Mature thalli are often characterized to have simple to complex filaments that are siphonaceous.

== Distribution ==
Siphonous green macroalgae belonging to Bryopsidales are widely distributed in most tropical regions. In the Western Atlantic Ocean, 21 Udotea species were noted by Littler & Littler in 1990. In 2017, Wynne subsequently identified 23 infrageneric taxa in the Western Atlantic, both in tropical and subtropical regions. Udotea species are commonly found near the shore in tropical regions inhabiting seagrass areas up to 50 m in depth and grows from 8 – 20 cm in length.

== Ecology ==
Udotea have rhizoids serving as an anchor in attaching to substrate, mostly in the sediment while previous studies have also shown that Udotea are also involved in the formation of seagrasses. Upon its death, the sediment benefits through its calcified thalli, producing sand, organic compounds, contributing to reef building and improving the sediment as it decomposes.

Apart from being primary producers, Udotea can be found co-inhabit with other marine macroalga from Udoteaceae wherein their presence are useful in seeking refuge, providing food, and calcium carbonate.

== Life history ==
Fertile thalli can easily be distinguished within the genera, especially among species with specialized gametangia, but most are identified through thalli color changes (e.g. U. flabellum). Male plants turn green while females are grey in thallus color. Udotea thalli often remain in the marine environment longer than other genera after reproduction, sometimes with its blade intact, for months (e.g. U. flabellum).

Gametangia is located in the terminal blade in Udotea. For U. flabellum, the release of its gametes is quick and noticeable. Both plant sexes are described to have biflagellated gametes, macro and micro similar to Halimeda and Caulerpa. Other species of Udotea produce gametes that are sphere-shaped, resembling the gametes of Penicillus and Rhipocephalus.

== Cultivation and exploitation ==
Currently, Udotea is not being cultivated for aquaculture research.

== Chemical composition ==
Some of the extracts isolated from Udotea are Mannose and Glucose, identified as biocompounds that are SP-rich. In a recent study, anti-coagulant sulfated polysaccharide-rich extracts were extracted from Udotea flabellum, specifically, sulfated homogalactans, F-I and F-II. Anticoagulant and anti-proliferative properties of these compounds were found to be potent in the species, which may have the potential for future research pertaining on its effects.

== Utilization and management ==
Various species of Udotea have been found to produce numerous bioactive compounds, specifically diterpenesm including udoteal which functions as a deterrent against an herbivorous fish Eupomacentrus leucostictus and udoteal B which has an antibiotic activity, limiting cell division on sea urchin egg upon fertilization and exhibits harmful effects on damselfish. In addition, lectins petiodial, and udoteafuran have been isolated in some species, which have several biological properties causing toxicity in some fish, as deterrent, and antimicrobial, antiviral, anticoagulant and antitumor potential.
