= Pseudopenicillus =

Scientific classification
- Clade: Viridiplantae
- Division: Chlorophyta
- Class: Ulvophyceae
- Order: Bryopsidales
- Family: Udoteaceae
- Genus: Pseudopenicillus; O. Dragastan et al., 1997

Type species
- Pseudopenicillus aegaeicus

Species
- Pseudopenicillus aegaeicus

Genus of green algae

Pseudopenicillus is a genus of green algae in the family Udoteaceae.
