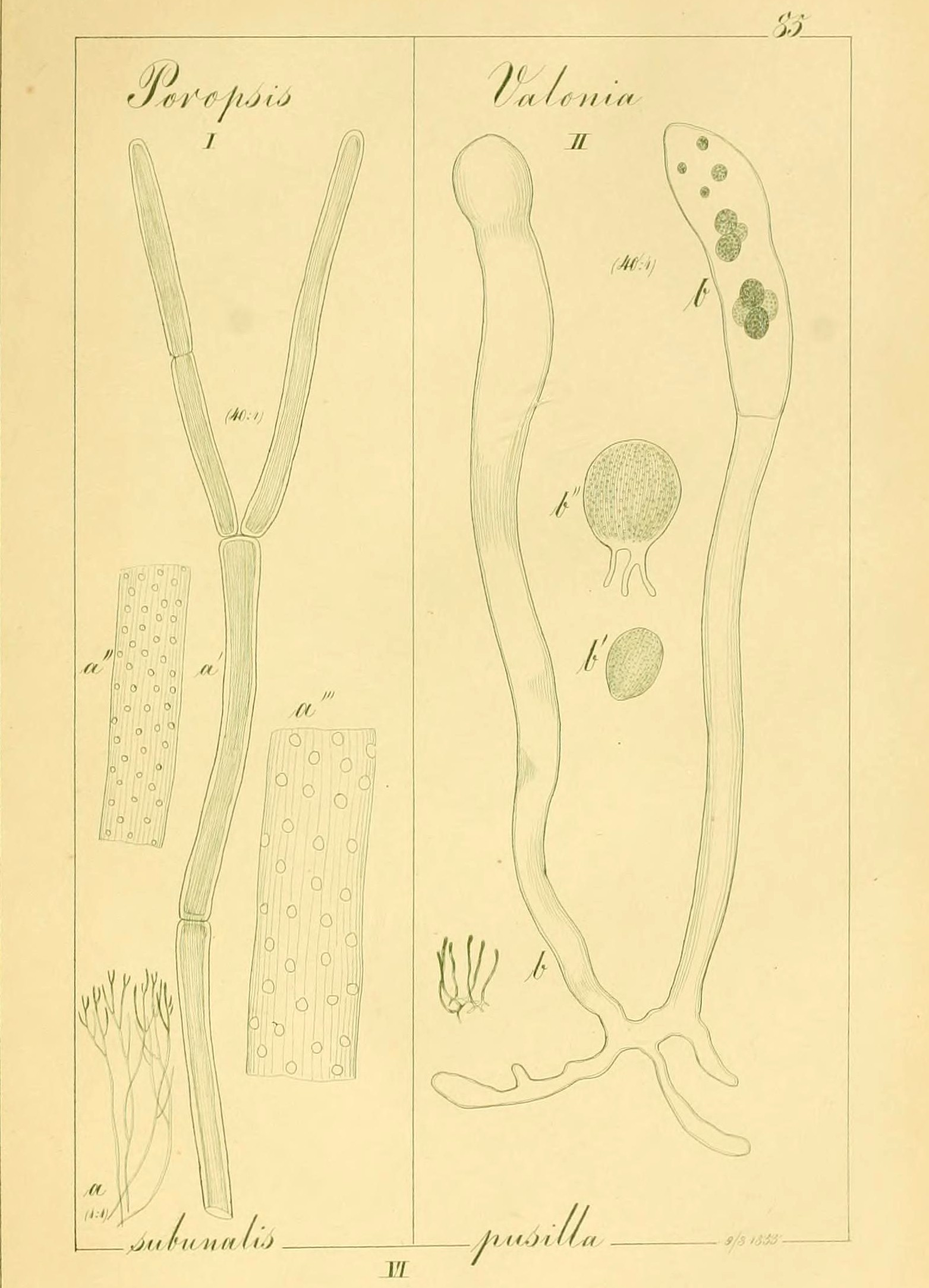
- Poropsis subunalis

Scientific classification
- Clade: Viridiplantae
- Division: Chlorophyta
- Class: Ulvophyceae
- Order: Bryopsidales
- Family: Udoteaceae
- Genus: Poropsis; Kützing, 1856

Type species
- Poropsis subunalis

Species
- Poropsis subunalis

= Poropsis =

Genus of algae

Poropsis is a genus of green algae in the family Udoteaceae.
