= Boodleopsis =

Scientific classification
- Kingdom: Plantae
- Division: Chlorophyta
- Class: Ulvophyceae
- Order: Bryopsidales
- Family: Udoteaceae
- Genus: Boodleopsis; A. Gepp & E.S. Gepp, 1911

Type species
- Boodleopsis siphonacea A.Gepp & E.S.Gepp

Species
- Boodleopsis carolinensis; Boodleopsis hawaiiensis; Boodleopsis pusilla; Boodleopsis siphonacea; Boodleopsis sundarbanensis; Boodleopsis vaucherioidea; Boodleopsis verticillata

Genus of algae

Boodleopsis is a genus of green algae in the family Udoteaceae.
