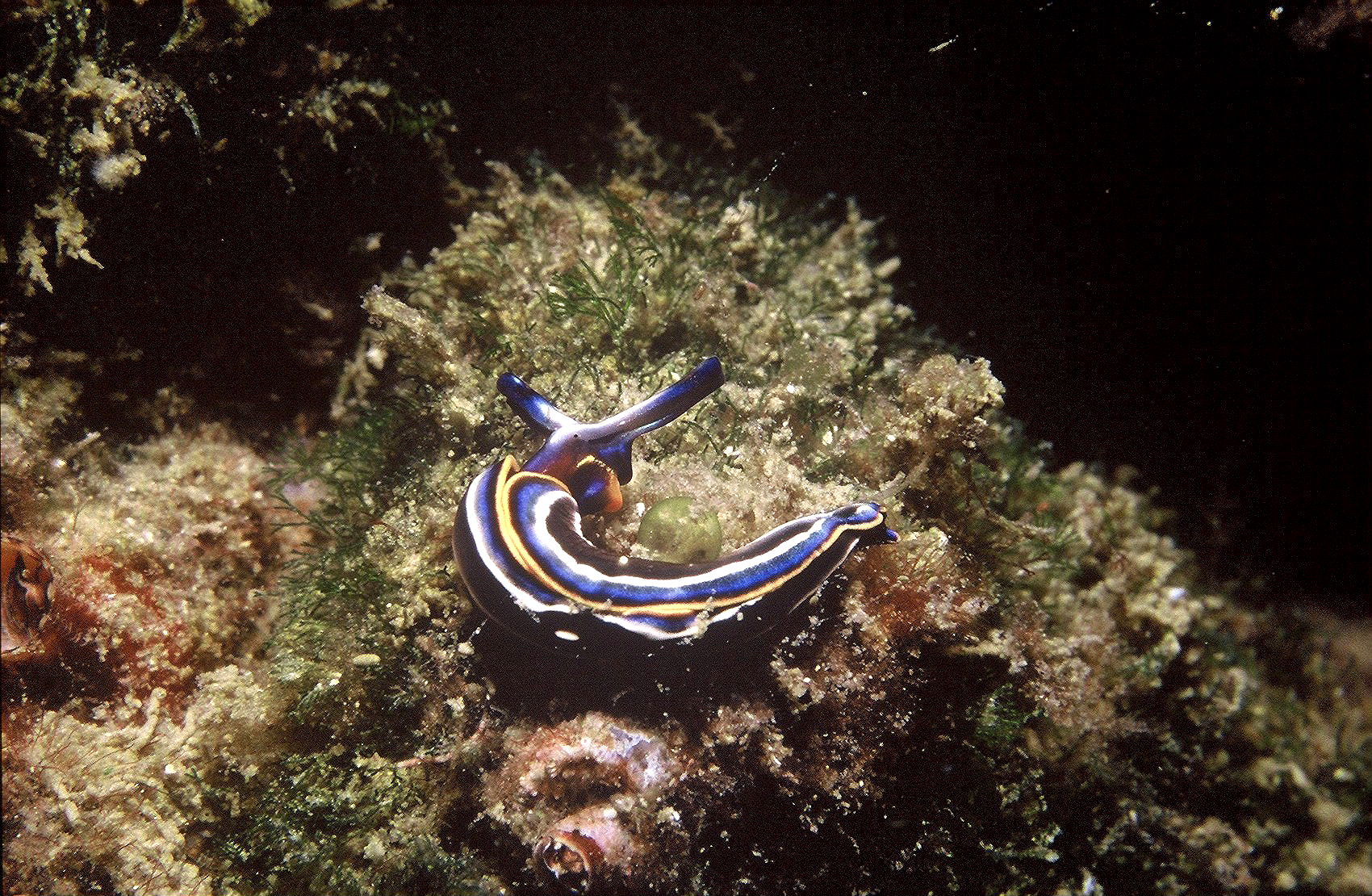
- Thuridilla hopei on Pseudochlorodesmis furcellata

Scientific classification
- Kingdom: Plantae
- Division: Chlorophyta
- Class: Ulvophyceae
- Order: Bryopsidales
- Family: Udoteaceae
- Genus: Pseudochlorodesmis; Børgesen, 1925

Type species
- Pseudochlorodesmis furcellata

Species
- Pseudochlorodesmis australis; Pseudochlorodesmis furcellata; Pseudochlorodesmis monopodialis; Pseudochlorodesmis tenuis

= Pseudochlorodesmis =

Genus of algae

Pseudochlorodesmis is a genus of green algae in the family Udoteaceae.
