= Siphonogramen =

Scientific classification
- Clade: Viridiplantae
- Division: Chlorophyta
- Class: Ulvophyceae
- Order: Bryopsidales
- Family: Udoteaceae
- Genus: Siphonogramen; I.A.Abbott & Huisman, 2004

Species
- Siphonogramen abbreviatum; Siphonogramen parvum

Genus of algae

Siphonogramen is a genus of green algae in the family Udoteaceae.
