= Botryodesmis =

Scientific classification
- Clade: Viridiplantae
- Division: Chlorophyta
- Class: Ulvophyceae
- Order: Bryopsidales
- Family: Udoteaceae
- Genus: Botryodesmis; Kraft, 2007

Type species
- Botryodesmis exocarpa Kraft, 2007

Species
- Botryodesmis carolinensis

Genus of algae

Botryodesmis is a genus of green algae in the family Udoteaceae.
