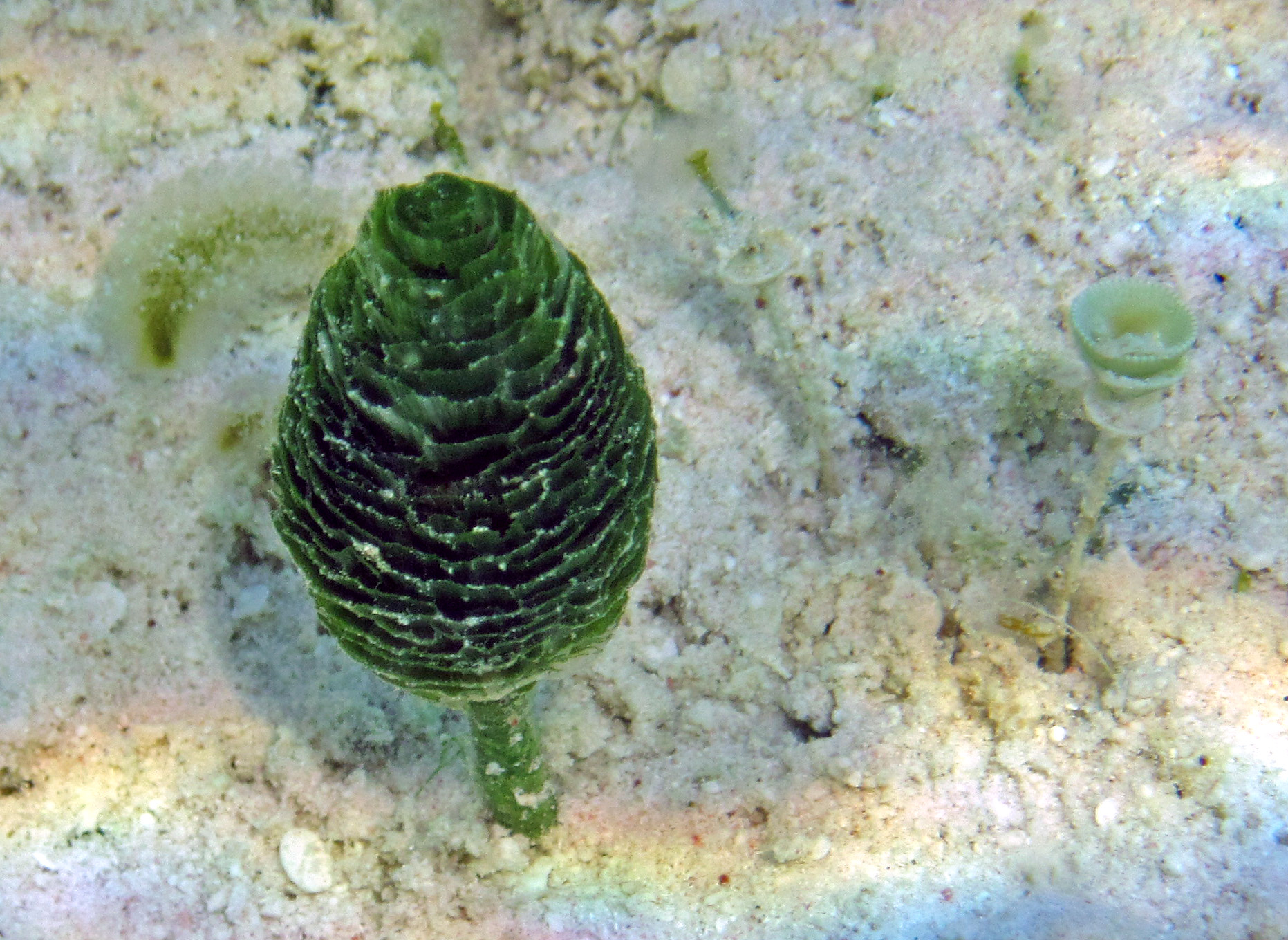
- Rhipocephalus phoenix (pinecone alga), San Salvador Island, Bahamas

Scientific classification
- Kingdom: Plantae
- Division: Chlorophyta
- Class: Ulvophyceae
- Order: Bryopsidales
- Family: Udoteaceae
- Genus: Rhipocephalus; Kützing, 1843

Species
- Rhipocephalus oblongus; Rhipocephalus phoenix

= Rhipocephalus =

Genus of algae

Rhipocephalus is a genus of green algae in the family Udoteaceae.
