= Rhipiliella =

Scientific classification
- Kingdom: Plantae
- Division: Chlorophyta
- Class: Ulvophyceae
- Order: Bryopsidales
- Family: Udoteaceae
- Genus: Rhipiliella; Kraft, 1986

Type species
- Rhipiliella verticillata

Species
- Rhipiliella verticillata

Genus of algae

Rhipiliella is a genus of green algae in the family Udoteaceae.
