= Rhipidosiphon =

Scientific classification
- Clade: Viridiplantae
- Division: Chlorophyta
- Class: Ulvophyceae
- Order: Bryopsidales
- Family: Udoteaceae
- Genus: Rhipidosiphon; Montagne, 1842

Type species
- Rhipidosiphon javensis

Species
- Rhipidosiphon floridensis; Rhipidosiphon javensis

Genus of algae

Rhipidosiphon is a genus of green algae in the family Udoteaceae.
