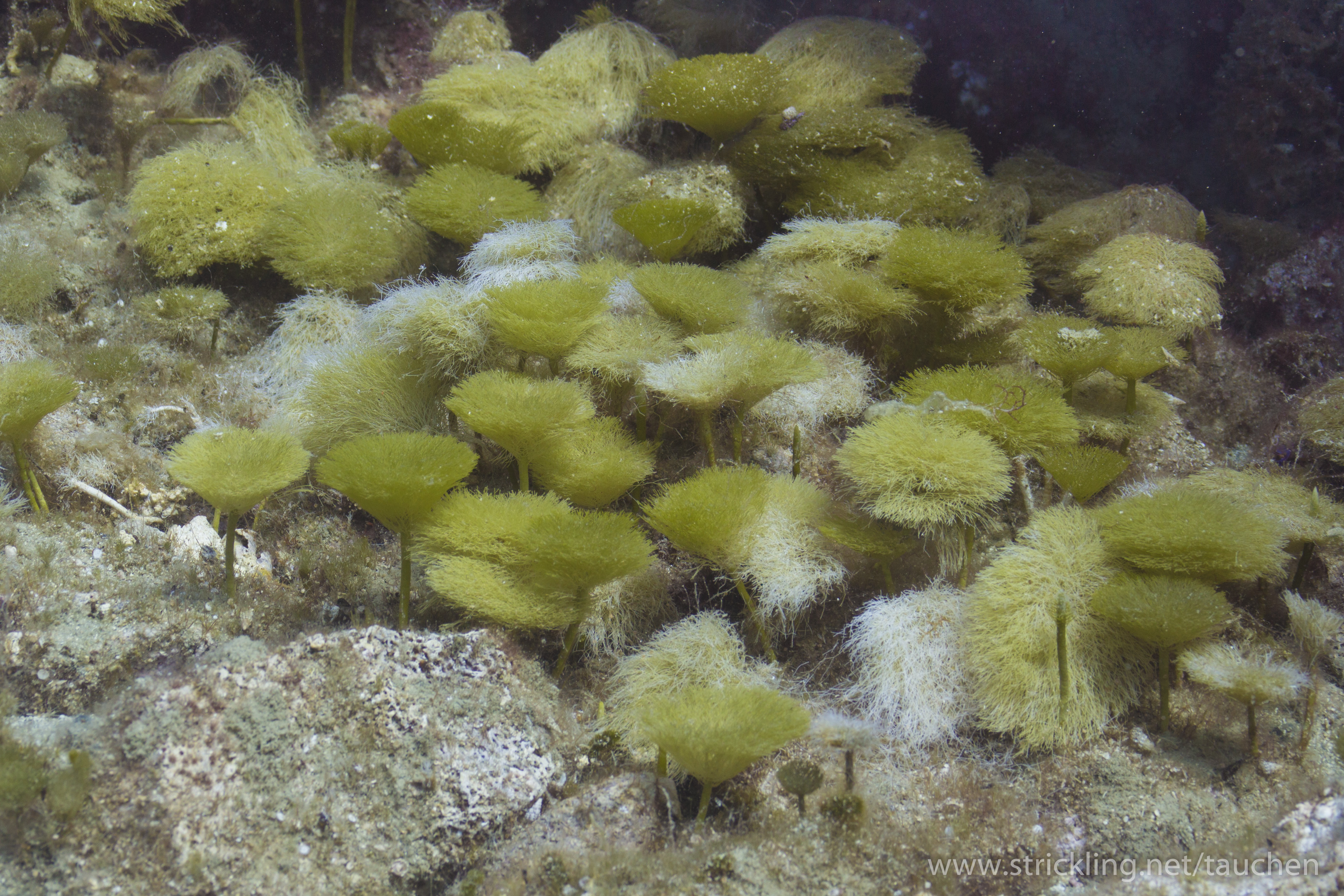

Scientific classification
- Domain: Eukaryota
- Clade: Archaeplastida
- Clade: Viridiplantae
- Division: Chlorophyta
- Class: Ulvophyceae
- Order: Bryopsidales
- Family: Udoteaceae
- Genus: Penicillus; J.B. de Lamarck, 1813

Type species
- Penicillus capitatus Lamarck, 1813

= Penicillus (alga) =

Genus of green algae

Penicillus is a genus of calcified, siphonous green algae in the order Bryopsidales. Members of the genus are commonly called shaving-brush algae because of their upright stalk and brush-like head. Current marine taxonomic databases place Penicillus in the family Halimedaceae, tribe Udoteeae, although the genus has also been treated in Udoteaceae.

== Description ==
Species of Penicillus form erect, calcified thalli that may reach about 15 cm in height. The thallus consists of a rhizoidal holdfast embedded in sediment, a stalk or stipe, and a globose, subglobose, or pear-shaped capitulum made up of numerous loose siphons. Like other bryopsidalean algae, Penicillus is siphonous or coenocytic, with large multinucleate tubular cells rather than a body divided into many small cellular compartments.

The genus is strongly calcareous. Penicillus deposits calcium carbonate, especially aragonite, and has been studied as a producer of carbonate sediment in shallow tropical marine environments. Calcium oxalate crystals have also been reported in Penicillus, Rhipocephalus, and Udotea, genera known for producing sedimentary aragonite needles.

== Taxonomy ==
The genus was established by Lamarck in 1813, with Penicillus capitatus as the type species. Synonyms listed for the genus include Coralliodendron Kützing, 1841 and Corallocephalus Kützing, 1843. Molecular work on udoteacean algae found that traditional morphology-based boundaries among genera including Penicillus, Udotea, and Chlorodesmis do not always correspond to monophyletic lineages.

== Distribution and habitat ==
Penicillus species are marine algae of shallow tropical and subtropical waters. They are especially familiar from Caribbean seagrass beds and sand flats, where they may occur with other calcified green algae such as Halimeda and Udotea. The rhizoidal base anchors the alga in unconsolidated sediment, allowing the stalk and brush to project above the substrate.

At least some species have broad distributions. P. capitatus, for example, is known from the western Atlantic and Caribbean, and recent molecular work confirmed its occurrence in the Azores, where the population was found to be closely related to western Atlantic material.

== Ecology ==
By producing aragonite, Penicillus contributes to carbonate sediment production in shallow-water tropical and subtropical systems. Its brush-like capitulum can also function as habitat for small animals. In a study of P. capitatus in Puerto Rico, the abundance and species richness of associated crustaceans increased with algal size, leading the author to describe individual thalli as "algal islands" for macrocrustaceans.

Nutrient physiology has been studied in P. capitatus associated with subtropical seagrass meadows in Bermuda. Enrichment experiments found that photosynthetic response increased significantly with nitrogen addition, indicating nitrogen limitation in the populations studied.
