= Tydemania (alga) =

Scientific classification
- Kingdom: Plantae
- Division: Chlorophyta
- Class: Ulvophyceae
- Order: Bryopsidales
- Family: Udoteaceae
- Genus: Tydemania; Weber-van Bosse, 1901

Type species
- Tydemania expeditionis Weber-van Bosse, 1901

Species
- Tydemania expeditionis

Genus of algae

Tydemania is a genus of green algae in the family Udoteaceae.
