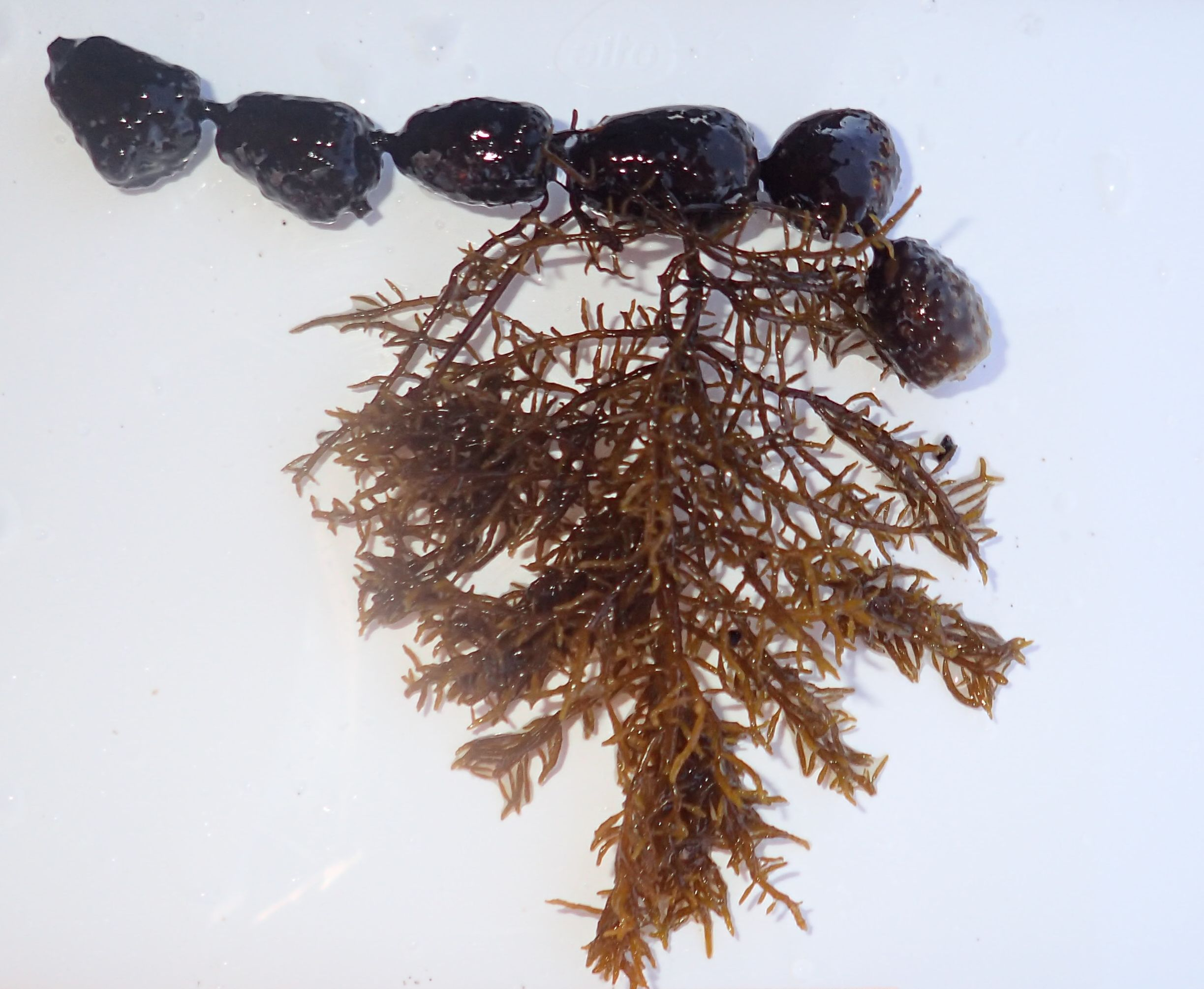
- Notheia specimen found in Kaikōura, New Zealand

Scientific classification
- Domain: Eukaryota
- Supergroup: Stramenopiles
- Division: Ochrophyta
- Class: Phaeophyceae
- Order: Fucales
- Family: Notheiaceae; O.C.Schmidt
- Genus: Notheia; Harvey & Bailey
- Species: N. anomala

Binomial name
- Notheia anomala Harvey & J.W.Bailey

= Notheia =

Species of seaweed

Notheia anomala is a macroalga in the brown algae order Fucales. It is the only species in the genus Notheia and family Notheiaceae. It is an obligate epiphyte of another brown algae, Hormosira banksii.

== Distribution ==
Notheia is native to New Zealand and southeastern Australia, matching the distribution of its host Hormosira.

== Description ==
Notheia is a small, branching brown macroalga (order Fucales).

== Epiphytism and ecology ==
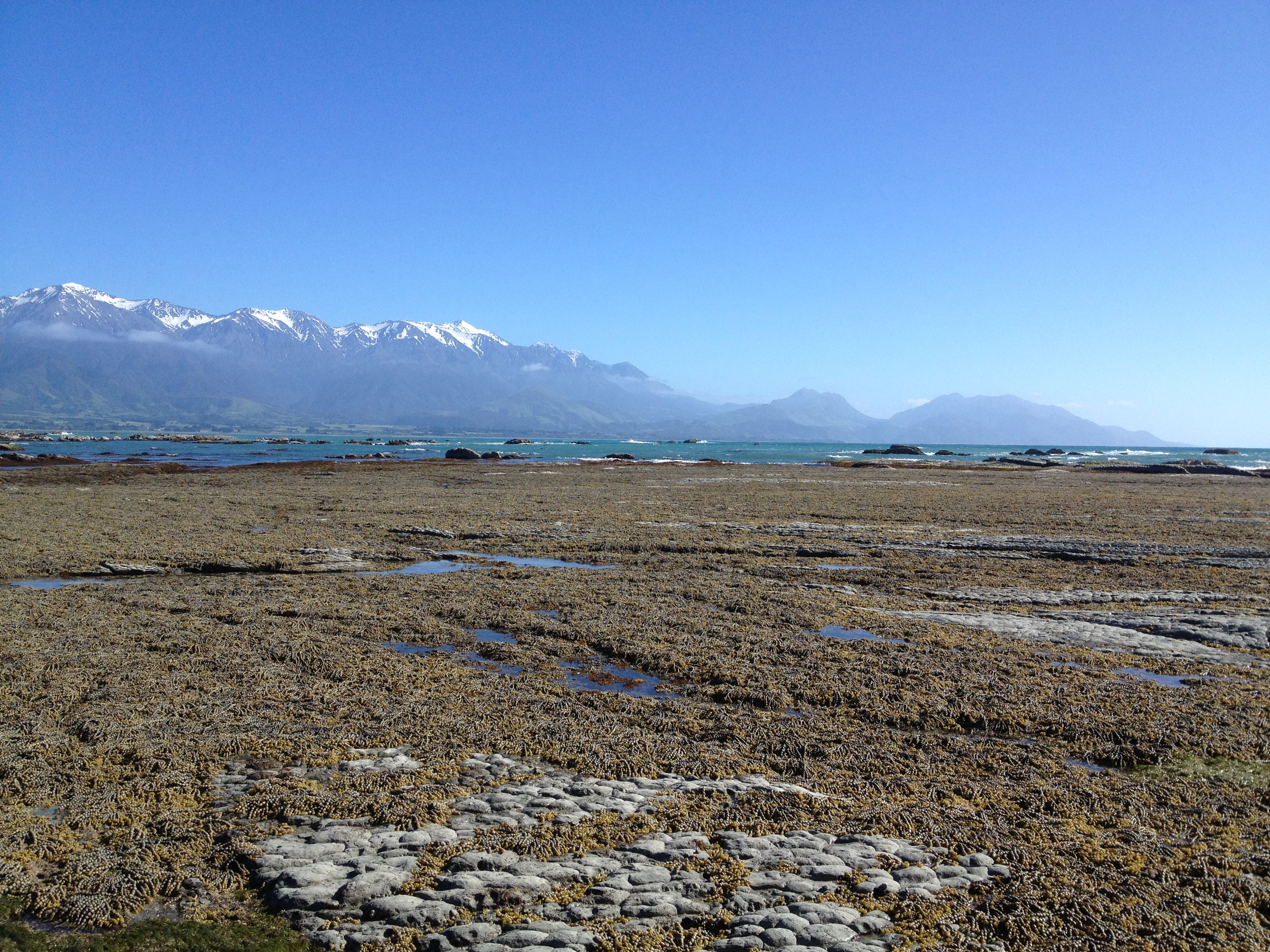
A broad rocky platform in Kaikōura, New Zealand, with high densities of Hormosira growth

Notheia is believed to be an obligate epiphyte of Hormosira banksii, although there is a single unconfirmed observation of Notheia attached to Xiphophora chondrophylla). Hormosira is also from the order Fucales - and it is rare to have an epiphyte so closely related to its host. Notheia growth appears to be entirely dependent upon its host. Attempts to grow Notheia in culture were unsuccessful until Hormosira extracts were included.

The costs to Hormosira in this relationship are still unclear. Although the tissues of Hormosira are pushed up tightly against the thallus of Notheia, which gives the impression that Notheia emerges from deep within the host, there are no plasmodesmata observed between adjacent Notheia and Hormosira cells. Similarly, the benefits that Notheia obtains from attaching to Hormosira are also unclear. The fronds of Hormosira are weakly attached to the substratum and there is frequent dislodgement in storm events or periods of high wave energy – therefore the fronds that drift may offer long-distance dispersal to Notheia which could be a key mechanism for the distributional success of this species Capon et al. (1998) highlighted for the first time that tetrahydrofurans from Notheia act as potent and selective inhibitors of the larval development of parasitic nematodes, which may be a positive effect that Hormosira receives from this symbiotic relationship. Notheia has a higher photosynthetic capacity than its host Hormosira, probably because of its greater surface area or smaller allocation to chemical defences.

In natural populations of Hormosira in Australia, tide pools have a consistently higher proportion of infected plants with Notheia than the low shore reef populations. This pattern suggests that Notheia has narrower environmental tolerances than its host. Sexually mature Hormosira have been observed to carry more infections and that infections were usually most abundant on the conceptacles - usually next to the osteoles (conceptacles openings). Although Hormosira is dioecious, Nothiea does not appear to exhibit any preference towards settlement on male or female plants.

Analyses of Notheia biomass have shown a strong positive effect on invertebrate biodiversity. Notheia provides food, protection, and niche space for a large range of small invertebrates, which in turn are an important source of food for higher trophic levels.

Images of Notheia anomala
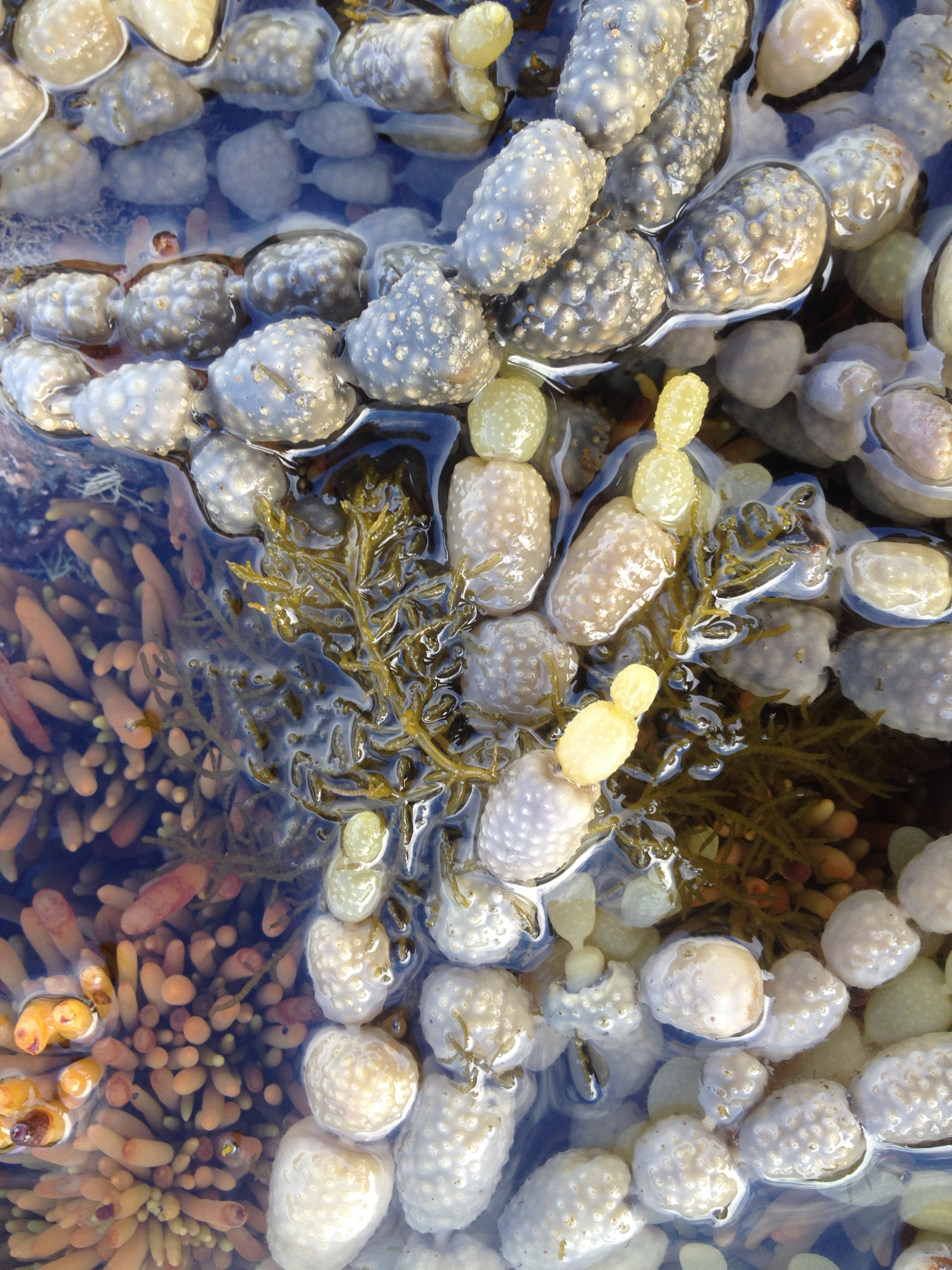
Notheia growing on Hormosira in a tide pool at Kaikōura, New Zealand

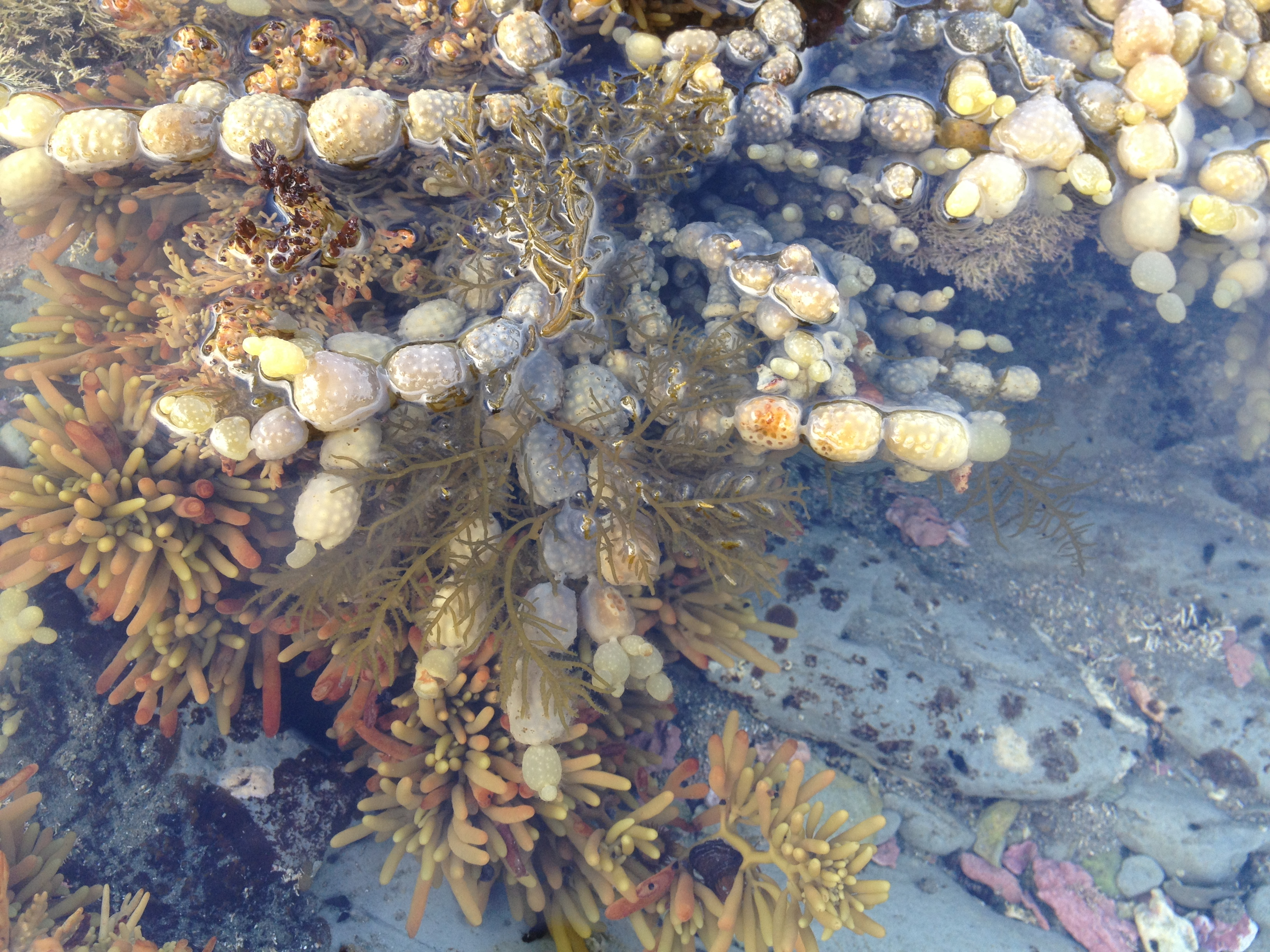
Notheia growing on Hormosira

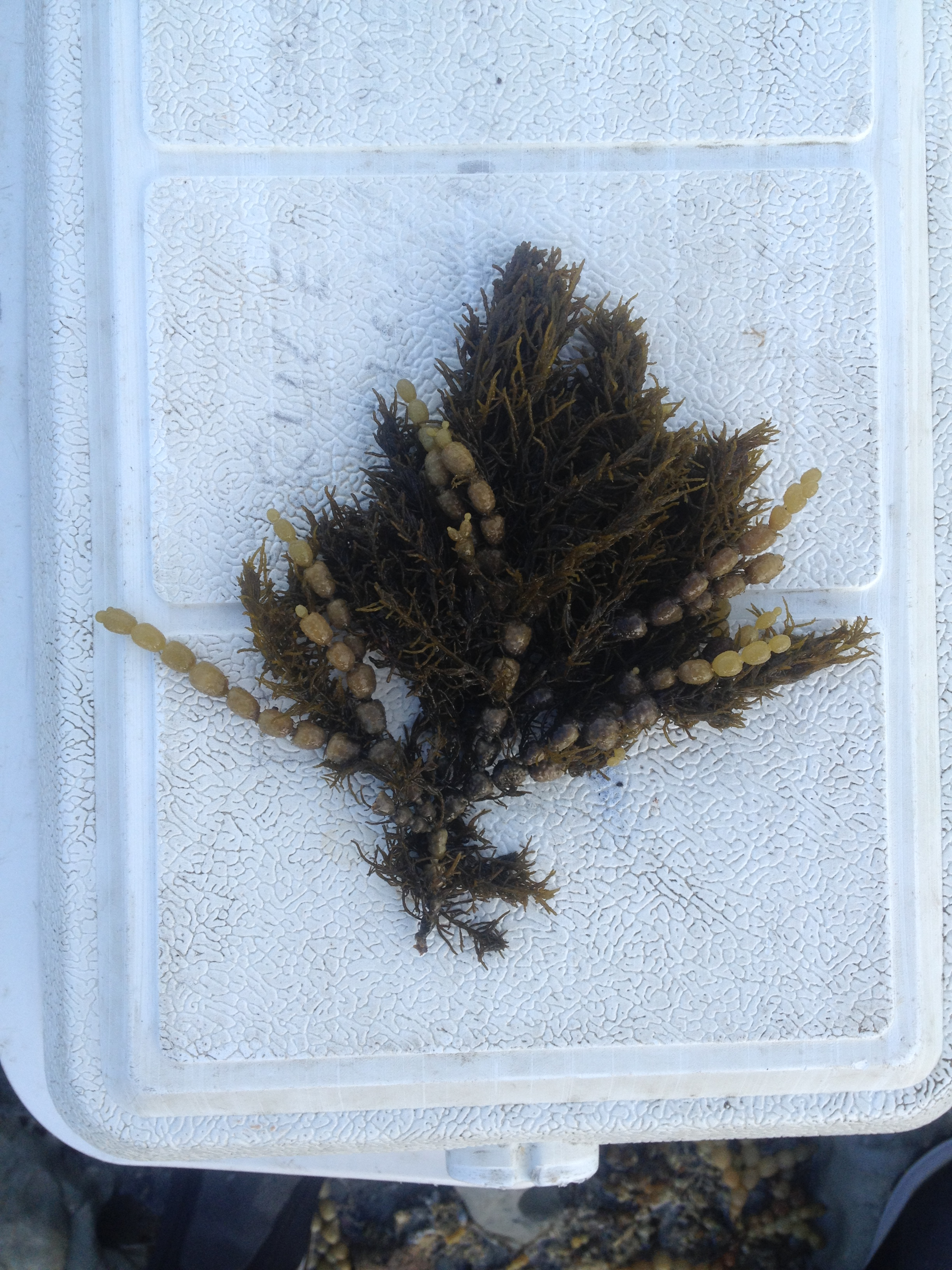
A thallus of Hormosira covered in Notheia

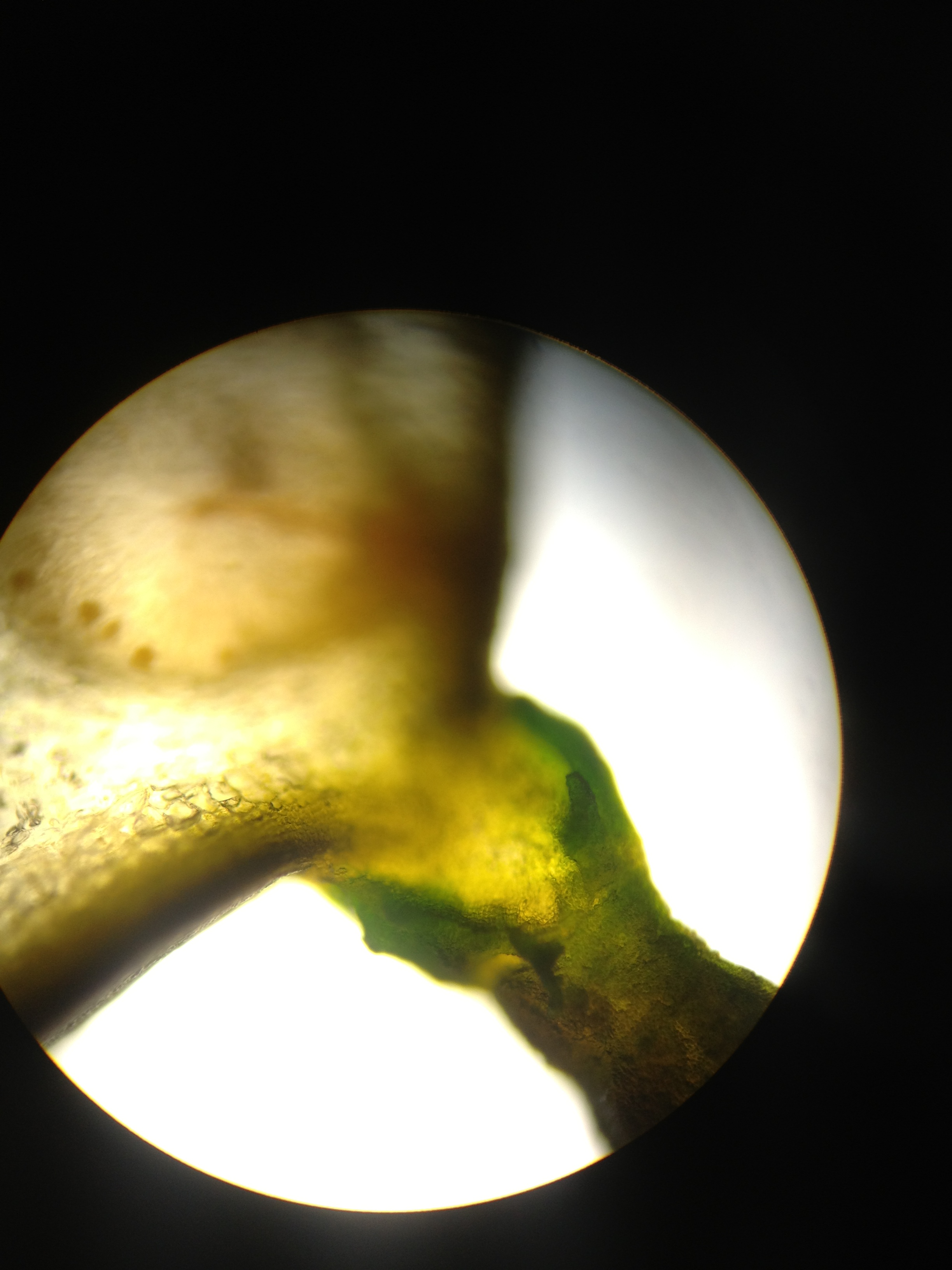
Base of a Notheia plant attached to Hormosira tissue

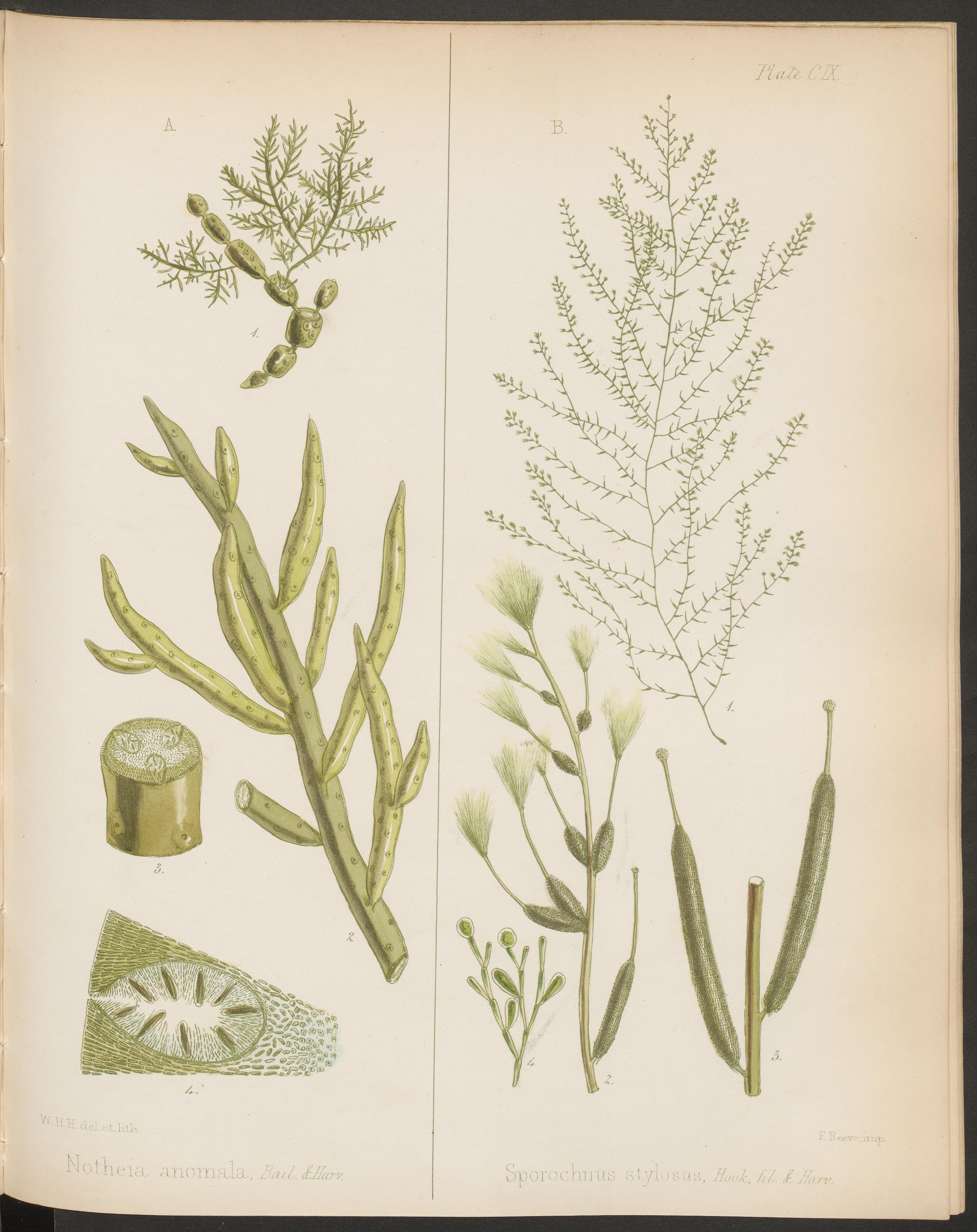
A taxonomic illustration of Notheia (top left) by William Henry Harvey (1855)

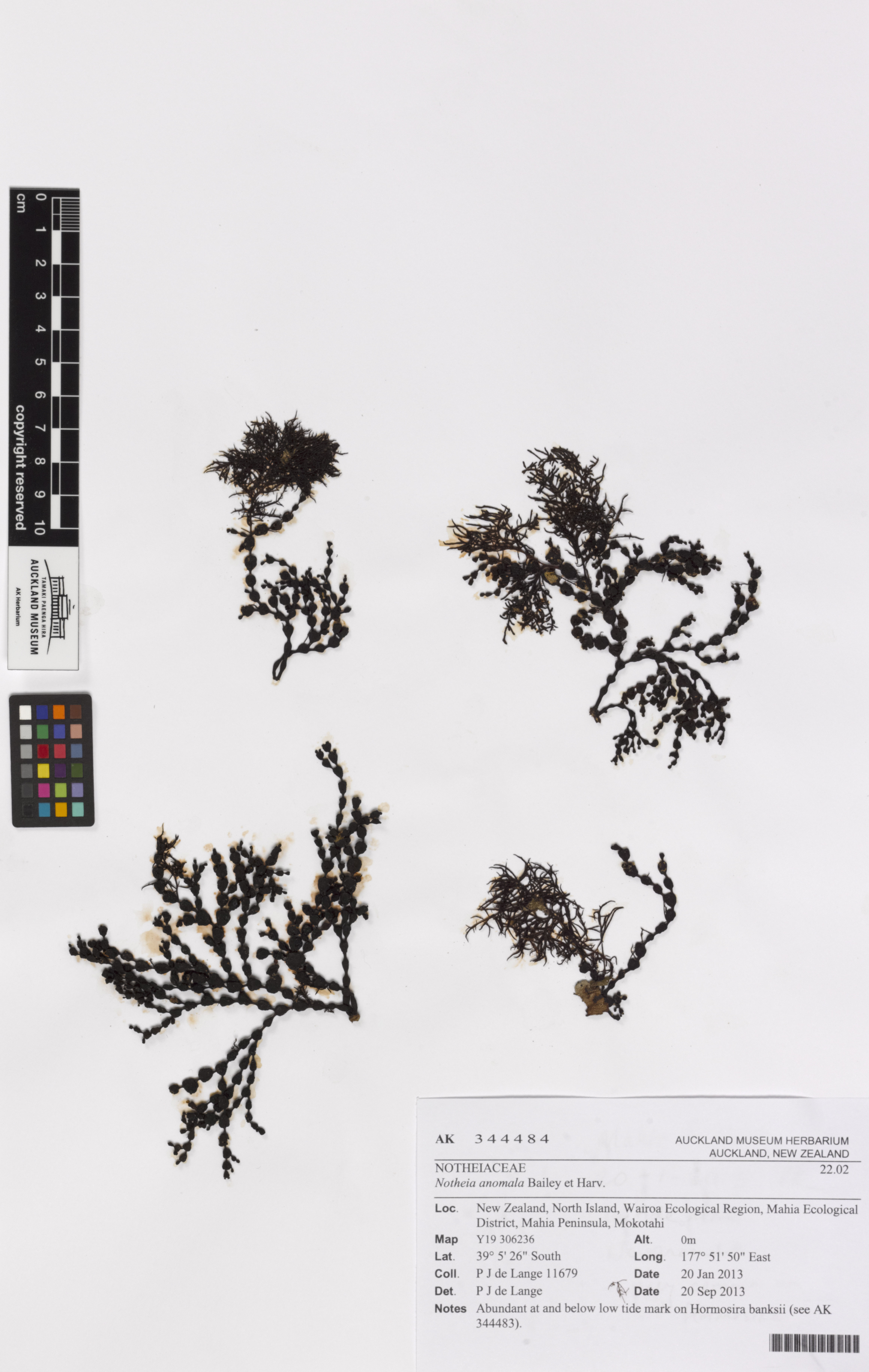
Dried, herbarium samples of Notheia held at Auckland War Memorial Museum

== Reproduction ==
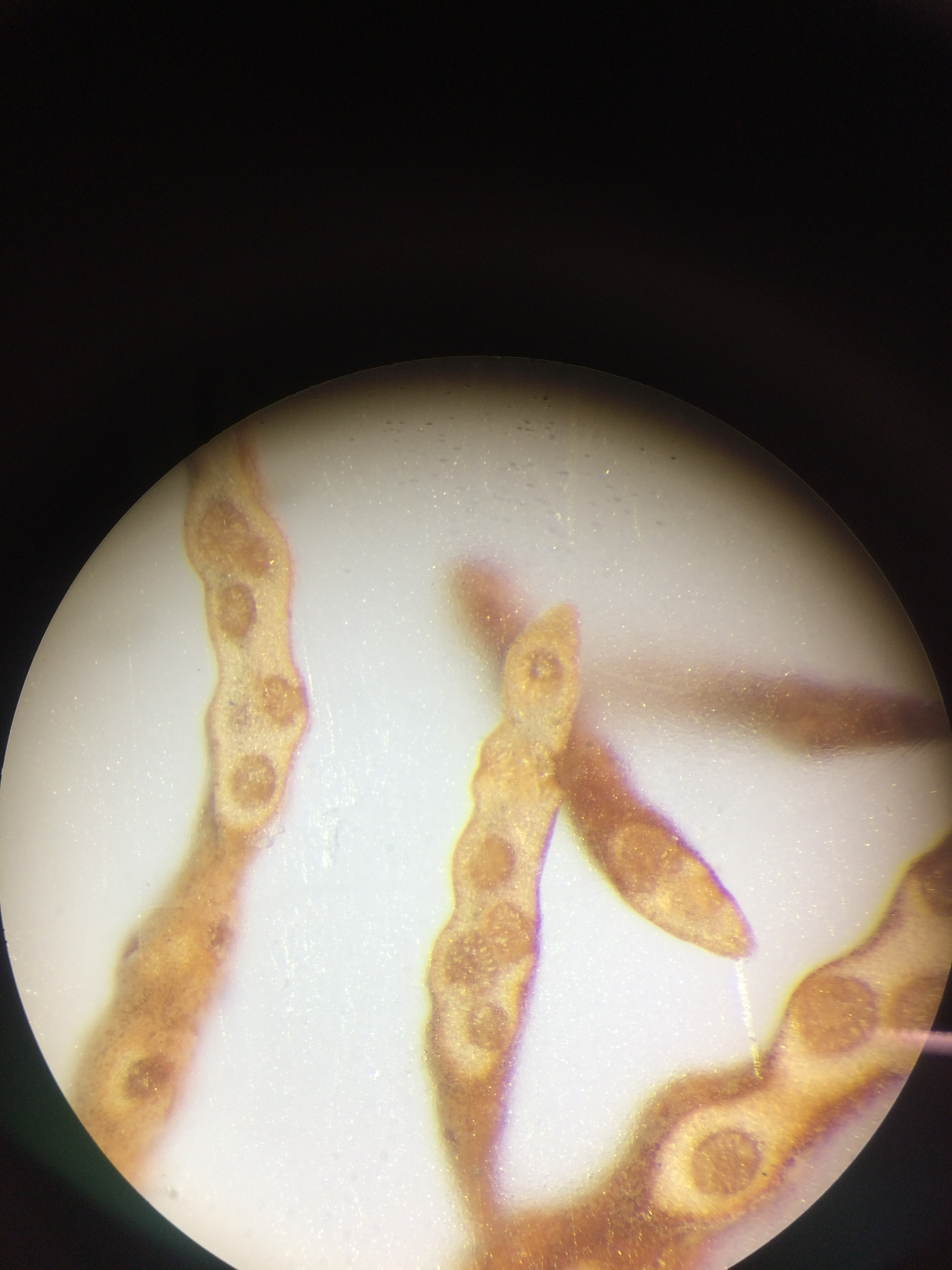
Notheia conceptacles. Photo taken from an embedded wax block during histology studies

Notheia is monoecious and produces male and female gametangia in the same conceptacle. Female gametangia are present throughout the year, and they develop either on branched or unbranched stalks within the conceptacle, or directly from the walls of conceptacles. They contain 8 zooids each 10-12 μm long by 5-6 μm wide. About 4 hours after release via paraphyses, female gametes begin to settle. Male gametangia have been observed only between April and July (Southern Hemisphere, Australia). They are borne in a similar manner to the female gametangia, and contain 64 zooids, each 5 μm long by 2-3 μm wide.

Both gametes are pyriform in shape (pear form) with two laterally inserted flagella (the anterior one longer than the posterior). They each possess one eyespot - and have never been observed to contain two or more. Male and female gametes freely intermingle within a conceptacle, but as long as female gametes are motile, males are not attracted to them. About 4 h after release, female gametes settle on surrounding Hormosira tissue, and once that has occurred, the male gametes are then attracted to the settled female gametes.
