= Callipsygma =

Scientific classification
- Clade: Viridiplantae
- Division: Chlorophyta
- Class: Ulvophyceae
- Order: Bryopsidales
- Family: Udoteaceae
- Genus: Callipsygma; J. Agardh, 1887

Type species
- Callipsygma wilsonis

Species
- Callipsygma wilsonis

Genus of algae

Callipsygma is a genus of green algae in the family Udoteaceae.
