= Penicillin (disambiguation) =

Penicillin is a group of antibiotic medicines.

Penicillin may also refer to:

- Penicillin (band), a Japanese visual kei/alternative rock band
- Penicillin (cocktail), a cocktail based on whiskey, ginger, and lemon
- Penicillin (counter-artillery system), a Russian military sensor system
- "Penicillin (It Doesn't Mean Much)", a song by The Velvet Teen from Elysium, 2004
