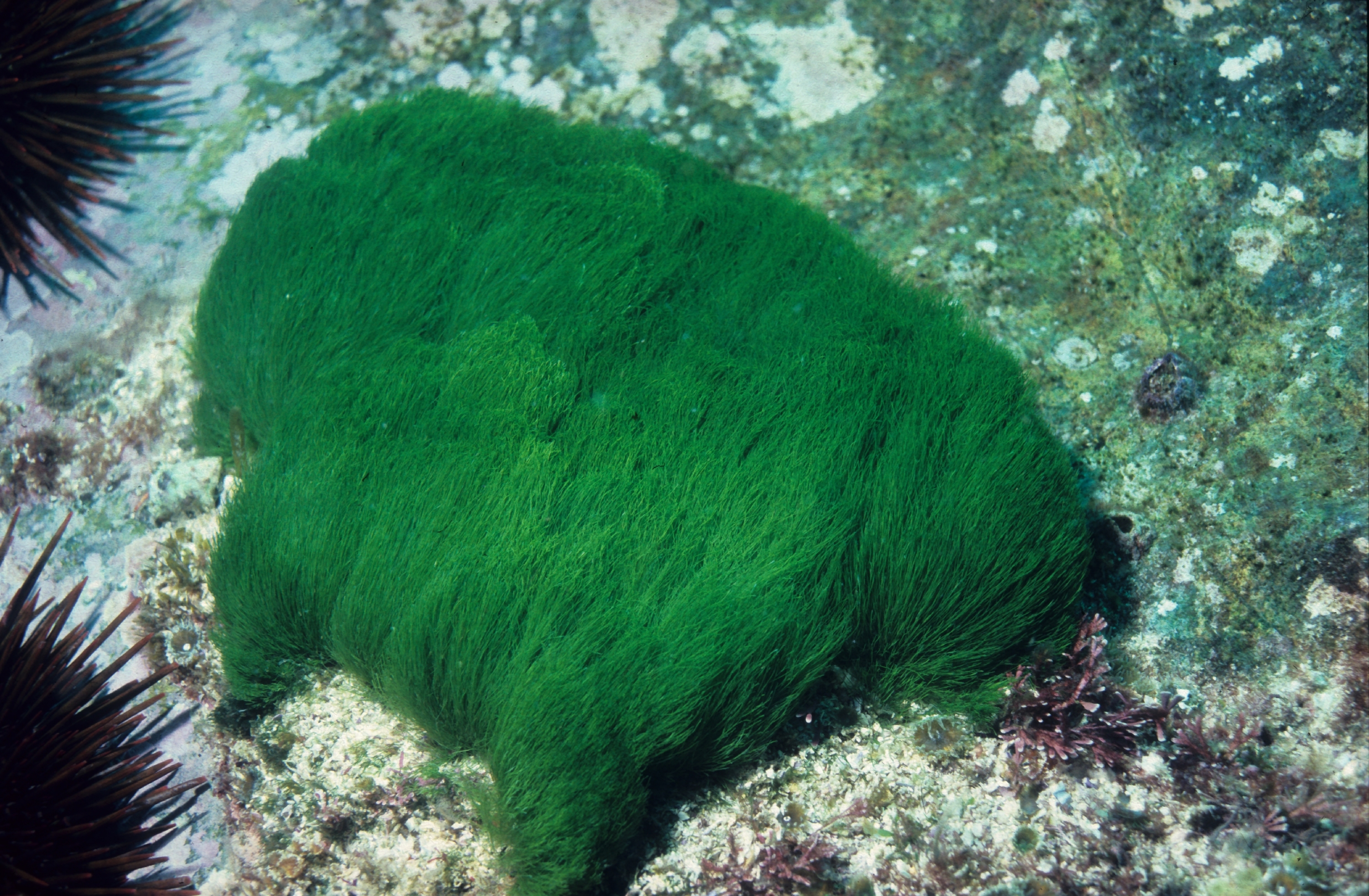
- Chlorodesmis fastigiata

Scientific classification
- Domain: Eukaryota
- Supergroup: Archaeplastida
- Clade: Viridiplantae
- Division: Chlorophyta
- Class: Ulvophyceae
- Order: Bryopsidales
- Family: Udoteaceae; J. Agardh, 1887

Genera
- Boodleopsis; Botryodesmis; Callipsygma; Chlorodesmis; Chloroplegma; Coralliodendron; Penicillus; Poropsis; Pseudochlorodesmis; Pseudopenicillus; Rhipidosiphon; Rhipiliella; Rhipocephalus; Siphonogramen; Tydemania; Udotea

= Udoteaceae =

Family of algae

Udoteaceae is a family of green algae, in the order Bryopsidales.

== Description ==
Udoteaceae is a family of green algae that belongs to the order Bryopsidales. Udoteaceae are most abundant in reef ecosystems as it serves an important ecological role as a primary producer, contributor to carbonate fluxes, and it serves as protection or food for other marine organisms.

Udoteaceae is the most morphologically complex family belonging to the order Bryopsidales. Along with its high morphological complexity, Udoteaceae also has high species diversity. There are fourteen genera, eight extant, belonging to the family Udoteaceae, however only four are officially accepted. There are twenty-four species belonging to these genera, however because genetic information on Udoteaceae is limited, these species are classified primarily from morphological features.

Udoteaceae's structure is siphonous and composed of a giant, multinucleate tubular cell. Udoteaceae contains taxa that are either calcified or non-calcified. The species range from simple siphonous filaments to complex multiaxial structures. Genera from Udoteaceae include tufts of uncalcified and free filaments, a brush-like calcified thallus, or calcareous compact fan-shaped blades.

== Reproduction ==
Both sexual and asexual reproduction is observed under green algae (Chlorophyta). However, Bryopsidales, the order Udoteaceae belongs to, sexual reproduction is most common.

Sexual reproduction utilizes meiosis, which will produce gametes, germ cells from two parents. The sperm cells and the egg cells will fuse, making a zygote. In most multicellular green algae, the sperm cells are small and motile, and the egg cells are large and immotile. However, in simple multicellular or unicellular algae, germ cells are typically isogamous, which means the germ cells from both parents are the same size. Ulvophyceae, the class Udoteaceae belongs to, contains both multicellular and multinucleated organisms. However, Bryopsidales, the order for Udoteaceae, multinucleated organisms, so it can be assumed that Udoteaceae is as well.

The time it takes for the gametes to be fertilized after being released varies greatly among the green algae (Chlorophyta). The genus Udotea, can take up to ninety-six hours after the gametes are released before being fertilized.

== Origin ==
Udoteaceae's origin dates back about 216 mya (million years ago), which would be around the Late Triassic period. Most of the genera from Udoteaceae originated between 66 and 23 mya (Paleogene period).

Fossil evidence of Udoteaceae suggests that the family originated from the western Tethys Sea. The Tethys Sea was present until 66 mya, and it was located between the two continents Gondwana and Laurasia. The center of diversity shifted from the Western Tethys to the Central Indo-Pacific once the archipelagos were formed.

Three centers of diversity have been identified for Udoteaceae: The Central Indo-Pacific, the Western Indian Ocean, and the Greater Caribbean region. The Central-Indo Pacific is considered the center of origin, the Western Indian Ocean is considered the center of origin and accumulation, and finally the Greater Caribbean is considered the more recent center of origin.

== Distribution ==
Udoteaceae are widespread geographically, its species are mostly found in tropical and subtropical regions. They also can be found in temperate regions of the Atlantic, Pacific, and Indian Oceans, as well as in the Red and Mediterranean seas. They are abundant in reef ecosystems and serve an important ecological role. Udoteaceae play a major part in the ecological system as a primary producer and as a contributor to carbonate fluxes. They are also important in the food chain as they are used for food by organisms, and they can be used by smaller organisms for hiding from predators. As they are primary producers, access to light is important for Udoteaceae, so they will be more common in shallow and clearer waters.
