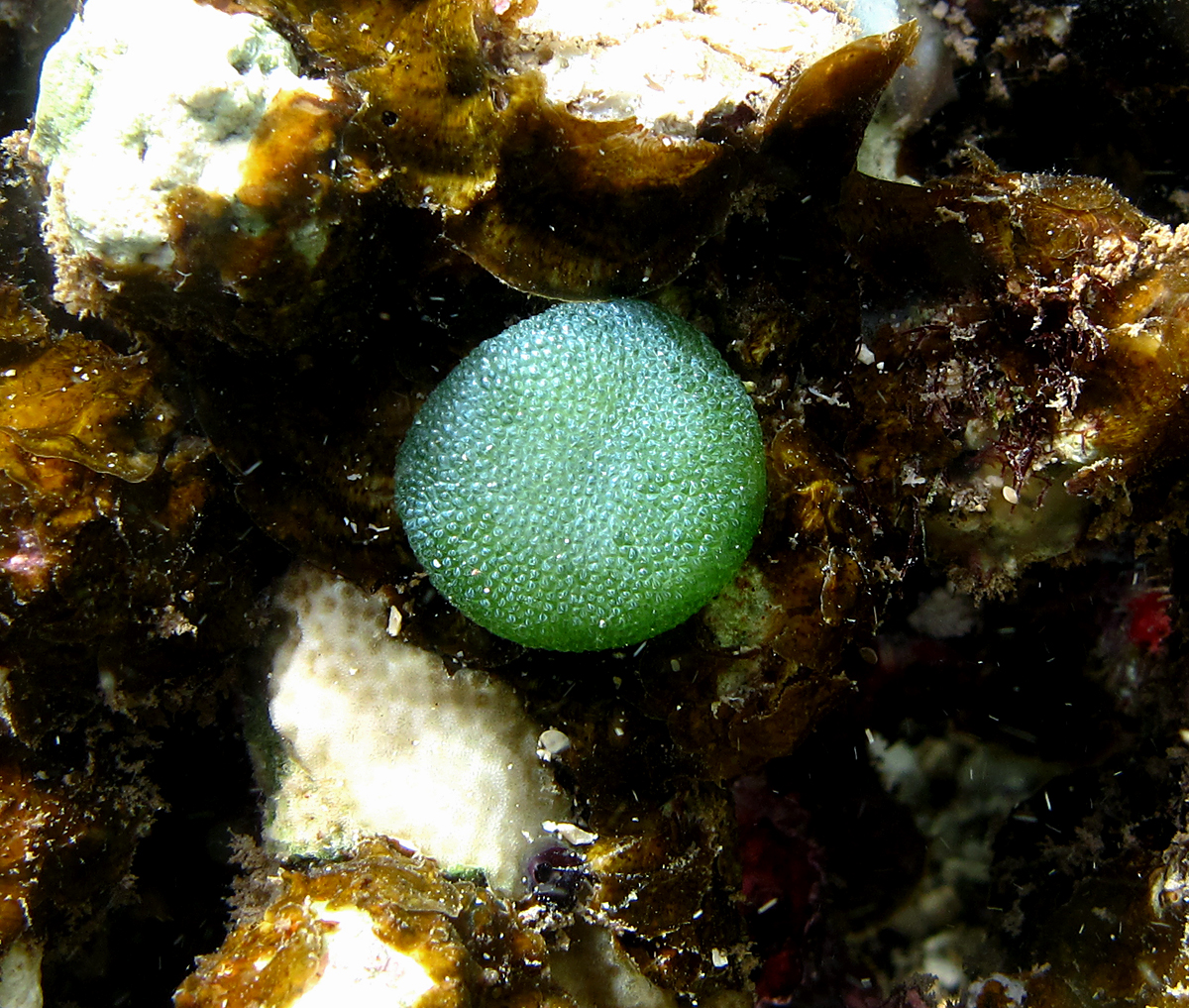

Scientific classification
- Clade: Viridiplantae
- Division: Chlorophyta
- Class: Ulvophyceae
- Order: Cladophorales
- Family: Siphonocladaceae
- Genus: Dictyosphaeria
- Species: D. versluysii

Binomial name
- Dictyosphaeria versluysii Weber-van Bosse

= Dictyosphaeria versluysii =

Species of algae

Dictyosphaeria versluysii is a species of green algae (class Ulvophyceae) in the family Siphonocladaceae. This species is indigenous to Indonesia, with a world distribution ranging from the Pacific regions and extending to the Indian Ocean. It can be found in various countries including Mexico, China, Thailand, Vietnam, the Philippines, Australia, and Hawaii.

== Description ==
The green pigmentation of Dictyosphaeria versluysii is attributed to its high chlorophyll content, enabling it to conduct photosynthesis. Additionally, the color of this alga varies from grass green to bluish, rendering it a distinct member of the algal community. D.versluysii exhibits bubble-like cells and possesses a solid structure, retaining a rounded shape with a segment ranging from 1 to 5 cm. This marine protist is notable for its distinctive cellular structure, it is known to be enveloped by cell walls that extend into intricate trabecular formations. The smaller cells situated along these walls display a semicircular morphology, accompanied by brief fringe-like extensions that securely attach to the larger cells. This unique combination of features highlights the intriguing and complex nature of Dictyosphaeria versluysii in the marine environment. Plants typically adopt flattened solid cushions or mats, with a maximum diameter of 5 cm. The polygonal segments are up to 2 mm in diameter and give rise to new segments in three planes, forming a pseudoparenchymatous clump. Hapteroid cells, with a branching structure and a length of up to 270 μm, intricately attach outer walls to adjacent segments. The segments of the plant have narrow spines and trabeculae on their inner surfaces. The trabeculae range from simple to furcate and are 50-150 μm long.

== Distribution ==
The overall geographic range of Dictyosphaeria versluysii is broad, spanning various countries and regions worldwide. It can be found in the Caribbean Sea, Gulf of Mexico, Pacific Mexico, West and South Africa, Ascension Island, Indian Ocean Islands, China, Japan, Southeast Asia, Papua New Guinea, North and West Australia, and tropical Pacific Islands.

== Habitat ==
Dictyosphaeria versluysii can be found in a variety of habitats ranging from intertidal zones to depths of up to 76 meters in the deep ocean. This species is known to grow in tide pool and on coral reefs, making it a versatile and hardy organism. It is typically found anchored to rocks or coral rubble in shallow, tranquil reef flats and tidepools. Dictyosphaeria versluysii is known for its non-invasive nature within its natural habitat, which sets it apart from other species that exhibit weedy characteristics. Rather than spreading out, it prefers to form distinct clusters of compact "bubbles" that are evenly distributed among the turf on firm substrates.

== Comparison ==
Dictyosphaeria versluysii is typically grayish-green and has a solid structure that is firmly attached to rocky substrates. In contrast, the plants known as Dictyosphaeria cavernosa are usually green in color and have a hollow structure that can eventually form into a cup shape. It is commonly found on reef flats, forming large stands and is sometimes considered a nuisance weed. It grows exclusively on rocks, filling spaces between coral fingers and is usually found in shallow subtidal areas, but has also been found at greater depths. D. versluysii is similar in habitat to D. cavernosa but is less common and often grows into small cushions.
