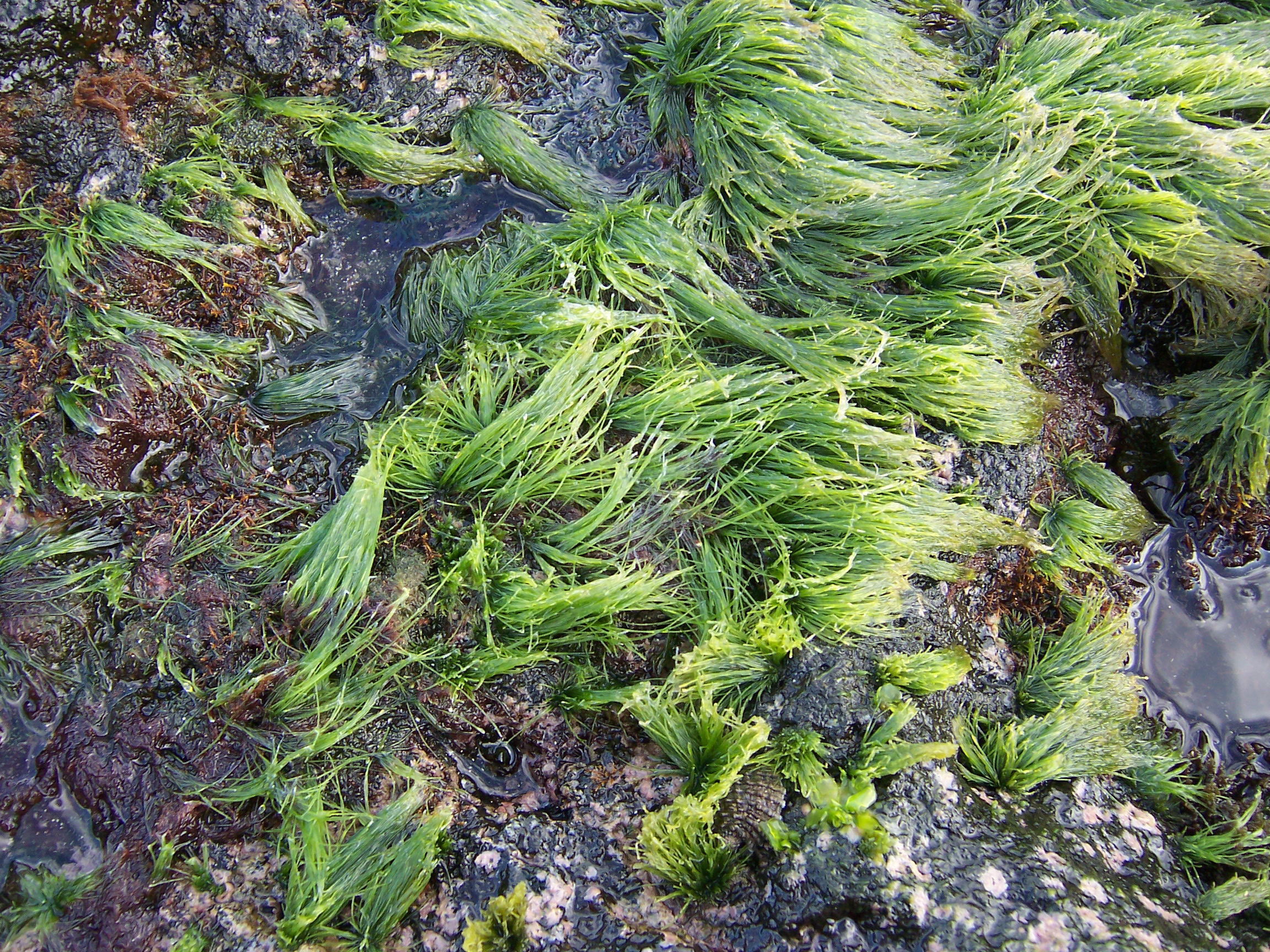
- Tufts of Chaetomorpha antennina

Scientific classification
- Kingdom: Plantae
- Division: Chlorophyta
- Class: Ulvophyceae
- Order: Cladophorales
- Family: Cladophoraceae
- Genus: Chaetomorpha
- Species: C. antennina

Binomial name
- Chaetomorpha antennina (Bory de Saint-Vincent) Kützing, 1847

= Chaetomorpha antennina =

Species of alga

Chaetomorpha antennina is a species of green algae of the family Cladophoraceae.

Chaetomorpha antennina typically forms erect brush-like tufts of straight, rigid, unbranched filaments on surf-exposed intertidal to shallow subtidal rocky shores and attaches by rhizoids; however, under laboratory culture conditions the filaments may produce lateral branches, demonstrating morphological plasticity.
