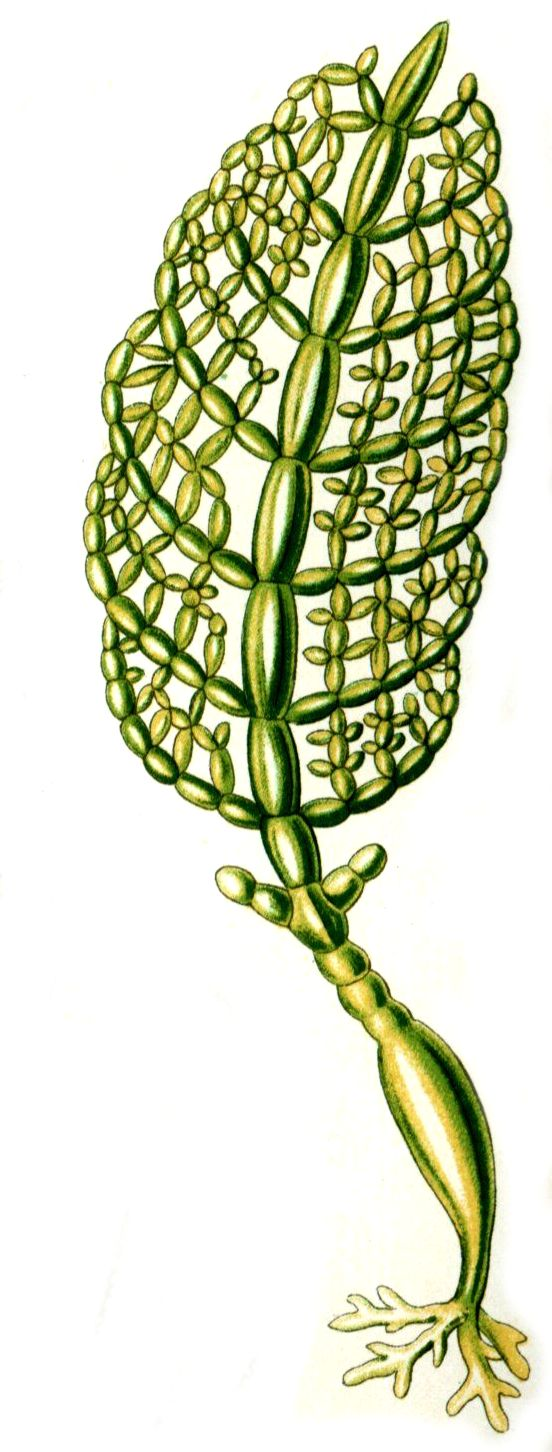

Scientific classification
- Domain: Eukaryota
- Clade: Archaeplastida
- Clade: Viridiplantae
- Division: Chlorophyta
- Class: Ulvophyceae
- Order: Cladophorales
- Family: Boodleaceae
- Genus: Struvea; Sonder

Type species
- Struvea plumosa Sonder

Species
- Struvea elegans; Struvea okamurae; Struvea plumosa; Struvea thoracica

= Struvea =

Genus of algae

Struvea is a genus of green macroalgae (or seaweed) in the family Boodleaceae.

== Taxonomy and Nomenclature ==
This genus was founded by Otto Wilhelm Sonder in 1845 and was named in honor of the Russian ambassador H. de Struve. Initially, the genus name was in conflict with Struvea Reichenbach, a heterotypic synonym of Torreya Arnott but P.C. Silva formally conserved Struvea Sonder in 1952 to prevent further taxonomic problems. Currently, there is only four confirmed species for this genus. This low species number was due to the segregation of Phyllodictyon from Struvea sensu lato based on differences in cell division processes and later on supported by molecular data. The Struvea plumosa sample collected by Ludwig Preiss from western Australia was described by Sonder and now serves as the holotype species for this genus. The voucher specimen for the type species is housed at the Royal Botanic Gardens Melbourne (MEL).

== Morphology ==
The thallus of Struvea is composed of a single to numerous (clumped) blades borne from a monosiphonous or aseptate stipe (i.e., stipitate in nature); moreover, the blades form a stellate or criss-cross network of 2–3 ranks of distichously-arranged pinnae (laterals) lying on one plane. Members of this genus exhibit one of the four major types of cytokinesis within the order Cladophorales—segregative cellular division (SCD)—wherein the cytoplasm of a mother cell divides simultaneously into several independent cytoplasms that would later on produce cell walls and become daughter cells. Differences between the type of cell division process has been used to delineate the members of Cladophorales, most notably the delineation between Struvea and Phyllodictyon—the latter of which exhibits centripetal invagination by a primordial septum (CI). In terms of its cellular ultrastructure, the cell walls of Struvea are composed of crystalline inclusions forming single crystals that are broad, prismatic, and hexagonal, diamond, needle-shaped, or triangular in shape. Chloroplasts are also reticulate or net-like with numerous pyrenoids.

== Distribution ==
Struvea are widely distributed in the tropics and subtropics, mainly Australia and the tropical Western Pacific. Struvea elegans is the most widely distributed species encompassing the Caribbean islands, Oman, and Fiji. Meanwhile, S. plumosa and S. thoracica are only found in Oceania. Lastly, S. okamurae seems to be restricted within the tropical Western Pacific with Micronesia as the limit of its westernmost range. However, this distribution data on Struvea could just be an artefact of poor taxon sampling.

== Ecology ==
Members of this genus are found on the intertidal zone down to mesophotic depths. Struvea plumosa inhabit limestone areas of the intertidal zone down to 33 meters deep. S. elegans are only restricted to mesophotic depths. S. okamurae is epilithic and found between 4–6 meters in depth. Lastly, S. thoracica thrive in subtidal channels and/or reef flats of about 15–18 m in depth with substrate primarily composed of shell fragments and coral debris.

== Life history ==
Unfortunately, research on the life history of this genus is centered around its growth (SCD) rather than reproduction. However, being a member of family Boodleaceae the general cycle is believed to be diplontic and presence of zoospores have been observed.

== Exploitation/Harvesting/Cultivation ==
Due to its unknown life cycle, relatively few representative species, and its tendency to inhabit subtidal areas—this genus is not harvested from the wild and there is no known culture technology.

== Chemical composition/Natural products chemistry ==
Most chemistry research work on this genus is mainly centered around the calcium oxalate crystals present within the cell walls of the blades. Out of the four species, S. elegans does not possess any crystals while S. plumosa has diamond, triangular or pentagonal-shaped crystals and S. thoracica has needle-shaped ones.

== Utilization and Management ==
Due to a lack of general interest and use, there is currently no utilization and management strategy for the members of this genus.
