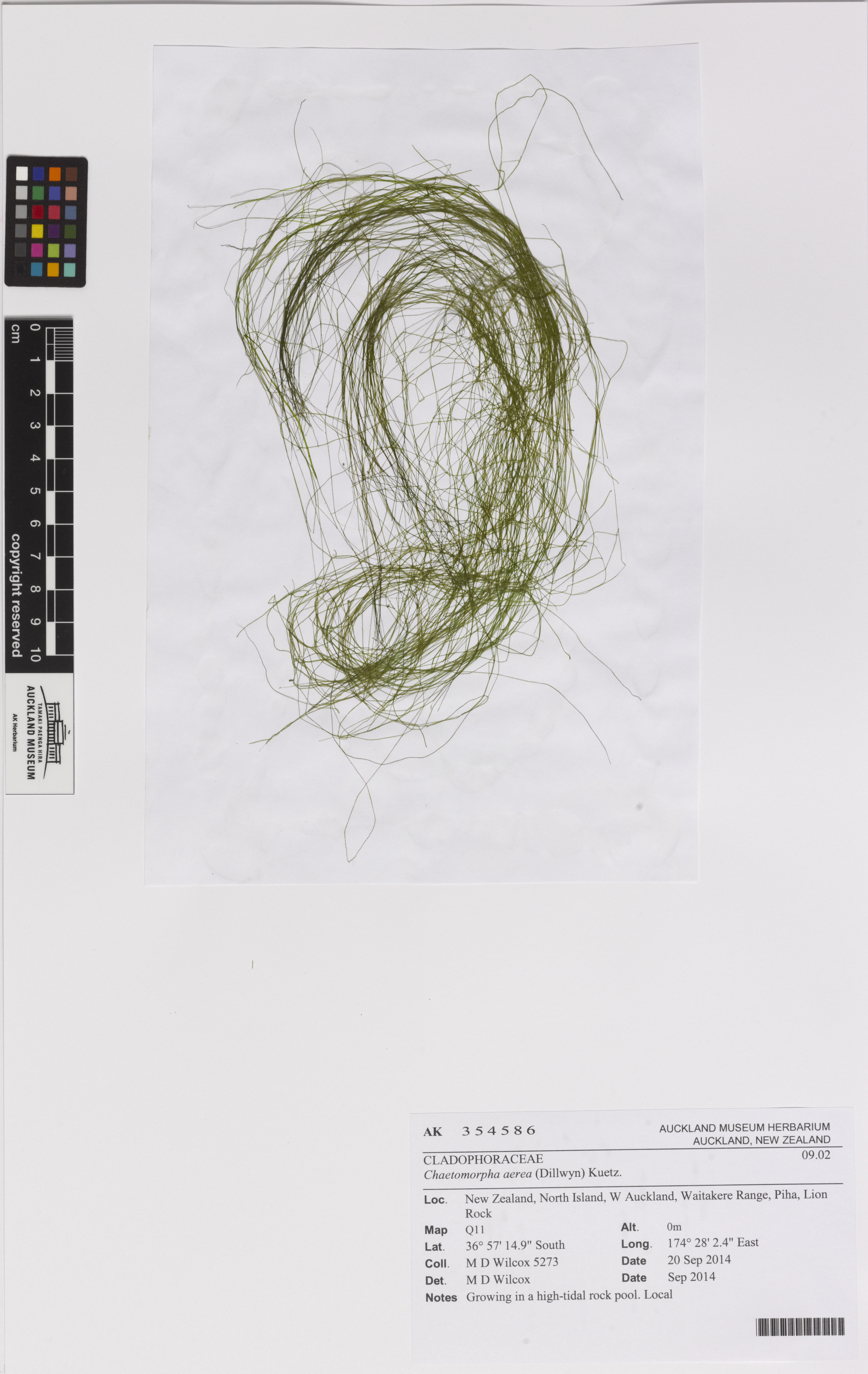

Scientific classification
- Kingdom: Plantae
- Division: Chlorophyta
- Class: Ulvophyceae
- Order: Cladophorales
- Family: Cladophoraceae
- Genus: Chaetomorpha
- Species: C. aerea

Binomial name
- Chaetomorpha aerea (Dillwyn) Kütz., 1849

= Chaetomorpha aerea =

Species of alga

Chaetomorpha aerea is a species of green algae of the family Cladophoraceae.

Chaetomorpha aerea and Chaetomorpha linum are considered conspecific by some authors, other authors do not accept this synonymy. The genus to which this species belongs is regarded as needing further taxonomic investigation.

== Description ==
Cheatomorpha aerea is the attached form.

== Distribution ==
This species is wide spread world wide. In New Zealand it is found in upper to mid-intertidal pool on the coast of the North and South Islands, Chatham Islands and Stewart Island.
