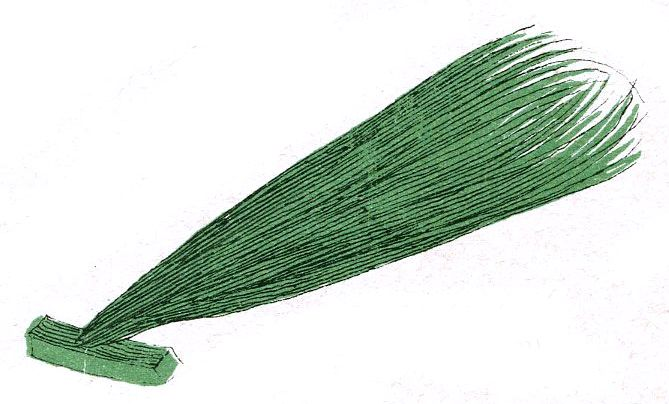

Scientific classification
- Clade: Viridiplantae
- Division: Chlorophyta
- Class: Ulvophyceae
- Order: Cladophorales
- Family: Cladophoraceae
- Genus: Chaetomorpha
- Species: C. linum

Binomial name
- Chaetomorpha linum (Muller) Kütz., 1849

= Chaetomorpha linum =

Species of alga

Chaetomorpha linum is a species of green algae in the family Cladophoraceae.

Chaetomorpha linum and Chaetomorpha aerea are considered by some authors to be conspecific. This is not accepted by other authorities.

== Description ==
Chaetomorpha linum is a species composed of fine hair-like, uniseriate, unbranched filaments. Cells 1 - 2 times as long as broad, maximum width 585μm. Cells cylindrical or barrel-shaped. Both unattached (C. linum) and attached (C. aerea) forms exist. The unattached plants form masses of twisted filaments the attached filament grow as tufts from a definite base.

== Habitat ==
In Ireland found in fresh water. Both attached and unattached forms are to be found in marine waters.

== Distribution ==
Both C. linum and C. aerea are found around the British Isles and around Europe into the Mediterranean and Mar Menor. In North America it is to be found along the Atlantic coast and in California.
