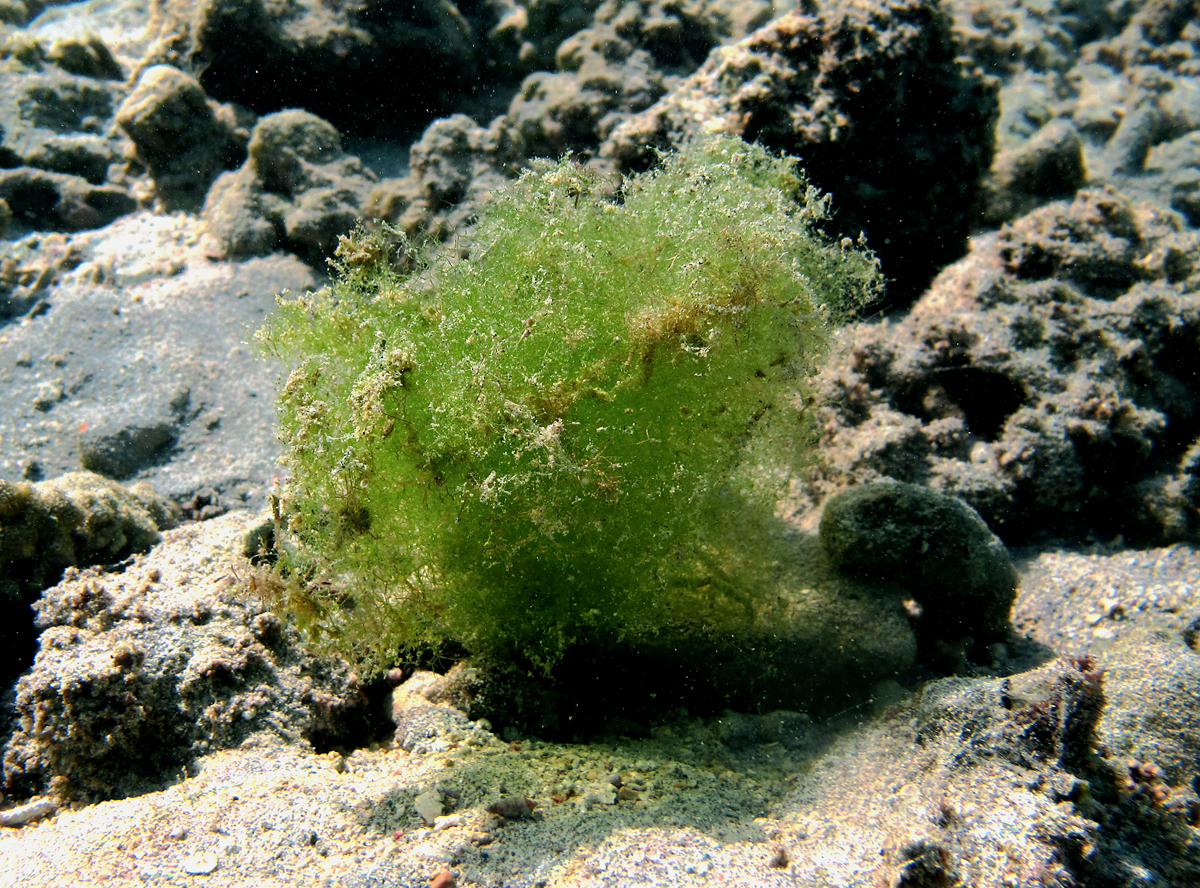
- Boodlea composita

Scientific classification
- Kingdom: Plantae
- Division: Chlorophyta
- Class: Ulvophyceae
- Order: Cladophorales
- Family: Boodleaceae
- Genus: Boodlea; G.Murray & De Toni

Species
- Boodlea composita; Boodlea montagnei; Boodlea siamensis; Boodlea sp. 13133A; Boodlea sp. BW-01079

= Boodlea =

Genus of algae

Boodlea is a genus of green algae in the family Boodleaceae. Species may be known as crunchy hair grass.

The algae grows brittle, filamentous hair-like growths. It is known as a pest in marine aquaria.

== Etymology ==
Boodlea was named after the British botanist and public servant Leonard Alfred Boodle in J. Linn. Soc., Bot. vol.25 on pages 243-245 in 1889.
