= Chamaedoris =

Scientific classification
- Kingdom: Plantae
- Division: Chlorophyta
- Class: Ulvophyceae
- Order: Cladophorales
- Family: Siphonocladaceae
- Genus: Chamaedoris; Montagne

Species
- Chamaedoris peniculum; Chamaedoris auriculata; Chamaedoris delphinii

Genus of algae

Chamaedoris is a genus of green algae in the family Siphonocladaceae.
