= Anadyomene =

Anadyomene may refer to:

- Anadyomene (alga), a species of alga
- Venus Anadyomene, a representation of the goddess Venus/Aphrodite
- Anadyomene (Adoration of Aphrodite), an orchestral composition by Einojuhani Rautavaara
