= Struveopsis =

Scientific classification
- Clade: Viridiplantae
- Division: Chlorophyta
- Class: Ulvophyceae
- Order: Cladophorales
- Family: Boodleaceae
- Genus: Struveopsis; Rhyne & H.Robinson, 1968

Type species
- Struveopsis chagoensis Rhyne & H.Robinson, 1968

Genus of algae

Struveopsis is a genus of green algae in the family Boodleaceae.

The genus was circumscribed by Willem ten Rhijne (Wilhelmus ten Rhyne) and Harold Ernest Robinson in Phytologia vol.17 (7) on pages 467-468 in 1968.

The genus name of Struveopsis is in honour of Gustav Adolph Struve (1811–1889), who was a German Apothecary and botanist. He was an apothecary in his hometown of Dresden.

== Species ==
- Struveopsis chagoensis Rhyne & H.Robinson, 1968
- Struveopsis covalamensis (Iyengar) P.C.Silva, 1996
- Struveopsis siamensis (Egerod) P.C.Silva, 1996
- Struveopsis sp. SF-7-6-94-1-14

Struveopsis robusta (Setchell & N.L.Gardner) Rhyne & H.Robinson, 1968 is now a synonym of Phyllodictyon robustum (Setchell & N.L.Gardner) Leliaert & Wysor, 2008
