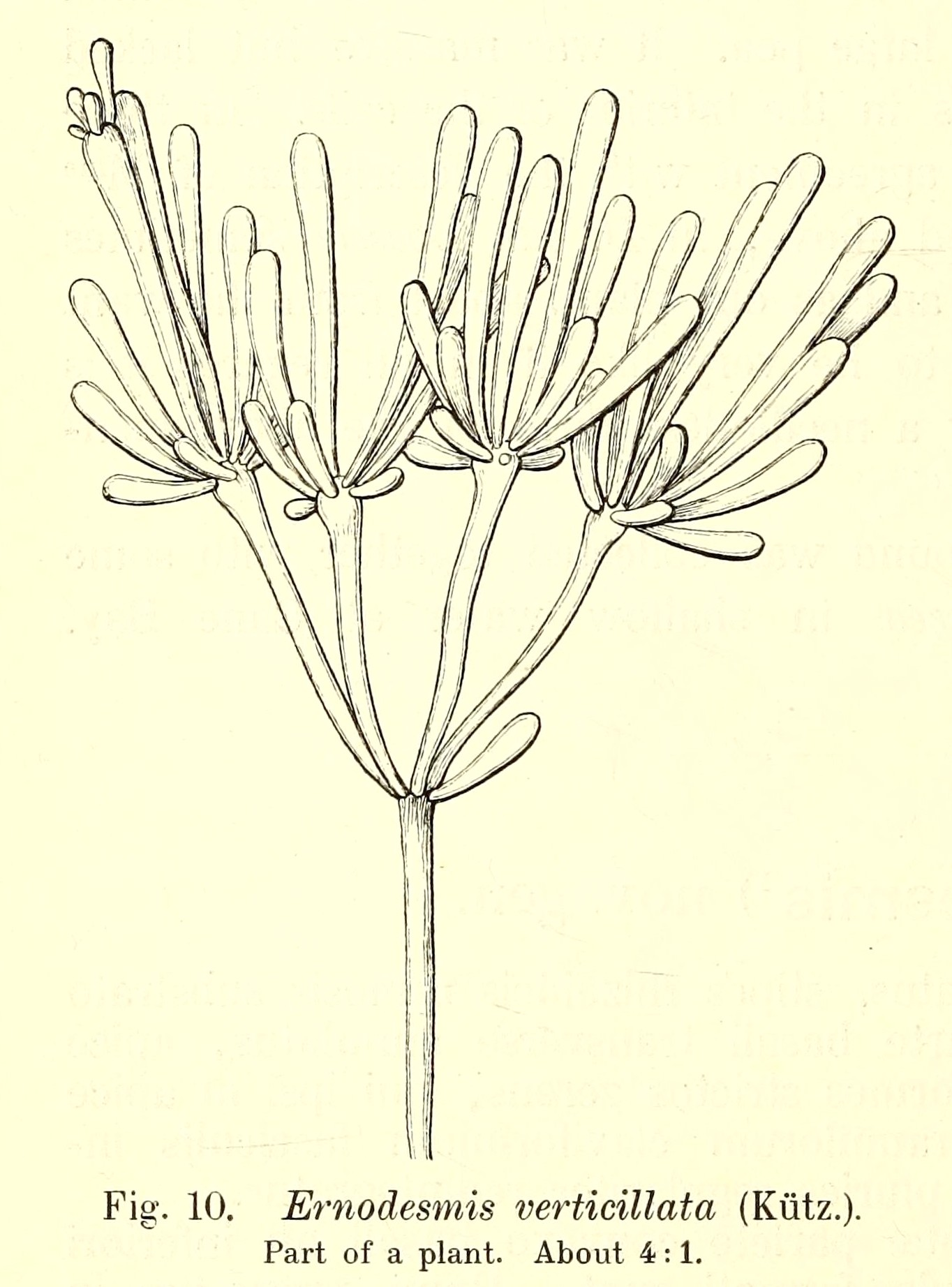

Scientific classification
- Kingdom: Plantae
- Division: Chlorophyta
- Class: Ulvophyceae
- Order: Cladophorales
- Family: Siphonocladaceae
- Genus: Ernodesmis; F.Borgesen

Species
- Ernodesmis verticillata

= Ernodesmis =

Genus of algae

Ernodesmis is a genus of green algae in the family Siphonocladaceae.
