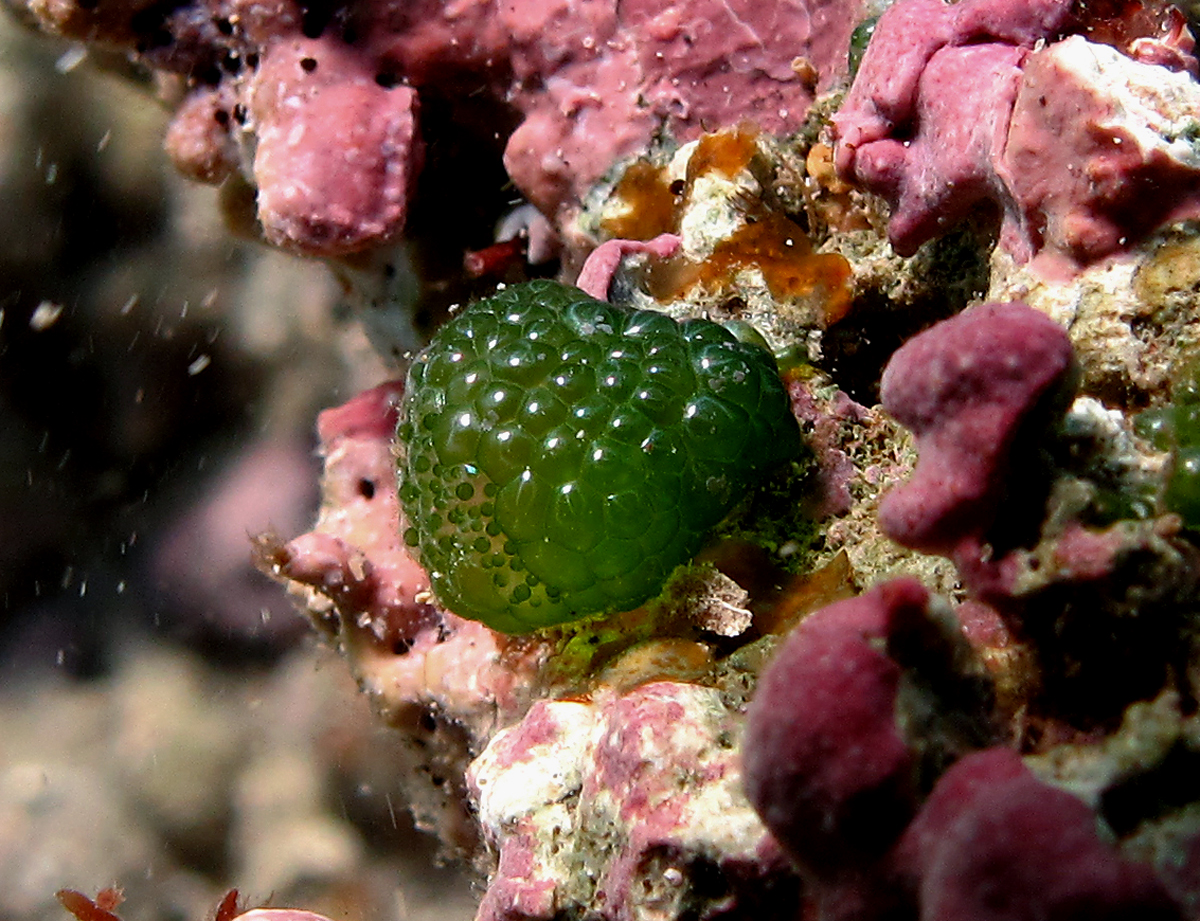

Scientific classification
- Kingdom: Plantae
- Division: Chlorophyta
- Class: Ulvophyceae
- Order: Cladophorales
- Family: Siphonocladaceae
- Genus: Dictyosphaeria; Decaisne

= Dictyosphaeria =

Genus of algae

Dictyosphaeria is a genus of green algae (class Ulvophyceae) in the family Siphonocladaceae.

== Taxonomy and nomenclature ==
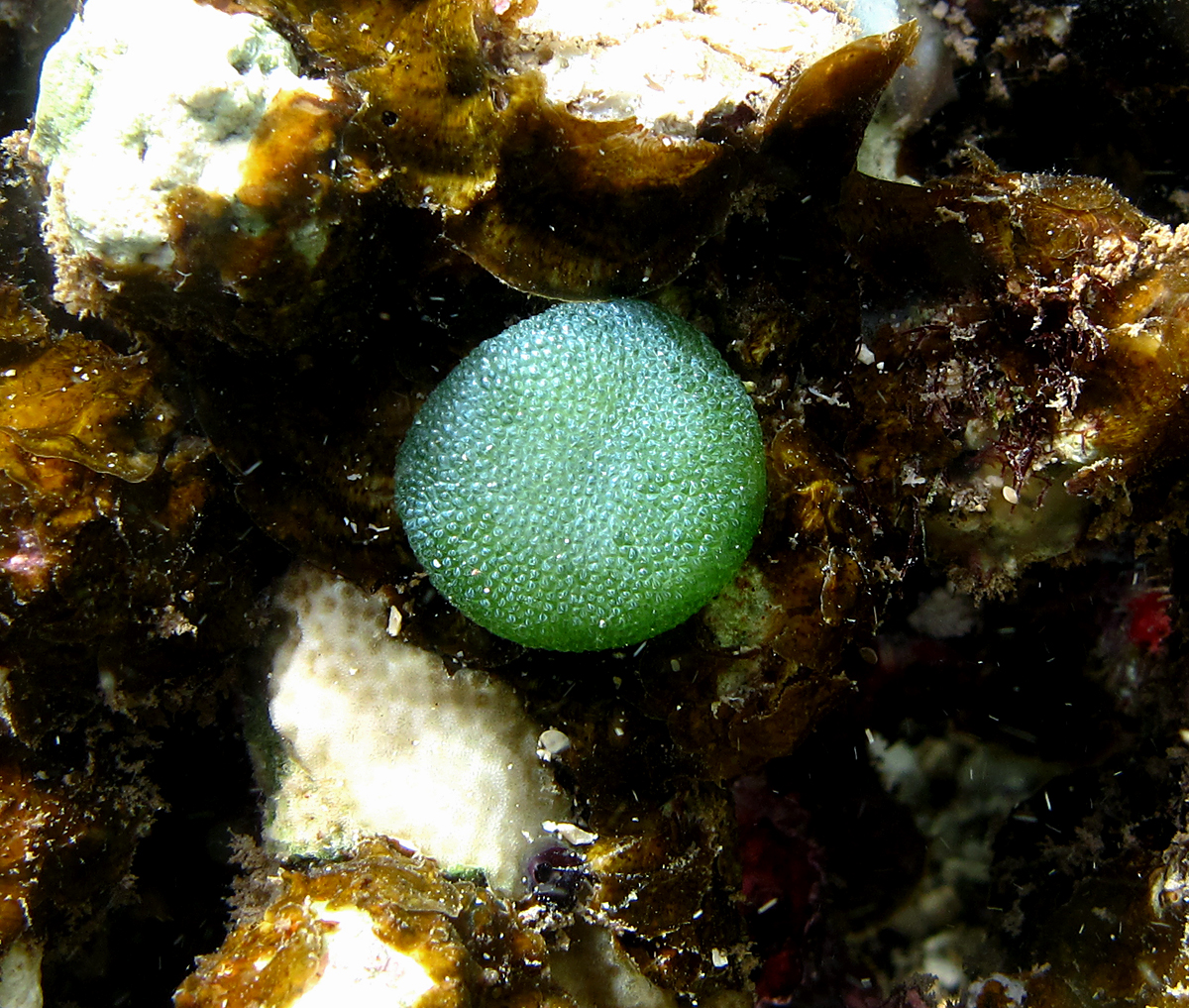
Habit of Dictyosphaeria versluysii attached in a rocky substrate

The genus Dictyosphaeria belongs to the order of Cladophorales and family Siphonocladaceae. It comprises a total of 13 taxonomically recognized species.

Below is a list of taxonomically accepted species from the genus Dictyosphearia:

- Dictyosphaeria australis Setchell
- Dictyosphaeria cavernosa (Forsskål) Børgesen
- Dictyosphaeria enteromorpha Montagne & Millardet
- Dictyosphaeria intermedia Weber Bosse
- Dictyosphaeria mutica Yamada
- Dictyosphaeria ocellata (M.Howe) Olsen-Stojkovich
- Dictyosphaeria sericea Harvey
- Dictyosphaeria spinifera C.K.Tseng & C.F.Chang
- Dictyosphaeria ulvacea Kützing
- Dictyosphaeria valonioides Zanardini
- Dictyosphaeria versluysii Weber Bosse

== General morphological description ==
=== Thalli ===
The thalli are composed of visibly hollow hexagonal or polygonal cells; and are monostromatic or polystromatic depending on species. They can be solid or button-shaped at around 1–5 cm; and spherical and club-shaped at 1 cm or more. The size of each cells are around 300 - 500 μm in diameter. Complex rhizoidal system is absent, however, basal cells are firmly attached to the substrate.

The coloration of the macroalgae varies from grass green to bluish.

=== Cells ===
Cells are visible to the naked eye. They are minutely determinate, simple or furcate, and tenacular that are structurally cushioned together. Occasionally, tenacular cells may also function as adventitious rhizoids.

Cells are multinucleated and have numerous discoid chloroplasts. Chloroplasts bear single pyrenoid surrounded by starch sheath and divided to two or more portions by traversing thylakoids.

== Life history ==
The life cycle of Dictyosphaeria exhibits both biphasic and isomorphic alternation of generations. This involves quadriflagellate zoospores, as well as isogamous and biflagellate gametes. Asexual reproduction through thalli fragmentation and possible parthenogenesis of gametes results in smooth surface thalli textures.

In addition, since this macroalgae is a large cell unit, mitotic division and cytokinesis were observed in the development of the zoospores. The unique process of cell division in this genus is observed in a study by Hori and Enomoto (1978). The mitotic spindle is placed centrally at the early course of the zooid differentiation. Prophase nuclei with centrioles were observed to be present during this stage only. Other mitotic stages are observed together in the network cytoplasm

== Distribution and habitat ==
Dictyosphaeria is found in tropical regions in shallow intertidal to subtidal areas. They grow on coral or rocky rubbles in reef flats where they can be the dominant macroalgae.

== Economic use and natural products ==
Dictyosphaeria, particularly the species D. cavernosa, is used for fish bait and animal feed.

Natural products such as the novel metabolite dictyosphaerin, a bicyclic lipid compound were extracted from Dictyosphaeria, particularly D. sericea. This compound is being studied for its potential application in both scientific and medical applications. In addition, Dictyosphearia also harbors microorganisms such as the fungal species that belong to the genus Penicillium. A study by Bugni et al. (2008) has shown that isolated fungal specimens from the species D. versluysii were found to produce novel metabolites including the polyketides dictyosphaeric acids A and B, and the anthraquinone carviolin.

== Ecological and anthropogenic impacts ==
In the Kāne'ohe Bay in Hawai'i, USA, Dictyosphaeria cavernosa is considered an invasive species resulting from continuous discharge of nutrient wastes from coastal communities, as well as reduction in herbivore pressures (such as from fish) in the area. As early as the year 1970, reduced coral cover and increased spatial expansion of D. cavernosa were already documented in the Kaneohe bay area. Invasion of the macroalgae could be attributed to the simultaneous population growth and watershed development as early as the 1960s, including the phase shift on the bay's reef systems.

In a following study, after a steady increase in abundance of D. cavernosa for more than 40 years in the Kāne'ohe Bay, the population suddenly experience a tremendous decrease in cover (Year 2006). This depletion in algal cover appears to be the result of an unusually prolonged cloudy and rainy period. Reduction in irradiance may have caused a decrease in biomass of D. cavernosa in the area. Coral cover remains low due to the physical structure of the reef (unstable rocky substrate) which can be difficult for coral larvae recruits to settle.

Bacterioplankton community structure was also found to be influence by Dictyosphaeria genus, specifically, D. ocellata. When exposed to the macroalgae, the bacterial community structures changes: seven (7) bacterial phylotypes were eliminated, while five (5) phylotypes persisted. Moreover, in the laboratory setting, extracts from D. ocellata where observed to influence the difference in growth rates of bacteria in culture.
