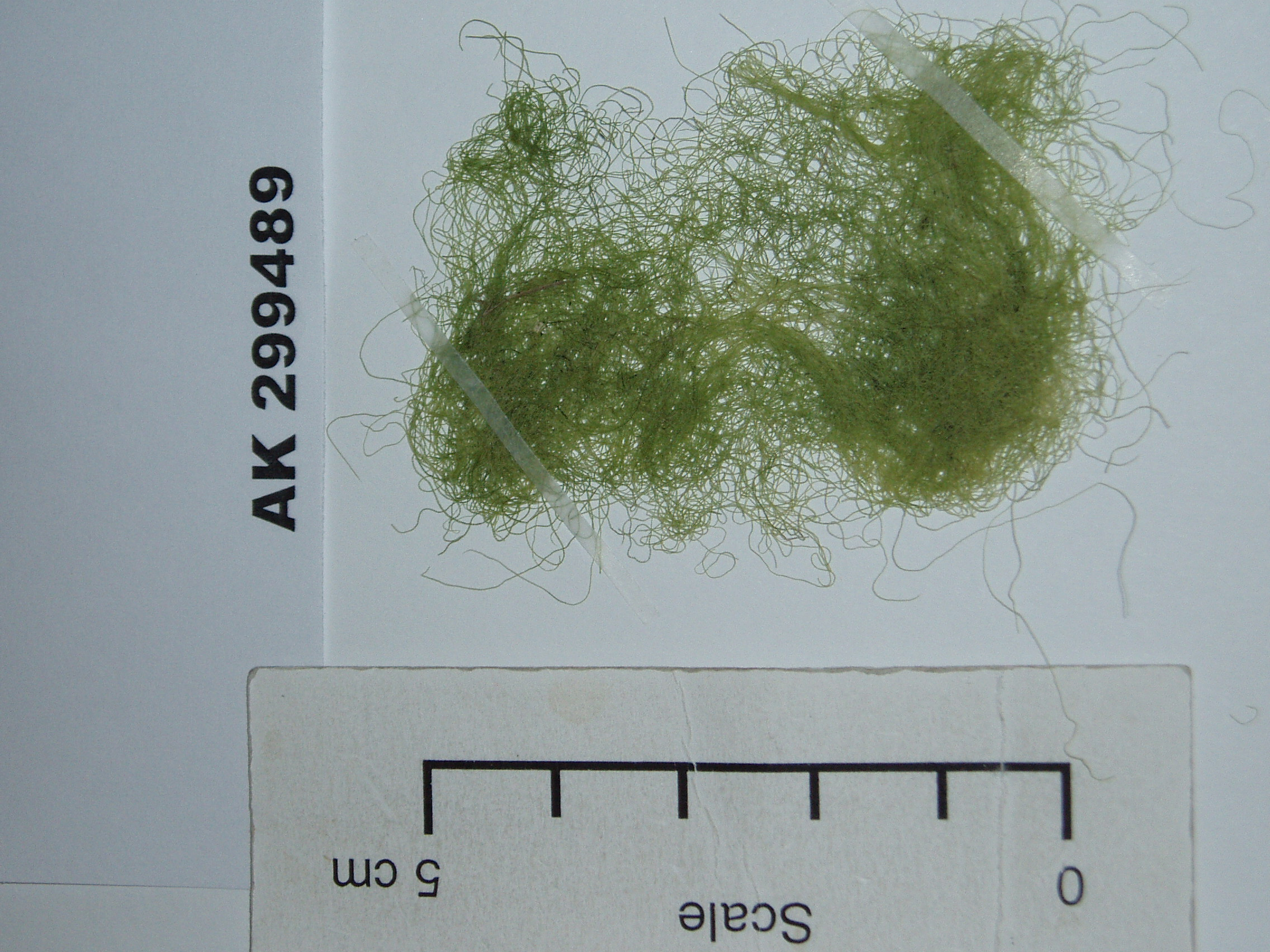
- Rhizoclonium tortuosum

Scientific classification
- Kingdom: Plantae
- Division: Chlorophyta
- Class: Ulvophyceae
- Order: Cladophorales
- Family: Cladophoraceae
- Genus: Rhizoclonium; Kützing

Species
- Rhizoclonium grande; Rhizoclonium hieroglyphicum; Rhizoclonium sp. TKSHCL-1301; Rhizoclonium riparium; Rhizoclonium sp. LB1523

= Rhizoclonium =

Genus of algae

Rhizoclonium is a genus of green algae in the family Cladophoraceae. It is a cosmopolitan genus found in fresh, brackish and marine waters.

== Description ==
Rhizoclonium consists of straight or curved, uniseriate filaments which are usually unbranched. Filaments have short rhizoids which are up to a few cells long, which arise from the sides of filaments or at the ends. Cells are cylindrical, generally 3.5 to 35 μm wide (rarely up to 60 μm wide), with a thin cell wall. Cells are multinucleate, i.e. with multiple (usually two to four) nuclei arranged axially. The chloroplasts are parietal, net-like and with multiple pyrenoids.

Rhizoclonium is capable of both asexual and sexual reproduction. Asexual reproduction occurs by fragmentation of filaments, akinetes, or biflagellate zoospores. Sexual reproduction is isogamous and the gametes are biflagellate, while spores are quadriflagellate.

== Ecology ==
Rhizoclonium inhabits freshwater, brackish, and marine habitats. It is very common in saltmarshes, and may also grow in rock pools and on mud or sand. Many Rhizoclonium species have a broad ecological amplitude, with some strains growing well in salinities ranging from 0.1–34. The genus also displays significant phenotypic plasticity.

== Taxonomy ==
Traditionally, three main genera have been recognized within Cladophoraceae: Cladophora (with branched filaments), Chaetomorpha (with unbranched filaments), and Rhizoclonium (unbranched, with lateral rhizoids). However, molecular phylogenetic studies have revealed that these genera are highly polyphyletic. Taxonomists have reclassified many Rhizoclonium species into other genera, mainly Chaetomorpha and the recently described genus Pseudorhizoclonium.

Species-level delimitation within Rhizoclonium has been challenging. The true diversity of the genus has been both over-estimated (due to phenotypic plasticity leading to over-description of species), and under-estimated (due to cryptic diversity within lineages).
