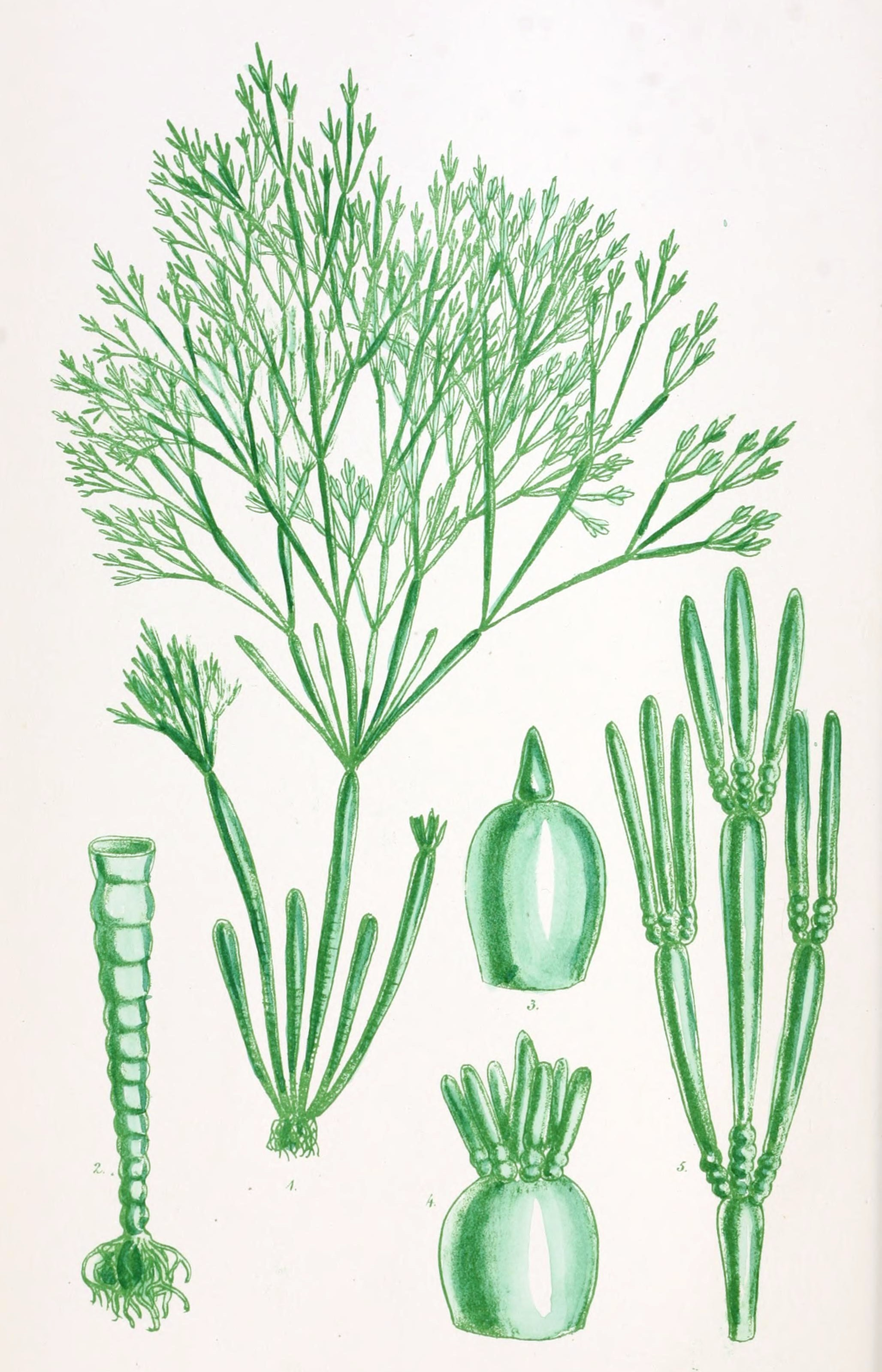
- Apjohnia laetevirens

Scientific classification
- Kingdom: Plantae
- Division: Chlorophyta
- Class: Ulvophyceae
- Order: Cladophorales
- Family: Siphonocladaceae
- Genus: Apjohnia; Harvey

= Apjohnia =

Genus of algae

Apjohnia is a genus of green algae in the family Siphonocladaceae.

The genus name of Apjohnia is in honour of Anne Apjohn, the wife of James Apjohn (1796–1886), the Irish chemist.

== Species ==
As accepted by WoRMS;

- Apjohnia laetevirens Harvey, 1855
- Apjohnia scoparia (Kützing) Valet, 1997

Former species;

- A. rugulosa (G.Martens) G.Murray, 1891 now accepted as synonym of Cladophora prolifera (Roth) Kützing, 1843
- A. tropica P.Crouan & H.Crouan, 1865 accepted as synonym of Siphonocladus tropicus (P.Crouan & H.Crouan) J.Agardh, 1887
