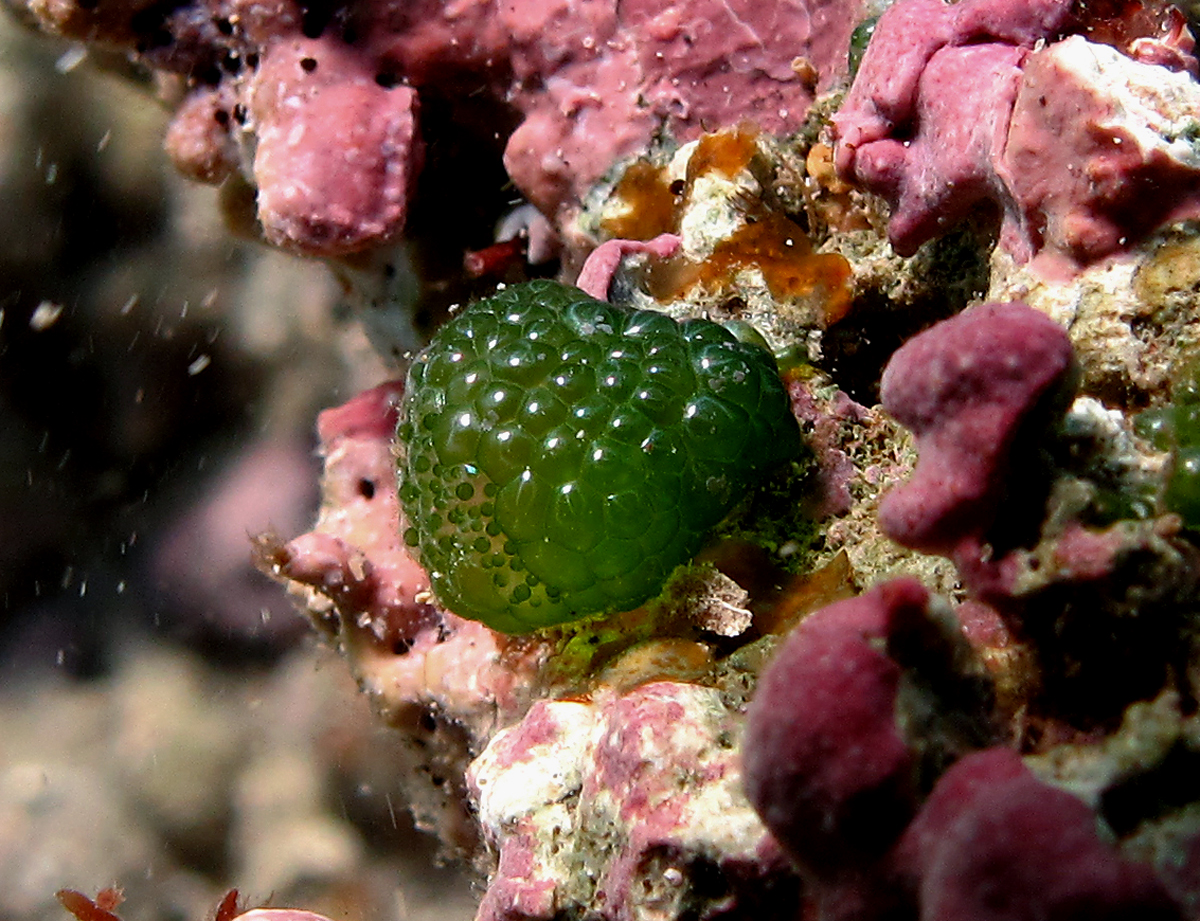

Scientific classification
- Kingdom: Plantae
- Division: Chlorophyta
- Class: Ulvophyceae
- Order: Cladophorales
- Family: Siphonocladaceae
- Genus: Dictyosphaeria
- Species: D. cavernosa

Binomial name
- Dictyosphaeria cavernosa (Forsskål) Børgesen

= Dictyosphaeria cavernosa =

Species of algae

Dictyosphaeria cavernosa is a species of green algae (class Ulvophyceae) in the family Siphonocladaceae, one of the three species in this family. Its common name is green bubble seaweed.

Dictyospharea cavernosa is multicellular with multiple bumps or bubbles on the surface. Dictyosphaeria cavernosa is hollow in contrast to its sister species D. versluysii of the same appearance which is solid. It grows about 12cm in diameter and possesses a green-yellow color while young.

== Distribution and habitat ==
It is found all over the world especially in South-East Asia. Dictyosphaeria can be found on rocks in the shallow reef areas. On the island of Oahu they are found in the Kaneohe Bay area. The sewage system had a huge role in the growth of the algae in Kaneohe Bay.

== Description and biology ==
Dictyosphaeria cavernosa is usually found in the crevices of rock formations around rocky tidal pools. It may look like a green rock at first, but it is a Dictyosphaeria cavernosa. Green bubble algae can spread rapidly due to access of nutrients. The green algae has a few times out of the year where they grow abundantly.

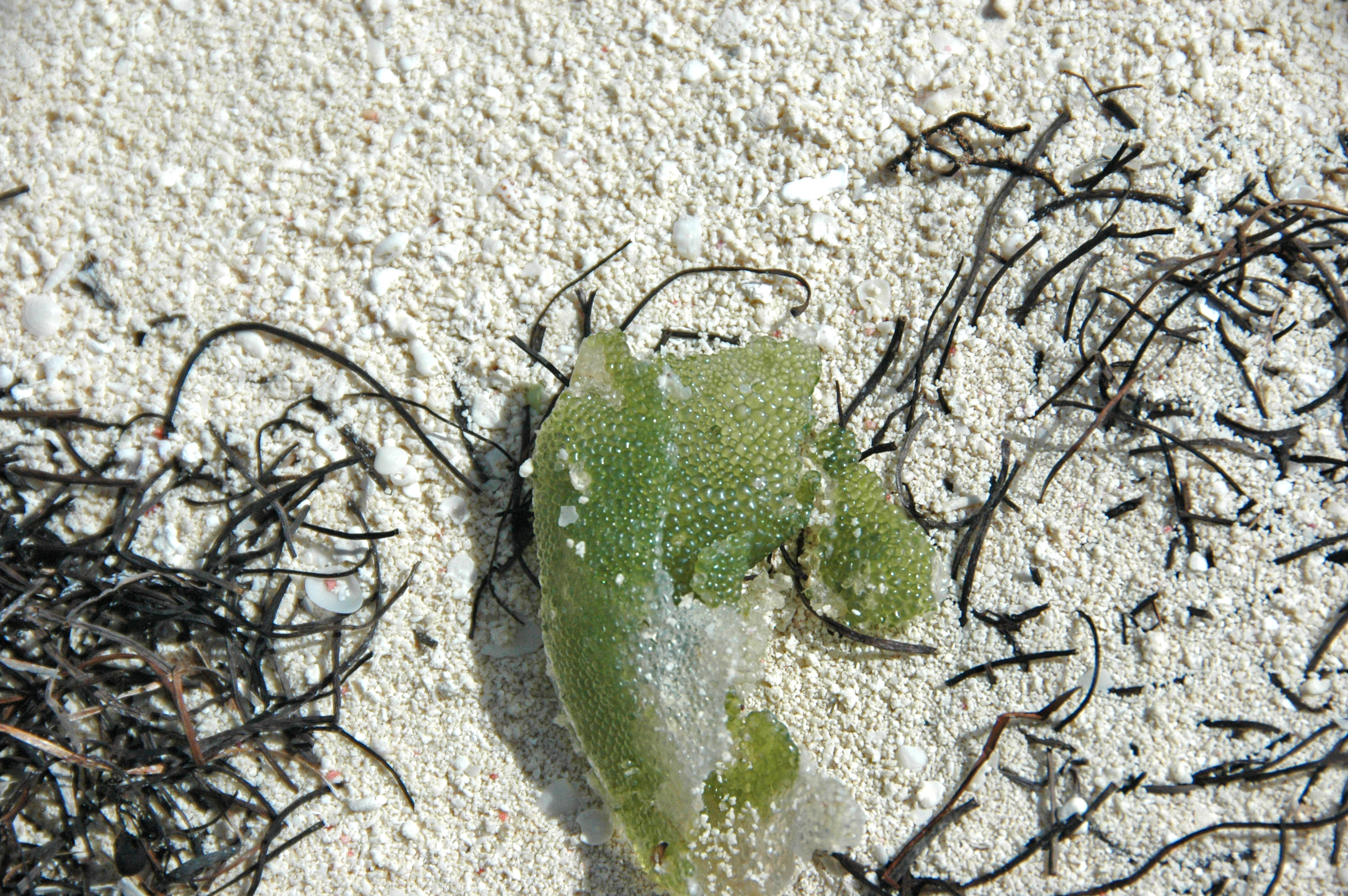

== Environmental impact ==
During the 1960-1970's there was in increase in sewage discharge and the nutrients found in the sewage water is the primary source for the bubble seaweed to grow. With a massive sewage discharge entering the ocean allowing the nutrients became a source for the green algae. This algae is harmful to the coral reefs due it spreading and covering the reef in a thick layer killing the reef and other organisms. Scientists have been studying the physical, biological, and chemical aspects of the reefs to find ways to reduce the growth of the algae. Declining the source of nutrients for the algae reduced the growth by 1977.
