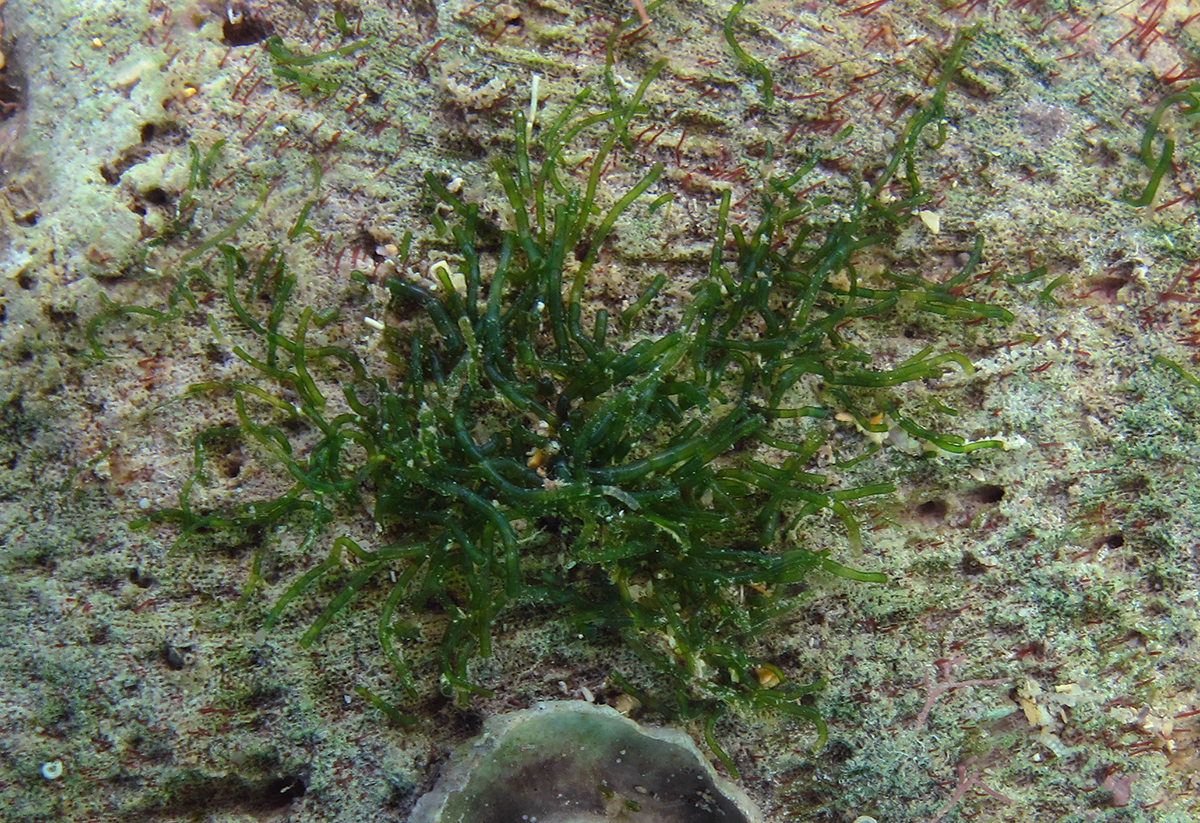
- Cladophoropsis sundanensis

Scientific classification
- Clade: Viridiplantae
- Division: Chlorophyta
- Class: Ulvophyceae
- Order: Cladophorales
- Family: Boodleaceae
- Genus: Cladophoropsis; Børgesen

Species
- Cladophoropsis membranacea; Cladophoropsis zollingerii; Cladophoropsis fasciculatus; Cladophoropsis vaucheriiformis; Cladophoropsis macromeres; Cladophoropsis sundanensis; Cladophoropsis herpestica; Cladophoropsis philippinensis; C. sp. Vopsis 4 (F245)

= Cladophoropsis =

Genus of algae

Cladophoropsis is a genus of green algae in the family Boodleaceae.
