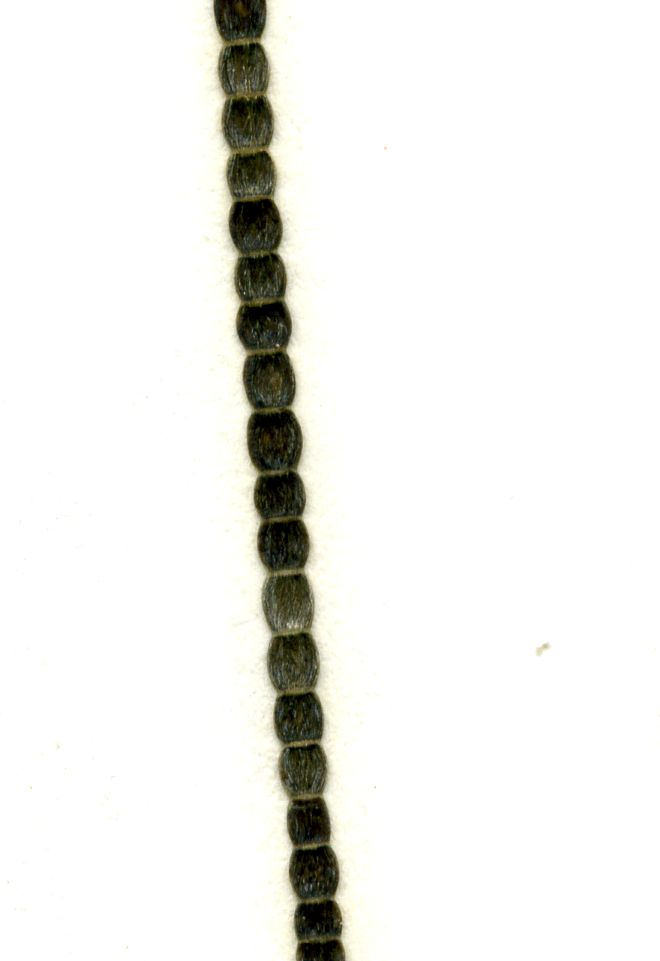
- Detail of a strand of Chaetomorpha melagonium dried in an herbarium

Scientific classification
- Clade: Viridiplantae
- Division: Chlorophyta
- Class: Ulvophyceae
- Order: Cladophorales
- Family: Cladophoraceae
- Genus: Chaetomorpha
- Species: C. melagonium

Binomial name
- Chaetomorpha melagonium (F.Weber & D.Mohr) Kützing, 1845

= Chaetomorpha melagonium =

Species of alga

Chaetomorpha melagonium is a species of green algae of the family Cladophoraceae.

There is confusion as to whether there are two forms of this species - one attached and one unattached.

== Description ==
The attached form is unbranched growing solitary or in a small group to 60 cm long. The filaments are attached at the base and are stiff and straight. In colour they are dark green with a glaucus sheen. Remarkably rigid and wiry. The cells are so large they can be seen with naked eye.

== Habitat ==
Rock pools of the low littoral. Never abundant, but widespread.

== Distribution ==
Widespread around the British Isles, along the Atlantic shores of Europe, Murman Sea, Greenland, Canadian Arctic.
