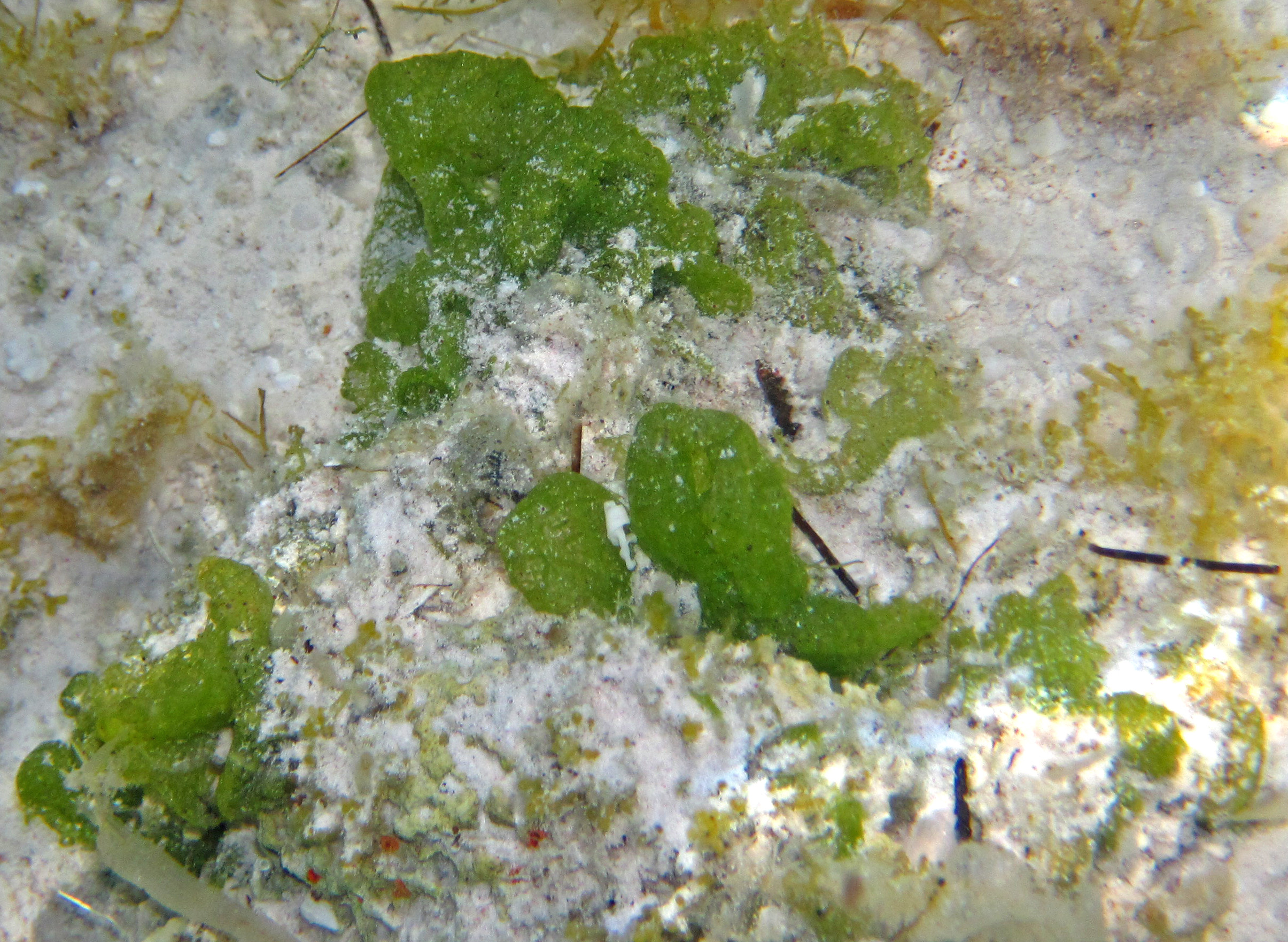
- Microdictyon marinum on shallow, aragonitic sandy seafloor just offshore from Sand Dollar Beach & just south of Rocky Point, northwestern San Salvador Island, eastern Bahamas

Scientific classification
- Kingdom: Plantae
- Division: Chlorophyta
- Class: Ulvophyceae
- Order: Cladophorales
- Family: Anadyomenaceae; Kützing

Genera
- Anadyomene; Microdictyon

= Anadyomenaceae =

Family of algae

Anadyomenaceae is a family of green algae, in the order Cladophorales.
