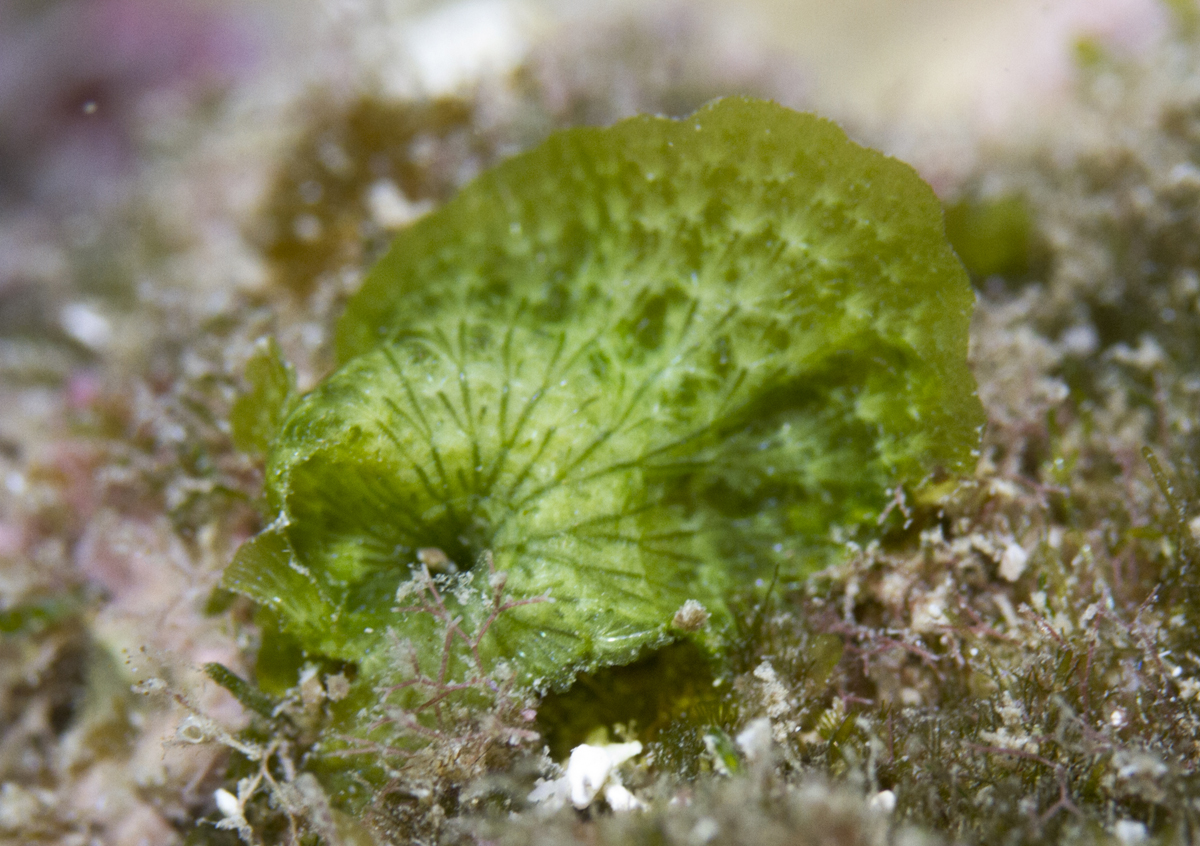
- Anadyomene wrightii in Réunion

Scientific classification
- Kingdom: Plantae
- Division: Chlorophyta
- Class: Ulvophyceae
- Order: Cladophorales
- Family: Anadyomenaceae
- Genus: Anadyomene; J.V. Lamouroux, 1812

Species
- Anadyomene aruensis; Anadyomene brownii; Anadyomene circumsepta; Anadyomene crispa; Anadyomene eseptata; Anadyomene flabellata; Anadyomene howei; Anadyomene lacerata; Anadyomene leclancheri; Anadyomene lenormandii; Anadyomene linkiana; Anadyomene menziesii; Anadyomene muelleri; Anadyomene pavonina; Anadyomene plicata; Anadyomene rhizoidifera; Anadyomene saldanhae; Anadyomene stellata; Anadyomene wrightii

= Anadyomene (alga) =

Genus of algae

Anadyomene is a genus of thalloid green algae comprising 19 species. Specimens can reach around 25 centimetres (9.8 in) in size.

== Species ==
The valid species currently considered to belong to this genus are:

- A. aruensis
- A. brownii
- A. circumsepta
- A. crispa
- A. eseptata
- A. flabellata
- A. howei
- A. lacerata
- A. leclancheri
- A. lenormandii
- A. linkiana
- A. menziesii
- A. muelleri
- A. pavonina
- A. plicata
- A. rhizoidifera
- A. saldanhae
- A. stellata
- A. wrightii
