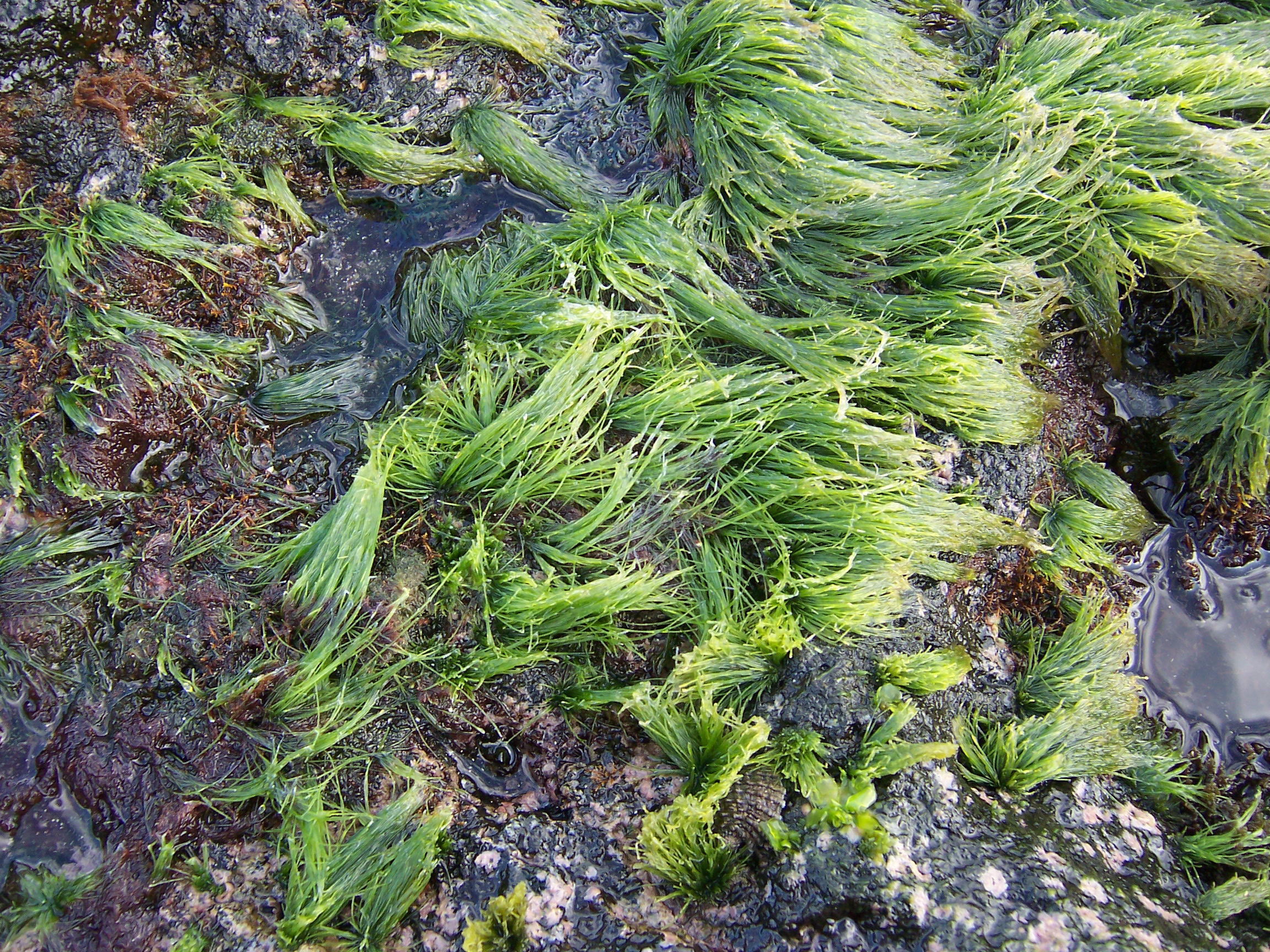
- Chaetomorpha antennina

Scientific classification
- Kingdom: Plantae
- Division: Chlorophyta
- Class: Ulvophyceae
- Order: Cladophorales
- Family: Cladophoraceae
- Genus: Chaetomorpha; Kützing

Type species
- Chaetomorpha melagonium (F.Weber & D.Mohr) Kützing

Species
- See text

= Chaetomorpha =

Genus of algae

Chaetomorpha is a genus of green algae in the family Cladophoraceae. Members of this genus may be referred to by the common name sea emerald.

== Description ==
Algae of this genus are made up of macroscopic filaments which are uniseriate (one cell thick) and unbranched. Cells are cylindrical to barrel-shaped, multinucleate, with thick cell walls. The chloroplast is parietal and net-like, with many pyrenoids.

The genus is characterized by its unbranched filaments, making it distinctive; its closest relatives are branching species of the genus Cladophora.

Asexual reproduction occurs by biflagellate or quadriflagellate zoospores, or by the fragmentation of filaments. Sexual reproduction is isogamous, and involves biflagellate gametes.

== Habitat ==
Chaetomorpha is probably cosmopolitan. It occurs in marine or brackish waters, and very rarely in freshwater. A few species of freshwater Chaetomorpha have been described, but their taxonomic placement within Chaetophora is doubtful.

== Species ==
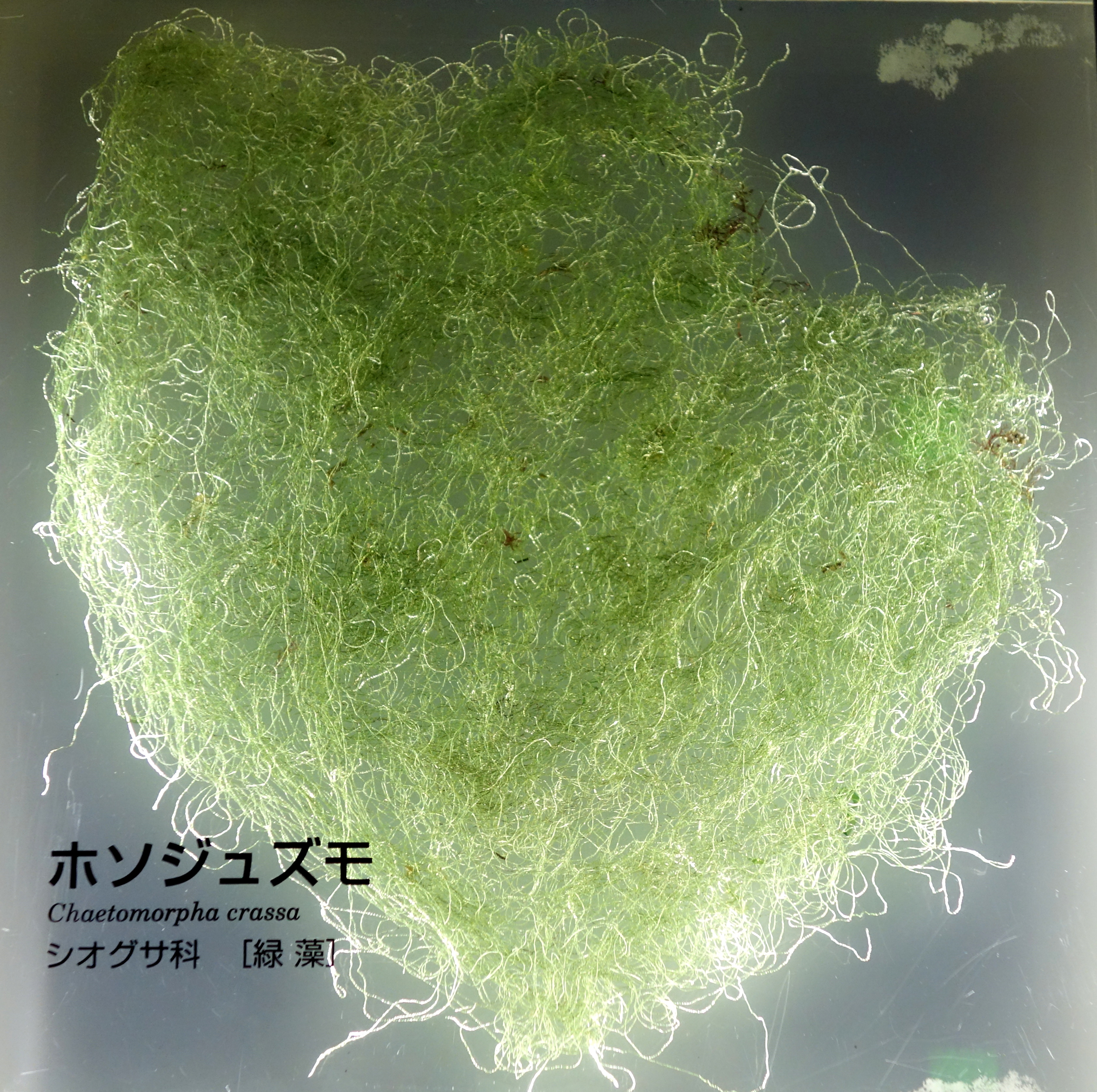
Chaetomorpha crassa

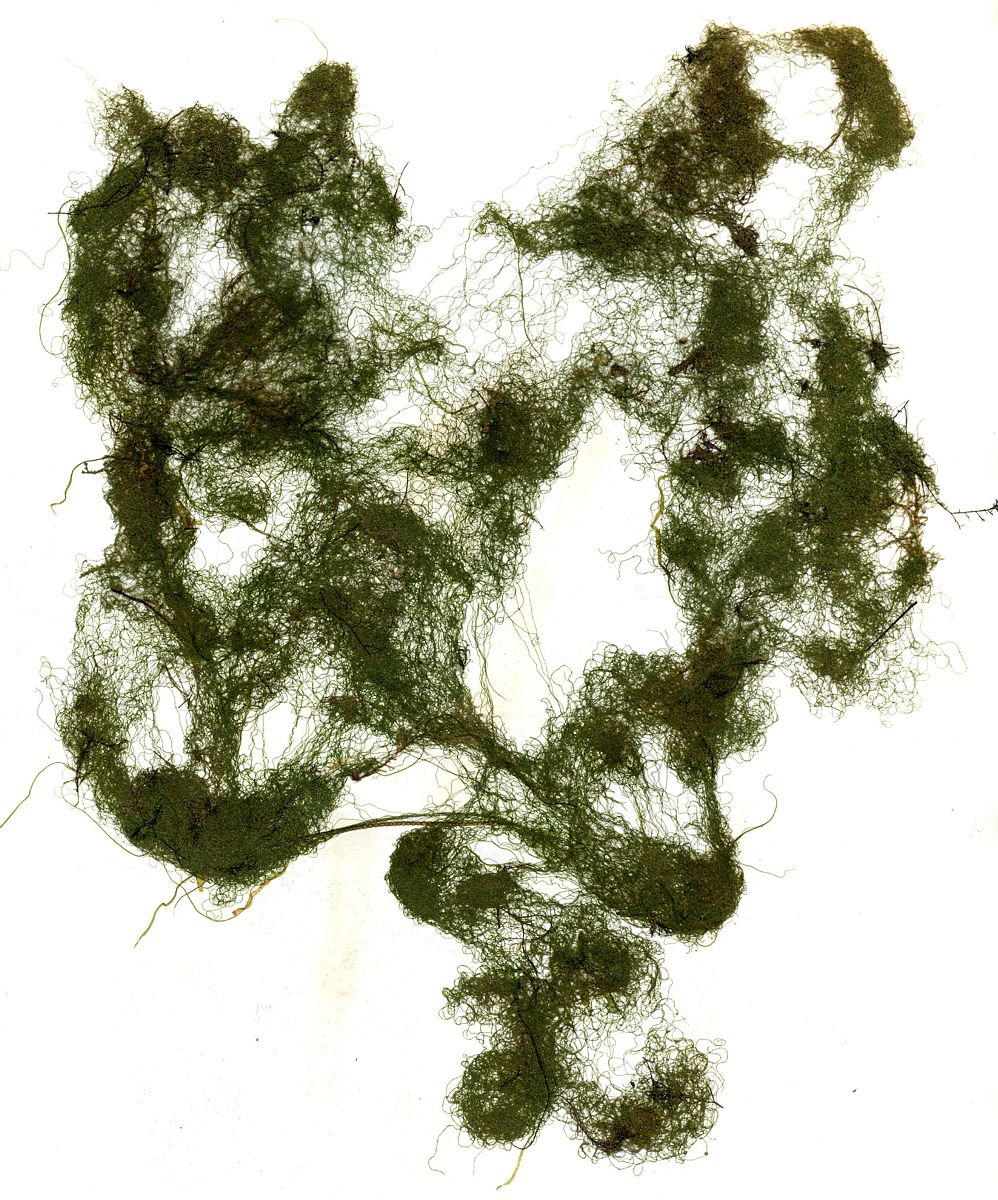
Chaetomorpha ligustica

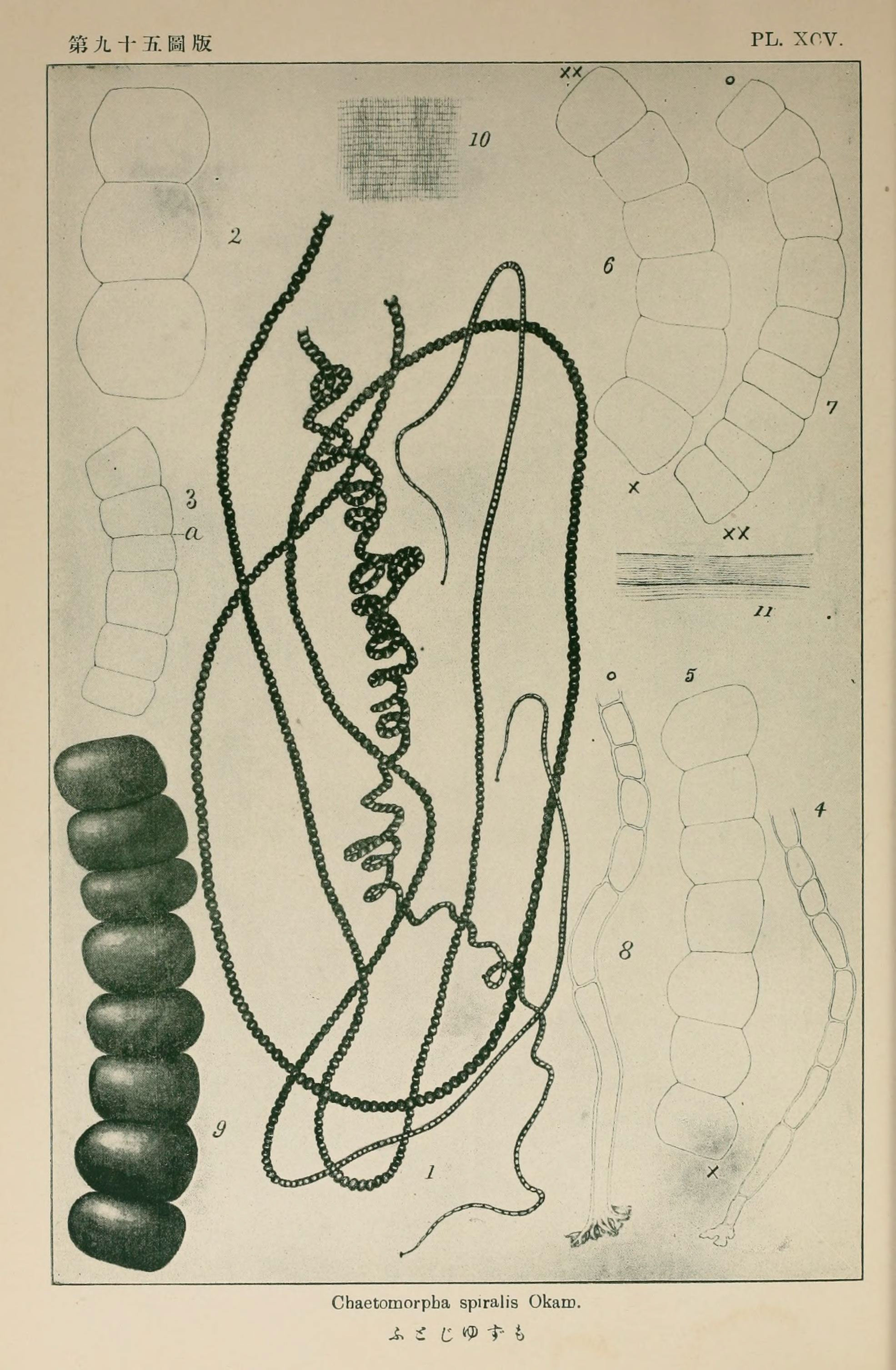
Chaetomorpha spiralis illustration

There are about 50 species. Species include:

- Chaetomorpha adriani
- Chaetomorpha aerea
- Chaetomorpha akineta
- Chaetomorpha antennina
- Chaetomorpha bangioides
- Chaetomorpha basiretrorsa
- Chaetomorpha billardierii
- Chaetomorpha brachygona
- Chaetomorpha californica
- Chaetomorpha cannabina
- Chaetomorpha capillaris
- Chaetomorpha dubyana
- Chaetomorpha elongata
- Chaetomorpha exposita
- Chaetomorpha fibrosa
- Chaetomorpha firma
- Chaetomorpha geniculata
- Chaetomorpha gracilis
- Chaetomorpha henningsii
- Chaetomorpha herbipolensis
- Chaetomorpha intestinalis
- Chaetomorpha irregularis
- Chaetomorpha javanica
- Chaetomorpha kellersii
- Chaetomorpha kerguelensis
- Chaetomorpha ligustica
- Chaetomorpha linoides
- Chaetomorpha linum
- Chaetomorpha macrotona
- Chaetomorpha mawsonii
- Chaetomorpha mediterranea
- Chaetomorpha melagonium
- Chaetomorpha natalensis
- Chaetomorpha nodosa
- Chaetomorpha obscura
- Chaetomorpha ochlophobians
- Chaetomorpha olneyi
- Chaetomorpha pachynema
- Chaetomorpha pacifica
- Chaetomorpha picquotiana
- Chaetomorpha recurva
- Chaetomorpha restricta
- Chaetomorpha saccata
- Chaetomorpha septentrionalis
- Chaetomorpha tenuissima
- Chaetomorpha tokyoensis
- Chaetomorpha tortuosa
- Chaetomorpha valida
- Chaetomorpha vieillardii
- Chaetomorpha zernovii

== Uses ==
These algae are popular with aquarium hobbyists. Dumping of aquarium specimens into waterways has led to the establishment of nonnative Chaetomorpha populations, which degrades ecosystems when the algae become invasive species. Biologists recommend boiling, microwaving, freezing, or desiccating aquarium Chaetomorpha before disposing of it to avoid inadvertent releases.
