= Spongiochrysis =

Scientific classification
- Kingdom: Plantae
- Division: Chlorophyta
- Class: Ulvophyceae
- Order: Cladophorales
- Family: Cladophoraceae
- Genus: Spongiochrysis; Rindi, J.López-Bautista, A.R.Sherwood & Guiry
- Species: S. hawaiiensis

Binomial name
- Spongiochrysis hawaiiensis Rindi, J.López-Bautista, A.R.Sherwood & Guiry

Genus of algae

Spongiochrysis is a genus of green algae in the family Cladophorales. It contains a single species, Spongiochrysis hawaiiensis.

Spongiochrysis hawaiiensis is a terrestrial alga that forms golden-yellow crusts on Casuarina bark.
