= Siphonocladus =

Scientific classification
- Kingdom: Plantae
- Division: Chlorophyta
- Class: Ulvophyceae
- Order: Cladophorales
- Family: Siphonocladaceae
- Genus: Siphonocladus; F.Schmitz

Species
- Siphonocladus pusillus; Siphonocladus rigidus; Siphonocladus tropicus

Genus of algae

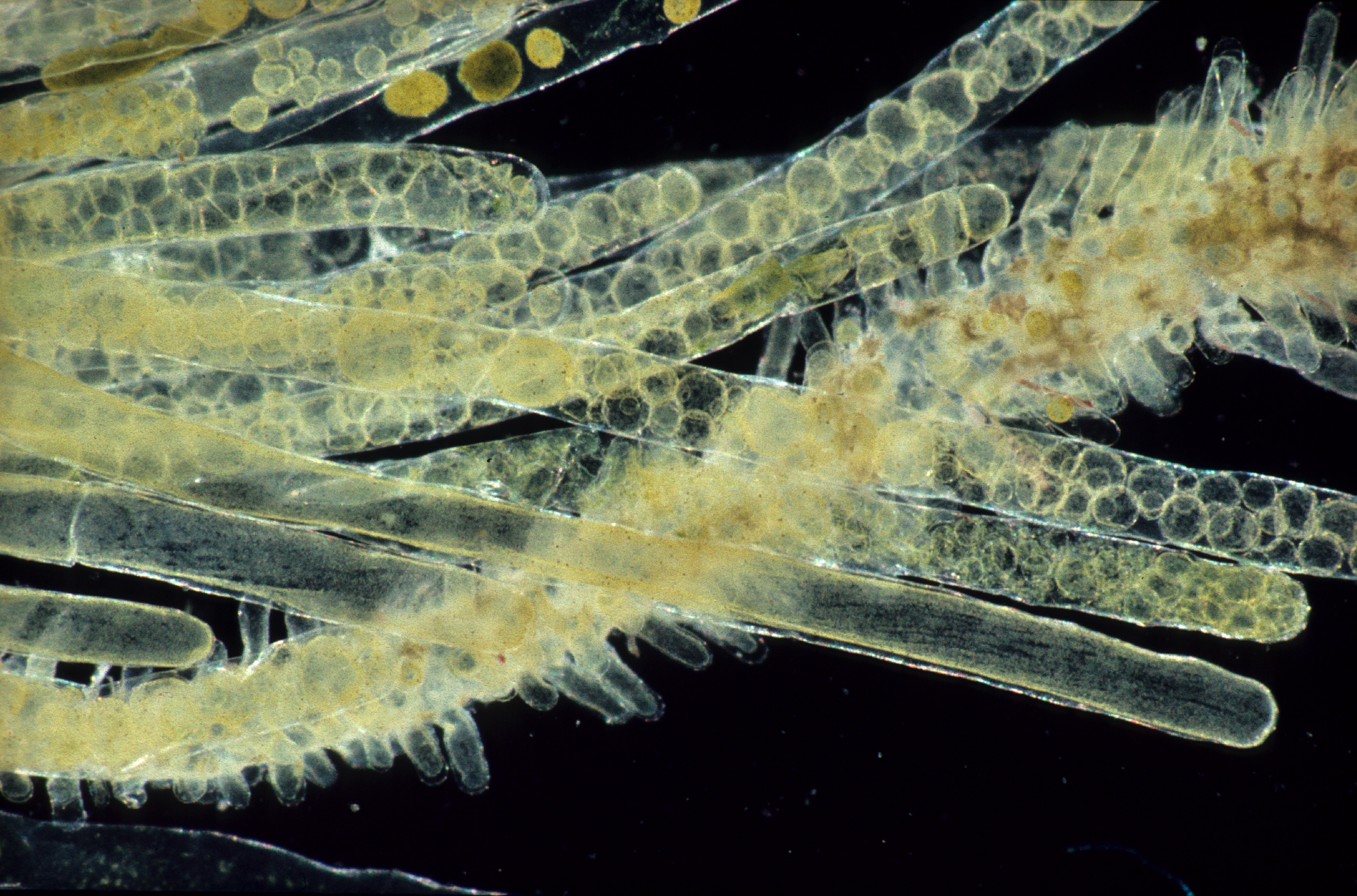
Siphonocladus tropicus showing segregative cell division.

Siphonocladus is a small genus of green algae in the family Siphonocladaceae. The algal body (thallus) is composed of long, club-shaped cells that divide by segregative cell division, followed by the formation of branches that break through the mother cell.

As in other members of the order Cladophorales, cells are multinucleate.

The genus occurs in subtropical or tropical seas, in shallow intertidal and subtidal habitats. Most species are rare.
