= Phyllodictyon =

Scientific classification
- Clade: Viridiplantae
- Division: Chlorophyta
- Class: Ulvophyceae
- Order: Cladophorales
- Family: Boodleaceae
- Genus: Phyllodictyon; J.E.Gray

Species
- Phyllodictyon anastomosans; Phyllodictyon pulcherrimum; Phyllodictyon orientale; Phyllodictyon papuensis

Genus of algae

Phyllodictyon is a genus of green algae in the family Boodleaceae.
