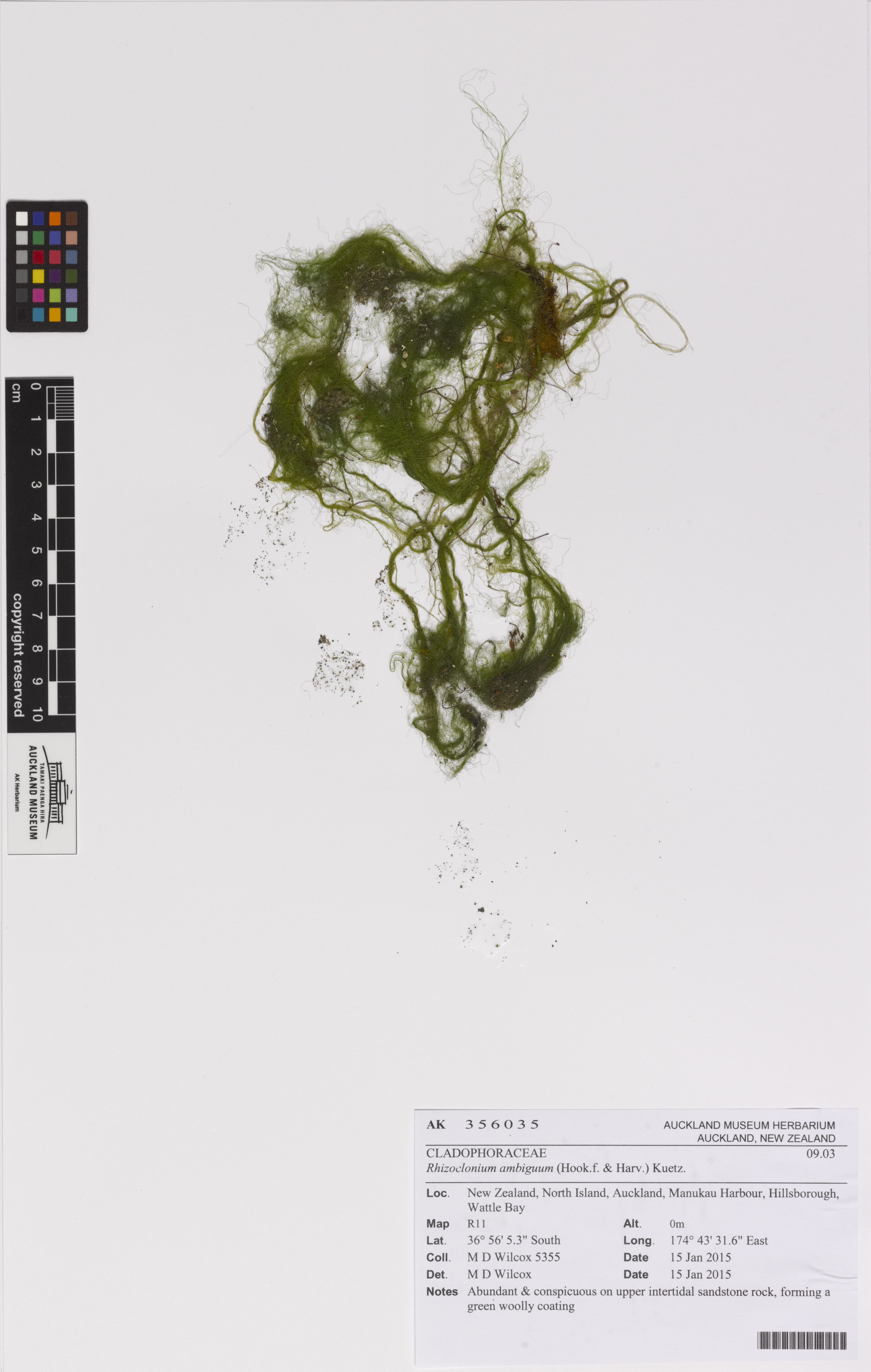
- Pseudorhizoclonium africanum

Scientific classification
- Kingdom: Plantae
- Division: Chlorophyta
- Class: Ulvophyceae
- Order: Cladophorales
- Family: Cladophoraceae
- Genus: Pseudorhizoclonium; Boedeker, 2016

Type species
- Pseudorhizoclonium africanum (Kützing) Boedeker

Species
- See text

= Pseudorhizoclonium =

Genus of algae

Pseudorhizoclonium is a genus of algae in the Cladophoraceae family.

== Taxonomy ==
According to AlgaeBase, in 2021 there were ten taxonomically accepted species under this genus based on listed literature.

- Pseudorhizoclonium africanum (Kützing) Boedeker
- Pseudorhizoclonium australe Boedeker, Leliaert & A.R.Sherwood
- Pseudorhizoclonium fractum (Ichihara & Miyaji) Boedeker, Leliaert & A.R.Sherwood
- Pseudorhizoclonium hawaiiense A.R.Sherwoods, Boedeker & Leliaert
- Pseudorhizoclonium mangroviorum Boedeker, Leliaert & A.R.Sherwood
- Pseudorhizoclonium minutissimum (Zeller) Boedeker, Leliaert & A.R.Sherwood
- Pseudorhizoclonium philippinense Leliaert, Bodeker & A.R.Sherwood
- Pseudorhizoclonium rhizophilum (W.R.Taylor) Boedeker
- Pseudorhizoclonium subaerophilum A.R.Sherwood, Boedeker & Leliaert
- Pseudorhizoclonium umbraticum (Ichihara & Miyaji) Boedeker, Leliaert & A.R.Sherwood

== Morphology ==
Boedeker et al. in their 2016 manuscript recognized the green algal genus Pseudorhizoclonium as a separate clade from Rhizoclonium sensu stricto based on molecular data. This resulted to the transfer of R. africanum and R. rhizophilum W.R.Taylor to the genus Pseudorhizoclonium. According to Sherwood et al., Pseudorhizoclonium may appear as bunches or mats of relatively straight or curled filaments, forming intertwined strands and woolly masses in the upper intertidal. Boedeker et al. (2016) observed the morphological features of Pseudorhizoclonium of larger cell dimensions and shorter cells than Rhizoclonium, the presence of a basal cell and small holdfast, the variable presence or absence of intercalary/lateral rhizoids, the presence of sharp-angled bends in filaments (termed ‘knees’), very thick cell walls in field-collected material, and more nuclei per cell than Rhizoclonium. Sherwood et al. affirmed in their paper that the only definitive character that distinguishes Pseudorhizoclonium from Rhizoclonium is the larger number of nuclei per cell. Their findings also revealed that there was a substantial overlap in the morphological characteristics of the species belonging to Pseudorhizoclonium where a certain character may be distinct for some species and absent in some.

== Distribution and ecology ==
Based on the Global Biodiversity Information Facility, there are 213 georeferenced records for the genus. According to Sherwood et al. (2019), literatures reported either as Pseudorhizoclonium or Rhizoclonium lineage coming from tropical and subtropical areas like South America, Central America, East African coast, Southern Asia and the Pacific and Australia and New Zealand. These include French Polynesia, Brazil, Japan, Australia, United States of America, Mexico, Puerto Rico, Thailand, Guyana, Bermuda, Saudi Arabia, Portugal, Dominican Republic, Ghana, Papua New Guinea, Costa Rica, Micronesia, Jamaica, Panama, Colombia, Indonesia, and Ecuador.

The environment where this genus thrives ranges from marine, brackish, freshwater streams to terrestrial areas. The identified habitats based on Boedeker et al. in 2016 were mangroves, lagoons and high intertidal areas. This leads to the assumption that this genus can survive and adapt to areas of changing salinity, brackish habitats and desiccation-tolerant. According to Sherwood et al., this genus represents an independent case of transition from marine into freshwater and terrestrial environments in the Cladophorales. The unusual high tolerance for fluctuating environmental conditions can be a factor to the remarkable number of habitat transitions observed within the genus.

== Chemistry ==
Dias et al., in their study analyzed the methanolic extract of 8 seaweeds species including Pseudorhizoclonium africanum. The phytochemical analysis yields P. africanum for the presence of Flavanones and condensed tannins. Its chemical analysis indicated the presence of 11-Octadecenoic acid, methyl ester, 12-Methyl-E,E-2,13-octadecadien-1-ol, 17-Octadecynoic acid, 1-Heptatriacotanol, 6,10,14-trimethyl- 2-Pentadecanone, 7,10-He1adecadienoic acid, methyl ester, (Z,Z,Z)-8,11,14-Eicosatrienoic acid, (Z,Z,Z)-9,12,15-Octadecatrienoic acid, 9,12-Octadecadienoic acid (Z,Z)-, methyl ester, 9-Nonadecene, Cholesterol, methyl ester, (all Z)-Eicosatetraenoic acid, Heptadecane, He1adecanoic acid, methyl ester, Neophytadiene, n-He1adecanoic acid, Oleic Acid, Phytol, Phytol acetate, Stigmastan-3,5-diene, Tetracosanoic acid, methyl ester, Tetradecane, 2,6,10-trimethyl-, Tetradecanoic acid, Z-(13,14-Epo1y)tetradec-11-en-1-ol acetate, Z-5-Nonadecene, Z-8-Methyl-9-tetradecenoic acid.
