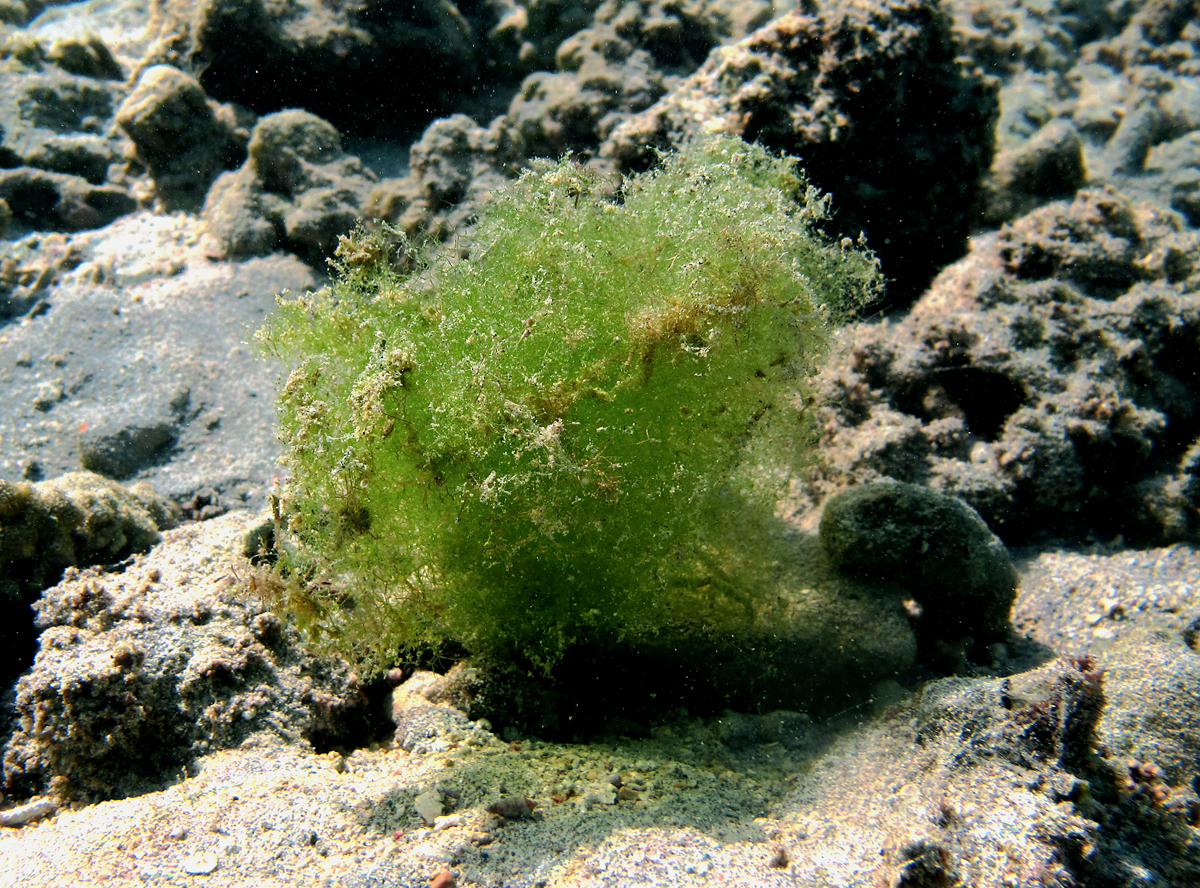
- Boodlea

Scientific classification
- Clade: Viridiplantae
- Division: Chlorophyta
- Class: Ulvophyceae
- Order: Cladophorales
- Family: Boodleaceae; Børgesen

Genera
- Boodlea; Cladophoropsis; Nereodictyon; Phyllodictyon; Struvea; Struveopsis

= Boodleaceae =

Family of algae

Boodleaceae is a family of green algae in the order Cladophorales.
