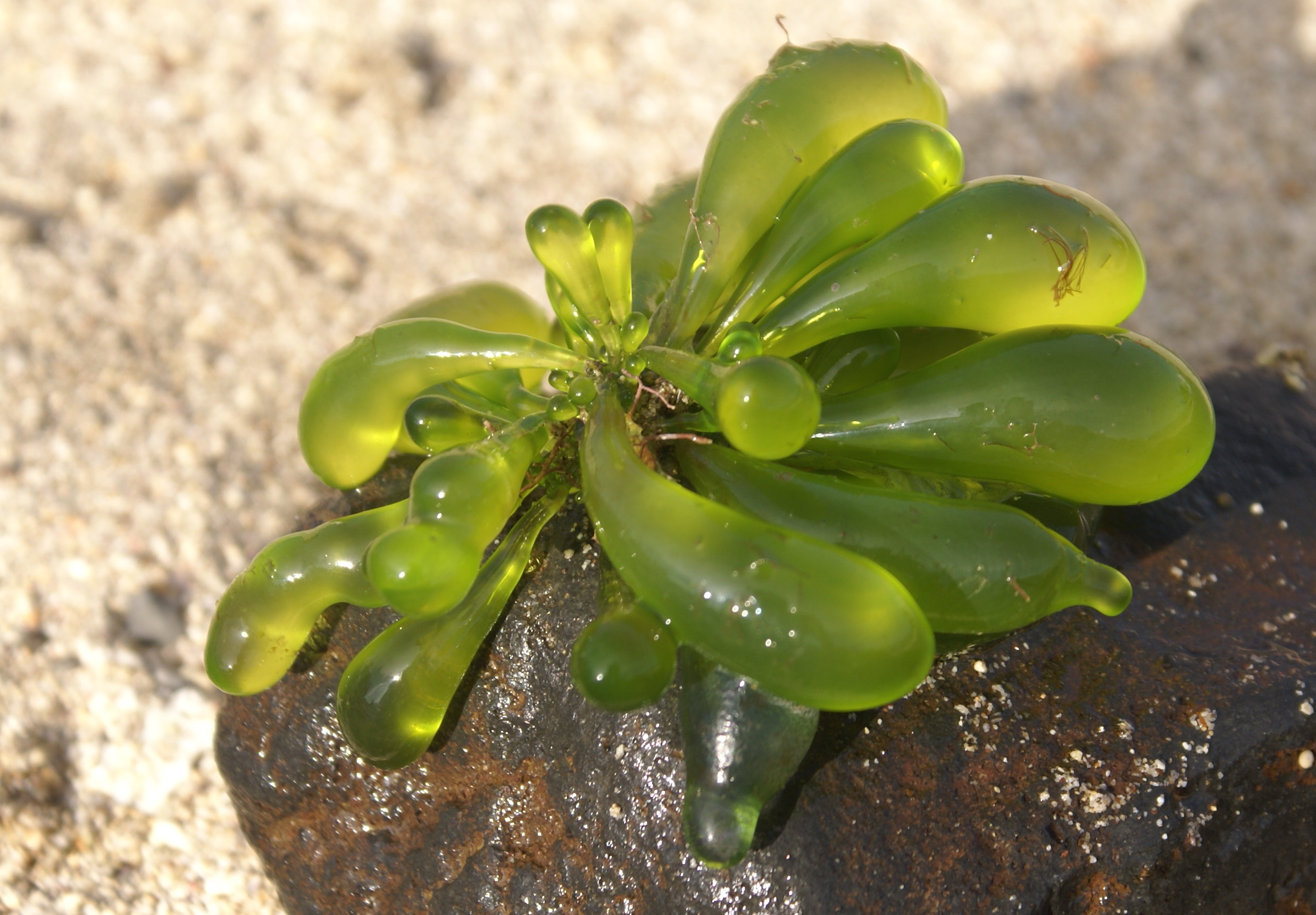
- Boergesenia forbesii

Scientific classification
- Domain: Eukaryota
- Clade: Archaeplastida
- Clade: Viridiplantae
- Division: Chlorophyta
- Class: Ulvophyceae
- Order: Cladophorales
- Family: Siphonocladaceae; F.Schmitz

Genera
- Apjohnia; Boergesenia; Chamaedoris; Dictyosphaeria; Ernodesmis; Siphonocladus

= Siphonocladaceae =

Family of algae

Siphonocladaceae is a family of green algae, in the order Cladophorales.
