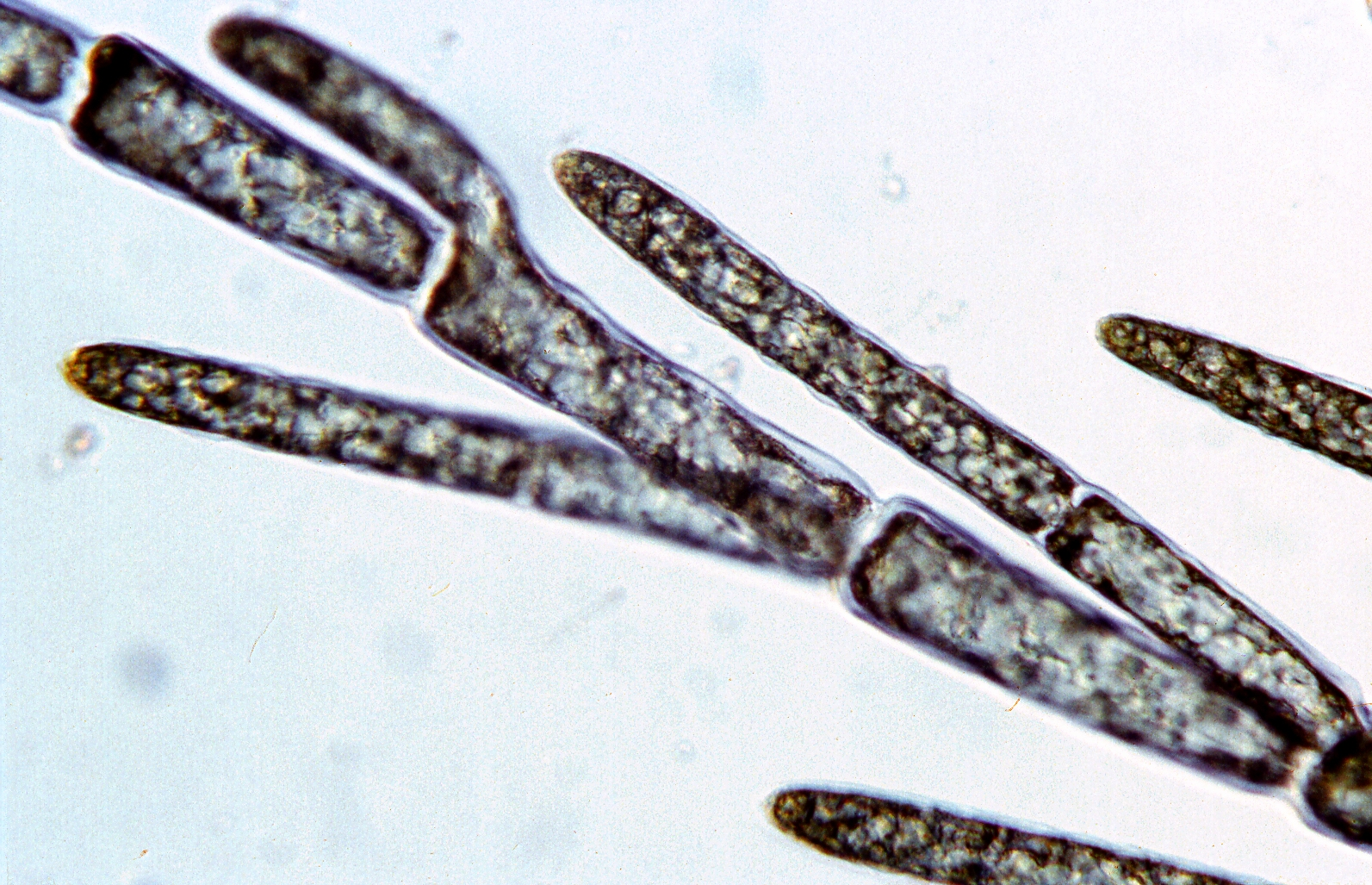
- Cladophora sp.

Scientific classification
- Kingdom: Plantae
- Division: Chlorophyta
- Class: Ulvophyceae
- Order: Cladophorales
- Family: Cladophoraceae; Wille

Genera
- Bryobesia; Chaetomorpha; Chloropteris; Cladophora; †Cladophorites; Lurbica; Lychaete; Pseudorhizoclonium; Rama; Rhizoclonium; †Rhizophyton; Spongiochrysis; Vandenhoekia; Willeella

= Cladophoraceae =

Family of algae

Cladophoraceae are a family of green algae in the order the Cladophorales. This family includes notably the genus Chaetomorpha which has a few members used in saltwater aquariums.

Members of the Cladophoraceae are mostly found in marine or brackish habitats; a few taxa are found in freshwater habitats.

== Description ==
Cladophoraceae consists of filaments that are uniseriate (one cell thick), which may be free-floating or attached to a substrate. Filaments may be unbranched, sparsely branched, or profusely branched. Some genera, such as Rhizoclonium, produce colorless rhizoid cells. Some species like Willeella ordinata have regular, opposite branches aligned in one plane, which create a feather-like appearance.

Reproduction occurs vegetatively, asexually, and sexually. Vegetative reproduction occurs by fragmentation of filaments. Asexual reproduction occurs via zoospores, which are biflagellate or quadriflagellate. Sexual reproduction is isomorphic and diplohaplontic, involving alternating sporophyte and gametophyte generations which are morphologically identical. Gametes are biflagellate, and meiospores are quadriflagellate.

== Taxonomy ==
Classification of Cladophoraceae has been very difficult, because the few morphological characters are often obscured by phenotypic plasticity and convergent evolution; therefore, many taxa are cryptic. Traditionally, three main genera have been recognized: Cladophora (with branched filaments), Chaetomorpha (with unbranched filaments), and Rhizoclonium (unbranched, with lateral rhizoids). However, molecular phylogenetic studies have revealed that these genera are highly polyphyletic. Taxonomists have begun to reclassify species in Cladophoraceae based mainly on phylogeny to maintain monophyly, but this means that the genera are morphologically ill-defined.

Phylogenetic relationships within Cladophoraceae are as follows (not all genera are included):

- - Pithophoraceae (outgroup)
  - - Lychaete
    - - - Vandenhoekia
        - - Willeella
          - - Lurbica
            - Pseudorhizoclonium
      - - Chaetomorpha melagonium
        - - - Rama
            - Chaetomorpha
          - - Cladophora
            - Rhizoclonium
