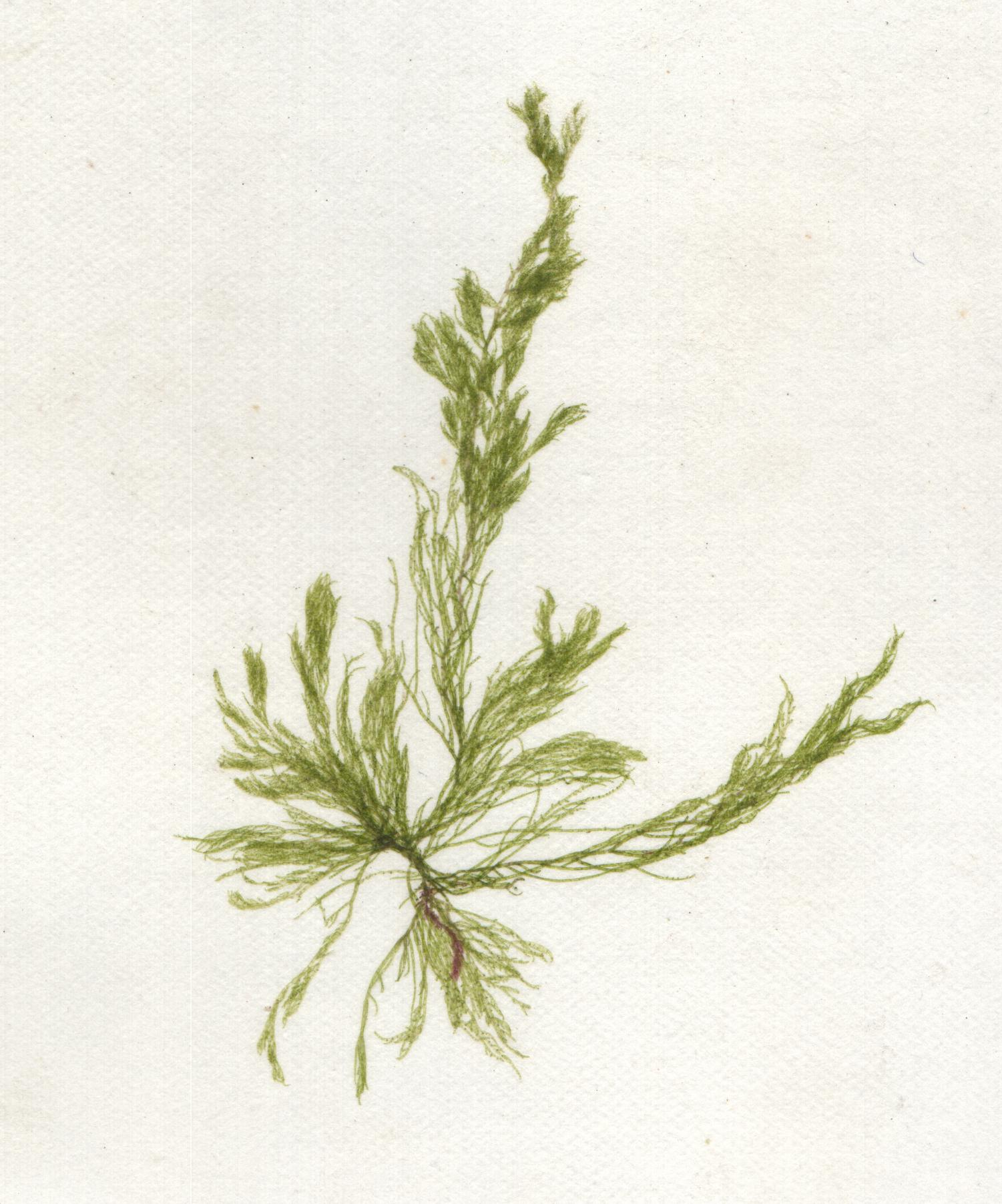
- Cladophora sp.

Scientific classification
- Kingdom: Plantae
- Division: Chlorophyta
- Class: Ulvophyceae
- Order: Cladophorales; Haeckel

Families
- Anadyomenaceae; Boodleaceae; Cladophoraceae; Okellyaceae; Pithophoraceae; Pseudocladophoraceae; Siphonocladaceae; Valoniaceae

Synonyms
- Siphonocladales Oltmanns

= Cladophorales =

Cladophorales Temporal range: 1000–0 Ma

Order of algae

Cladophorales are an order of green algae, in the class Ulvophyceae. Most members of this order are found in marine habitats; transitions to freshwater have occurred four times, in Pithophoraceae, Cladophora, Rhizoclonium, and Pseudorhizoclonium respectively. Only two genera, Spongiochrysis and Pseudorhizoclonium, are terrestrial.

The earliest known representative is Proterocladus antiquus from the Mesoproterozoic-Neoproterozoic boundary in North China.

The order Cladophorales consists of filamentous macroalgae attached to a surface. The filaments are uniseriate (one cell thick) with multinucleate cells, and range from unbranched to profusely branched. In some taxa, the filaments are modified into giant single cells, three-dimensional networks of branches, or pseudoparenchymatic clusters. Reproduction occurs vegetatively, asexually, and sexually. Vegetative reproduction occurs by fragmentation of filaments. Asexual reproduction occurs via zoospores, which are biflagellate or quadriflagellate. Sexual reproduction is isomorphic and diplohaplontic, involving alternating sporophyte and gametophyte generations which are morphologically identical. Gametes are biflagellate, and meiospores are quadriflagellate.

Currently, Cladophorales has an expanded circumscription that includes Siphonocladales. Classification has been difficult, because the simple morphology has led to convergent evolution. The current hypothesis of phylogenetic relationships are shown below:

- - Blastophysa (outgroup)
  - - - - Cladophoraceae
        - Siphonocladus clade (incl. Anadyomenaceae, Boodleaceae, Siphonocladaceae, Valoniaceae)
      - - Pithophoraceae
        - Pseudocladophoraceae
    - Okellyaceae
