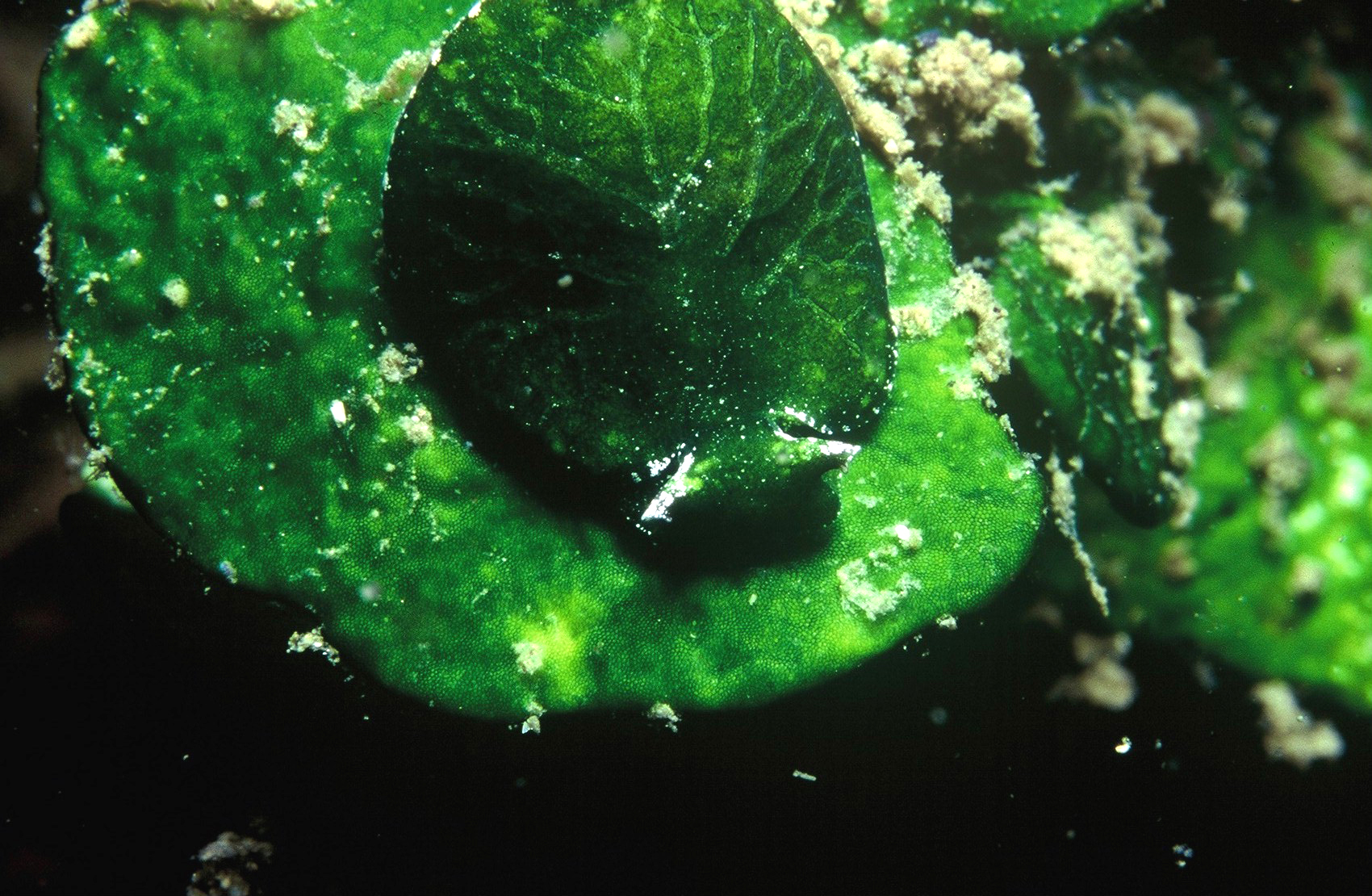

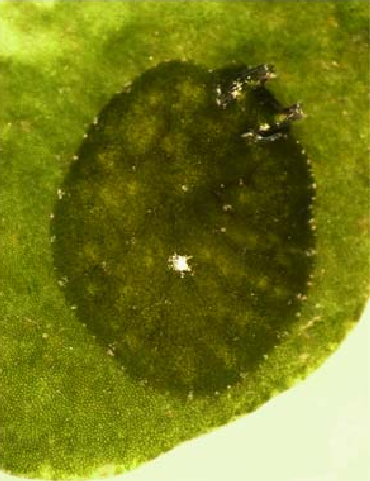
- Bosellia mimetica on Halimeda tuna. Locality: Mediterranean Sea. The length of the slug is about 1 cm.

Scientific classification
- Domain: Eukaryota
- Kingdom: Animalia
- Phylum: Mollusca
- Class: Gastropoda
- Family: Plakobranchidae
- Genus: Bosellia
- Species: B. mimetica

Binomial name
- Bosellia mimetica Trinchese, 1890

= Bosellia mimetica =

Species of sea slug

Bosellia mimetica is a species of sea slug, a marine gastropod mollusk in the family Plakobranchidae. It is a very small sea slug growing to less than 1 centimetre (0.4 in) in length. It has a rounded, flattened body and is a mottled green, a colour that mimics that of the algae Halimeda tuna and Flabellia petiolata on which it lives and feeds. Its range includes the Mediterranean Sea, the Iberian peninsula, the Caribbean Sea and the Atlantic coast of South America. The type locality is the island of Capri, in Italy.

== Description ==
Bosellia mimetica is a small, flattened sea slug that seldom exceeds 8 millimetres (0.3 in) in length. When at rest, its body is an oval shape but when moving it extends its body, resembling a grain of rice. There are transverse folds which separate the head, body and foot. The body has a flap on either side but there are no true parapodia. The two rhinophores are longitudinally-folded, smooth and are slightly paler in colour than the body colour. The general colour is a shade of green which resembles the colour of the alga on which it feeds. Individuals feeding on the underside of the fronds tend to be paler than those on the upper surface. There are often linear white markings that resemble the white worm tubes often present on the fronds. It can be distinguished from the rather similar but slightly larger Bosellia cohellia by the shorter rhinophores which lack white bands.

== Distribution ==
Bosellia mimetica is found in shallow water in the Mediterranean Sea, on the Atlantic coast of Spain, in the Caribbean Sea and south to Brazil. It has been found at depths ranging from 2 to 100 metres (7 to 328 ft).

== Ecology ==
This sea slug is exclusively vegetarian and seems to feed only on Halimeda and Flabellia petiolata. It feeds suctorially and between bouts of feeding remains on the surface of the host, where its colour and pattern provide camouflage. The white pigmenting resembles the worm tubes, bryozoans and other epibionts which occasionally occur on the host alga, and its specific name "mimetica" derives from this mimicry. The tissues contain secondary metabolites derived from the host which provide chemical protection against predation. However, some individuals have been observed with crescent-shaped sections missing, similar in shape to damage to the substrate alga; these are likely involuntary predation caused by the alga being grazed by fish such as the parrotfish Sparisoma cretense. In the Mediterranean Sea, the sea slug's yellowish or greyish egg spirals have been found on the host algae during summer and autumn.

The chloroplasts that are ingested when the algae is consumed are stored in the walls of branches of the digestive gland. There they remain active for up to 45 days and give the slug its colour. The carbohydrates produced by the chloroplasts during photosynthesis contribute to the slug's nutritional needs.
