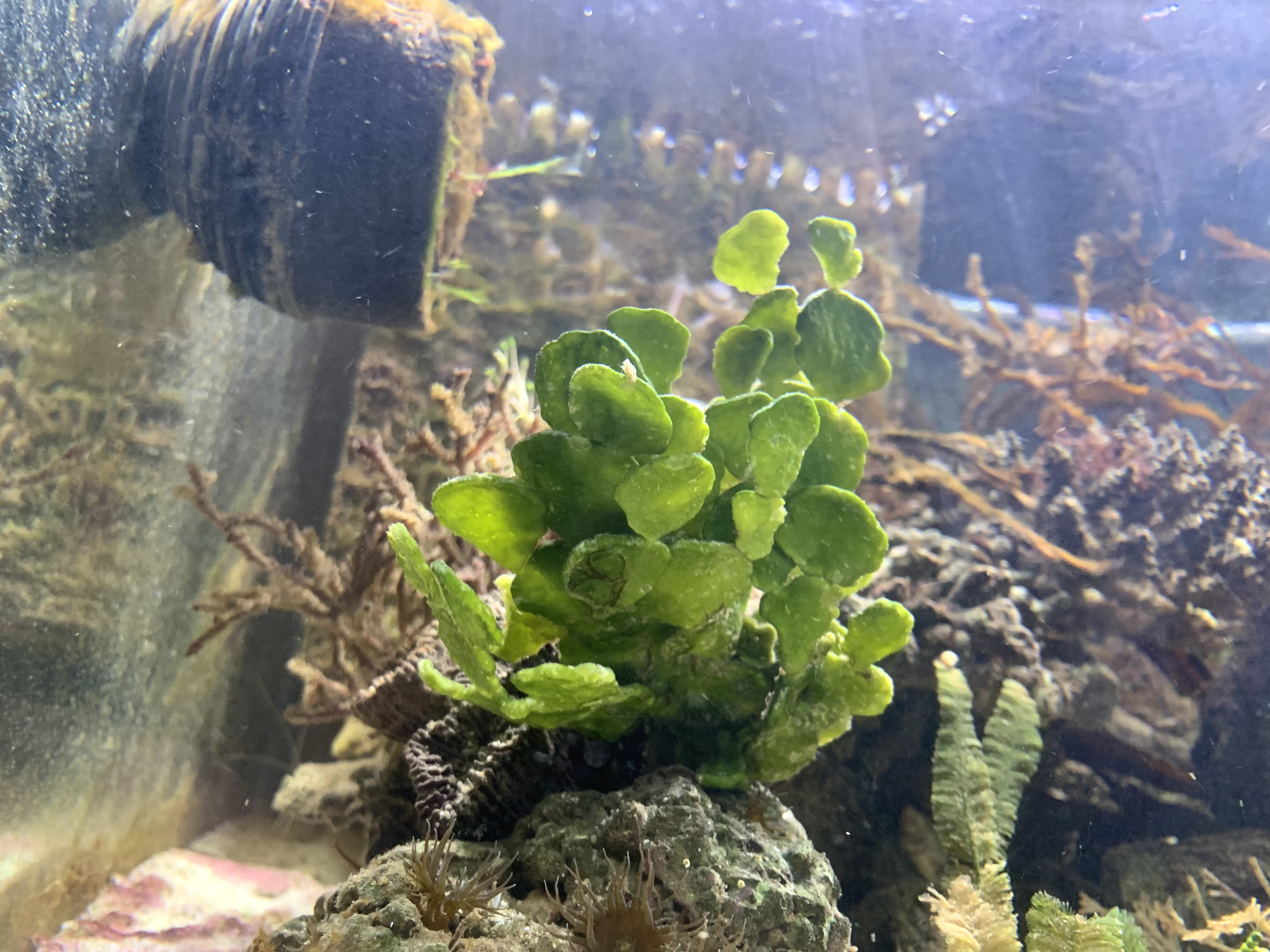

Scientific classification
- Domain: Eukaryota
- Clade: Archaeplastida
- Clade: Viridiplantae
- Division: Chlorophyta
- Class: Ulvophyceae
- Order: Bryopsidales
- Family: Halimedaceae
- Genus: Halimeda
- Species: H. discoidea

Binomial name
- Halimeda discoidea Decaisne

= Halimeda discoidea =

Species of alga (seaweed)

Halimeda discoidea is a species of calcareous green algae in the order Bryopsidales. It is commonly known as Money Plant due to its appearance and is usually found in the tropics.

== Description ==
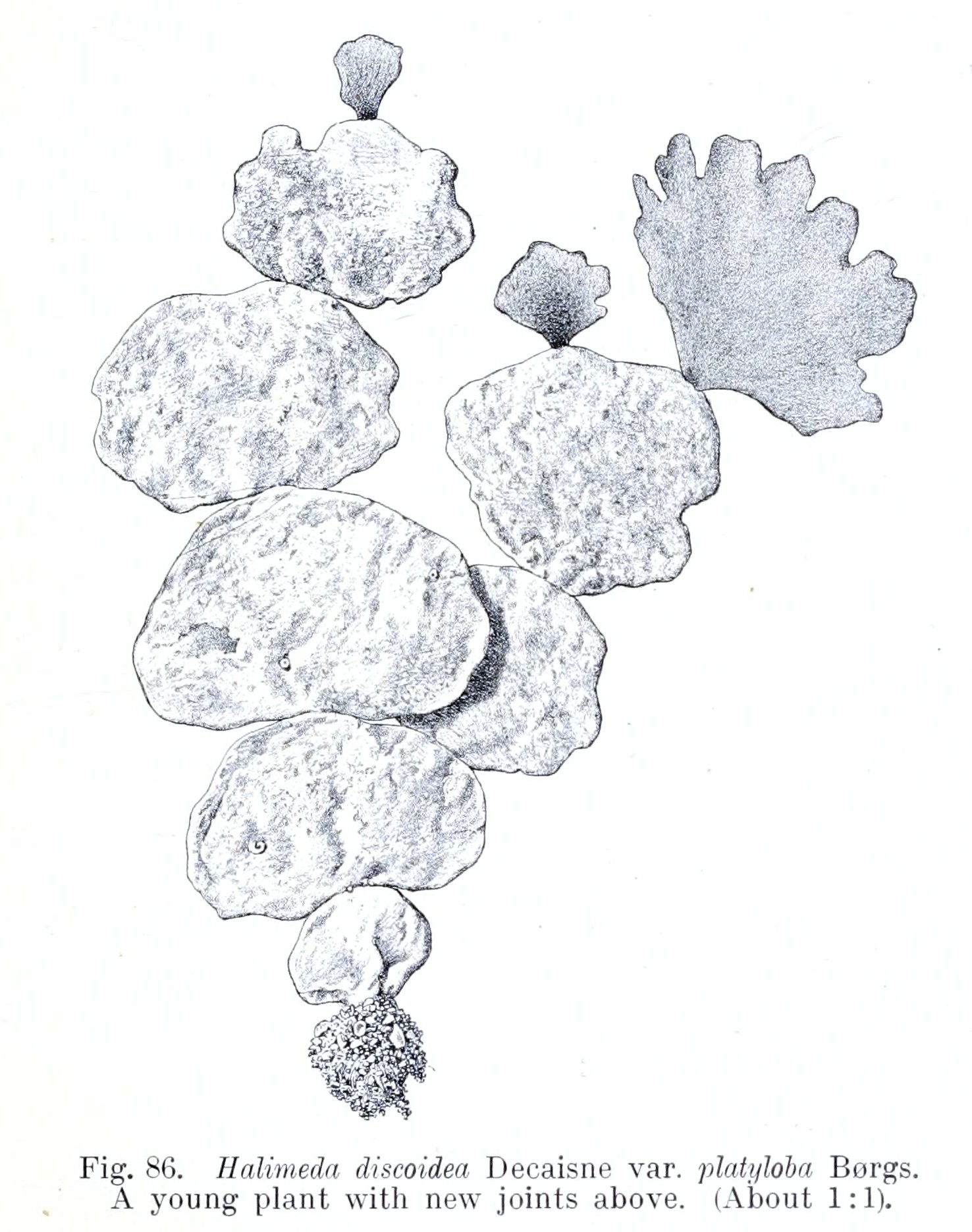
H. discoidea

Halimeda discoidea is a green colored segmented and calcified alga. This alga has a short holdfast and contains flat segments. It can get up to10 cm tall.

== Habitat ==
This species can be found attached to hard bottoms like reef and rocky surfaces anywhere in between 3–100 ft (0.9–30.5 m). This alga grows better with high light intensity but it is still capable of growing with low light levels.

== Distribution ==
Halimeda discoidea is found widely across the tropical ocean of the world, including the Hawaiian Islands.
