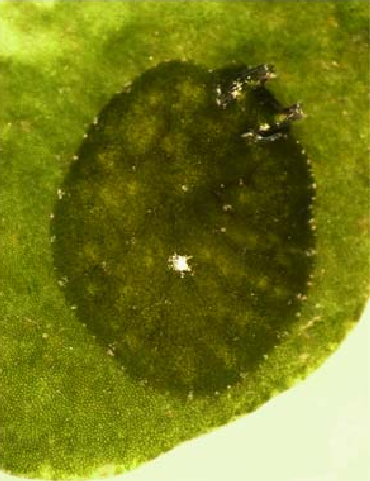
- Bosellia mimetica on Halimeda tuna. Locality: Mediterranean Sea. The length of the slug is about 1 cm.

Scientific classification
- Domain: Eukaryota
- Kingdom: Animalia
- Phylum: Mollusca
- Class: Gastropoda
- Family: Plakobranchidae
- Genus: Bosellia; Trinchese, 1891

= Bosellia =

Genus of gastropods

Bosellia is a genus of sea slugs in the family Plakobranchidae.

== Distribution ==
Distribution include warm waters in Mediterranean and in Atlantic Ocean. Reports from Indo-Pacific were not confirmed.

== Species ==
There are five recognized species in the genus Bosellia:

- Bosellia cohellia Marcus, 1978
- Bosellia corinneae Marcus, 1973
- Bosellia curasoae Er. Marcus & Ev. Marcus, 1970
- Bosellia levis Fernandez-Ovies & Ortea, 1986
- Bosellia mimetica Trinchese, 1890

Bosellia cohellia has an uncertain taxonomic status according to Jensen (2007).

Phylogenetic results by Händeler et al. (2009) indicate that the Caribbean "Bosellia marcusi" described by Eveline Agnes du Bois-Reymond Marcus (1972) is a derived species of Elysia. Morphological examination indicates that the parapodia of "B. marcusi" have secondarily fused over the dorsum, producing a superficial similarity with Bosellia. Bosellia marcusi Marcus, 1972 is a synonym for Elysia marcusi (Marcus, 1972).
