= Halimeda kanaloana =

Scientific classification
- Kingdom: Plantae
- Division: Chlorophyta
- Class: Ulvophyceae
- Order: Bryopsidales
- Family: Halimedaceae
- Genus: Halimeda
- Species: H. kanaloana

Binomial name
- Halimeda kanaloana Vroom, 2006

Species of alga

Halimeda kanaloana is a species of green algae (class Ulvophyceae) in the family Halimedaceae. This species is endemic to the Maui Nui island complex (Molokai, Maui, Lanai, Oahu, and Kahoolawe).

== Description ==
Halimeda kanaloana is characterized by a large, bulbous holdfast that anchors the specimen in sand. The basal thallus region consists of massive cylindrical to slightly flattened segments. In the central and distal regions of the thallus, the segments are large, obovoid to cuneate, and trilobed, with a median length of 9–14 mm, a width of 6–11 mm, and a thickness of 1.5-2.9 mm. The medullar siphons fuse into a single unit at the segment nodes, and pores are visible connecting neighboring siphons. The median pore height, including cell walls, is 47-69 μm. The plant has 4-5 layers of utricles, with large peripheral utricles measuring 56-73 μm in diameter and 69-98 μm in height. These utricles reach 42% of their maximal width at a quarter of their height and have angular corners in surface view. The subperipheral utricles are markedly inflated.

== Distribution ==
The overall geographic range of Halimeda kanaloana is narrow, spanning a few islands across Hawaii. It is endemic to the Maui Nui island complex or the islands of Molokai, Maui, Lanai, Oahu, and Kahoolawe.

== Habitat ==
Halimeda kanaloana can be found in meadows in sandy environments. Occasional individuals are found as shallow as 1–2 m, with dense stands beginning at 15 m and ending abruptly around 85 m. Specimens are anchored in sand by means of a gritty, bulbous anchoring holdfast, up to 8 cm in length, which the rhizoids cling tightly to sand. Very rarely, specimens are found attached to rock.
