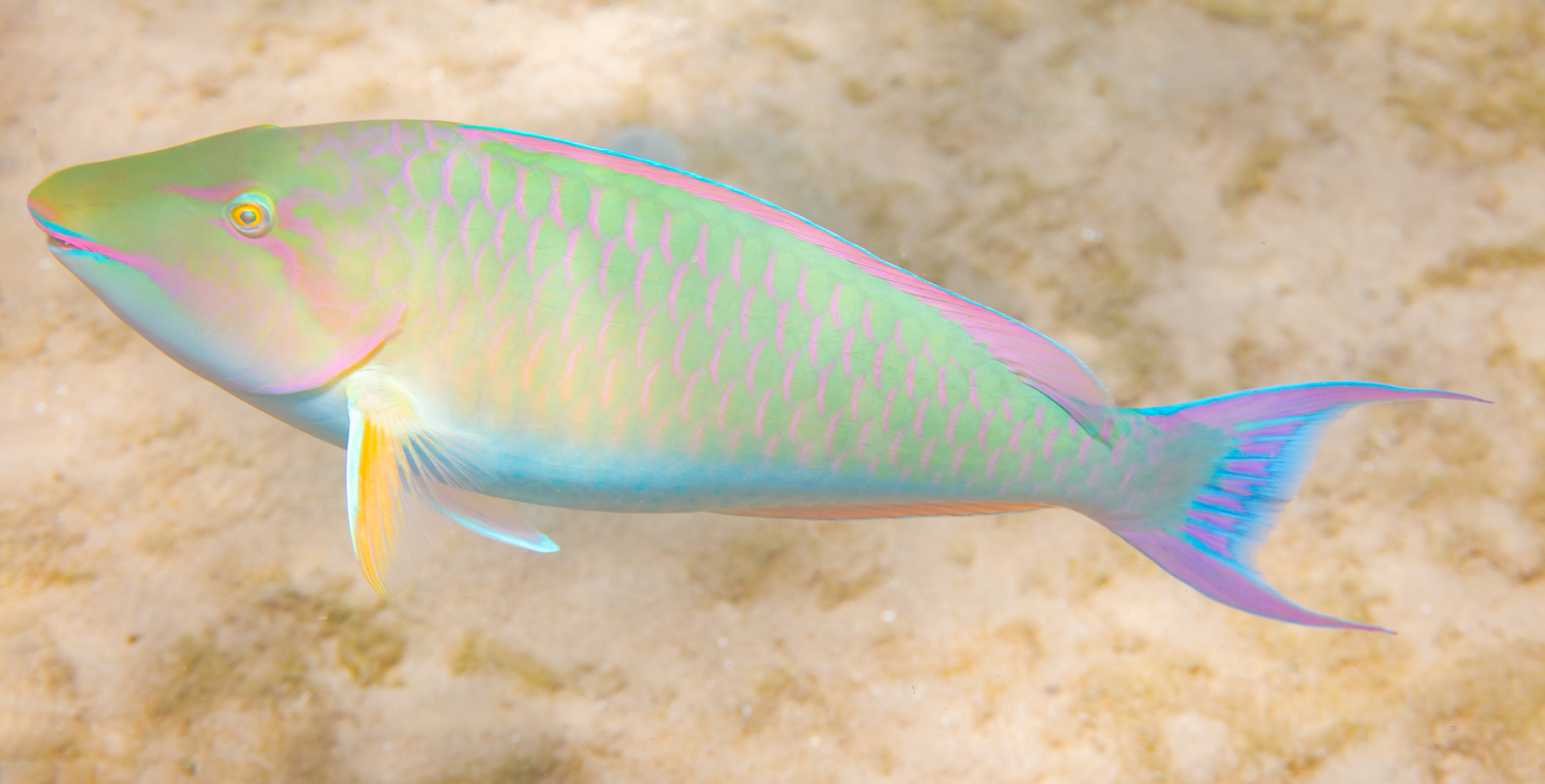
- Hipposcarus harid
- Hipposcarus longiceps

Scientific classification
- Kingdom: Animalia
- Phylum: Chordata
- Class: Actinopterygii
- Division: Teleostei
- Order: Labriformes
- Family: Labridae
- Tribe: Scarini
- Genus: Hipposcarus; Smith, 1956

Type species
- Scarus harid Forsskål, 1775

Species
- See text

= Hipposcarus =

Genus of ray-finned fishes

Hipposcarus is a genus of marine ray-finned fishes, parrotfish from the family Labridae. The two species in the genus are distributed in the Indo-Pacific.

== Species ==
Species	Common name	Terminal phase	Initial phase
Hipposcarus harid (Forsskål, 1775)	Indian longnose parrotfish		
Hipposcarus longiceps (Valenciennes, 1840)	Pacific longnose parrotfish		
