= Eugonophyllum =

Eugonophyllum Temporal range: Pennsylvanian-Permian

Scientific classification
- Clade: Viridiplantae
- Division: Chlorophyta
- Class: Ulvophyceae
- Order: Bryopsidales
- Family: Halimedaceae
- Genus: †Eugonophyllum; Konishi and Wray 1961

Species
- E. huecoense E. johnsonii (type); E. magnum

Genus of algae

Eugonophyllum is a genus of green algae in the family Halimedaceae. Specimens have been found in Carboniferous to Permian beds in North America, Europe, and east Asia.

The alga is phylloid, meaning it has leaflike photosynthesizing structures called thalli (singular: thallus). A thallus has the form of a broad, undulating blade, with circular to oval perforations scattered randomly across the blade. The blade consists of a fibrous medulla enclosed in a two-layered cortex. The thicker inner cortex consists of anastomosing utricles; that is, small sacklike structures joined by openings to their neighbors. The thin outer cortex consists of branchlets extending outwards from the inner cortex. Reproductive organs take the form of spherical protuberances within the inner cortex that are scattered irregularly over the surface of the thallus.

The alga is calcareous and its remains are important components of carbonate rock beds of Pennsylvanian to early Permian. It is particularly prominent as a carbonate producer (together with Paraepimastopora kansasensis) in rocks of Kasimovian to Gzhelian age, in regions of warm water notably close to glaciated continental areas. It grew below wave base, probably in protected shallow water, and grew to at least a few inches in height
