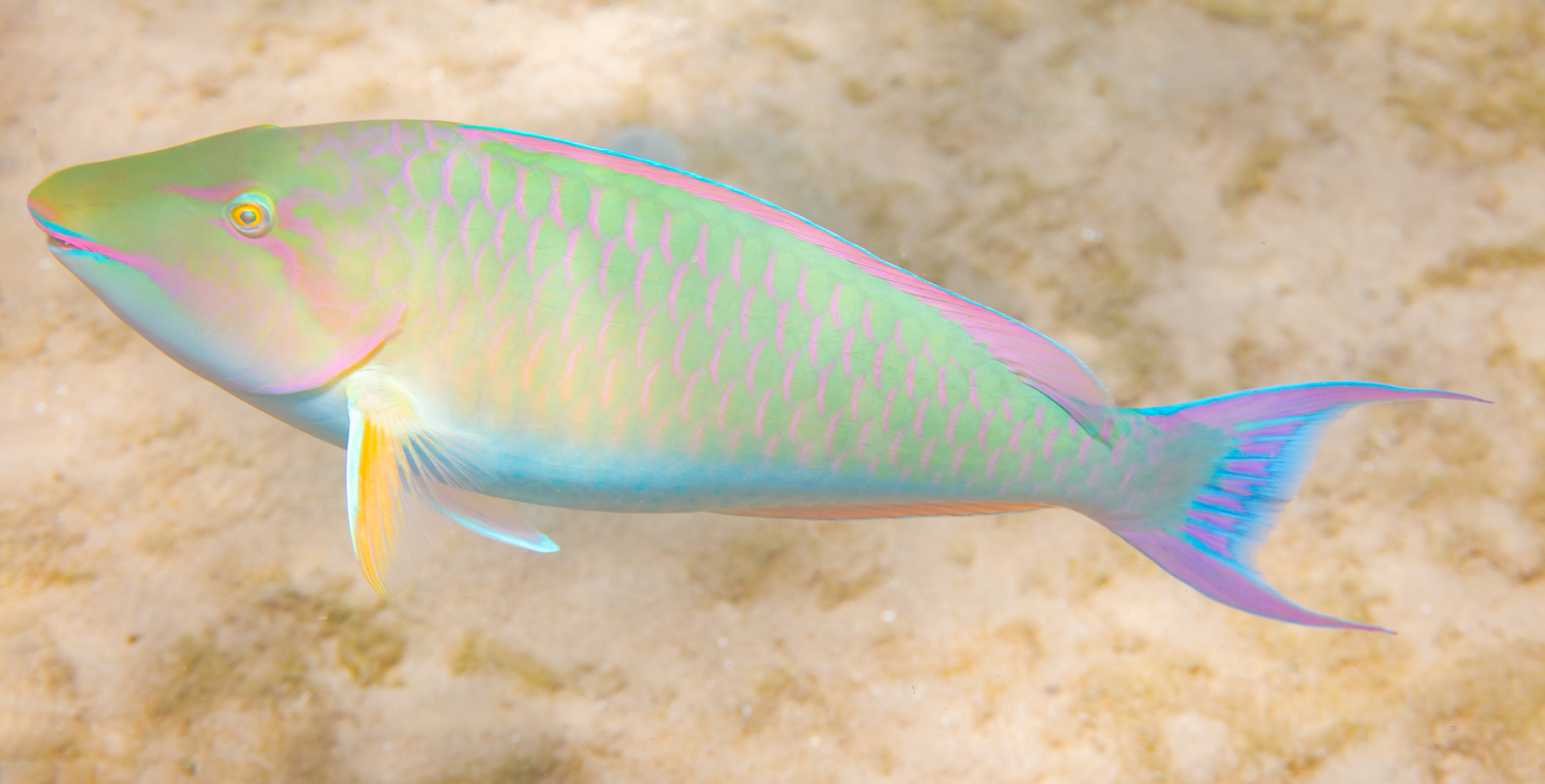

- Terminal phase (top); Initial phase (bottom)

Conservation status
- Least Concern (IUCN 3.1)

Scientific classification
- Kingdom: Animalia
- Phylum: Chordata
- Class: Actinopterygii
- Division: Teleostei
- Order: Labriformes
- Family: Labridae
- Genus: Hipposcarus
- Species: H. harid

Binomial name
- Hipposcarus harid (Forsskål, 1775)

Synonyms
- Scarus harid Forsskål, 1775; Callyodon harid (Forsskål, 1775); Scarus cyanurus Valenciennes, 1840

= Hipposcarus harid =

Species of fish

Hipposcarus harid, the Longnose parrotfish or Candelamoa parrotfish, is a species of marine ray-finned fish, a parrotfish from the family Scaridae found on coral reefs of Indian Ocean and the Red Sea.

== Distribution ==
Hipposcarus harid is found in the western Indian Ocean from the Red Sea south to the Mozambique Channel, including Madagascar, the Seychelles and east to Sri Lanka, the Maldives and the Chagos Islands.

== Habitat and biology ==
Hipposcarus harid occurs in coastal regions and is associated with coral reefs and reef flats. This species forms harems comprising a terminal phase, or male, individual and numerous initial phase individuals. It will also form large schools for foraging. H. harid is a protogynous hermaphrodite in which there are two distinct phases, an initial phase which includes females and primary, that is males which were born male, and a terminal phase, the secondary males transformed from females. It is an oviparous species in which the male and female form pairs for mating. It feeds on benthic algae.

== Human usage ==
Hipposcarus harid is caught with nets and other artisanal gear, the catch is maistly marketed fresh. Each year in April these fish aggregate in a shallow lagoon in the Farasan Islands in the southern Red Sea. The reason for this aggregation is unknown but the local people celebrate a festival, called Hareed, catching the fish for prizes. Almost all the fish are caught but the aggregation returns each year. Evidence for the consumption and trade of this species, among other parrotfishes native to the Red Sea, goes back to at least the Byzantine period.

== Gallery ==
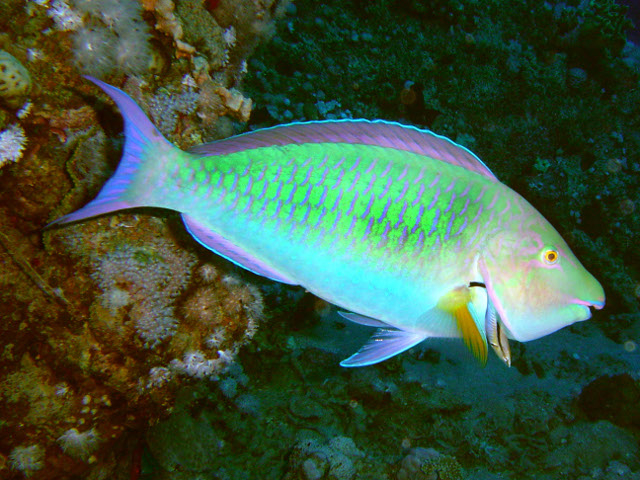

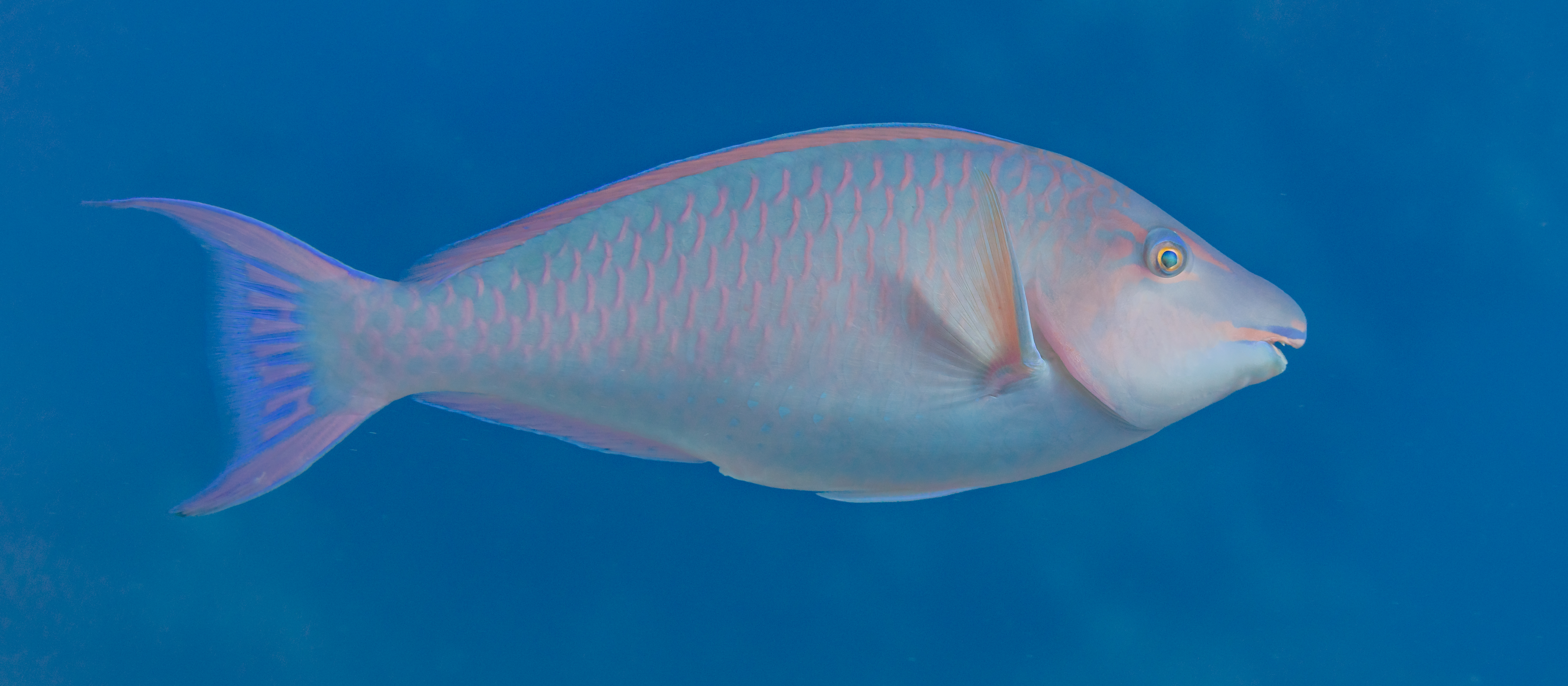

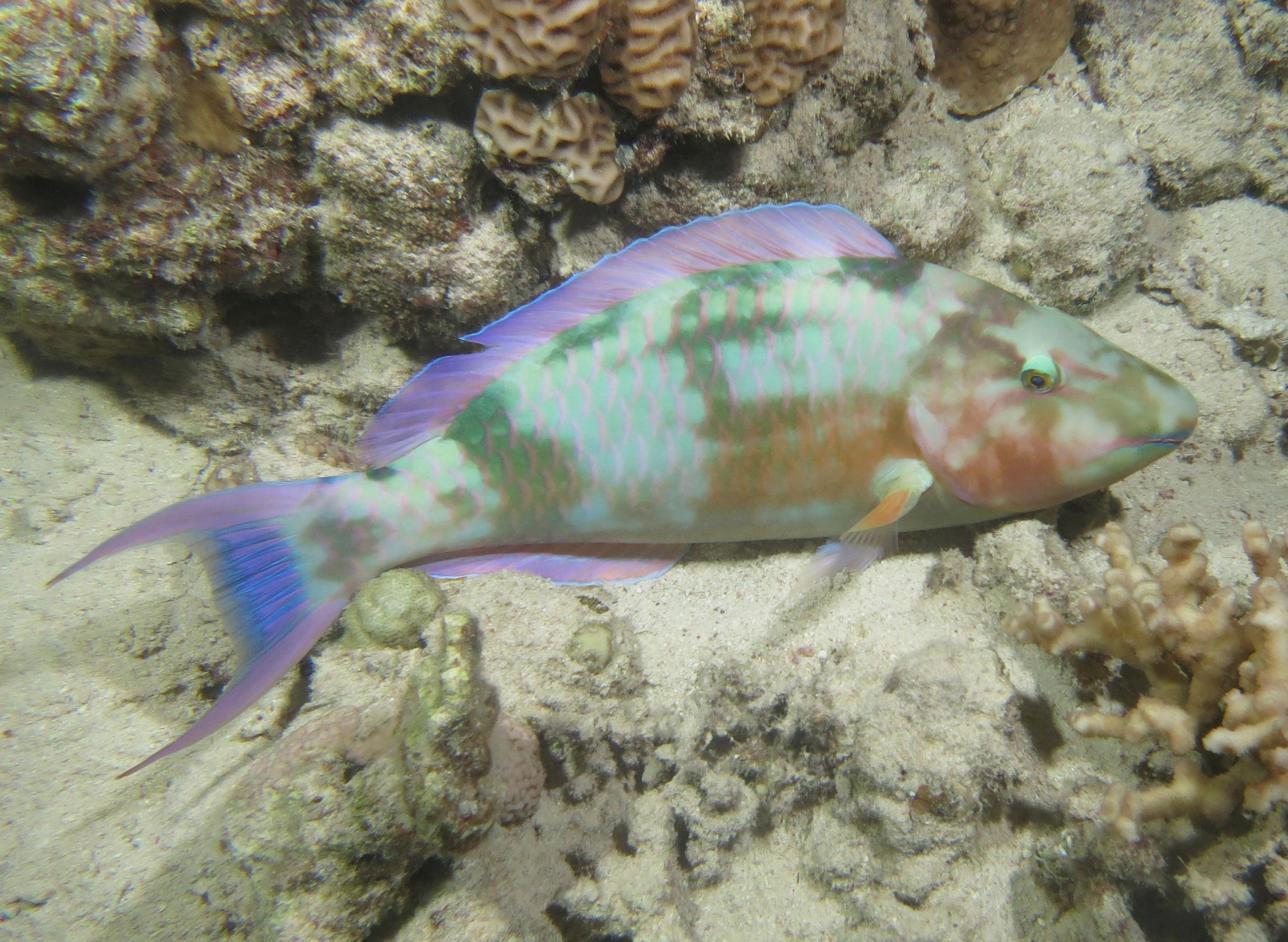

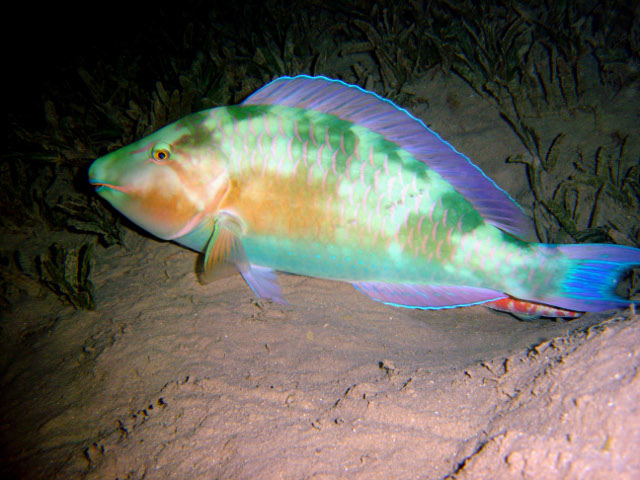

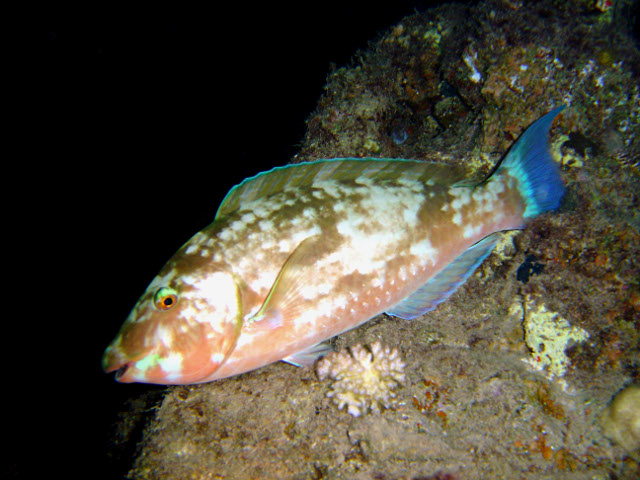

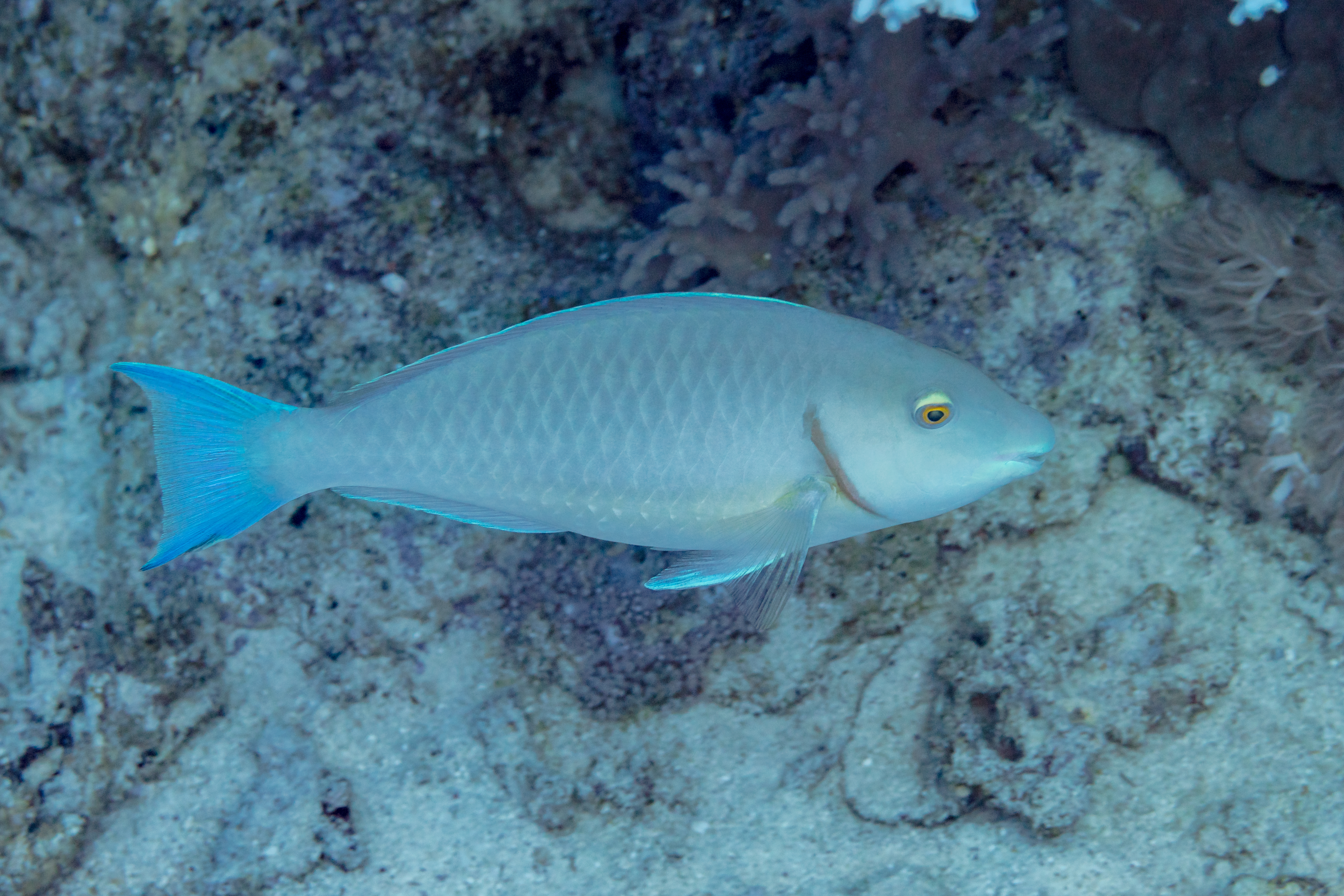
