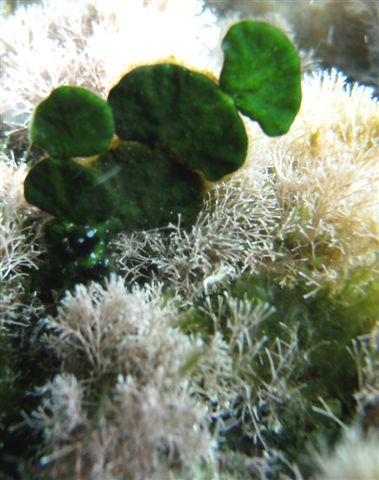
- Halimeda tuna

Scientific classification
- Domain: Eukaryota
- Supergroup: Archaeplastida
- Clade: Viridiplantae
- Division: Chlorophyta
- Class: Ulvophyceae
- Order: Bryopsidales
- Family: Halimedaceae
- Genus: Halimeda; J.V.Lamouroux, 1812

Type species
- Halimeda tuna (J. Ellis & Solander) J.V. Lamouroux, 1816

Species
- See text

= Halimeda =

Halimeda Temporal range: Permian - recent

Genus of algae

Halimeda is a genus of green macroalgae. The algal body (thallus) is composed of calcified green segments. Calcium carbonate is deposited in its tissues, making it inedible to most herbivores. However one species, Halimeda tuna, was described as pleasant to eat with oil, vinegar, and salt.

As in other members of the order Bryopsidales, individual organisms are made up of single multi-nucleate cells. Whole meadows may consist of a single individual alga connected by fine threads running through the substrate.

Halimeda is responsible for distinctive circular deposits in various parts of the Great Barrier Reef on the north-east coast of Queensland, Australia. Halimeda beds form in the western or lee side of outer shield reefs where flow of nutrient-rich water from the open sea allows them to flourish, and are the most extensive, actively accumulating Halimeda beds in the world.

The genus is one of the best studied examples of cryptic species pairs due to morphological convergence within the marine macroalgae.

Some species grow so vigorously in tropical lagoons that the sediment is composed solely of the remains of their tissues, forming a calcareous "Halimeda sand". In fact some tropical reef systems, such as atolls, consist largely of Halimeda sand accumulated over the aeons. Overall, Halimeda represents the most common green algae large grains in the sediment of the lower latitudes.

== Taxonomy and nomenclature ==
The genus Halimeda J.V. Lamouroux belongs to the order Bryopsidales under the family Halimedaceae. It has five monophyletic sections—Halimeda J.V. Lamouroux, Micronesicae Hillis-Col, Opuntia J. Agardh ex De Toni, Pseudo-opuntia J. Agardh ex De Toni, and Rhipsalis J. Agardh ex De Toni—which were based on the differences in the fusions of medullary siphons. Halimeda tuna serves as the holotype for the genus. There are 71 species and 67 infraspecific names listed on Algaebase as of 2015.

== Morphology ==
The thalli of Halimeda are distinctly segmented and calcified. Calcium carbonate is deposited as aragonite and calcification begins as early as 36 hours. Their segments are composed of 60–80% aragonite and are separated by nodes which are non-calcified. The thalli are composed of siphons which are ramified into medullary filaments surrounded by a cortex. The medullary filaments branch out trichotomously to form peripheral utricles which stick to each other to enclose the intersiphonal spaces of each segment. It is in these spaces that aragonite is precipitated.

Halimeda has three types of holdfasts which serve as attachment points to the substrate. The "sprawler" type has a few loose filaments growing at the ends or in between the segments (Fig. 1). In the "rock-grower" type, the matted holdfast is composed of branched filaments which secure the thallus to a rock surface. The last type is the "sand-grower", where the filaments hold on to fine sand particles, forming a root-like structure. Halimeda is coenocytic and siphonous, meaning its cells are not divided by cross walls, and is instead a continuous filament of cells. This differentiates the genus from Acetabularia, which is another genus of green seaweed that is calcified.

== Distribution ==
Halimeda is highly abundant in the tropics including the Thai-Malay Peninsula and the Florida Keys. Some species (e.g. H. copiosa, discoidea, gracilis, opuntia, simulans, and tuna) have a global distribution. Halimeda tuna is found solely in the Mediterranean.

Figure 1. Erect and sprawling Halimeda plants

== Ecology ==
Species of Halimeda with sand-grower type holdfasts grow on sandy or muddy substrates, and are thus common in lagoons and backreefs. Those with the "sprawler" type are abundant in forereefs and on coral pinnacles.

Being a calcareous alga, Halimeda has been found to have good potential as a carbon sink and can play an important role in regulating the ocean's carbon budget. Some species such as H. opuntia have been found to produce up to 54.37 g CaCO_{3} m^{−1} yr^{−1}. The genus also contributes to reef building, as it is large producer of carbon sediments on reefs, generating a wide range of sediment sizes from coarse particles to silt and clay.

Although it was largely assumed that its abundance on reefs is due to it being unpalatable to herbivores, more recent studies have found that Halimeda is in fact subject to grazing by some herbivores such as Scarus rivulatus, Hipposcarus longiceps, and Chlorurus microrhinos. Hard coral cover can actually play a key role in maintaining Halimeda biomass on reefs, as one study found that thalli growing under the canopy of Acropora colonies were larger than those in open areas exposed to herbivory.

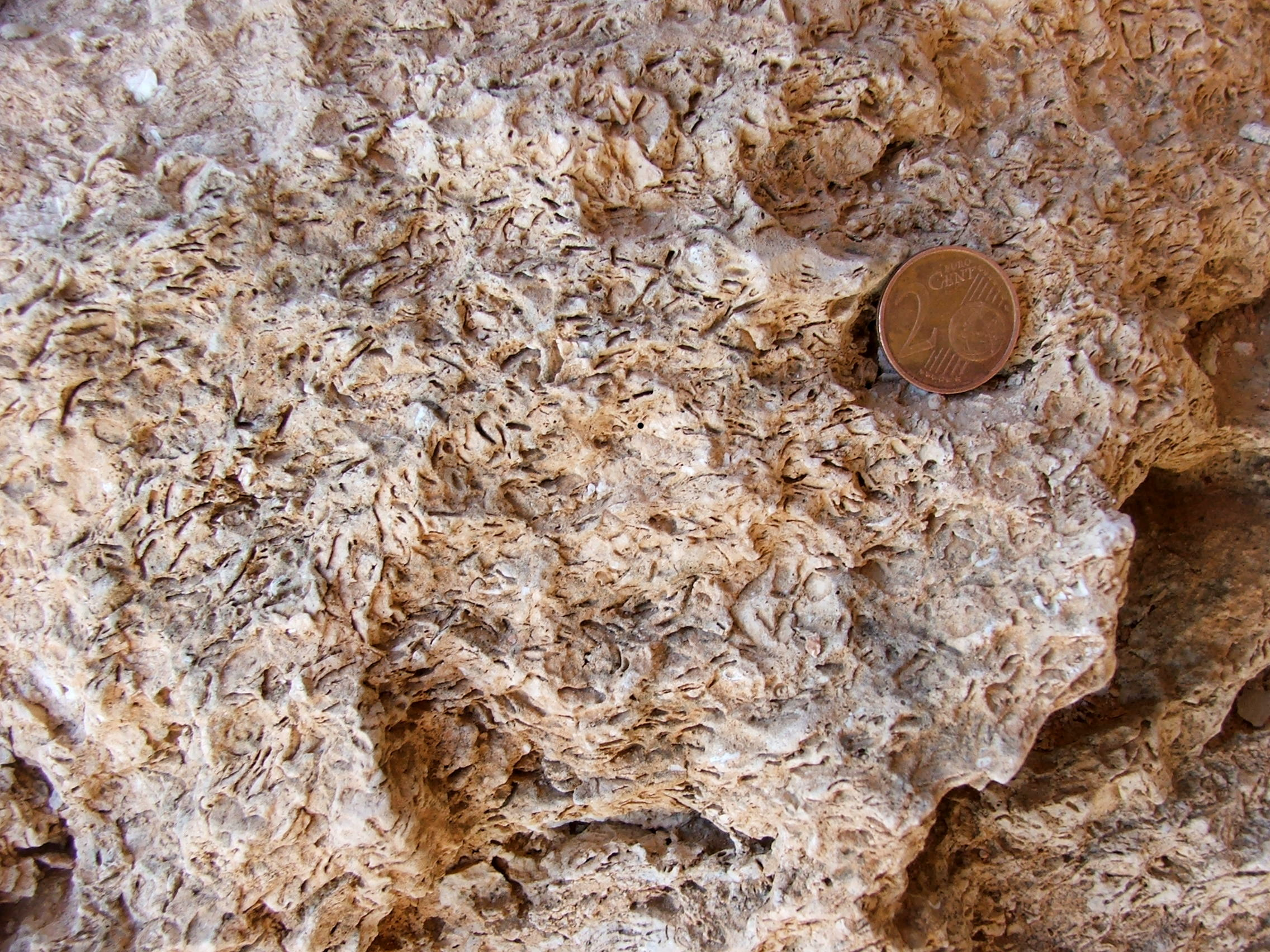
Figure 2. Fossilised Halimeda

== Life history ==
Halimeda reproduces both sexually and asexually. Sexual reproduction is rarely observed because it is completed in 36 hours. The process begins with gametangia forming on the edges of the segments of the thalli. By the next day, the cells of the thallus will have been entirely converted to gametangia. These will mature overnight and release gametes in the morning of the next day, after which the thallus is left white and dies in a process known as holocarpy. Some species of Halimeda have been found to reproduce synchronously in mass spawning events similar to that of corals, albeit occurring over several months, with small portions of the population spawning each day. Therefore it is likely that the life span of the genus is limited to a few months to a year.

Information on the phases of Halimeda's life cycle are limited. It is thought that there is a haploid gametophyte phase, which might be followed by a sporophyte phase, since it not yet known when meiosis occurs.

Asexual reproduction occurs via vegetative "cloning" through fragmentation and dispersal.

== Chemical composition ==
The genus' photosynthetic pigments are those typical of class Chlorophyta (chlorophyll a and b) and also include siphonoxanthin and siphonein.

== Exploitation and cultivation ==
Currently, Halimeda does not appear to be cultivated for aquaculture purposes.

== Utilization ==
Methanol and dimethyformamide extracts of Halimeda opuntia have been observed to have antibacterial properties against some species of microorganisms, including Saccharomyces cerevisiae, Escherichia coli, Bacillus subtilis, and most significantly, Staphylococcus aureus. Halimeda opuntia ethanol extract exhibited activity against hepatitis C virus (HCV) due to polymerase inhibitory (HCV-796) binding sites based on molecular docking simulation. Methanolic extracts of Halimeda macroloba have recently been found to exhibit cytotoxicity towards MCF-7 and HT-29 cells, which are derived from human breast cancer cell lines and colon cancer lines, respectively. These results therefore suggest the genus' potential for cultivation as a food source. An experiment on rats showed that free phenolic acids of Halimeda monile have antioxidant properties which could aid in protecting against liver problems. Halimeda tuna appears to be used as fodder in the Philippines.

== Species ==
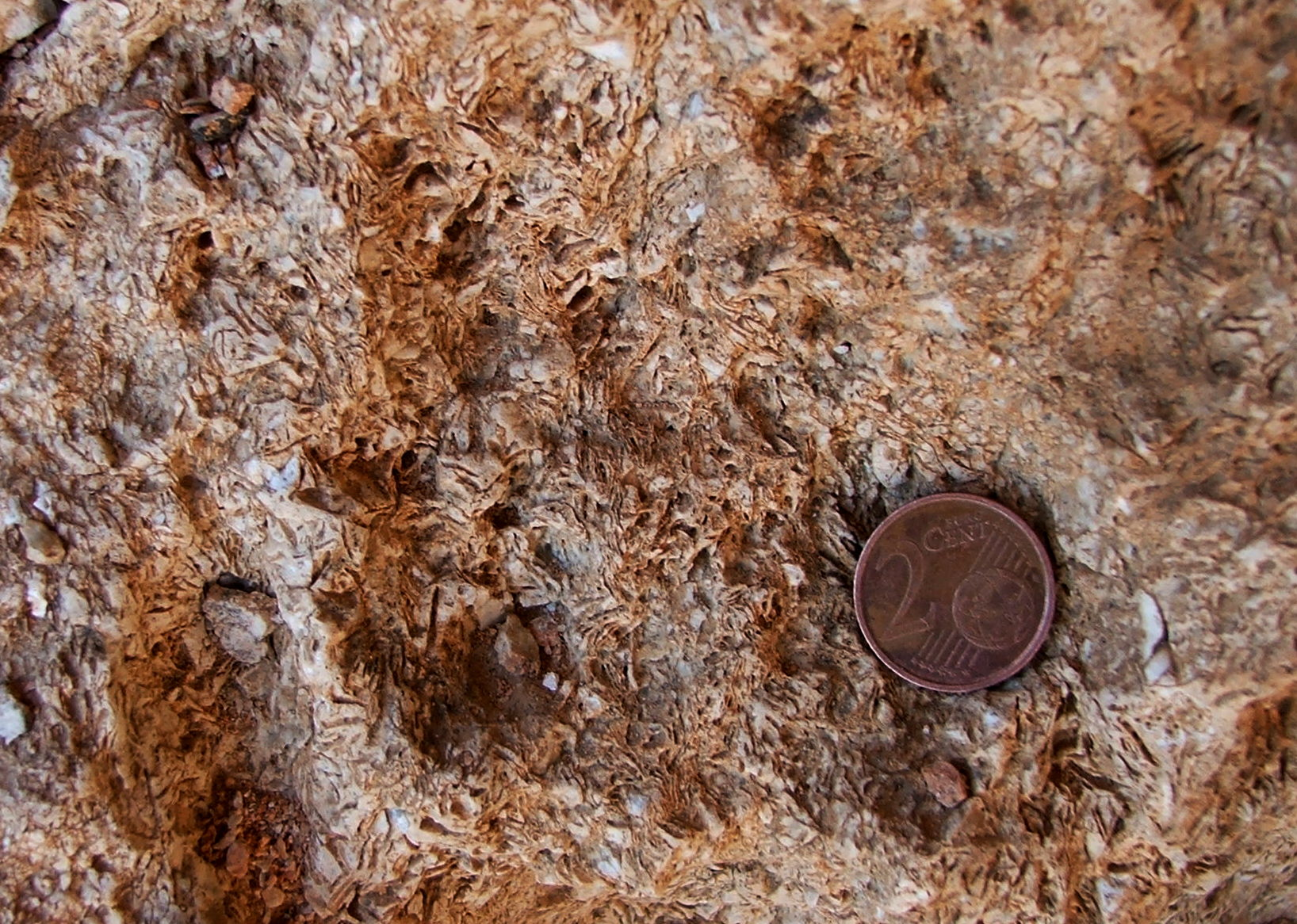
Figure 3. Halimeda fossils. The voids are where the Halimeda was, when it was covered with sand, then subsequently rotted, leaving a hole.

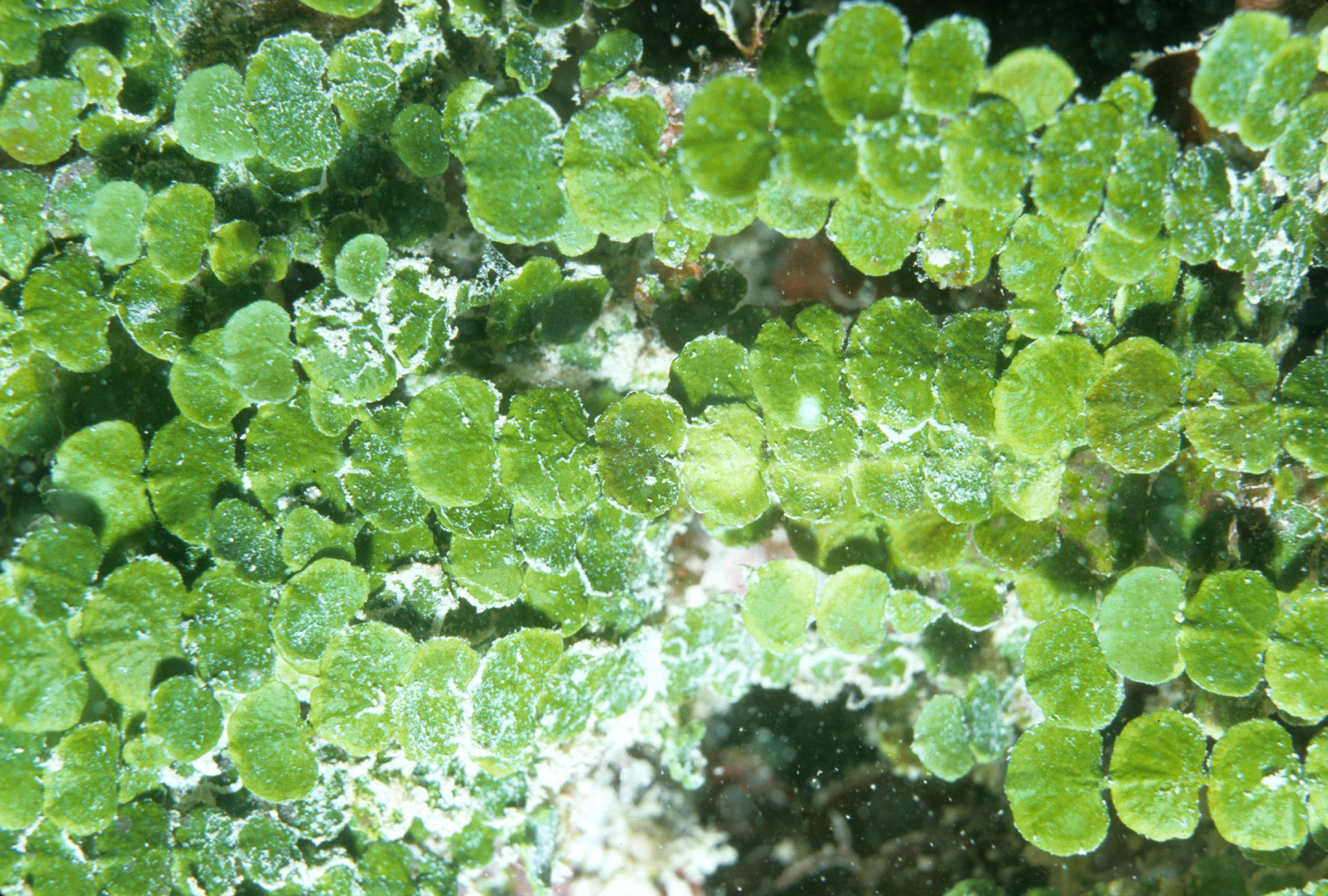
Figure 4. Halimeda copiosa at 10 meters (33 ft) depth in shallow cave

- H. bikinensis
- H. borneensis
- H. cereidesmis
- H. copiosa
- H. cryptica
- H. cuneata
- H. cylindracea
- H. discoidea
- H. distorta
- H. favulosa
- H. fragilis
- H. gigas
- H. goreauii
- H. gracilis
- H. heteromorpha
- H. howensis
- H. hummii
- H. incrassata
- H. kanaloana
- H. lacrimosa
- H. lacunalis
- H. macroloba
- H. macrophysa
- H. magnidisca
- H. melanesica
- H. micronesica
- H. minima
- H. monile
- H. opuntia
- H. pumila
- H. pygmaea
- H. renschii
- H. scabra
- H. simulans
- H. stuposa
- H. taenicola
- H. tuna
- H. velasquezii
