= Decaisne =

Decaisne is a surname. Notable people with the surname include:

- Henri Decaisne (1799–1852), Belgian historical and portrait painter
- Joseph Decaisne (1807–1882), French botanist and agronomist
