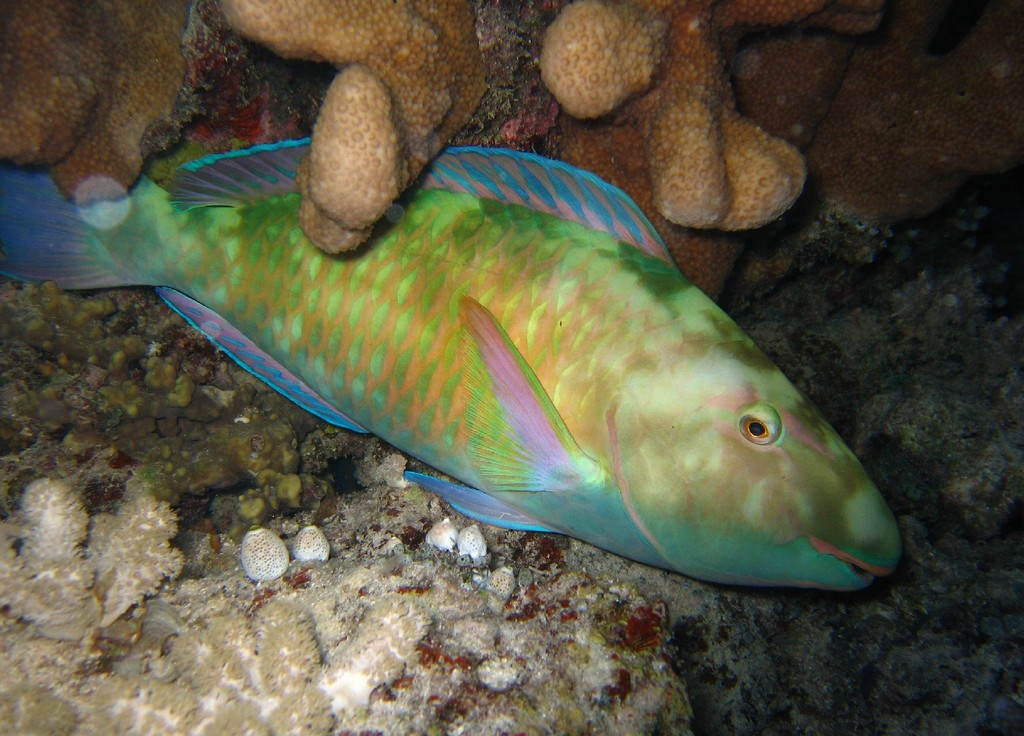

- Terminal phase (top); Initial phase (bottom)

Conservation status
- Least Concern (IUCN 3.1)

Scientific classification
- Kingdom: Animalia
- Phylum: Chordata
- Class: Actinopterygii
- Division: Teleostei
- Order: Labriformes
- Family: Labridae
- Genus: Hipposcarus
- Species: H. longiceps

Binomial name
- Hipposcarus longiceps (Valenciennes, 1840)

Synonyms
- Scarus longiceps Valenciennes, 1840

= Hipposcarus longiceps =

Species of fish

Hipposcarus longiceps or Pacific longnose parrotfish is a species of marine ray-finned fish, a parrotfish in the family Scaridae. It is found in the eastern Indian Oceans and the western Pacific Ocean from the Cocos-Keeling Islands and Rowley Shoals in the eastern Indian Ocean to the Line and Tuamotu islands in the east, north to the Ryukyu Islands, south to the Great Barrier Reef and New Caledonia.

Hipposcarus longiceps was first formally described as Scarus longiceps in 1840 by the French ichthyologist Achille Valenciennes (1794–1865) with the type locality given as Waigeo in modern Indonesia.

The Hipposcarus longiceps exhibits distinct ontogenetic changes in otolith morphology, with younger individuals having more rounded otoliths and older individuals displaying elongated, lobed structures. These morphological differences are useful for species identification and understanding growth stages within parrotfish taxonomy. (Jawad, L.A, 2018)

Additionally, the Hipposcarus longiceps exhibits diandric hermaphroditism, meaning some individuals mature as males from birth, while others transition from female to male later in life (Moore, 2022).

The species is on the IUCN Red List as Least Concern, from the assessment year 2012.
