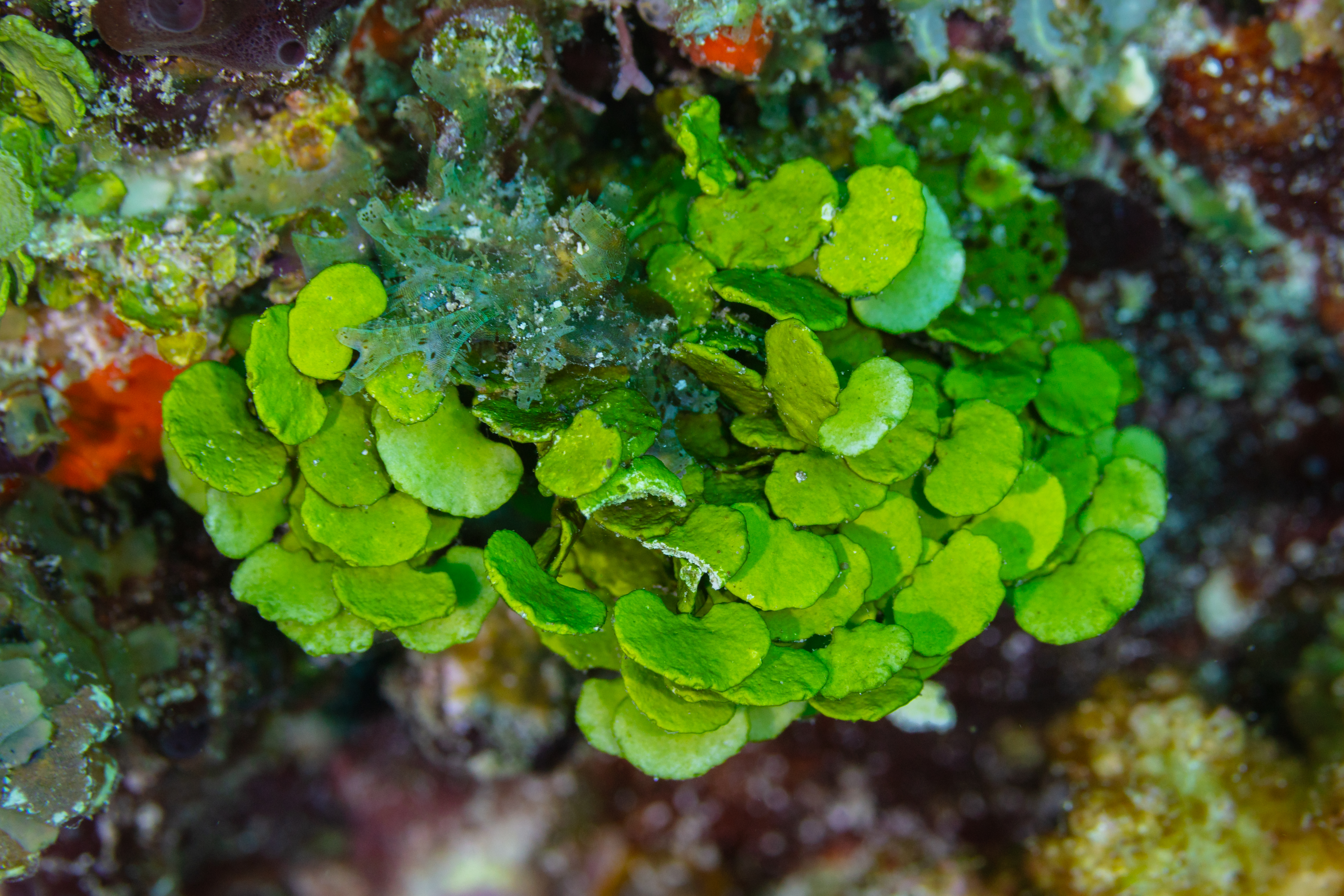
- Halimeda tuna on the Sicilian coast

Scientific classification
- Clade: Viridiplantae
- Division: Chlorophyta
- Class: Ulvophyceae
- Order: Bryopsidales
- Family: Halimedaceae
- Genus: Halimeda
- Species: H. tuna

Binomial name
- Halimeda tuna (J. Ellis & Solander) J. V. Lamouroux, 1816

Synonyms
- Corallina tuna J.Ellis & Solander, 1768; Halimeda platydisca Decaisne, 1842; Halimeda tuna f. albertisii (Piccone) De Toni, 1889; Halimeda tuna f. platydisca (Decaisne) E.S.Barton, 1901; Halimeda tuna var. albertisii Piccone, 1883; Halimeda tuna var. platydisca (Decaisne) Børgesen, 1911

= Halimeda tuna =

Species of alga (seaweed)

Halimeda tuna is a species of calcareous green seaweed in the order Bryopsidales. It is found on reefs in the Atlantic Ocean, the Indo-Pacific region and the Mediterranean Sea. Halimeda tuna is the type species of the genus Halimeda and the type locality is the Mediterranean Sea. The specific name "tuna" comes from the Taíno language, meaning "cactus" and referring to the resemblance of the thallus to the growth form of an Opuntia cactus.

== Description ==
Halimeda tuna is a calcareous green seaweed, attached to the seabed by a holdfast. Each individual thallus (frond) consists of a single cell forming a tube with multiple cell nuclei. The cytoplasm is mobile and the nuclei, chloroplasts and other cell contents are free to move around inside the cell wall. The tube has flattened, disc-like segments connected by flexible joints. The surface of these segments have swollen areas called utricles which together make a tabular "cellular pavement". Below and between these utricles, there are gaps and it is here that the fluid is saturated with calcium carbonate and crystalline needles of aragonite form. These stiffen the segments and make the seaweed unpalatable to fish. When the seaweed dies, this skeletal material breaks down into "sand". Members of this genus are likely to be one of the most important agents of calcification in the marine environment, considerably more productive in tropical seas than stony corals.

== Distribution ==
This species is found in the tropical and subtropical Indo-Pacific region, the Mediterranean Sea and the western Atlantic Ocean. It grows on rocky reefs from the shallow subtidal zone down to depths of about 70 m (230 ft). In the Mediterranean Sea it occurs in two separate habitat types; shallow, warm lagoons and sheltered places in the central Mediterranean and deep water (18 m (60 ft)) rocky habitats in the northwest Mediterranean. Similarly, in the Florida Keys, it is the dominant green alga in shallow back reef locations and in much deeper, less well lit, reef slope habitats.

== Ecology ==
The thallus of this seaweed is often overgrown by epiphytes which are at their maximum abundance in summer. The segments are sometimes damaged by storms, but are replaced by new growth which occurs with rising temperatures and increasing amounts of irradiation and dissolved nutrients. In the deepwater habitats in the Mediterranean, it is the dominant species and is often found in association with the encrusting red alga Mesophyllum lichenoides. In this habitat it tends to grow on vertical walls, under overhangs and in positions where it receives little sunlight. Its adaptation to dim light is assisted by its containing two accessory photosynthetic pigments, the green-absorbing carotenoids siphonein and siphonaxanthin, as well as chlorophyll a and chlorophyll b. In Florida, reproductive events occurred simultaneously across the reef, with up to 5% of thalli developing gametangia. Asexual reproduction also occurred through fragmentation or the growth of vegetative stolons.

== Human uses ==
This seaweed has been described as pleasant to eat with oil, vinegar, and salt.
