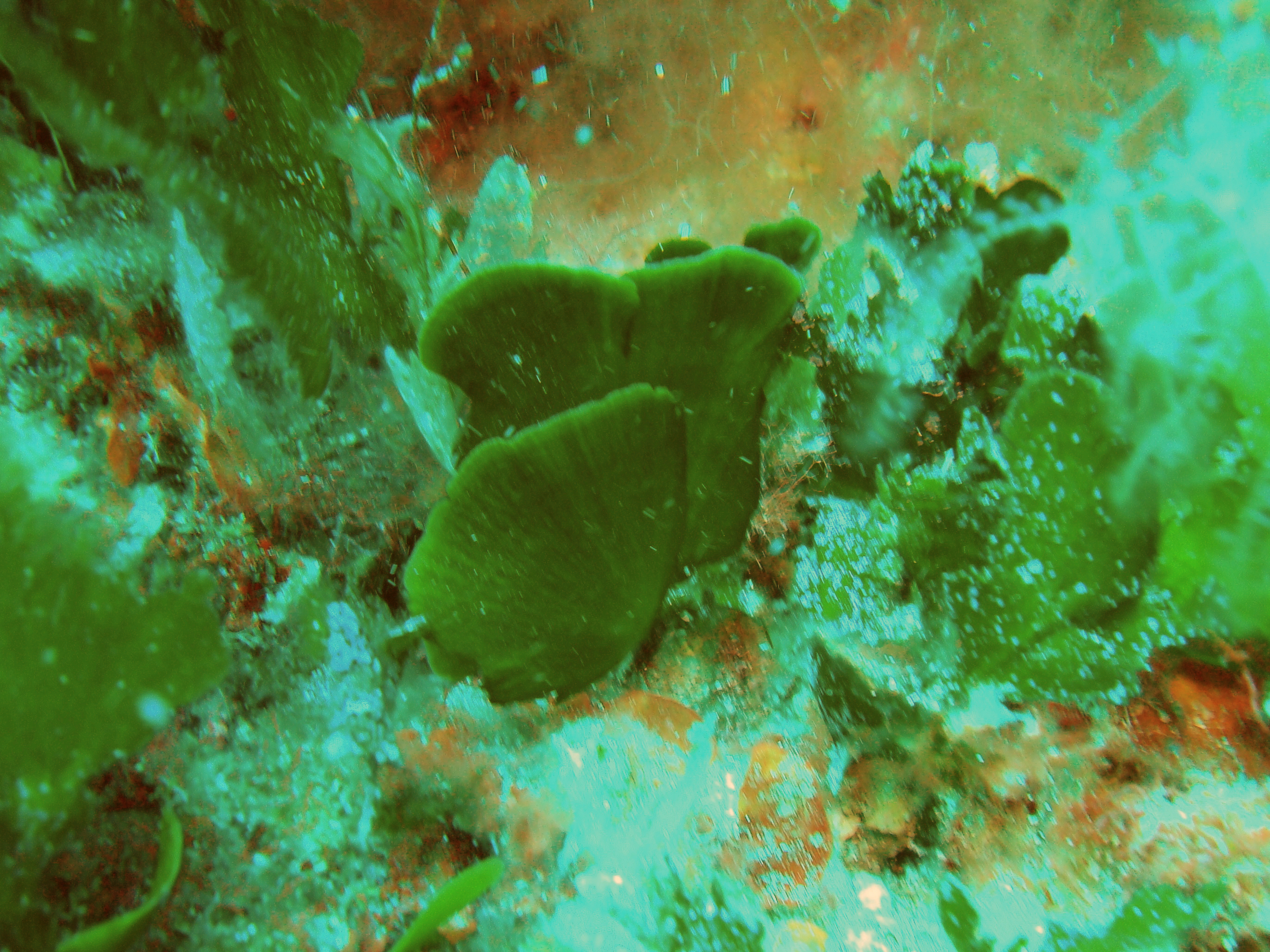
- Flabellia petiolata at Capo Gallo, Palermo, Italy

Scientific classification
- Domain: Eukaryota
- Clade: Archaeplastida
- Clade: Viridiplantae
- Division: Chlorophyta
- Class: Ulvophyceae
- Order: Bryopsidales
- Family: Halimedaceae
- Genus: Flabellia; Reichenbach, 1841
- Species: F. petiolata

Binomial name
- Flabellia petiolata (Turra) Nizamuddin

= Flabellia =

Genus of algae

Flabellia is a genus of green algae in the family Halimedaceae. Flabellaria is an accepted synonym of this genus. It is a monotypic genus and Flabellia petiolata is the only species; it is found in the eastern Atlantic Ocean and the Mediterranean Sea.

== Distribution and habitat ==
Flabellia petiolata is native to the Mediterranean Sea and also occurs in the Canary Islands and Cape Verde. It grows in shallow waters with soft sediment. In 2020 it was recorded for the first time in southern England, a location much further north than southern Spain, its previous northern limit. The English population has been confirmed by morphological and molecular data to be identical with the Mediterranean population. Researchers are questioning whether this is a relict species, previously overlooked, or a genuine expansion of the range of the alga.
