= Salvatore Trinchese =

Italian zoologist (1836–1897)

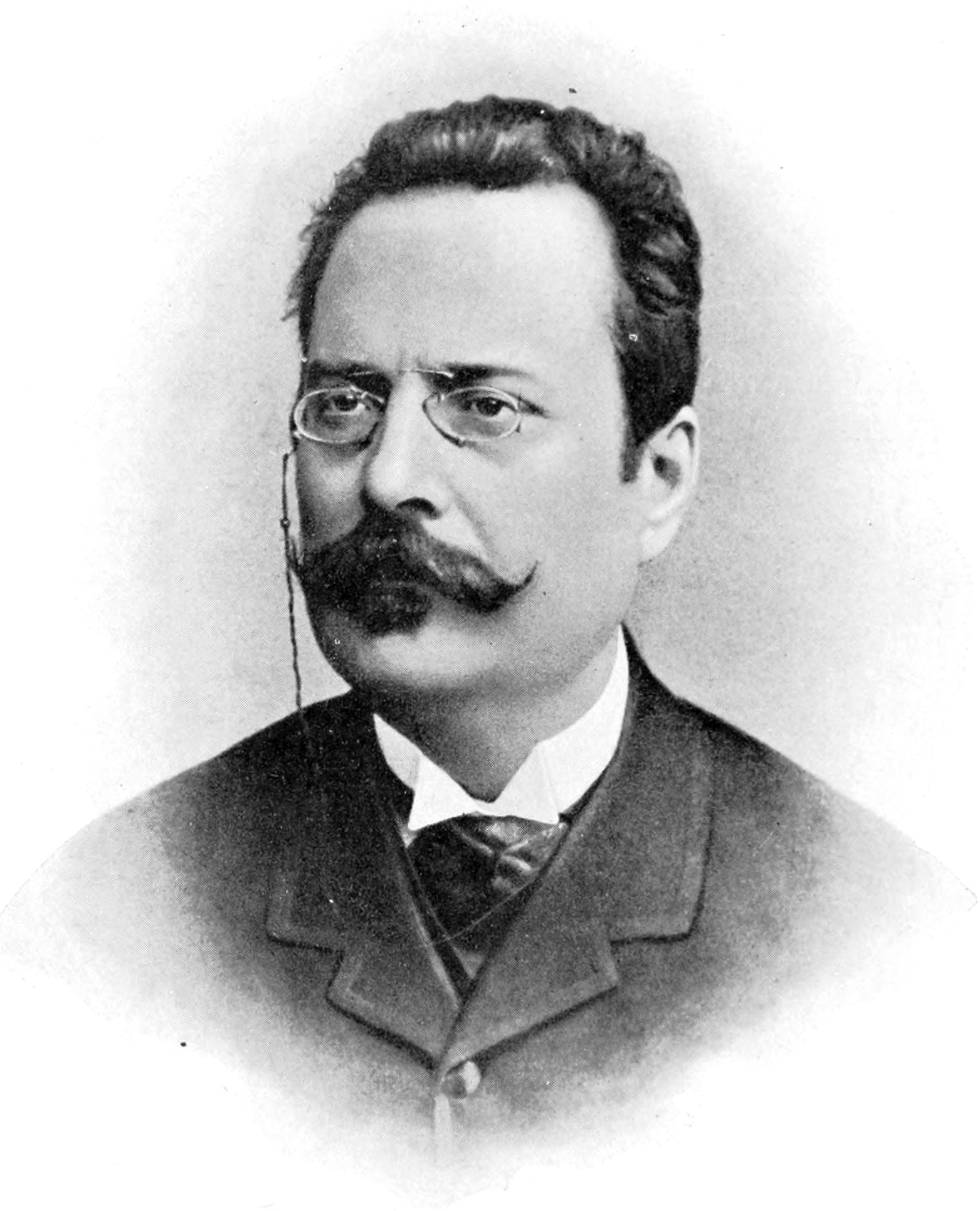
Salvatore Trinchese

Salvatore Trinchese (4 April 1836 – 11 January 1897) was an Italian zoologist who specialised in Mollusca.

== Biography ==
Salvatore Trinchese was born in Martano, a small town in the province of Lecce in Apulia, on 4 April 1836. He attended the Reale Collegio San Giuseppe of Jesuits in Lecce. In 1856, he went to Pisa to study medicine and surgery. In 1860, he graduated and obtained a scholarship which allowed him to study abroad. Thus, in the same year he moved to Paris, where he worked as a researcher in the prestigious laboratories of Claude Bernard, Henri Milne-Edwards, Emile Blanchard and Charles-Philippe Robin. During this period, he started his histological studies on the nervous system and on the systematic microscopy on gastropod molluscs. In 1865, he started to teach mineralogy, geology, zoology and comparative anatomy at the University of Genoa. Then he taught in Bologna and Naples. In 1886, he became the dean of the University of Naples and, after few years, was nominated as the city councilman.

He died of nephritis in Naples on 11 January 1897.

== Works ==
- A Francesco Puccinotti, Pisa, 1860.
- Memoria sulla terminazione periferica dei nervi motori nella serie degli animali, Genova, 1866.
- Memoria sulla struttura del sistema nervoso dei cefalopodi, Firenze, 1868.
- Sulla struttura del sistema nervoso dei molluschi gasteropodi, Pisa, 1871.
- Discorso inaugurale letto nell'universita di Bologna, Bologna, 1873.
- Note anatomiche intorno ad alcuni Eolididei, Bologna, 1874.
- Nuove ricerche sull'organizzazione del cervello degli Eolididei, Bologna, 1875.
- Ricerche anatomiche sul genere Govia, Bologna, 1886.
- Ricerche anatomiche sulla Flabellina affinis, Bologna, 1887.
- Descrizione del nuovo genere Caloria, Bologna, 1888.
- Ricerche anatomiche sulla Forestia mirabilis, Bologna, 1889.
- Contribuzione alla conoscenza dei Fusi muscolari: memoria presentata alla R. Accademia delle scienze dell'Istituto di Bologna, e letta nell'adunanza del 27 aprile, Bologna, 1890.
- Descrizione del nuovo genere Bosellia: Nota letta alla r. Accademia delle scienze dell'Istituto di Bologna nella sessione del 26 aprile 1891, Bologna, 1891.
- Ricerche sulla formazione delle piastre motrici: Memoria letta alla r. Accademia delle scienze dell'Istituto di Bologna nella sessione del 29 novembre 1891, Bologna, 1892.
- Nuove osservazioni sulla Placida viridis: Memoria letta alla r. Accademia delle scienze dell'Istituto di Bologna nella sessione dell'8 gennaio 1893, Bologna, 1893.
- Protovo e globuli polari dell'Amphorina coerulea: Comunicazione letta alla r. Accademia delle scienze dell'Istituto di Bologna nella sessione Delli 27 maggio 1894, Bologna, 1894.
- Ricerche anatomiche sul Phyllobranchus borgnini (fr. ): Memoria letta alla r. Accademia delle scienze dell'Istituto di Bologna nella sessione del 28 aprile 1895, Bologna, 1895.
- Ricerche anatomiche sulla Hermaea cremoniana (tr): Memoria letta alla r. Accademia delle scienze dell'Istituto di Bologna, nella sessione del 22 marzo 1896, Bologna, 1896.

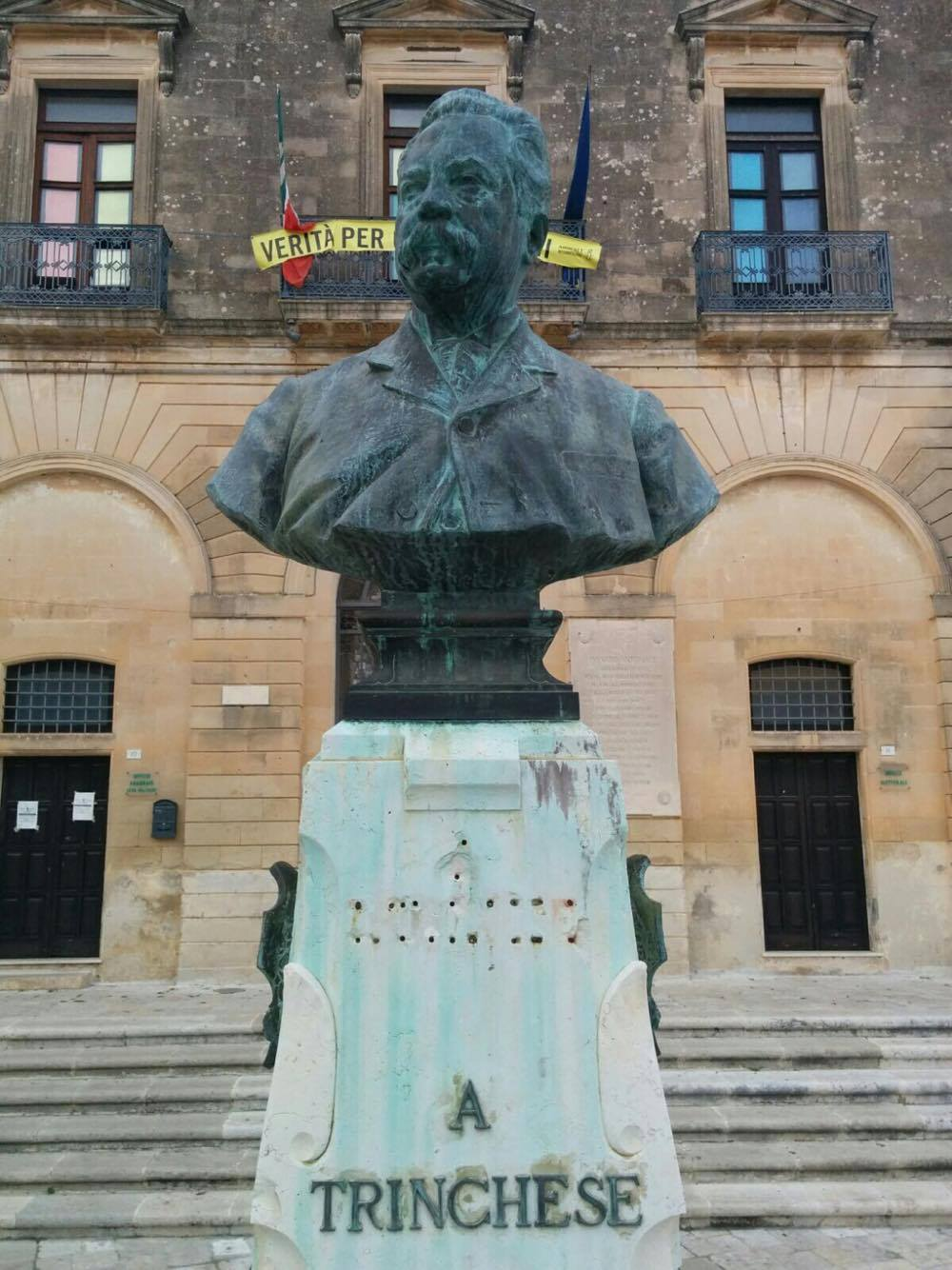
Salvatore Trinchese's bust in Martano
