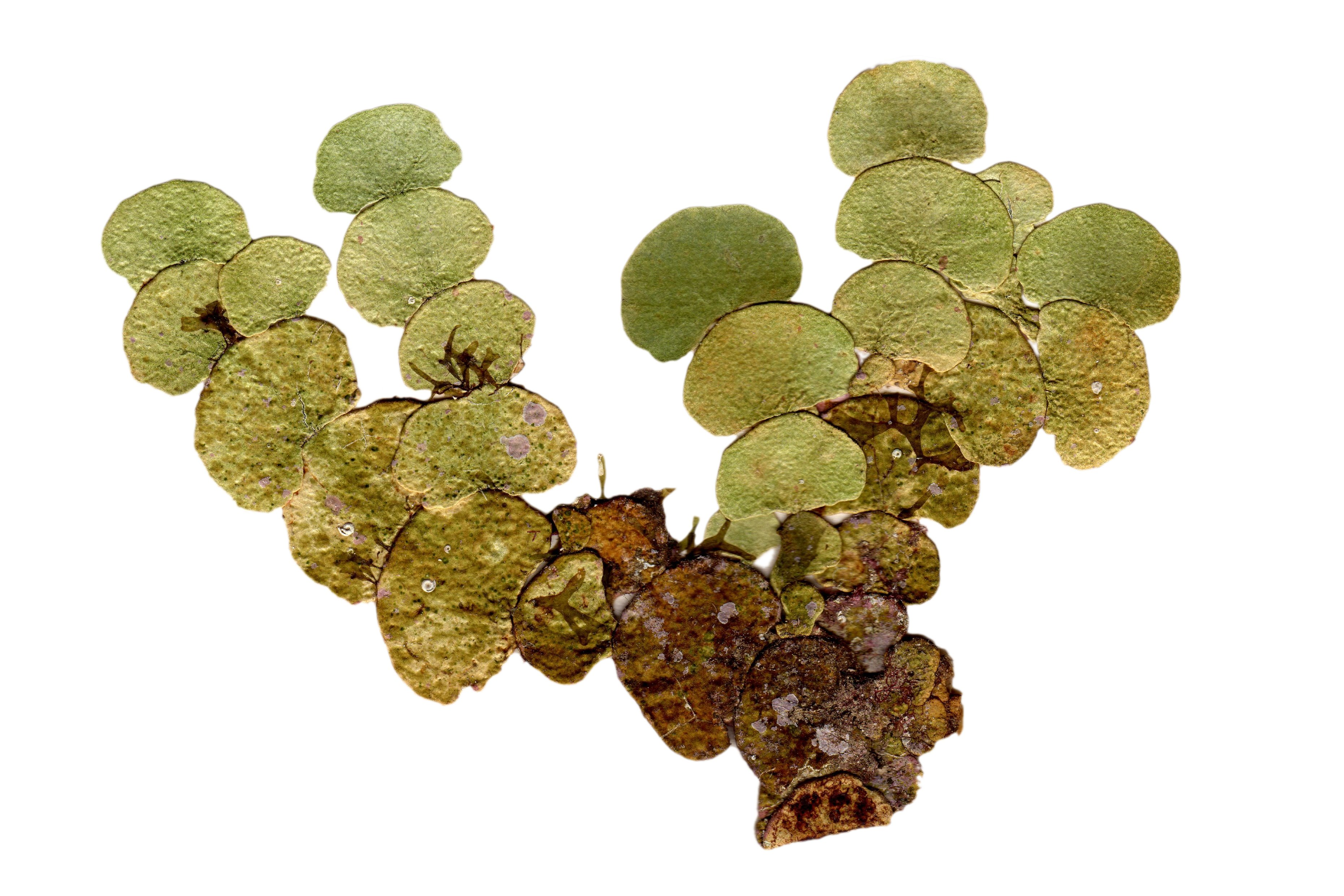

Scientific classification
- Kingdom: Plantae
- Division: Chlorophyta
- Class: Ulvophyceae
- Order: Bryopsidales
- Family: Halimedaceae; Link, 1832

Genera
- †Eugonophyllum; Flabellia; Halimeda

= Halimedaceae =

Family of algae

Halimedaceae are a family of green algae in the order Bryopsidales.
