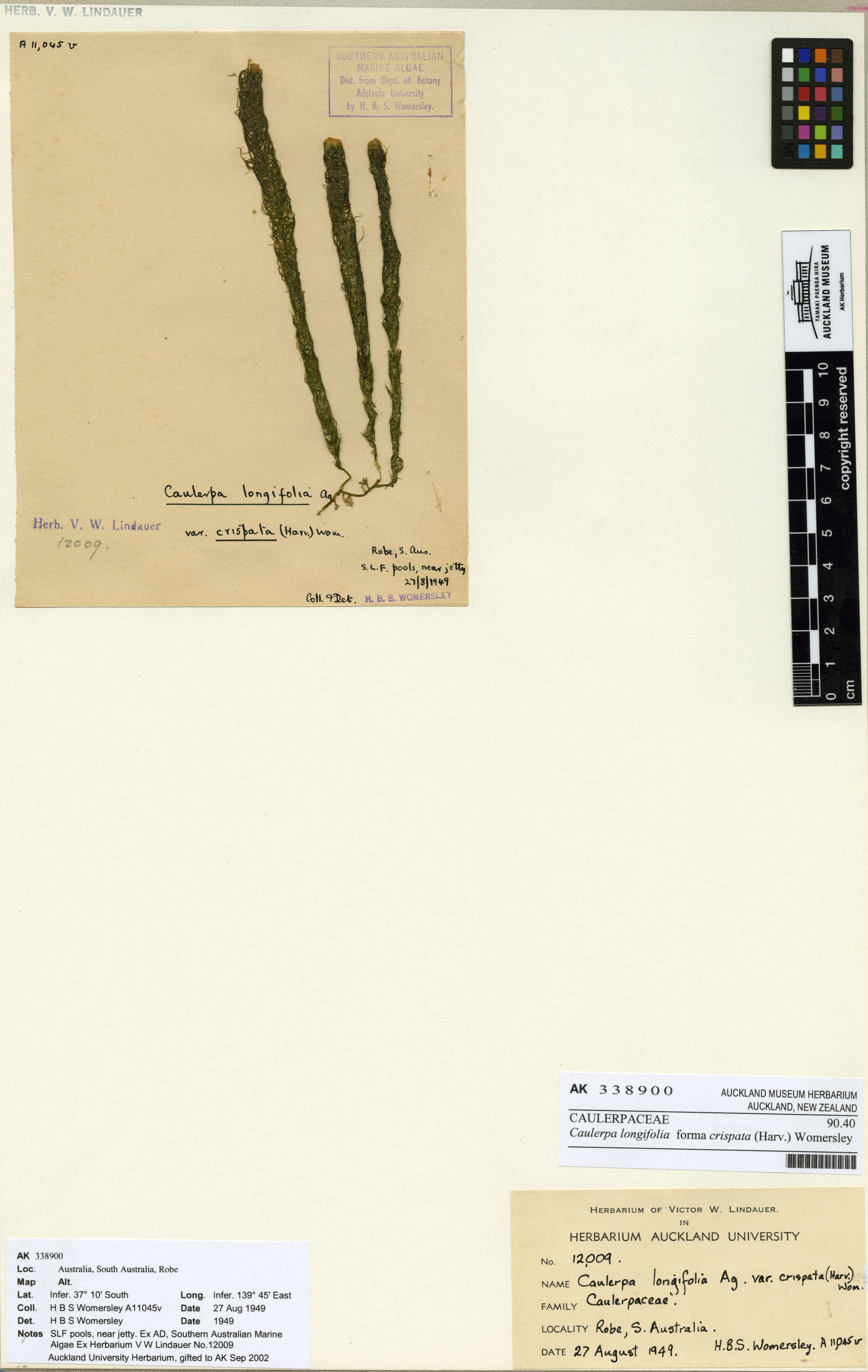

Scientific classification
- Clade: Viridiplantae
- Division: Chlorophyta
- Class: Ulvophyceae
- Order: Bryopsidales
- Family: Caulerpaceae
- Genus: Caulerpa
- Species: C. longifolia

Binomial name
- Caulerpa longifolia C.Agardh

= Caulerpa longifolia =

Feather caulerpa

Species of seaweed

Caulerpa longifolia, commonly known as feather caulerpa or long-filament caulerpa, is a species of seaweed in the Caulerpaceae family.

The seaweed has a coarse stolon with medium to dark green fronds reaching 15 to 65 centimetres (5.9 to 25.6 in) in height and 1 to 3 cm (0.39 to 1.18 in) wide. It has few upright branches that arise from a naked and coarse runner. The ends of the branches (known as ramuli) are linear or curved slightly upwards, usually occurring in five rows along the upright branches. It has a superficial similarity to Caulerpa cliftonii.

The species is found in rough coastal waters around rock pools to a depth of 40 metres (131 ft). In Western Australia, it is found along the coast from Shire of Irwin in the Mid West and south as far as Rockingham it is also found in South Australia, Victoria and Tasmania.
