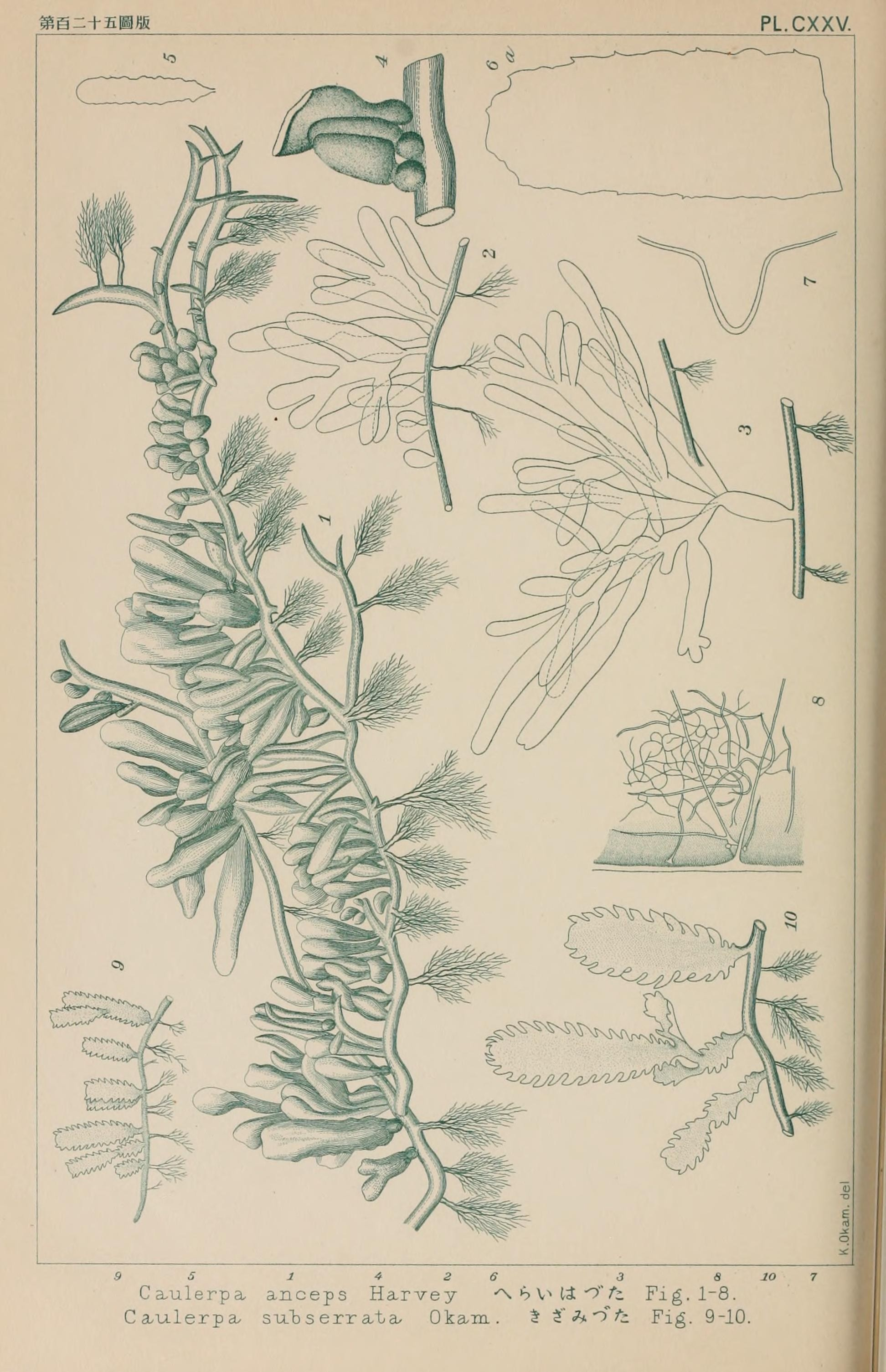

Scientific classification
- Clade: Viridiplantae
- Division: Chlorophyta
- Class: Ulvophyceae
- Order: Bryopsidales
- Family: Caulerpaceae
- Genus: Caulerpa
- Species: C. subserrata

Binomial name
- Caulerpa subserrata Okamura

= Caulerpa subserrata =

Species of alga

Caulerpa subserrata is a species of seaweed in the Caulerpaceae family.

== Description ==
The seaweed has erect fronds that arise from repeating, cylindrically shaped, branching, glabrous surculus and often two or three individuals are found together. It is flat and has a linear or elliptic to oblong shape in outline. The fronds are truncato-obtuse at apex and oval at the base tapering to a very short cylindrical stipe. The fronds are 1 to 2.5 centimetres (0.39 to 0.98 in) long and 3 to 4 millimetres (0.118 to 0.157 in) wide. It can be simple or branches by proliferations and is serrated with lobes along both margins. The lobes are short, patent and a little curved upward and subalternate.

== Taxonomy ==
The species was first formally described by the botanist Kintarô Okamura in 1897 as part of the work On the algae from Ogasawara-jima (Bonin Islands) as published in the Botanical Magazine, Tokyo.

== Distribution ==
It is found along the coast of the Bonin Islands about 500 kilometres (311 mi) south of Japan.
