= Caulerpa delicatula =

Scientific classification
- Kingdom: Plantae
- Division: Chlorophyta
- Class: Ulvophyceae
- Order: Bryopsidales
- Family: Caulerpaceae
- Genus: Caulerpa
- Species: C. delicatula

Binomial name
- Caulerpa delicatula Grunow

Species of seaweed

Caulerpa delicatula is a species of seaweed in the Caulerpaceae family.

The seaweed is light green at the base becoming a darker green distally. The thallus spreads outward to about 10 centimetres (3.9 in).

It is found along the coast in a large area extending from around the Abrolhos Islands in the Mid West, north through the Gascoyne and into the Pilbara region of Western Australia.
