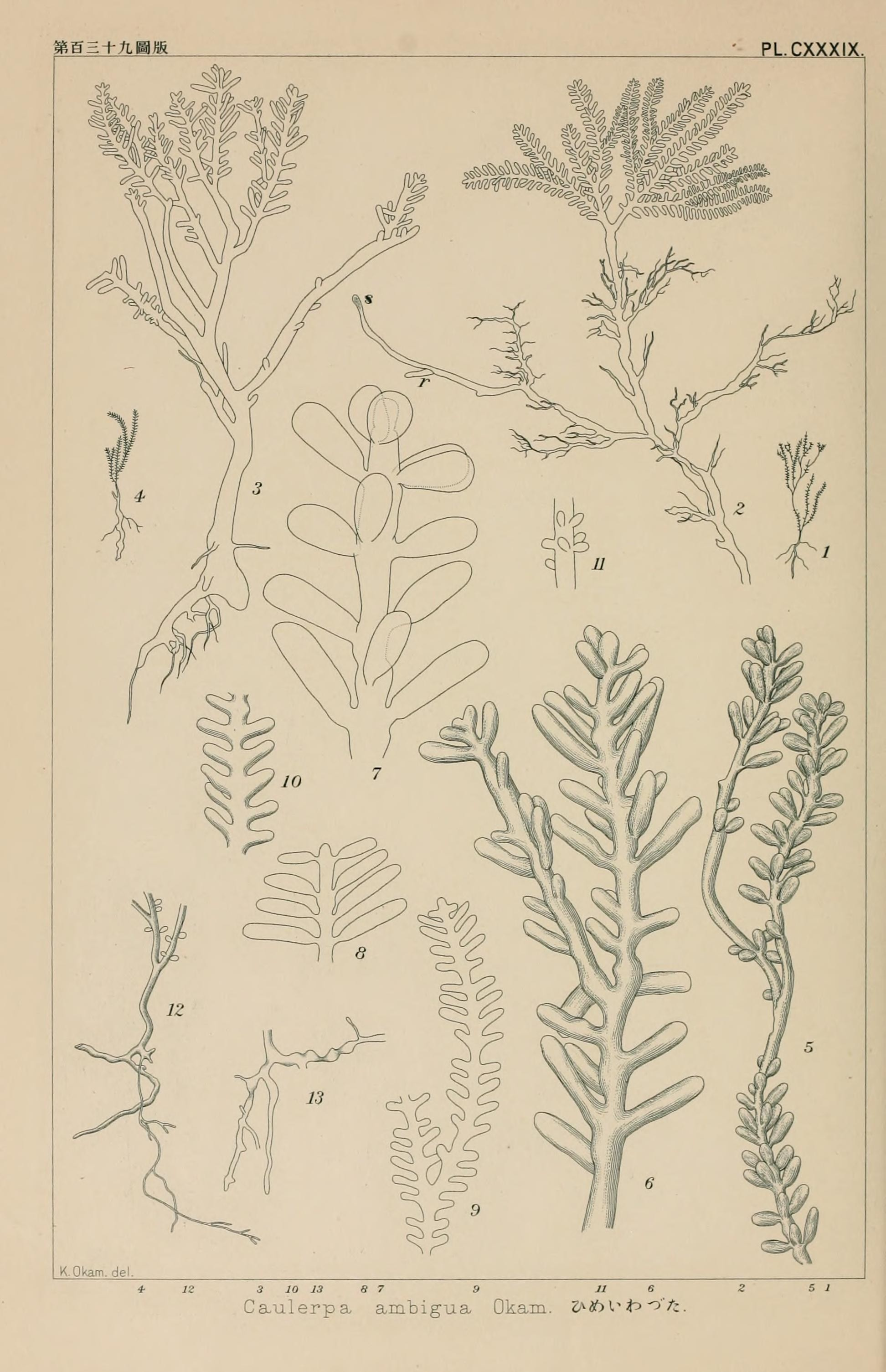

Scientific classification
- Clade: Viridiplantae
- Division: Chlorophyta
- Class: Ulvophyceae
- Order: Bryopsidales
- Family: Caulerpaceae
- Genus: Caulerpa
- Species: C. ambigua

Binomial name
- Caulerpa ambigua Okamura

= Caulerpa ambigua =

Species of alga

Caulerpa ambigua is a species of seaweed in the Caulerpaceae family found in marine waters of the Pacific Ocean near the southern end of Japan. It has a limited distribution and is endemic around the Bonin Islands around 500 km (311 mi) south of Japan.

== Description ==
It has dwarf filiform (threadlike) fronds that are typically 1 to 2 cm (0.39 to 0.79 in) in length and only 0.1 mm (0.0039 in) wide, tapering slightly along the length. The branches are arranged in a divaricate pattern and each branch is loosely closed with oppositely arranged scales called ramenta. It is similar in appearance to Caulerpa okamurai which has a larger spread of distribution.

== Taxonomy ==
Caulerpa ambigua was first formally described by Kintarô Okamura in 1897 as part of the work On the Algae from Ogasawara-jima (Bonin Islands) as published in Botanical Magazine, Tokyo. The specific epithet is taken from the Latin word meaning doubtful or uncertain.
