= Caulerpa urvilleana =

Scientific classification
- Kingdom: Plantae
- Division: Chlorophyta
- Class: Ulvophyceae
- Order: Bryopsidales
- Family: Caulerpaceae
- Genus: Caulerpa
- Species: C. urvilleana

Binomial name
- Caulerpa urvilleana Mont.

Species of seaweed

Caulerpa urvilleana is a species of seaweed in the Caulerpaceae family.

The seaweed has a grass-green to dark-green thallus.

The species is found in tropical seas in the Indian and western Pacific Oceans. In Western Australia, it is found around the Dampier Archipelago.
