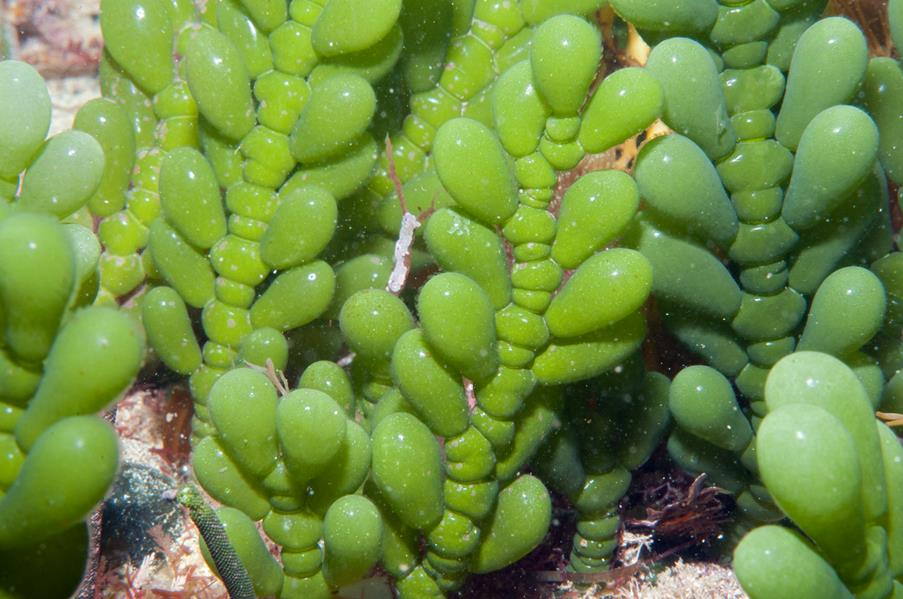

Scientific classification
- Clade: Viridiplantae
- Division: Chlorophyta
- Class: Ulvophyceae
- Order: Bryopsidales
- Family: Caulerpaceae
- Genus: Caulerpa
- Species: C. cactoides

Binomial name
- Caulerpa cactoides (Turner) C.Agardh

= Caulerpa cactoides =

Species of seaweed

Caulerpa cactoides is a species of seaweed in the Caulerpaceae family.

It is found along the coast in a large area extending from near Exmouth in the northern Gascoyne region to east of Esperance in the Goldfields-Esperance region of Western Australia.
