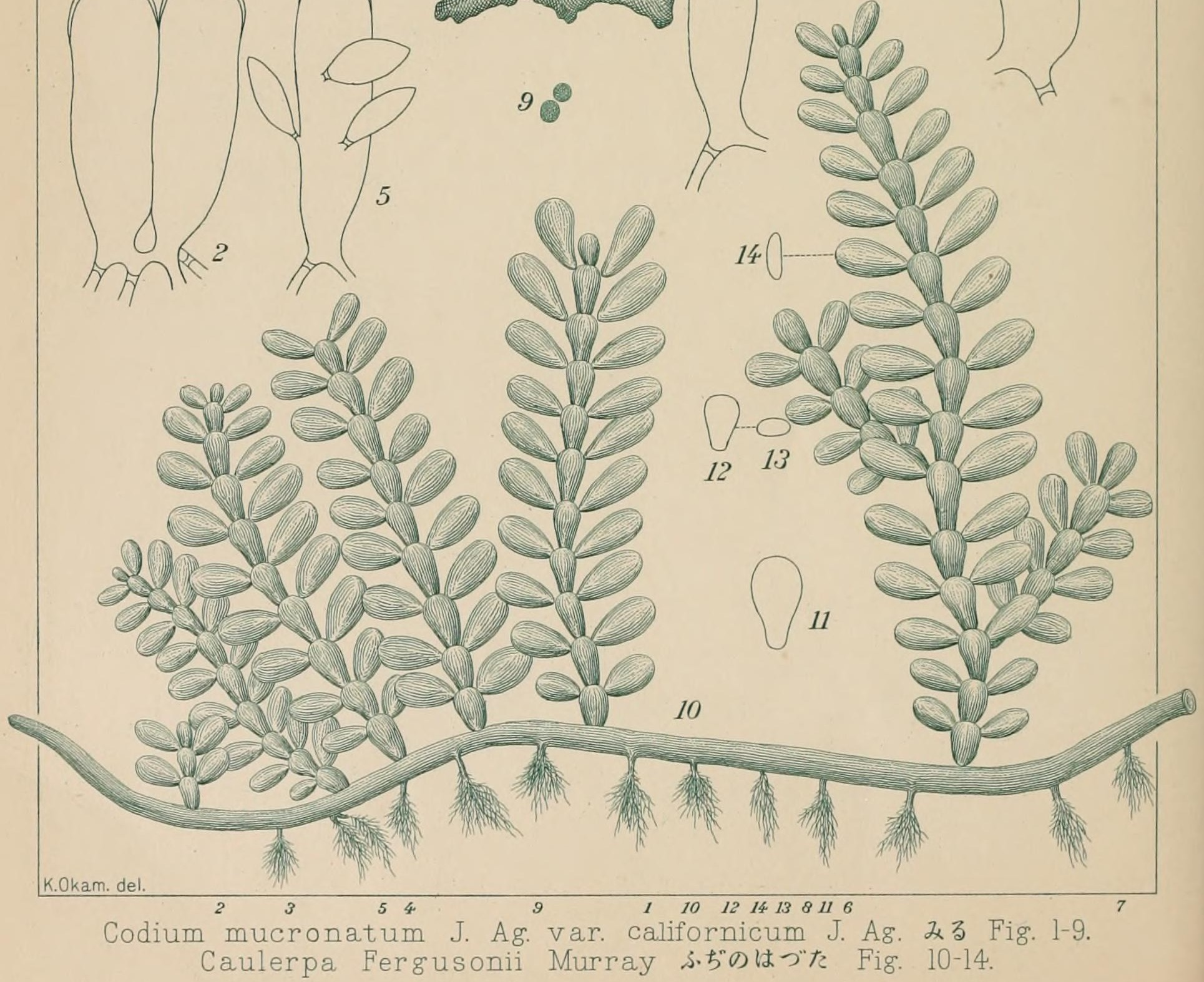

Scientific classification
- Clade: Viridiplantae
- Division: Chlorophyta
- Class: Ulvophyceae
- Order: Bryopsidales
- Family: Caulerpaceae
- Genus: Caulerpa
- Species: C. fergusonii

Binomial name
- Caulerpa fergusonii G.Murray

= Caulerpa fergusonii =

Species of seaweed

Caulerpa fergusonii is a species of seaweed in the Caulerpaceae family.

The seaweed is olive green at the base becoming a darker green distally. The thallus spreads outward to about 18 centimetres (7.1 in).

The species is found around much of Asia and the Pacific Islands as well as Australia and New Zealand. In Western Australia, it is found along the coast in a large area extending from around the Kimberley, south as far as Esperance in the Goldfields-Esperance region of Western Australia.
