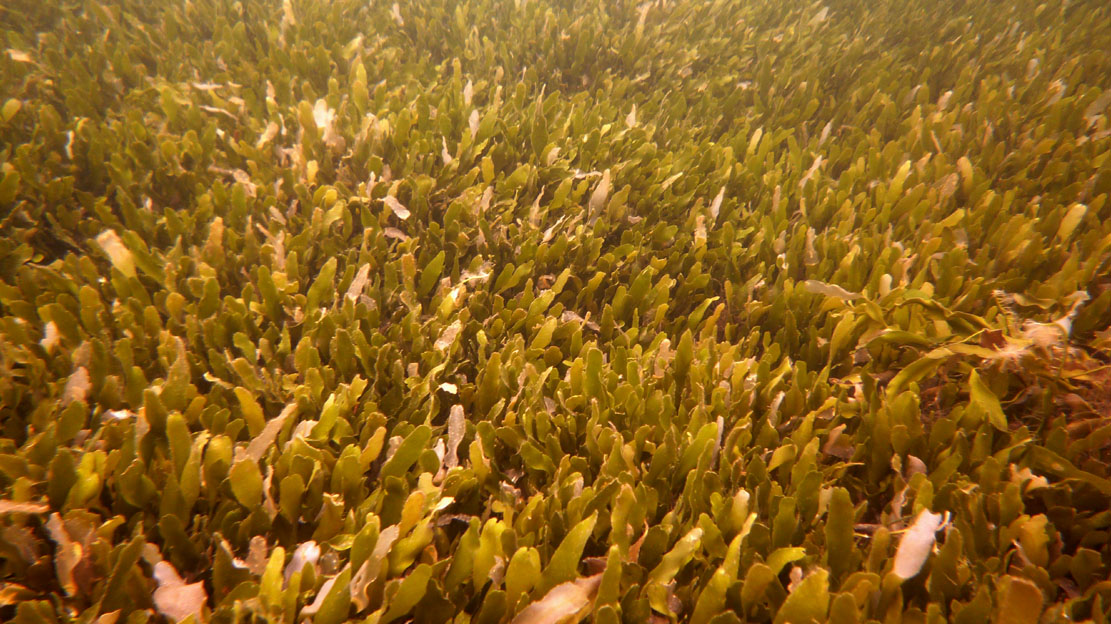

Scientific classification
- Clade: Viridiplantae
- Division: Chlorophyta
- Class: Ulvophyceae
- Order: Bryopsidales
- Family: Caulerpaceae
- Genus: Caulerpa
- Species: C. prolifera

Binomial name
- Caulerpa prolifera (Forsskål) J.V.Lamouroux, 1809

Synonyms
- Fucus prolifera Forsskål, 1775

= Caulerpa prolifera =

Species of alga

Caulerpa prolifera is a species of green alga, a seaweed in the family Caulerpaceae. It is the type species of the genus Caulerpa, the type location being Alexandria, Egypt. It grows rapidly and forms a dense mass of vegetation on shallow sandy areas of the sea.

== Description ==
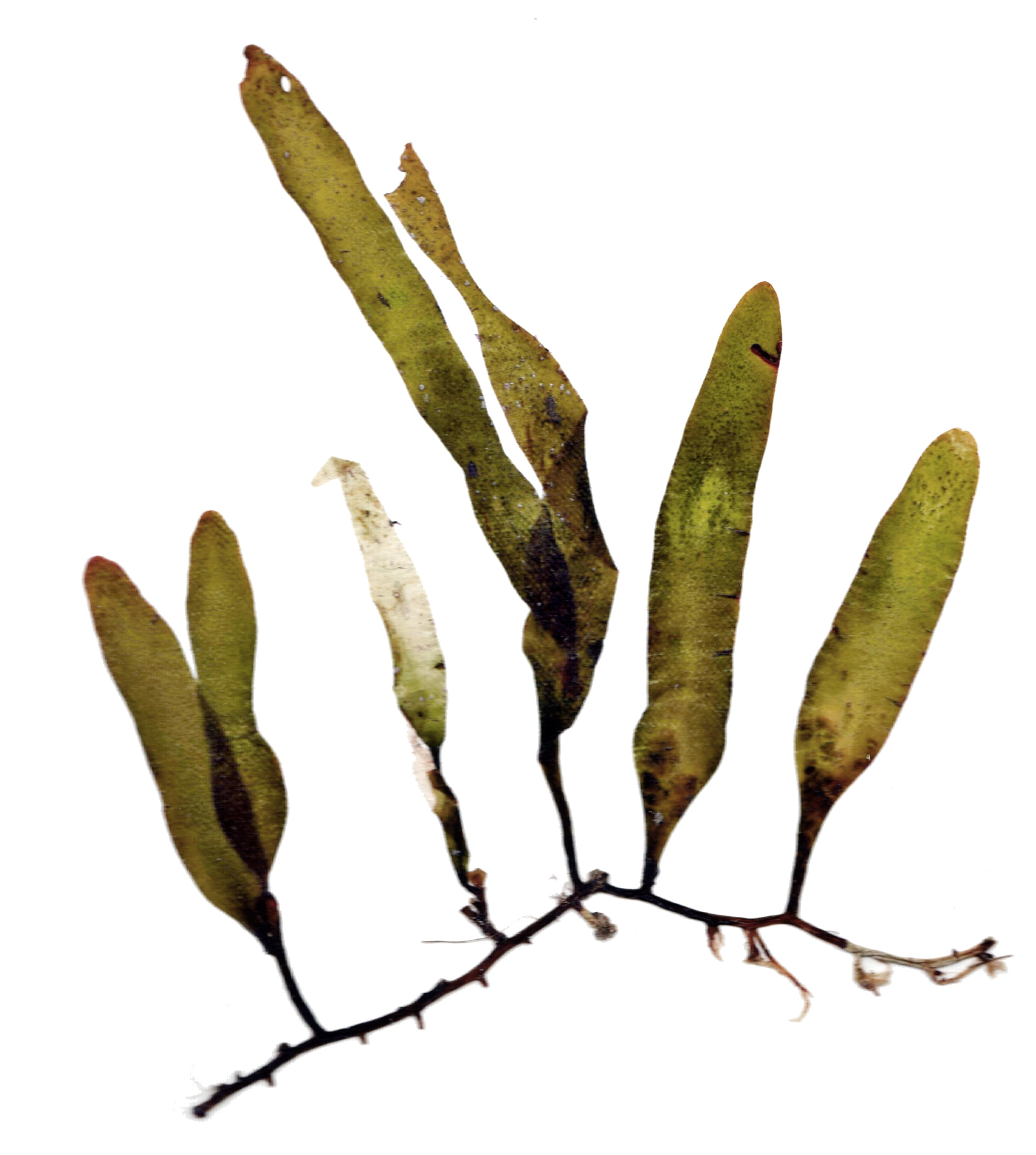
Caulerpa prolifera

A plant of C. prolifera consists of a number of blades or laminae linked by underground stolons which are fixed to the sandy substrate by rhizoids. The blades contain chlorophyll for photosynthesis though the green colour is somewhat masked by other pigments. Like other members of the order Bryopsidales, each C. prolifera plant is an individual organism consisting of a giant single cell with multiple nuclei. Chloroplasts are free to move from one part of the organism to another as a response to the level of light at any point and there is a network of fibrous proteins that facilitates movement of organelles. Even when derived from the same source, individual plants of C. prolifera show great variability of form and it has been shown that this is in part related to the level of light. In bright locations, plants are compact, highly branched and dense, while in shady locations, populations typically have blades that are longer and thinner and can more efficiently make use of the limited light available.

Two distinct forms of the alga are recognised, Caulerpa prolifera f. obovata (J.Agardh) and Caulerpa prolifera f. zosterifolia (Børgesen).

== Distribution ==
C. prolifera occurs in shallow European waters, the Mediterranean Sea and the warm eastern Atlantic Ocean and also the eastern seaboard of the United States, Mexico and Brazil, as well as certain other scattered locations.

== Biology ==
Caulerpa spp. help consolidate the seabed and enable seagrasses to colonize the area. C. prolifera grows rapidly with growth taking place at night at the tips of blades and stolons. At dawn, the new tips are white, but during the day chloroplasts move into the newly available space. If parts of the plant become covered in sediment, chloroplasts can be withdrawn and moved to more productive parts.

Under normal conditions, asexual reproduction occurs by fragmentation. Pieces of tissue only a few millimetres across are capable of growing into new seaweed.

Less usually, C. prolifera may undergo sexual reproduction by holocarpy. This may occur under conditions of stress with the entire cytoplasm undergoing gametogenesis and the original organism being left as a husk. Such conditions occurred in 2005 after the passage of Hurricane Wilma over a lagoon in the Caribbean Sea. On that occasion, there was a synchronous spawning of C. prolifera and many other siphonous green algae. Besides turbulent water movement, the hurricane caused the sea temperature to drop from 29 to 19 °C in a few hours. This thermal anomaly seems to have triggered the mass spawning.
