= Caulerpa constricta =

Scientific classification
- Kingdom: Plantae
- Division: Chlorophyta
- Class: Ulvophyceae
- Order: Bryopsidales
- Family: Caulerpaceae
- Genus: Caulerpa
- Species: C. constricta

Binomial name
- Caulerpa constricta I.R.Price, Huisman & Borow

Species of seaweed

Caulerpa constricta is a species of seaweed in the Caulerpaceae family.

It is found along the coast in a few small areas near Exmouth in the northern Gascoyne region, around the Abrolhos Islands in the Mid West and near Karratha in the Pilbara region of Western Australia.
