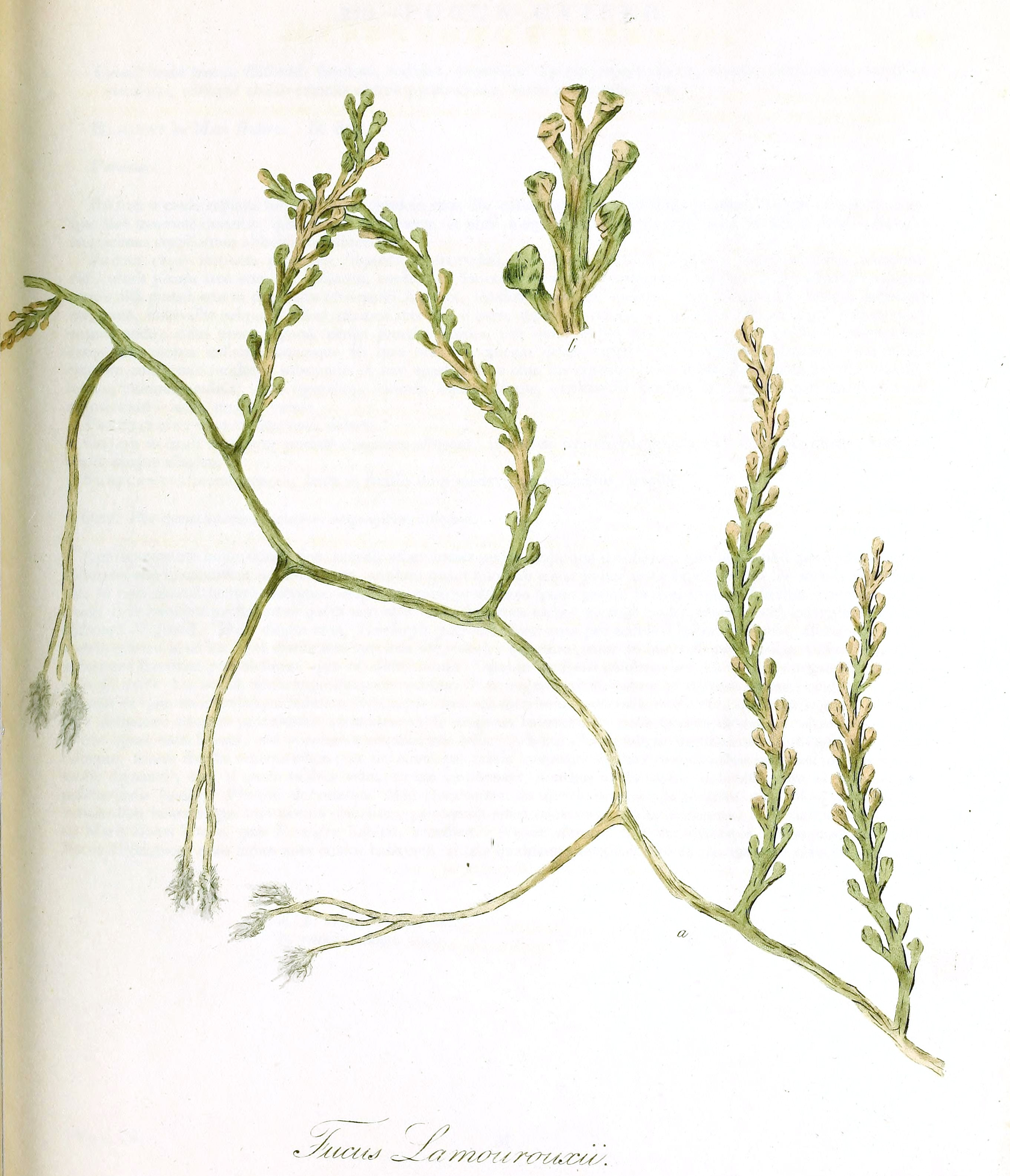

Scientific classification
- Clade: Viridiplantae
- Division: Chlorophyta
- Class: Ulvophyceae
- Order: Bryopsidales
- Family: Caulerpaceae
- Genus: Caulerpa
- Species: C. lamourouxii

Binomial name
- Caulerpa lamourouxii (Turner) C.Agardh

= Caulerpa lamourouxii =

Species of alga

Caulerpa lamourouxii is a species of seaweed in the Caulerpaceae family.

The seaweed has a grass green to olive green thallus with erect grey-green fronds reaching 30 centimetres (11.8 in) in width with smooth stolons that have a diameter of 2 to 4 mm (0.08 to 0.16 in).

The species is usually found in shallow waters in sandy substrata in tropical waters of the Indian Ocean and the Red Sea. In Western Australia, it is found along the coast from Kimberley, through the Pilbara and south as far as Ningaloo reef in the Gascoyne region of Western Australia. and east into Northern Territory waters.
