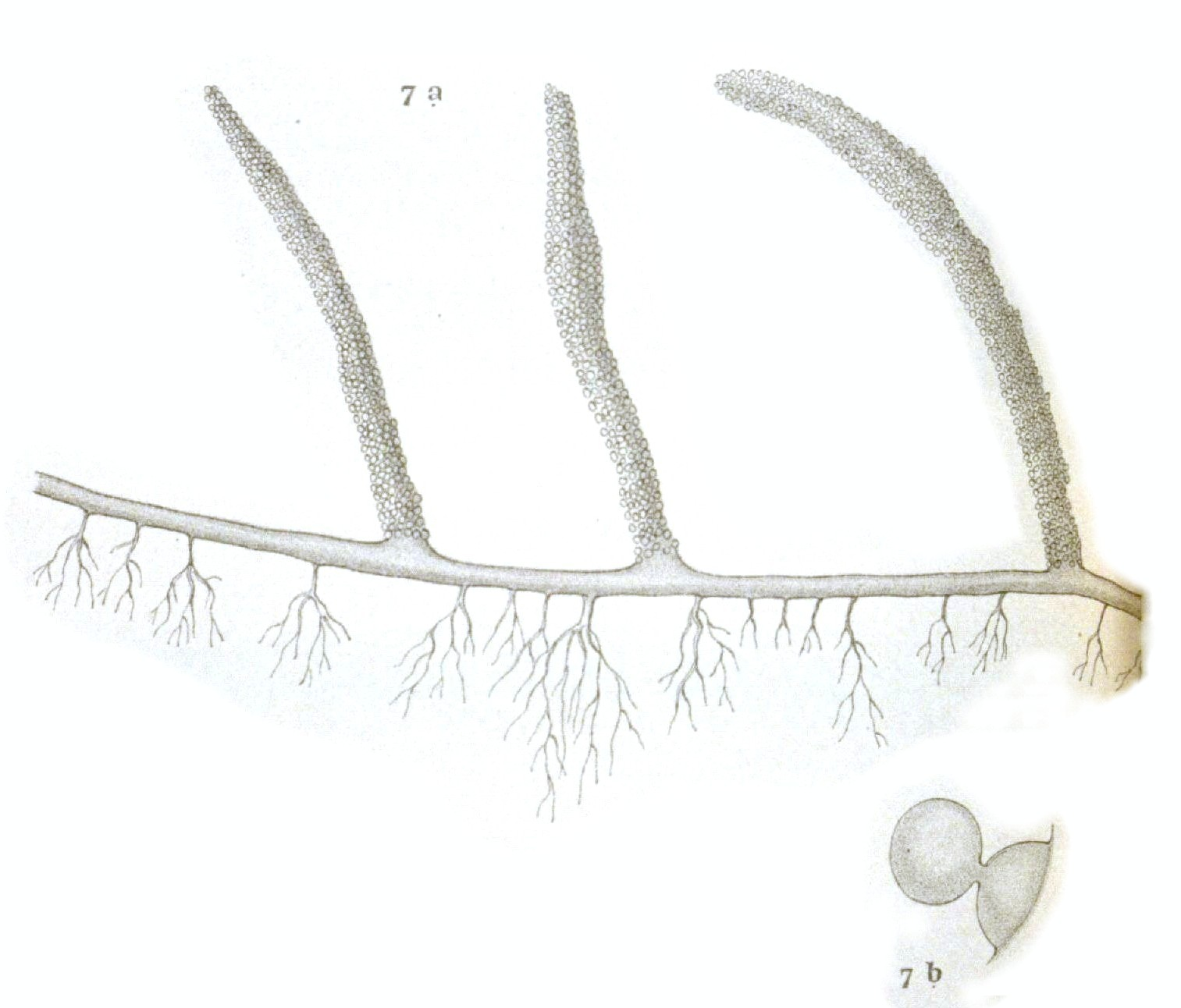

Scientific classification
- Kingdom: Plantae
- Division: Chlorophyta
- Class: Ulvophyceae
- Order: Bryopsidales
- Family: Caulerpaceae
- Genus: Caulerpa
- Species: C. agardhii

Binomial name
- Caulerpa agardhii Weber Bosse, 1898

= Caulerpa agardhii =

Species of seaweed

Caulerpa agardhii is a species of seaweed in the Caulerpaceae family.

It is found along the coast in a small area in the Kimberley region of Western Australia.
