= Caulerpa vesiculifera =

Scientific classification
- Clade: Viridiplantae
- Division: Chlorophyta
- Class: Ulvophyceae
- Order: Bryopsidales
- Family: Caulerpaceae
- Genus: Caulerpa
- Species: C. vesiculifera

Binomial name
- Caulerpa vesiculifera Harv.

Species of seaweed

Caulerpa vesiculifera is a species of seaweed in the Caulerpaceae family.

The seaweed has a robust stolon with erect form, of a medium to deep green colour that grow upward to 8 to 35 centimetres (3.1 to 13.8 in) forming dense low mats.

The species is found in the sublittoral zone in rough waters in rock pools. In Western Australia, it is found along the coast in from Shark Bay extending south to Esperance, also found in Victoria and Tasmania.
