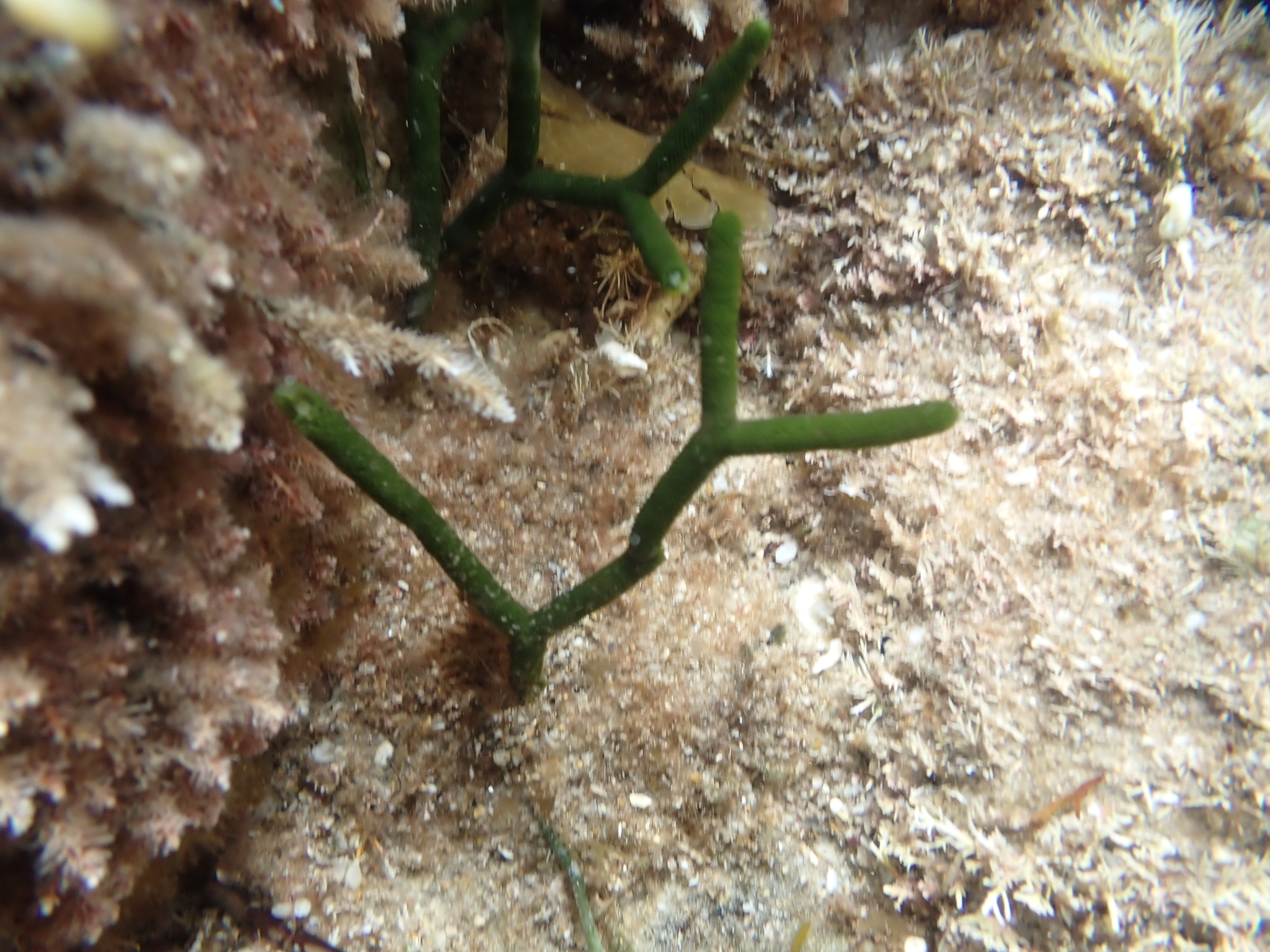

Scientific classification
- Clade: Viridiplantae
- Division: Chlorophyta
- Class: Ulvophyceae
- Order: Bryopsidales
- Family: Caulerpaceae
- Genus: Caulerpa
- Species: C. papillosa

Binomial name
- Caulerpa papillosa J.Agardh

= Caulerpa papillosa =

Species of seaweed

Caulerpa papillosa is a species of seaweed in the Caulerpaceae family.

The seaweed has a slender stolon with medium to dark green fronds reaching 4 to 16 centimetres (1.6 to 6.3 in) in height and 2 to 5 millimetres (0.079 to 0.197 in) wide.

The species is found in shaded rock pools in the upper sublittoral region up to a depth of 12 metres (39 ft). In Western Australia, it is found along the coast in the Gascoyne and south as far as Esperance it is also found in South Australia, Victoria and Tasmania.
