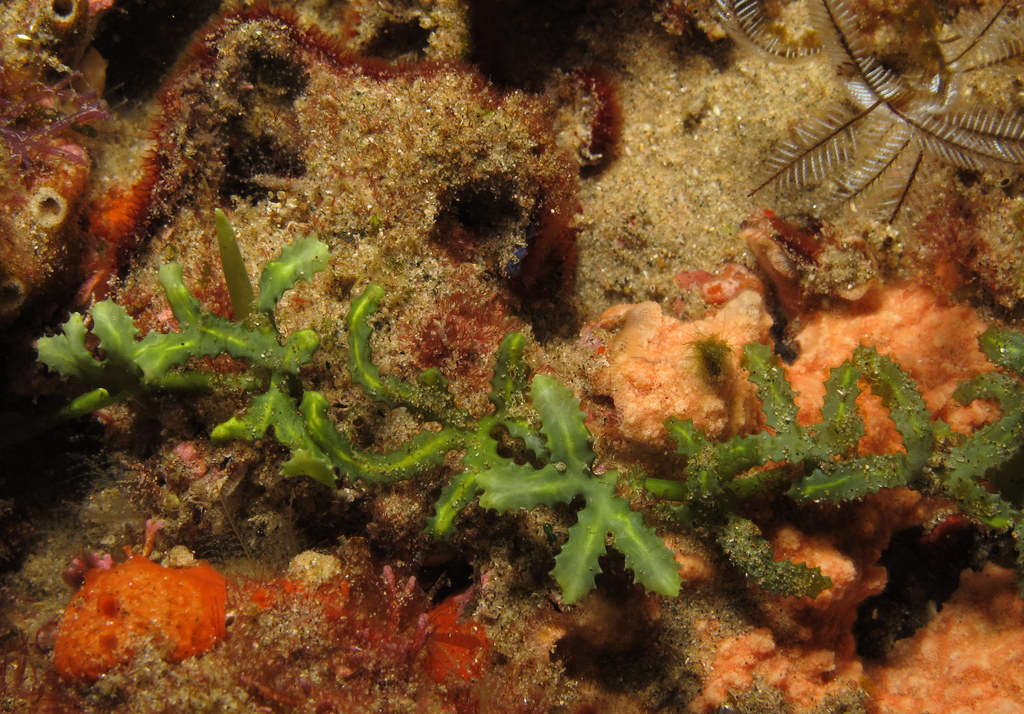
- Caulerpa serrulata at Ponta do Ouro, Mozambique

Scientific classification
- Clade: Viridiplantae
- Division: Chlorophyta
- Class: Ulvophyceae
- Order: Bryopsidales
- Family: Caulerpaceae
- Genus: Caulerpa
- Species: C. serrulata

Binomial name
- Caulerpa serrulata (Forssk.) J.Agardh

= Caulerpa serrulata =

Species of seaweed

Caulerpa serrulata, commonly known as cactus tree alga or serrated green seaweed, is a species of seaweed in the Caulerpaceae family found in warm marine water environments.

== Description ==
The seaweed has a green to grey-green thallus that typically grows to outward to around 30 centimetres (11.8 in). It has small blades that have serrated edges and grow upward from long, cylindrically shaped runners anchored to the substrate. The blades are often forked and less frequently twisted. Each of the blades is to around 3 centimetres (1.2 in) long. The blades are light to medium mint green in colour, frequently with bluish tints.

== Distribution ==
The species is found in intertidal and subtidal zones in tropical waters. It grows on shallow rocky surfaces, often with a shallow sand covering in sheltered environments and to a depth of around 5 metres (16 ft). It is found in the Caribbean from south Florida and around the Bahamas. In Western Australia, it is found along the coast in the Kimberley region extending south to the Gascoyne. It is also found around India, Singapore and other parts of south east Asia and the east coast of Africa.

== Uses ==
This seaweed is said to be edible and is used to lower blood pressure and as an antibacterial and antifungal agent in medicines.
