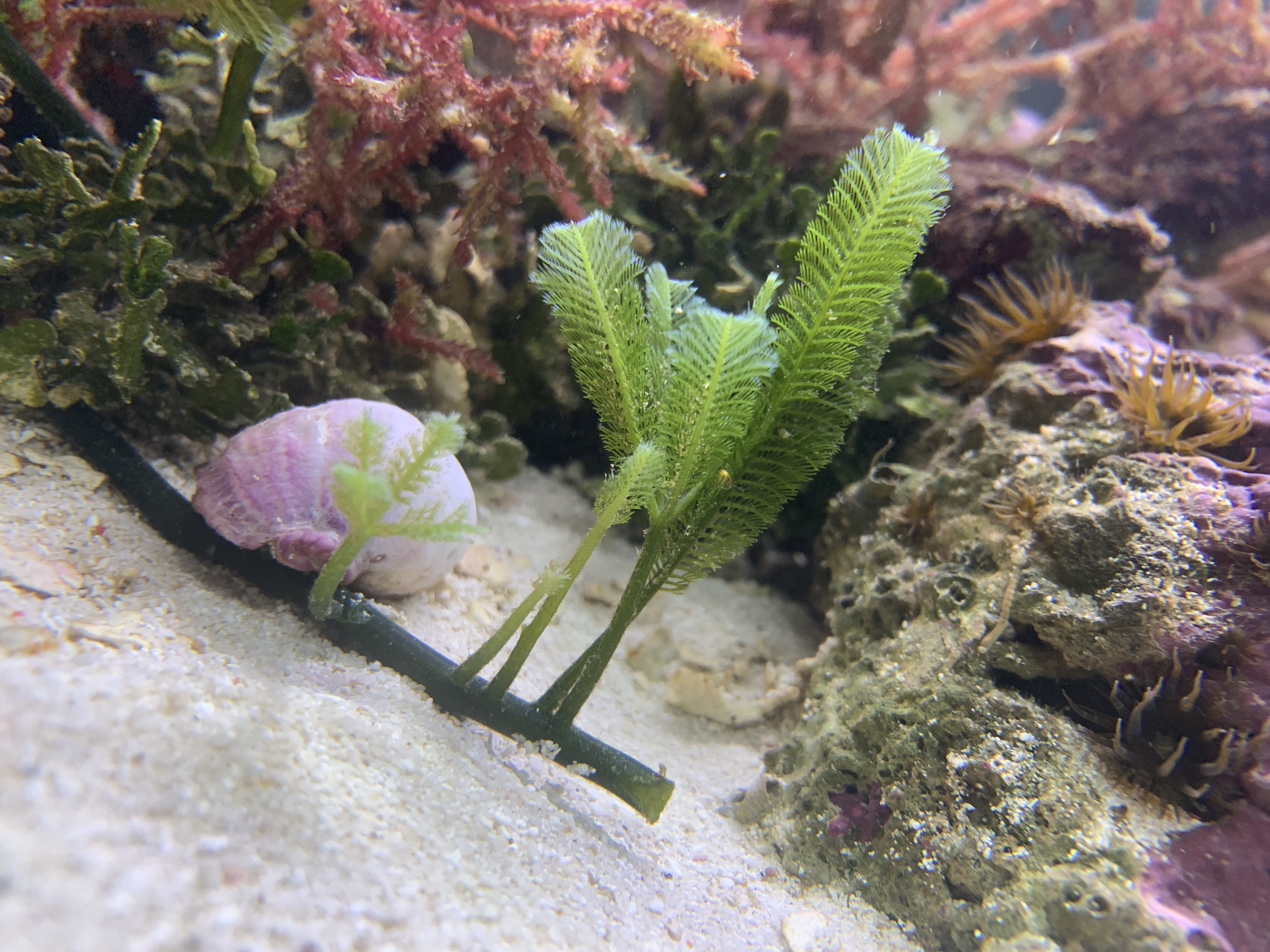

Scientific classification
- Clade: Viridiplantae
- Division: Chlorophyta
- Class: Ulvophyceae
- Order: Bryopsidales
- Family: Caulerpaceae
- Genus: Caulerpa
- Species: C. paspaloides

Binomial name
- Caulerpa paspaloides (Bory de Saint-Vincent) Greville

Synonyms
- Chauvinia paspaloides Bory de Saint-Vincent

= Caulerpa paspaloides =

Species of seaweed

Caulerpa paspaloides is a species of seaweed in the family Caulerpaceae. The species is native to the Caribbean Sea, Gulf of Mexico, and off the coast of northern Brazil.

Three forms and five varieties are accepted.

- Caulerpa paspaloides f. flabellata Weber-van Bosse
- Caulerpa paspaloides f. phleoides (Bory de Saint-Vincent) Weber-van Bosse
- Caulerpa paspaloides f. phyllaphlaston (G.Murray) Weber-van Bosse
- Caulerpa paspaloides var. compressa (Weber Bosse) M.Howe
- Caulerpa paspaloides var. laxa Weber Bosse
- Caulerpa paspaloides var. minima Humm & S.E.Taylor
- Caulerpa paspaloides var. wurdemannii Weber Bosse
