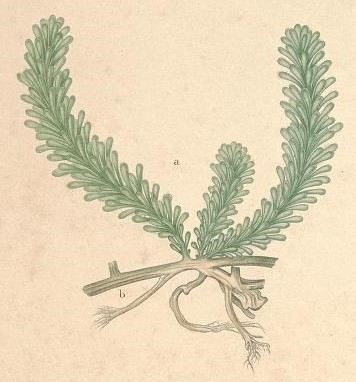
- illustration of Caulerpa chemnitzia var. laetevirens

Scientific classification
- Clade: Viridiplantae
- Division: Chlorophyta
- Class: Ulvophyceae
- Order: Bryopsidales
- Family: Caulerpaceae
- Genus: Caulerpa
- Species: C. chemnitzia

Binomial name
- Caulerpa chemnitzia (Esper) J.V.Lamour.

= Caulerpa chemnitzia =

Species of seaweed

Caulerpa chemnitzia is a species of seaweed in the Caulerpaceae family.

It is found along the coast in a large area extending from north of Perth to the Kimberley region of Western Australia.
