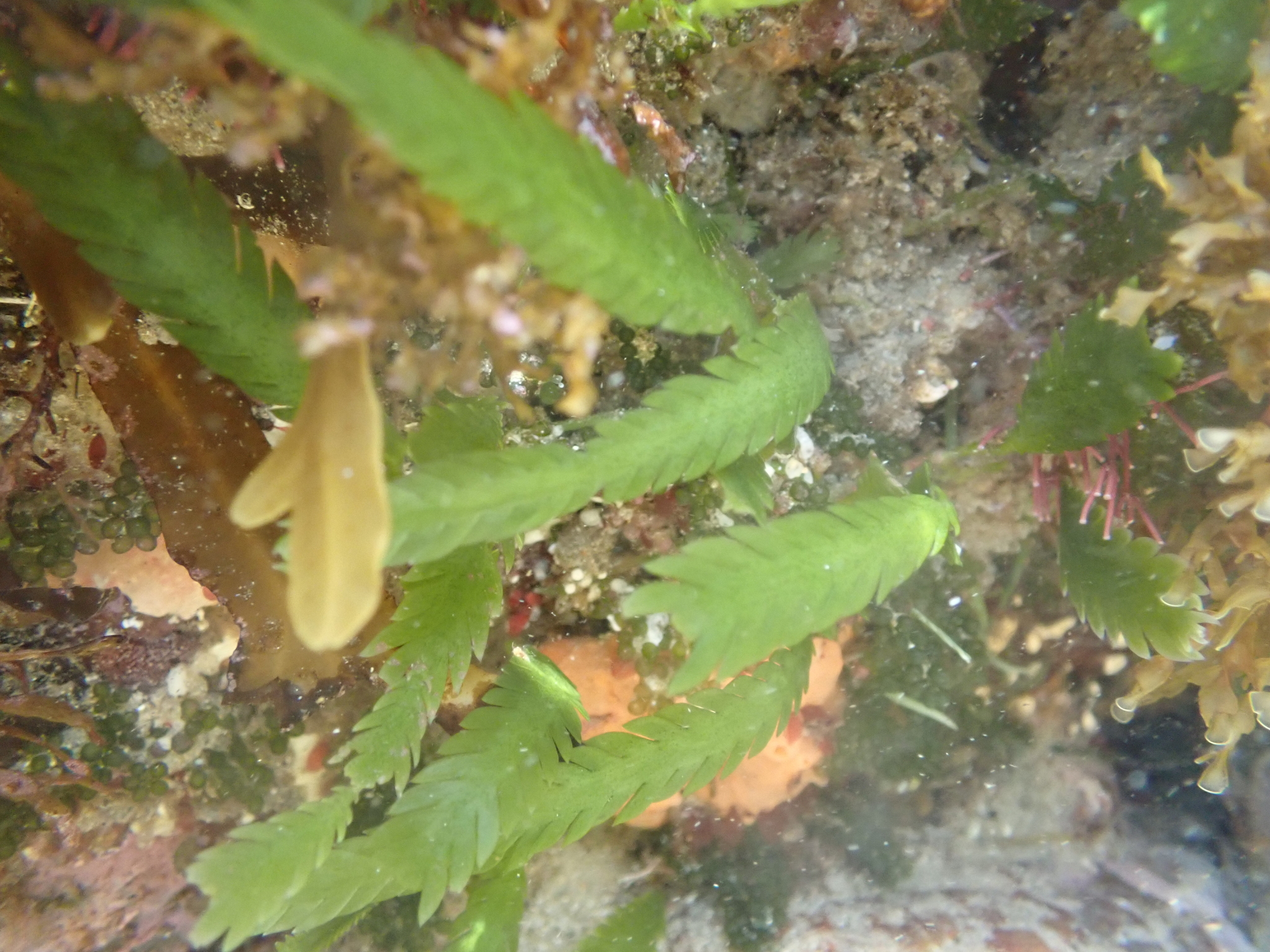
- Caulerpa scalpelliformis

Scientific classification
- Clade: Viridiplantae
- Division: Chlorophyta
- Class: Ulvophyceae
- Order: Bryopsidales
- Family: Caulerpaceae
- Genus: Caulerpa
- Species: C. scalpelliformis

Binomial name
- Caulerpa scalpelliformis (Turner) C.Agardh

= Caulerpa scalpelliformis =

Species of alga

Caulerpa scalpelliformis is a species of seaweed in the Caulerpaceae family.

The epilithic green seaweed typically grows to a height of 20 centimetres (7.9 in) and has erect fronds that are about 3 cm (1.18 in) wide.

The species is found in rock pools up to 30 metres (98 ft) deep in rough waters. In Western Australia, it is found along the coast in the Mid West region and along much of the southern coastline. The range extends to Tasmania and as far as New South Wales around Jervis Bay.
