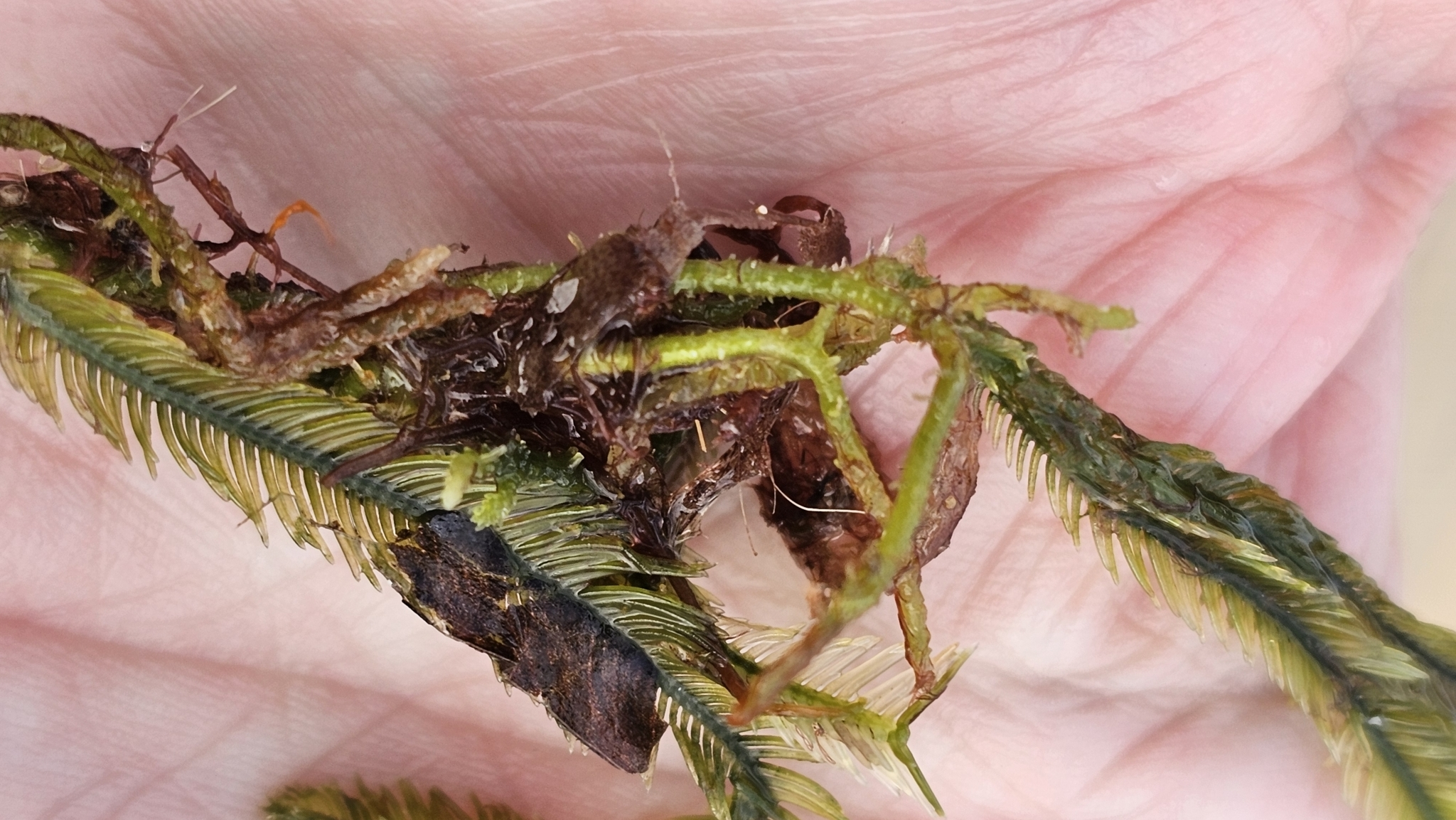

Scientific classification
- Clade: Viridiplantae
- Division: Chlorophyta
- Class: Ulvophyceae
- Order: Bryopsidales
- Family: Caulerpaceae
- Genus: Caulerpa
- Species: C. trifaria

Binomial name
- Caulerpa trifaria Harv.

= Caulerpa trifaria =

Species of seaweed

Caulerpa trifaria is a species of seaweed in the Caulerpaceae family.

The seaweed has a slender stolon and green fronds that typically grow to 5 to 25 centimetres (2.0 to 9.8 in) in height with a width of 4 to 12 millimetres (0.16 to 0.47 in).

The species is usually found in calm sheltered waters at depths of 2 to 30 metres (7 to 98 ft). In Western Australia, it is found along the coast around Perth extending south to around Esperance. It is also found in Victoria and Tasmania.
