= Caulerpa ellistoniae =

Scientific classification
- Clade: Viridiplantae
- Division: Chlorophyta
- Class: Ulvophyceae
- Order: Bryopsidales
- Family: Caulerpaceae
- Genus: Caulerpa
- Species: C. ellistoniae

Binomial name
- Caulerpa ellistoniae Womersley

Species of seaweed

Caulerpa ellistoniae is a species of seaweed in the family Caulerpaceae.

The seaweed has a robust stolon with a diameter of approximately 2 to 4 millimetres (0.08 to 0.16 in). The dark green fronds are erect and branch many times with a length of 10 to 25 centimetres (3.9 to 9.8 in).

It is found along the coast in the South West region of Western Australia spreading north as far as Perth usually in deeper water.
