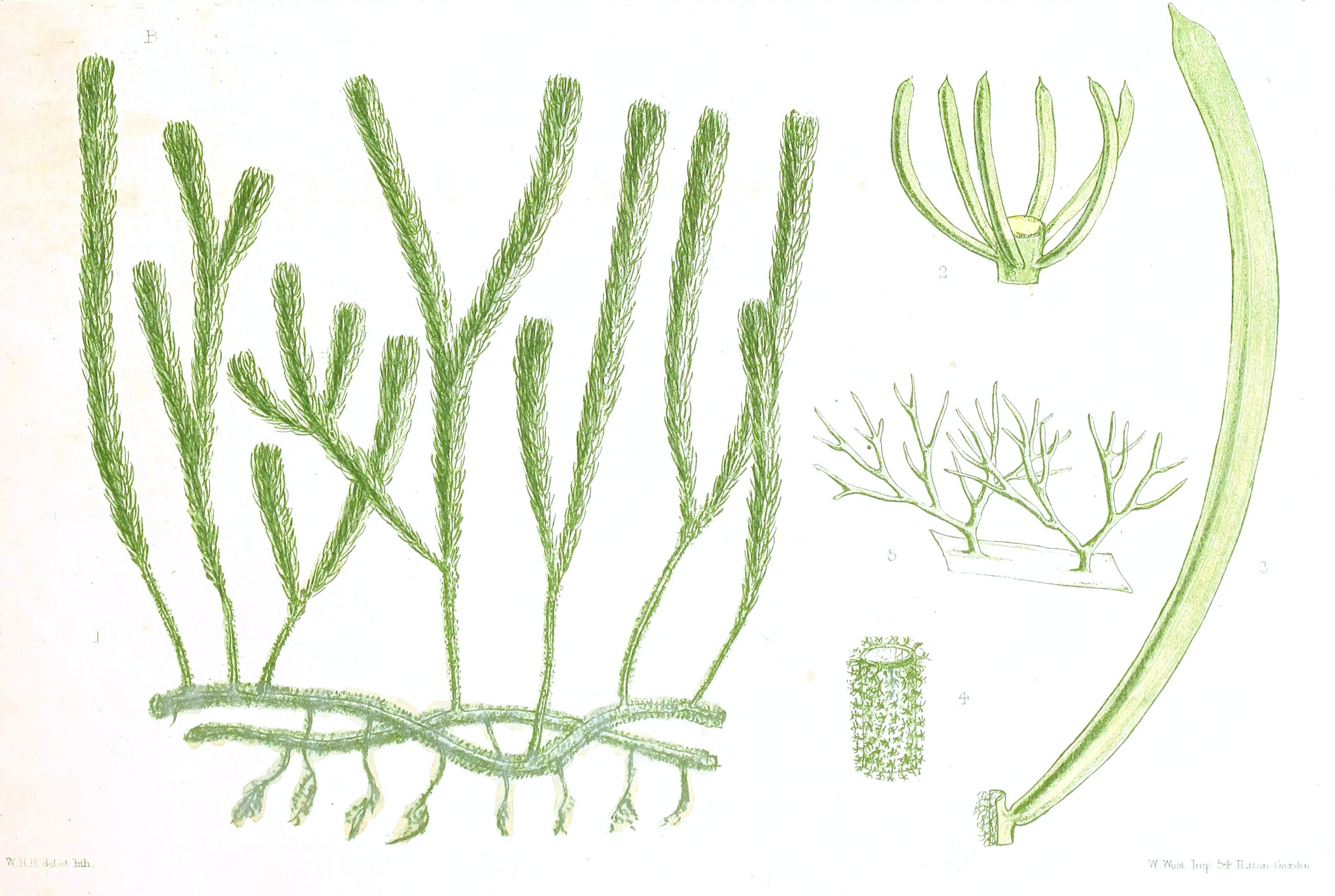

Scientific classification
- Kingdom: Plantae
- Division: Chlorophyta
- Class: Ulvophyceae
- Order: Bryopsidales
- Family: Caulerpaceae
- Genus: Caulerpa
- Species: C. lanuginosa

Binomial name
- Caulerpa lanuginosa J.Agardh

= Caulerpa lanuginosa =

Species of seaweed

Caulerpa lanuginosa is a species of seaweed in the Caulerpaceae family.

The species is found in a small area along the coast in the Pilbara region of Western Australia.
