= Caulerpa hedleyi =

Scientific classification
- Clade: Viridiplantae
- Division: Chlorophyta
- Class: Ulvophyceae
- Order: Bryopsidales
- Family: Caulerpaceae
- Genus: Caulerpa
- Species: C. hedleyi

Binomial name
- Caulerpa hedleyi Weber Bosse

Species of seaweed

Caulerpa hedleyi is a species of seaweed in the Caulerpaceae family.

The seaweed has a robust stolon with erect grey-green fronds reaching 3 to 8 centimetres (1.2 to 3.1 in) in height and 1 to 3 cm (0.39 to 1.18 in) wide.

The species is found in deep heavily shaded waters. In Western Australia, it is found along the coast from Rottnest Island and south as far as Esperance in the Goldfields-Esperance region of Western Australia and east to South Australia.
