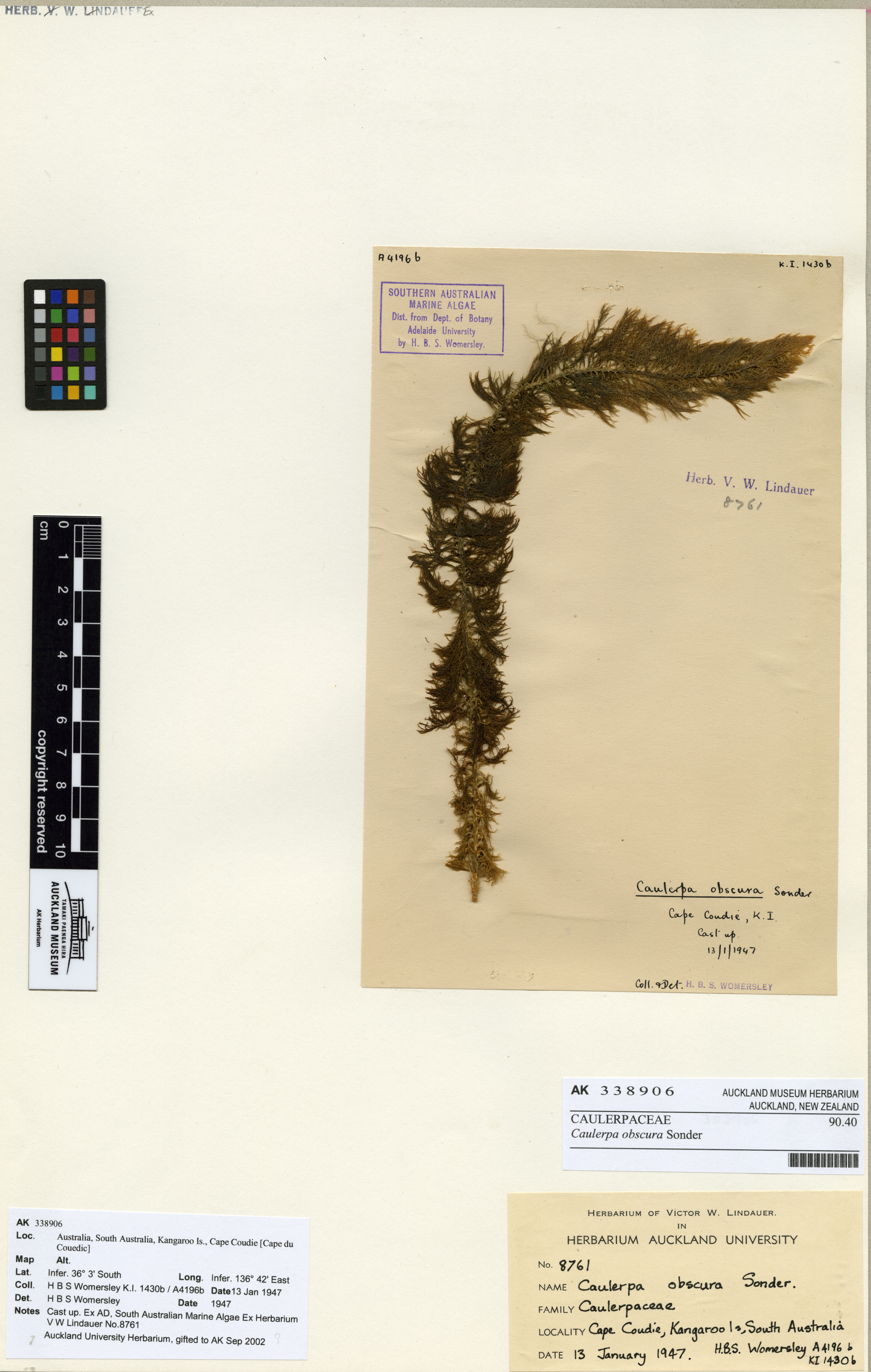
- C. obscura herbarium specimen

Scientific classification
- Clade: Viridiplantae
- Division: Chlorophyta
- Class: Ulvophyceae
- Order: Bryopsidales
- Family: Caulerpaceae
- Genus: Caulerpa
- Species: C. obscura

Binomial name
- Caulerpa obscura Sond.

= Caulerpa obscura =

Species of seaweed

Caulerpa obscura is a species of seaweed in the Caulerpaceae family.

The seaweed has a robust stolon with simple dark green fronds reaching 10 to 30 centimetres (3.9 to 11.8 in) in height and 2 to 6 cm (0.79 to 2.36 in) wide.

The species is found in rock pools and platforms in the upper sublittoral region up to a depth of 35 metres (115 ft). In Western Australia, it is found along the coast in the Mid West and south as far as Esperance it is also found in South Australia, Victoria and Tasmania.
