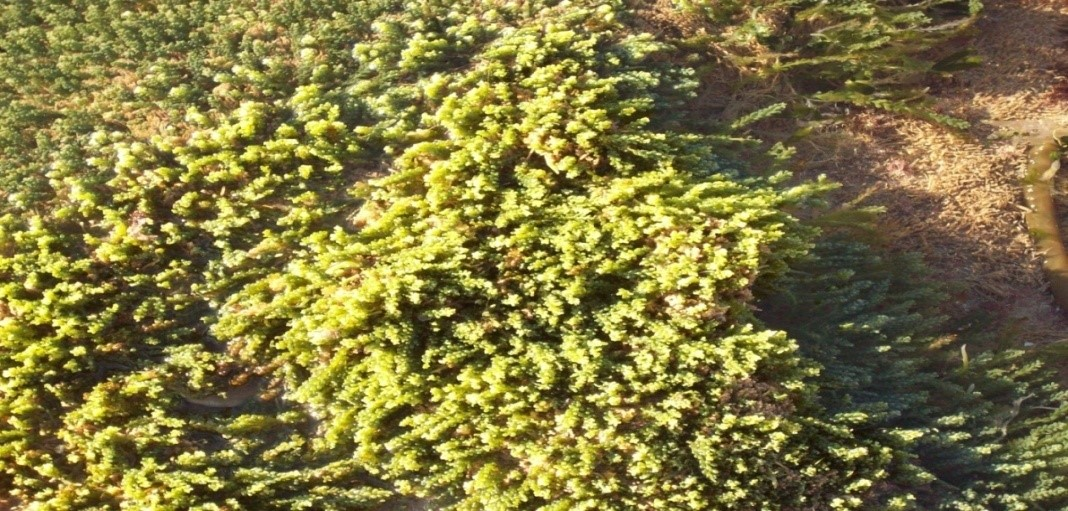
- Dense colonies of invasive Caulerpa cylindracea in Algeria

Scientific classification
- Clade: Viridiplantae
- Division: Chlorophyta
- Class: Ulvophyceae
- Order: Bryopsidales
- Family: Caulerpaceae
- Genus: Caulerpa
- Species: C. cylindracea

Binomial name
- Caulerpa cylindracea Sond.

Synonyms
- Caulerpa racemosa var. cylindracea (Sonder) Verlaque, Huisman & Boudouresque, 2003

= Caulerpa cylindracea =

Species of seaweed

Caulerpa cylindracea is a species of seaweed (green algae) in the Caulerpaceae family.

It is native to the Australian coast in a large area extending from around Perth north into the Mid West and Pilbara to the Kimberley region of Western Australia.

Caulerpa cylindracea was unintentionally introduced to the Mediterranean in the early 1990s, where it has spread extensively and is considered an invasive species. It is also considered invasive in South Australia where it can overgrow and out-compete native species.
