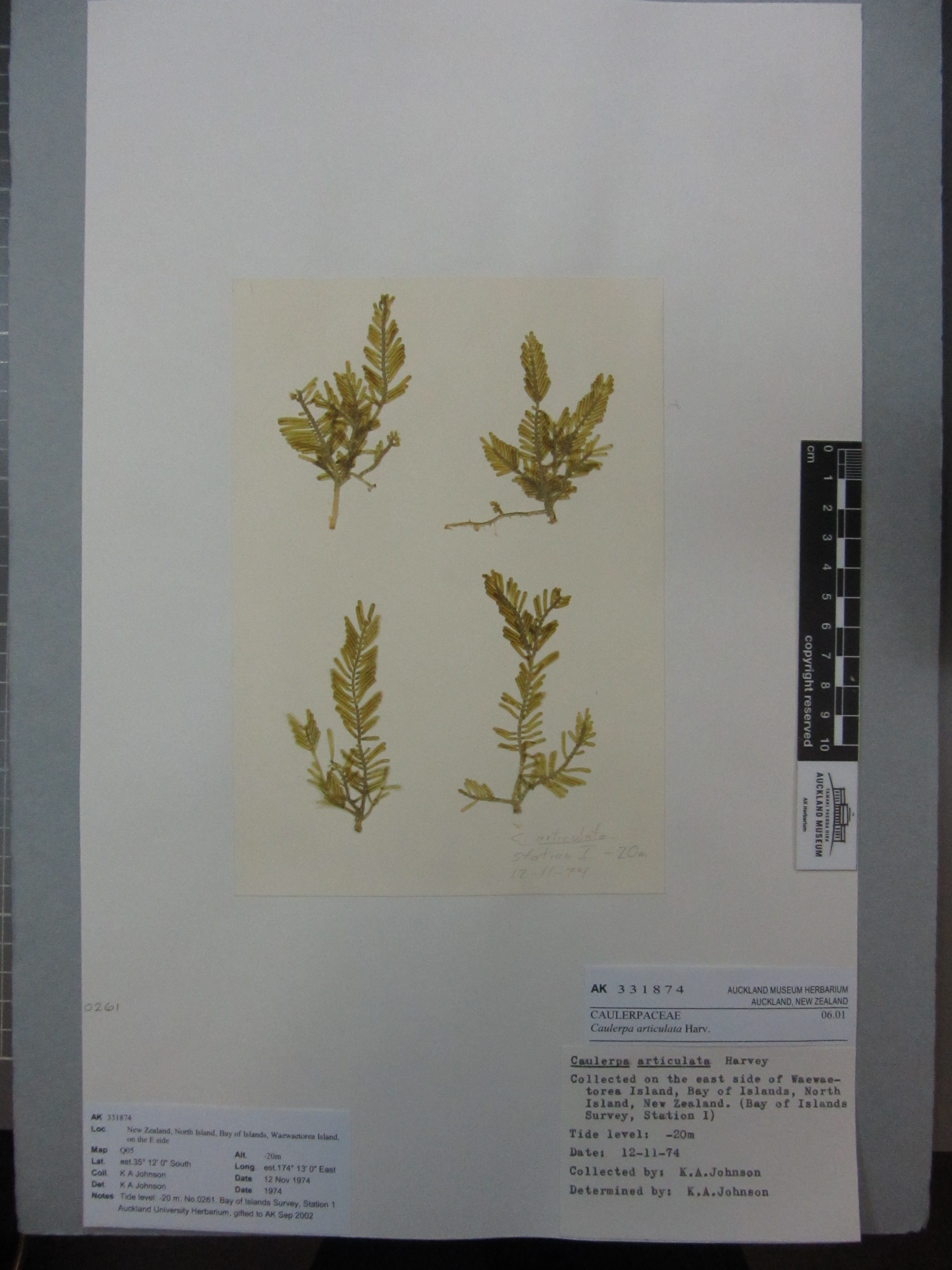

Scientific classification
- Kingdom: Plantae
- Division: Chlorophyta
- Class: Ulvophyceae
- Order: Bryopsidales
- Family: Caulerpaceae
- Genus: Caulerpa
- Species: C. articulata

Binomial name
- Caulerpa articulata Harv.

= Caulerpa articulata =

Species of alga

Caulerpa articulata is a species of seaweed in the Caulerpaceae family.

== Distribution ==
This species is found at Three Kings Island, the North Island, and the northern parts of the South Island of New Zealand. It is also found in Western Australia.
