= Caulerpa macrodisca =

Scientific classification
- Kingdom: Plantae
- Division: Chlorophyta
- Class: Ulvophyceae
- Order: Bryopsidales
- Family: Caulerpaceae
- Genus: Caulerpa
- Species: C. macrodisca

Binomial name
- Caulerpa macrodisca Decne.

Species of seaweed

Caulerpa macrodisca is a species of seaweed in the Caulerpaceae family.

The seaweed has a clumpy thallus that spreads to a width of around 12 centimetres (4.7 in), and is a medium to dark green colour.

The species is found in the subtidal areas tropical and subtropical waters in the western Pacific and Easter Indian oceans. In Western Australia, it is found along the coast in the Kimberley and south as far as the Mid West region.
