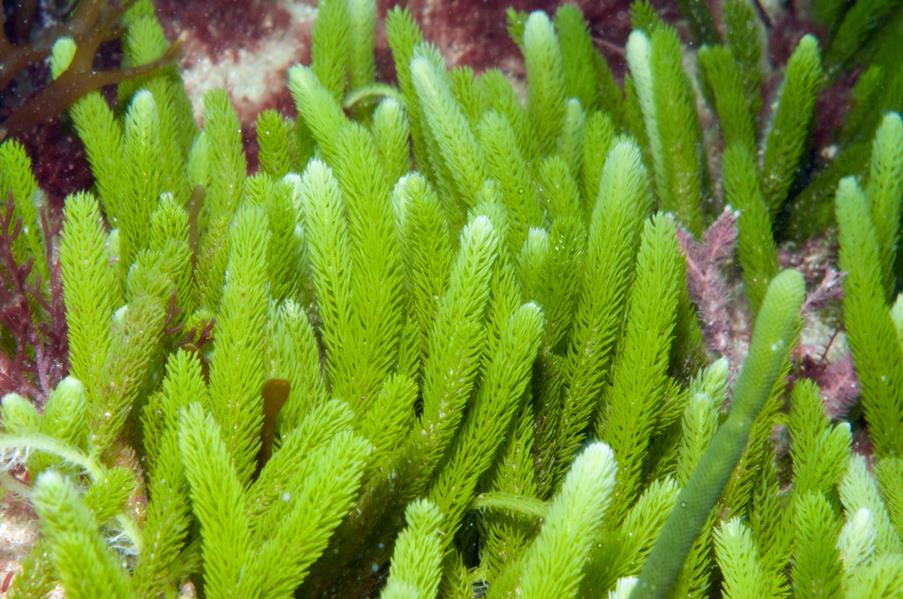

Scientific classification
- Kingdom: Plantae
- Division: Chlorophyta
- Class: Ulvophyceae
- Order: Bryopsidales
- Family: Caulerpaceae
- Genus: Caulerpa
- Species: C. brownii

Binomial name
- Caulerpa brownii (C.Agardh) Endl.

= Caulerpa brownii =

Species of seaweed

Caulerpa brownii is a species of seaweed in the Caulerpaceae family. It was first described in 1843. It is native to Australia and New Zealand.

== Taxonomy ==
This species was first described by Stephan Endlicher in 1843. Carl Adolph Agardh originally discussed this species under the name Caulerpa selago var. brownii in 1823.

== Distribution ==
This species can be found along the southern North Island, the South Island, Chatham Island, Stewart Island, Snares Island of New Zealand. It is also found along the coast in a large area extending from near Karratha in the northern Pilbara region to east of Esperance in the Goldfields-Esperance region of Western Australia.
