= Caulerpa heterophylla =

Scientific classification
- Kingdom: Plantae
- Division: Chlorophyta
- Class: Ulvophyceae
- Order: Bryopsidales
- Family: Caulerpaceae
- Genus: Caulerpa
- Species: C. heterophylla

Binomial name
- Caulerpa heterophylla Price, Huisman & Borow.

Species of seaweed

Caulerpa heterophylla is a species of seaweed in the Caulerpaceae family.

The seaweed is found in two places along the coast one from around Perth and the other near Albany in Western Australia.
