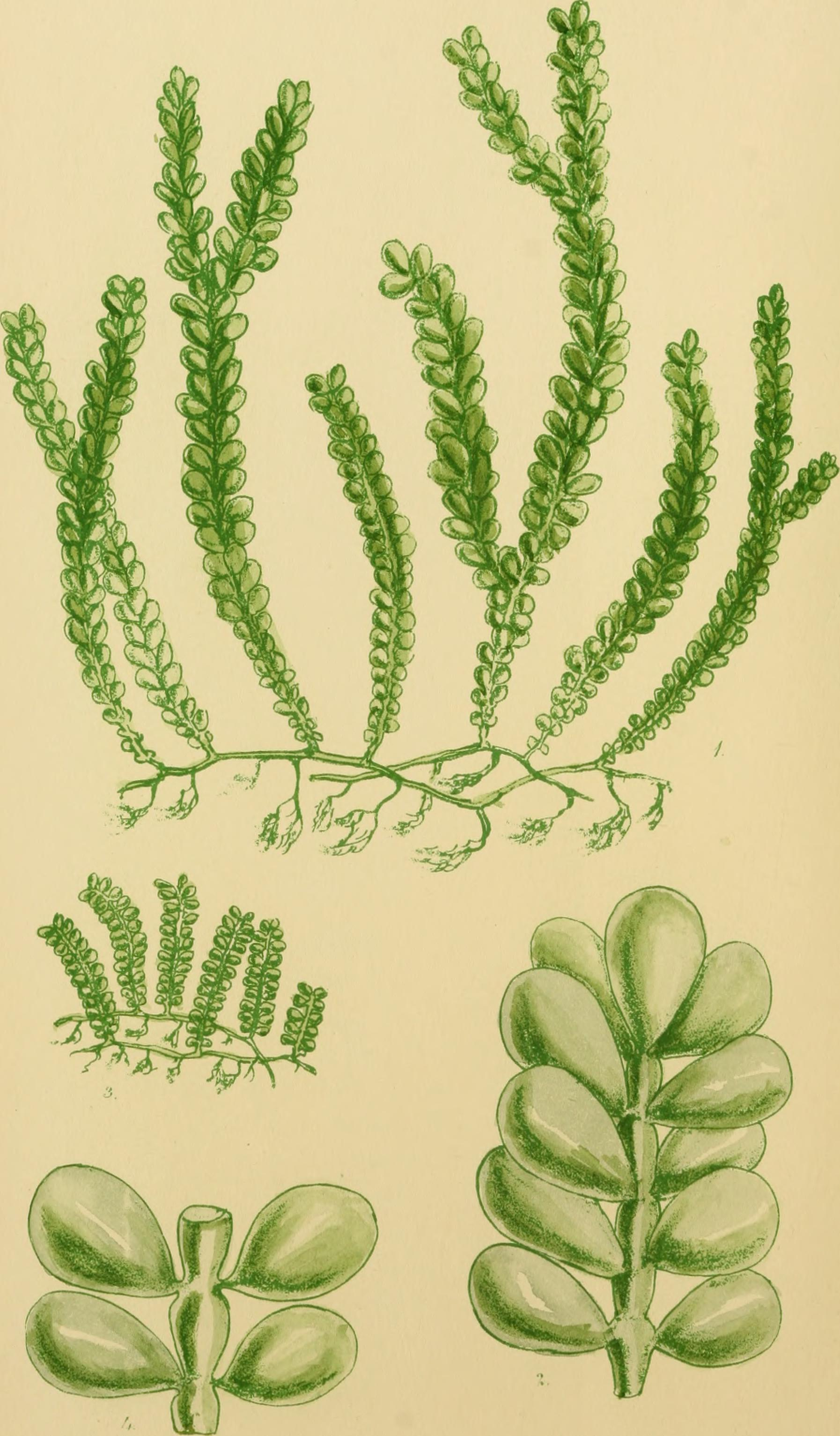
- 1. Caulerpa sedoides, natural size 2. Small portion, magnified 3. C. sedoides var. geminata, natural size 4. Small portion, magnified

Scientific classification
- Clade: Viridiplantae
- Division: Chlorophyta
- Class: Ulvophyceae
- Order: Bryopsidales
- Family: Caulerpaceae
- Genus: Caulerpa
- Species: C. sedoides

Binomial name
- Caulerpa sedoides C.Agardh

= Caulerpa sedoides =

Species of alga

Caulerpa sedoides, also known as mini-grapes or bubble caulerpa, is a species of seaweed in the Caulerpaceae family native to Australia.

== Description ==
The light to medium green delicate alga or seaweed with a thallus that grows to a size of around 15 centimetres (6 in). It has small elongated ovoid shaped beads arranged loosely along the main stolon or axis. The stolon is often branched and arises from rhizomes or running stolons) that are usually fixed to rocky surfaces in a marine environment.

== Taxonomy ==
The species was first formally described by the botanist Carl Adolph Agardh in 1817 as part of the work Synopsis algarum Scandinaviae, adjecta dispositione universali algarum. It was once known as Caulerpa germinata.

== Distribution ==
It is found mostly in the waters of southern Australia with its range extending from southern Queensland, Victoria, Tasmania and the coast of South Australia. In Western Australia, this species is found along the coast in the Mid West region and along much of the southern coastline to east of Esperance. C. sedoides is also found in waters around New Zealand, some Pacific Islands and South Korea. The seaweed with the intertwined runners and is often found in rock pools around the low tide level in rough water areas up to a depth of 25 metres (82 ft).
