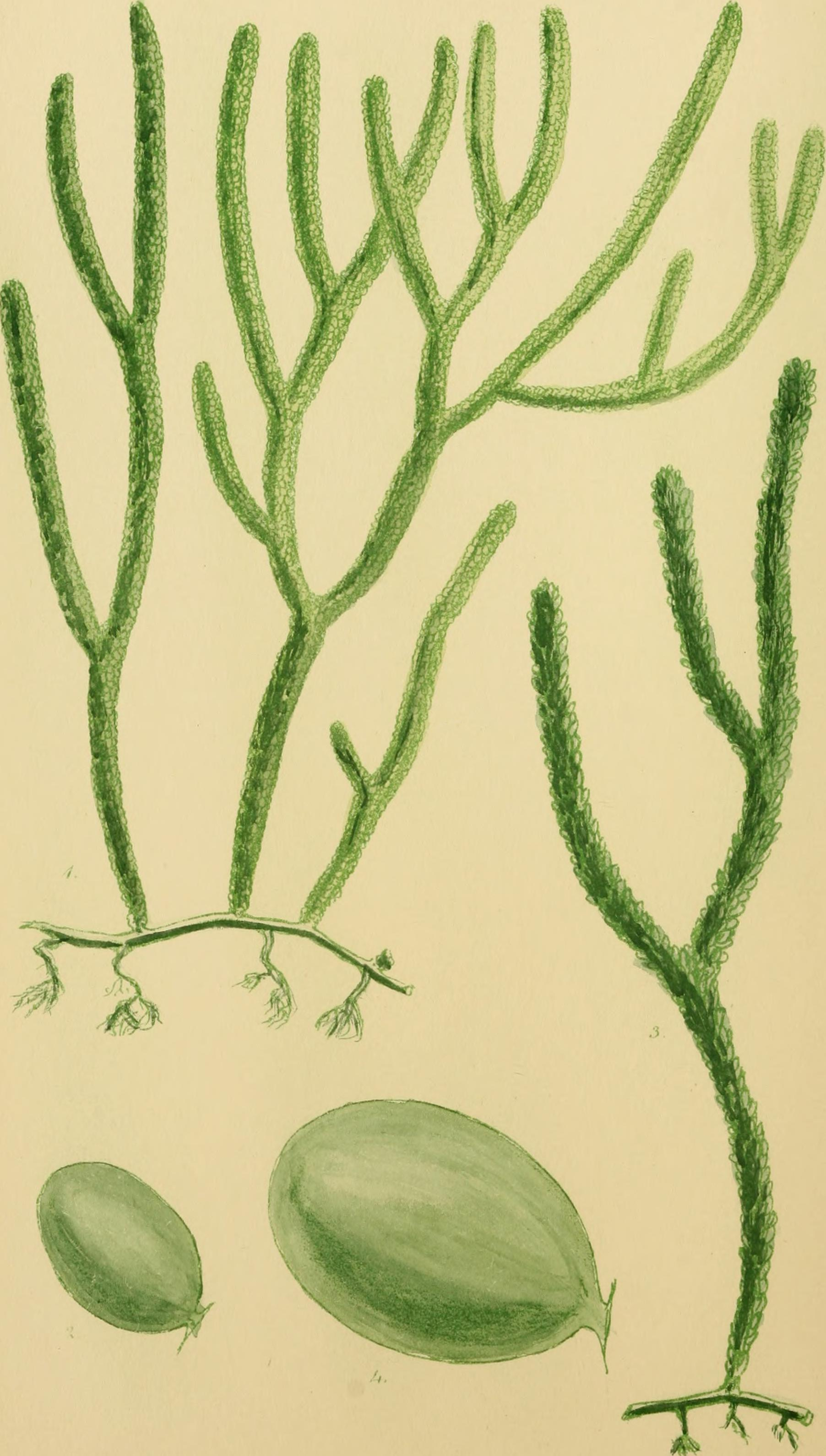
- Illustration of Caulerpa simpliciuscula

Scientific classification
- Clade: Viridiplantae
- Division: Chlorophyta
- Class: Ulvophyceae
- Order: Bryopsidales
- Family: Caulerpaceae
- Genus: Caulerpa
- Species: C. simpliciuscula

Binomial name
- Caulerpa simpliciuscula C.Agardh

= Caulerpa simpliciuscula =

Species of seaweed

Caulerpa simpliciuscula is a species of seaweed in the Caulerpaceae family.

The seaweed has a slender stolon and medium to dark green fronds that typically grow to 4 to 30 centimetres (1.6 to 11.8 in) in height with a width of 3 to 5 millimetres (0.12 to 0.20 in).

The species is found in rock pools and the upper sublittoral zones in rough seas. In Western Australia, it is found along the coast in the Mid West region extending south to the South West. It is also found in South Australia Victoria and Tasmania.
