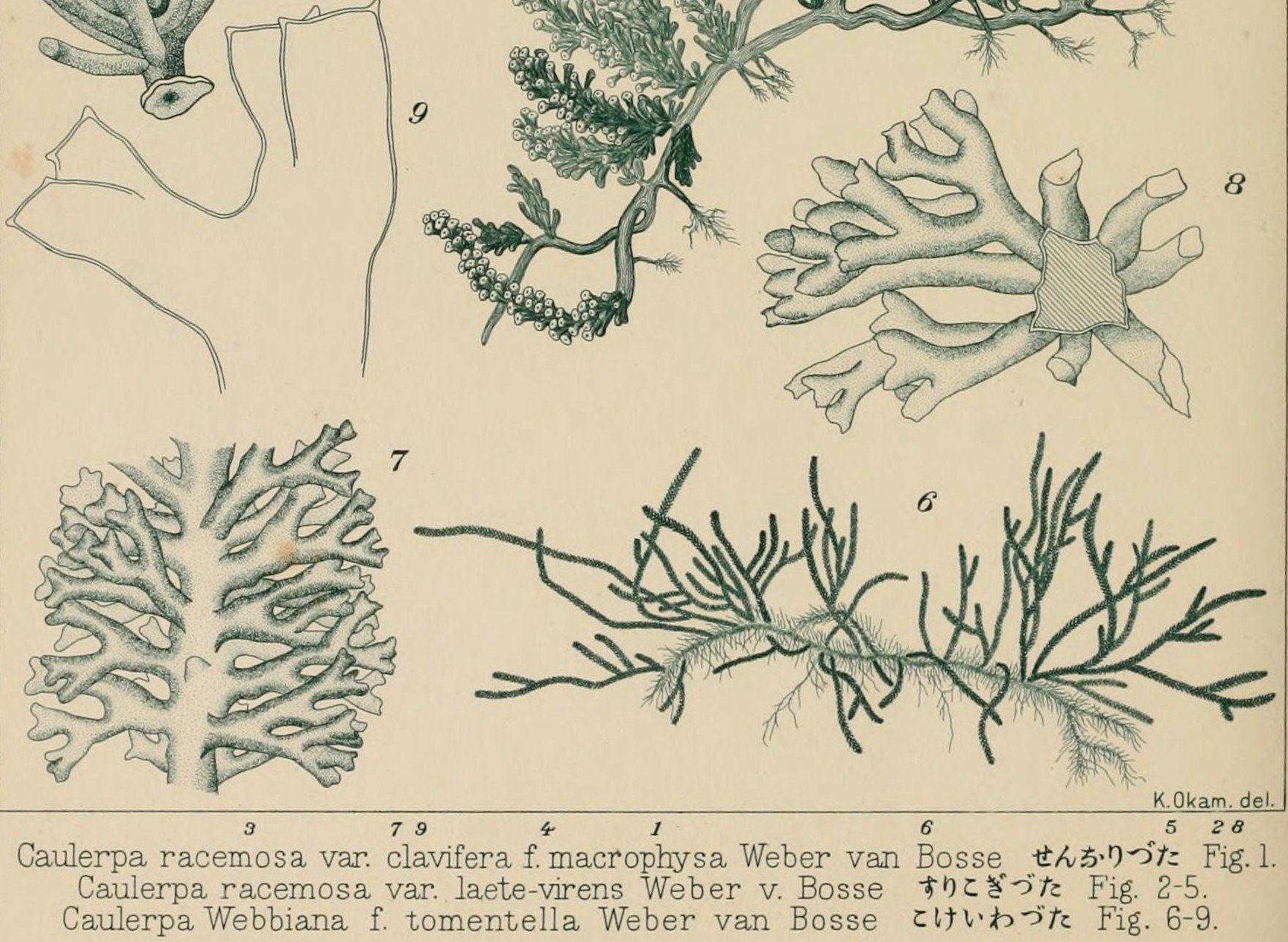
- Caulerpa webbiana f. tomentella

Scientific classification
- Clade: Viridiplantae
- Division: Chlorophyta
- Class: Ulvophyceae
- Order: Bryopsidales
- Family: Caulerpaceae
- Genus: Caulerpa
- Species: C. webbiana

Binomial name
- Caulerpa webbiana Mont.

= Caulerpa webbiana =

Bottlebrush green seaweed

Species of seaweed

Caulerpa webbiana, commonly known as bottlebrush green seaweed, is a species of seaweed in the family Caulerpaceae.

The seaweed has an olive green to bright green thallus that spreads outward to around 12 to 20 centimetres (4.7 to 7.9 in) forming dense clumps on coral rubble among seagrasses. The stems are about 4 to 6 centimetres (1.6 to 2.4 in) in length and have small bristles composed of many fine branched filaments, that are arranged in whorls around the stolon in the middle so that it resembles a stiff bottlebrush.

The species was first formally described in 1837 by the botanist Camille Montagne as part of the work Centurie de plantes cellulaires exotiques nouvelles as published in Annales des Sciences Naturelles, Botanique, Seconde série. The only known synonym is Chauvinia webbiana as described by Friedrich Traugott Kützing in 1849. The type specimen was collected from around Lanzarote in the Canary Islands.

The species is found in warmer waters in sediment or in coral reefs. It is found around the Canary Islands, islands in the Caribbean and Hawaii. It is also found is parts of Asia including Singapore. In Western Australia, it is found along the coast in the Kimberley region extending south to the Houtman Abrolhos.
