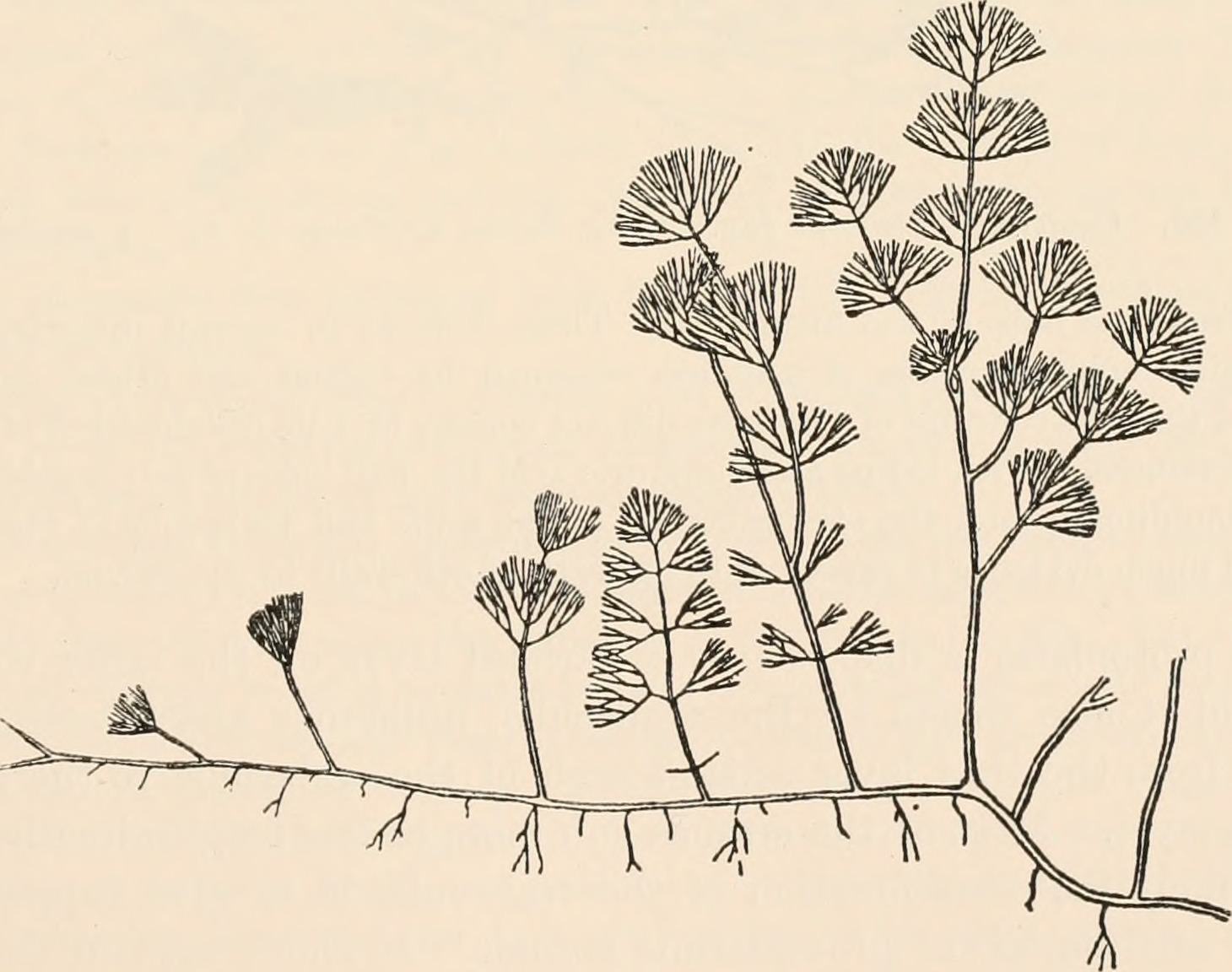
- Illustration by George Stephen West after Frederik Børgesen

Scientific classification
- Clade: Viridiplantae
- Division: Chlorophyta
- Class: Ulvophyceae
- Order: Bryopsidales
- Family: Caulerpaceae
- Genus: Caulerpa
- Species: C. verticillata

Binomial name
- Caulerpa verticillata J.Agardh

= Caulerpa verticillata =

Species of seaweed

Caulerpa verticillata is a species of seaweed in the Caulerpaceae family.

The seaweed has a green thallus that spreads outward to around 10 centimetres (3.9 in) forming dense low mats.

The species is found in warmer waters of the Indian and Pacific Oceans particularly in the Caribbean. In Western Australia, it is found along the coast in the Kimberley region extending south to the Pilbara.
