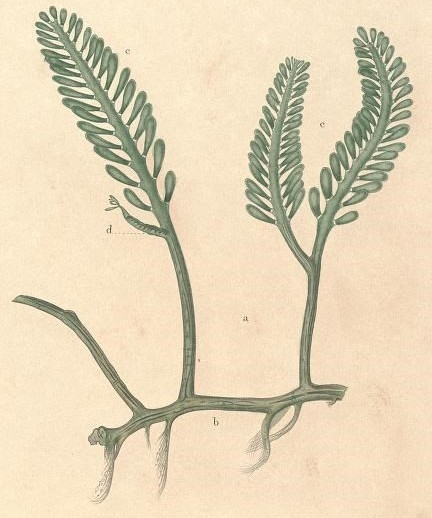
- illustration of Caulerpa corynephora

Scientific classification
- Clade: Viridiplantae
- Division: Chlorophyta
- Class: Ulvophyceae
- Order: Bryopsidales
- Family: Caulerpaceae
- Genus: Caulerpa
- Species: C. corynephora

Binomial name
- Caulerpa corynephora Mont.

= Caulerpa corynephora =

Species of seaweed

Caulerpa corynephora is a species of seaweed in the Caulerpaceae family.

It is found along the coast in a large area extending from around the Abrolhos Islands in the Mid West region to the Kimberley region of Western Australia.
