= Caulerpa lagara =

Scientific classification
- Kingdom: Plantae
- Division: Chlorophyta
- Class: Ulvophyceae
- Order: Bryopsidales
- Family: Caulerpaceae
- Genus: Caulerpa
- Species: C. lagara

Binomial name
- Caulerpa lagara Carruth., D.I.Walker & Huisman

Species of seaweed

Caulerpa lagara is a species of seaweed in the Caulerpaceae family.

The seaweed is found around Perth in Western Australia.
