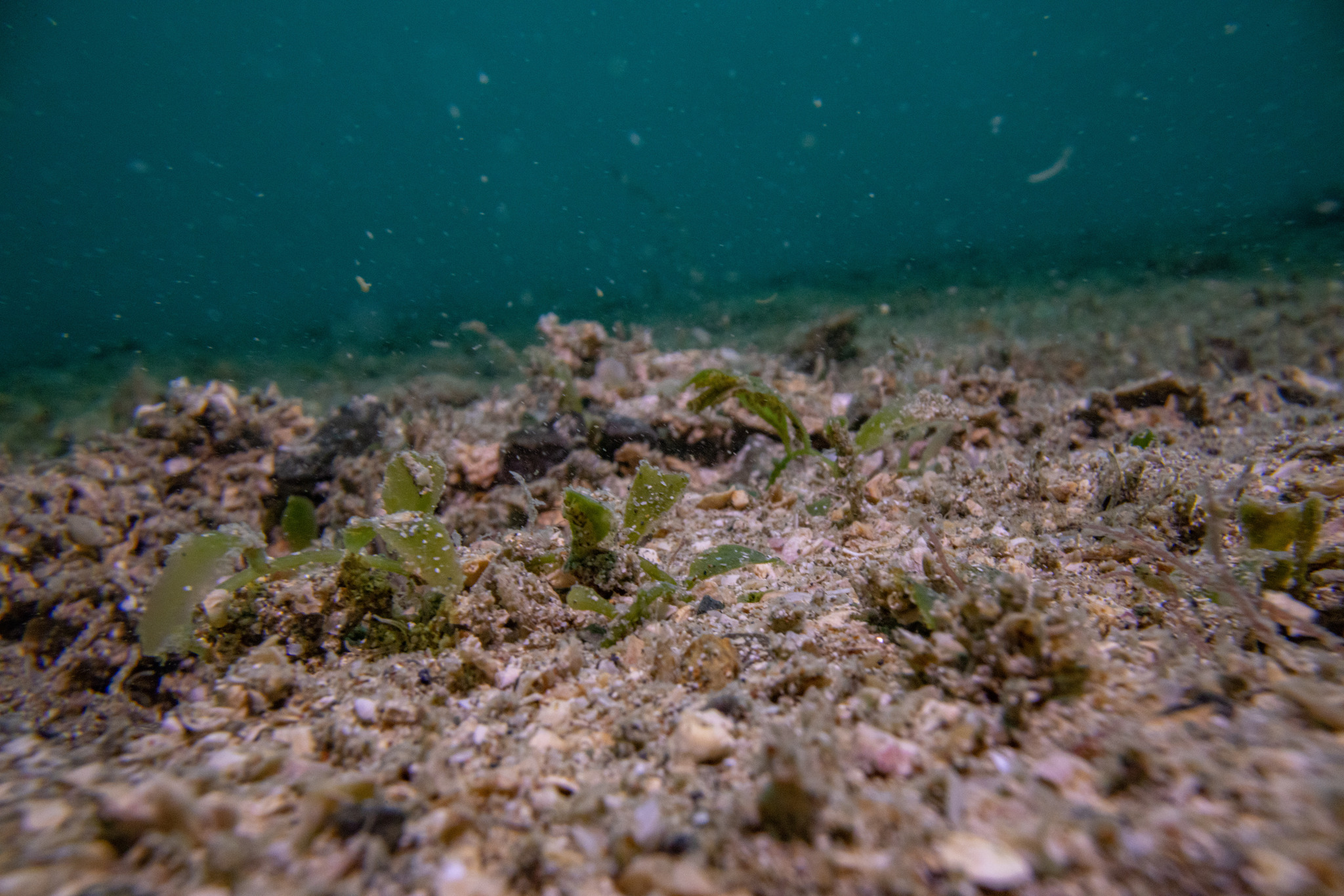

Scientific classification
- Domain: Eukaryota
- Supergroup: Archaeplastida
- Clade: Viridiplantae
- Division: Chlorophyta
- Class: Ulvophyceae
- Order: Bryopsidales
- Family: Caulerpaceae
- Genus: Caulerpa
- Species: C. parvifolia

Binomial name
- Caulerpa parvifolia Harv.

= Caulerpa parvifolia =

Species of seaweed

Caulerpa parvifolia is a species of seaweed in the Caulerpaceae family.

== Description ==
The seaweed has a thallus that is grass-green to olive green in colour and spreads outward to 10 to 20 centimetres (3.9 to 7.9 in).

== Distribution ==
In Western Australia, it is found along the coast in the Pilbara and as far south as Cape Naturaliste in the South West region it is also found in the Pacific and Indian Oceans.

In New Zealand, C. parvifolia and C. brachypus were first reported at Great Barrier Island in July 2021 via an iNaturalist observation. As of 2026, these exotic caulerpa species have been detected across multiple locations across the Hauraki Gulf, the Coromandel and Northland, including locations such as Great Mercury Island and the Goat Island Marine Reserve.

== Ecology ==
The species is found on sand and rock in the subtidal region in tropical and warmer seas.
