= C. dichotoma =

C. dichotoma may refer to:

- Callicarpa dichotoma, the purple beautyberry or early amethyst, a plant species
- Caulerpa dichotoma, a green alga species
- Ceropegia dichotoma, the cardoncillo, a flowering plant species endemic to the Canary Islands
- Clidemia dichotoma, a plant species in the genus Clidemia
- Cordia dichotoma, the fragrant manjack or the bird lime tree, a plant species

== See also ==
- Dichotoma
