= Caulerpa cliftonii =

Scientific classification
- Clade: Viridiplantae
- Division: Chlorophyta
- Class: Ulvophyceae
- Order: Bryopsidales
- Family: Caulerpaceae
- Genus: Caulerpa
- Species: C. cliftonii

Binomial name
- Caulerpa cliftonii Harv.

Species of seaweed

Caulerpa cliftonii is a species of seaweed in the Caulerpaceae family.

It is found along the coast in a small area around Geraldton in the Mid West region of Western Australia, including the Abrolhos Islands.
