= Caulerpa dichotoma =

Scientific classification
- Clade: Viridiplantae
- Division: Chlorophyta
- Class: Ulvophyceae
- Order: Bryopsidales
- Family: Caulerpaceae
- Genus: Caulerpa
- Species: C. dichotoma

Binomial name
- Caulerpa dichotoma Sved.

Species of seaweed

Caulerpa dichotoma is a species of seaweed in the Caulerpaceae family.

The seaweed is grass green at the base becoming a darker green. The thallus spreads outward to about 20 centimetres (7.9 in) and has stolons that are approximately 4 millimetres (0.16 in) in diameter.

It is found along the coast in a small area of the Kimberley region of Western Australia.
