= Caulerpella =

Scientific classification
- Kingdom: Plantae
- Division: Chlorophyta
- Class: Ulvophyceae
- Order: Bryopsidales
- Family: Caulerpaceae
- Genus: Caulerpella; Prudhomme van Reine & Lokhorst, 1992

Type species
- Caulerpella ambigua (Okamura) Prud'homme van Reine & Lokhorst, 1992

Species
- Caulerpella ambigua

Genus of algae

Caulerpella is a genus of green algae in the family Caulerpaceae.
