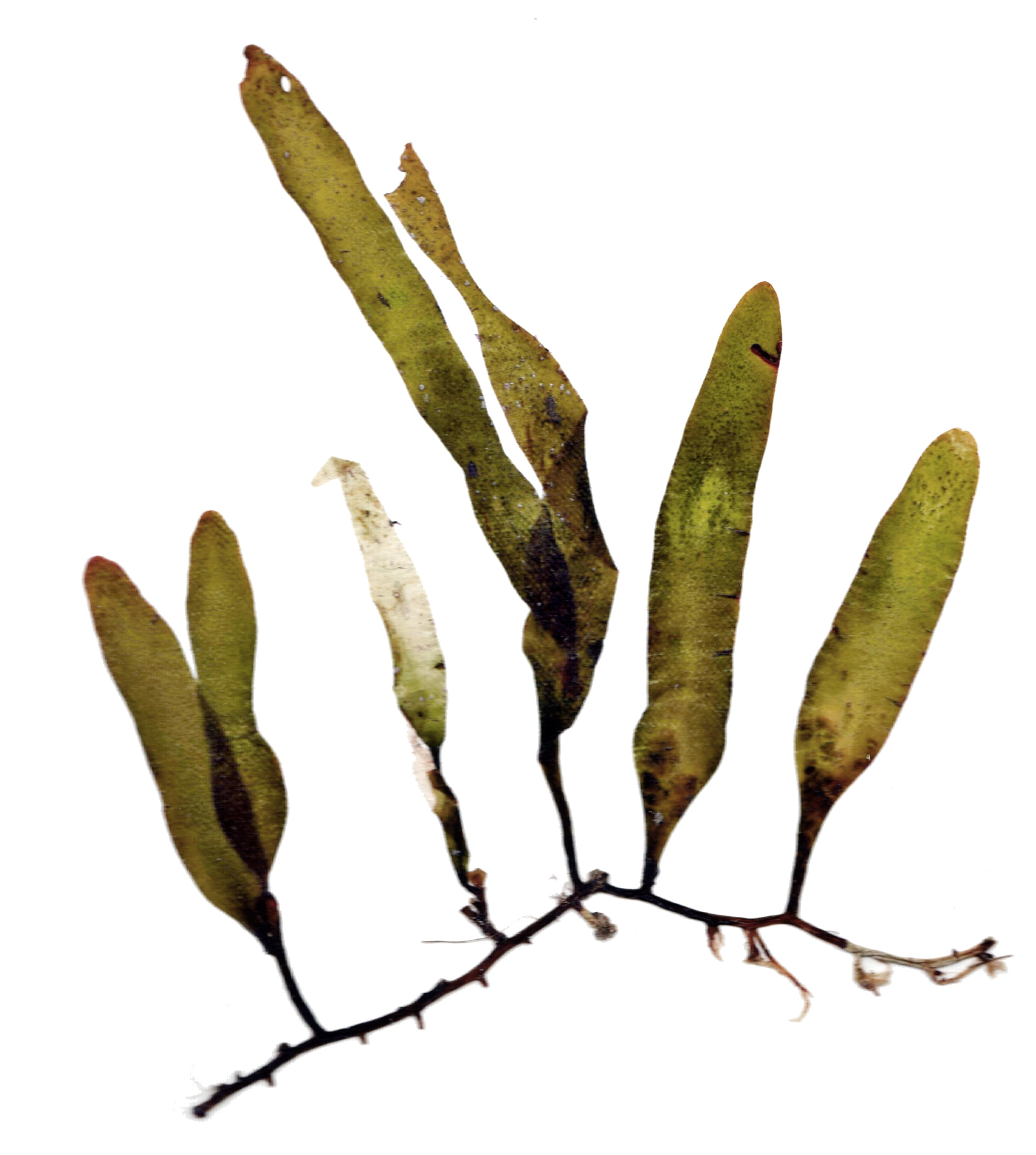
- Caulerpa prolifera

Scientific classification
- Domain: Eukaryota
- Supergroup: Archaeplastida
- Clade: Viridiplantae
- Division: Chlorophyta
- Class: Ulvophyceae
- Order: Bryopsidales
- Family: Caulerpaceae
- Genus: Caulerpa; J.V. Lamouroux, 1809

Type species
- Caulerpa prolifera (Forsskål) J.V. Lamouroux, 1809

Species
- About 101

= Caulerpa =

Genus of seaweeds

Caulerpa is a genus of seaweeds in the family Caulerpaceae (among the green algae). They are unusual because they consist of only one cell with many nuclei, also known as coenocytic or siphonous algae, making them among the biggest single cells in the world.

Referring to the crawling habit of its thallus, the name means 'stem (that) creeps', from the Ancient Greek kaulos (καυλός, 'stalk') and herpo (ἕρπω, 'to creep').

== Taxonomy and nomenclature ==
First described by Jean Vincent Lamouroux in 1809, Caulerpa is the only genus under the family Caulerpaceae, from the order Bryopsidales, class Ulvophyceae, and phylum Chlorophyta. Through the use of tufA gene sequencing, it was revealed that Pseudochlorodesmis F. Børgesen was a sister clade of Caulerpa. Cremen et al. proposed a new classification scheme in Bryopsidales, wherein Caulerpaceae and Halimedaceae were described as sister families.

Species discrimination via morphology-based identification is often hampered by the high degree of variation among traits. Thus, several species are often misidentified without the use of molecular analyses. As of 2019, there are 101 accepted species, with 40 varieties and 67 forms.

== Biology ==
Caulerpa species support their large cell size by having the cytoplasm circulate constantly, supported by a network of microtubules. This behavior was known in 1967.

The cytoplasm does not leak out when the cell is cut. Regeneration is directional, with rhizoids at the bottom and fronds at the top.

The genus produces a number of secondary metabolites thought to be related to its toxicity and peppery taste. These include the red pigment alkaloid caulerpin and its derivative caulerchlorin and the amine mixture caulerpicin.

== Morphology ==
=== External characteristics ===
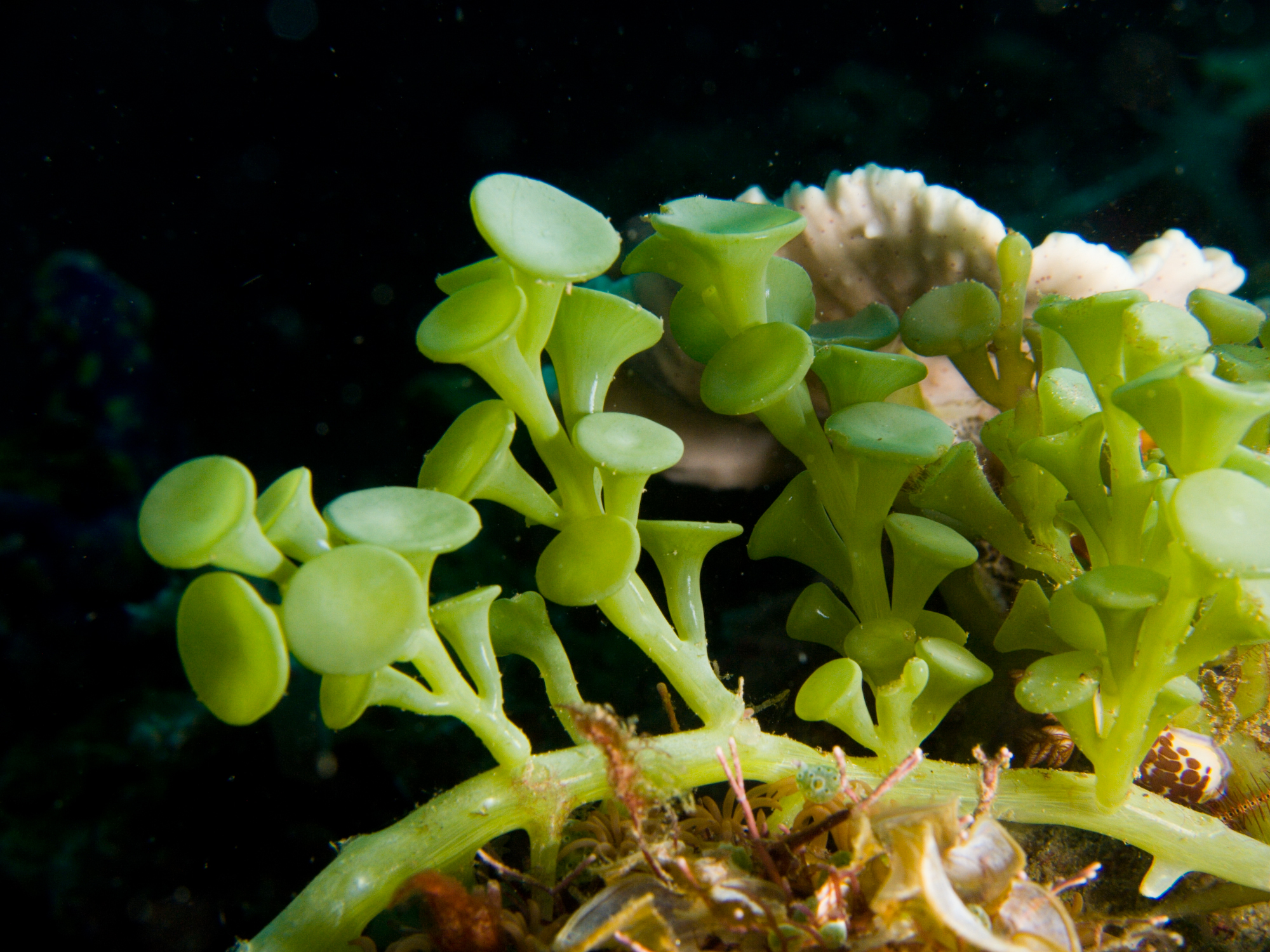
Caulerpa racemosa showing irregular turbinate ramuli (Hobgood, n.d.)

The genus Caulerpa exhibits several different growth forms. They possess a stolon with rhizoids which grow downward, anchoring the plant to the substrate. The stolons support upright fronds or leaves known as assimilators. The structure of the assimilator may be ligulate (leaf-like, e.g. Caulerpa prolifera), or they may have a central axis known as a rachis. The rachis may have lateral branchlets known as ramuli which themselves come in different forms (terete, turbinate, clavate, peltate, falcate, vesiculate) and arrangements: distichous - ramuli are arranged evenly opposite each other (e.g. Caulerpa taxifolia), irregular - vesiculate ramuli with no distinct arrangement (e.g. Caulerpa racemosa), verticillate - whorled ramuli (e.g. Caulerpa cuppresoides).

=== Internal anatomy ===
Caulerpa is coenocytic, meaning it has a multinucleate thallus organization. It is also siphonous, meaning unlike other algae, the thallus and the nuclei are not separated by cell walls. They are instead one long mass of protoplasm surrounded by a single cell wall. The genus also possesses trabeculae, which are inward growing cell wall extensions that pass through the central lumen of siphons. It is hypothesized that these provide the thallus with structural support, facilitate diffusion to the inner cytoplasm, and can possibly help in determining cell shape - which may contribute to the diversity of growth forms found in the genus.

== Distribution ==
Caulerpa is mostly found in tropical regions, however its distribution may also extend up to temperate locations. Diversity is highest in the Caribbean and the Indo-Malay region, as well as in southern Australia, where a majority of Caulerpa species are endemic.

== Ecology ==
The genus is typically found in shallow intertidal zones and can reach up to depths of 100 meters. They are known to be able to adapt and thrive in different environmental conditions, which contributes to their potential for becoming invasive species. Some of their traits include having a high tolerance for a wide range of temperatures, their capacity for asexual reproduction through rhizoid extension and fragmentation, their fast growth rate, as well as their capacity for nutrient intake from sediments through their rhizoids. This last trait gives them a competitive edge over other macroalgal species who mainly absorb nutrients from the water column.

== Life history ==
Many studies on the life cycle of Caulerpa have been found to contradict each other, leading researchers to conclude that it varies with species and geographical region. Earlier research revealed that Caulerpa has a diplontic life cycle with a diploid vegetative phase and haploid biflagellate gametes. However, it was later found that ploidy status and genome size can vary within and between species.

== Exploitation and cultivation ==
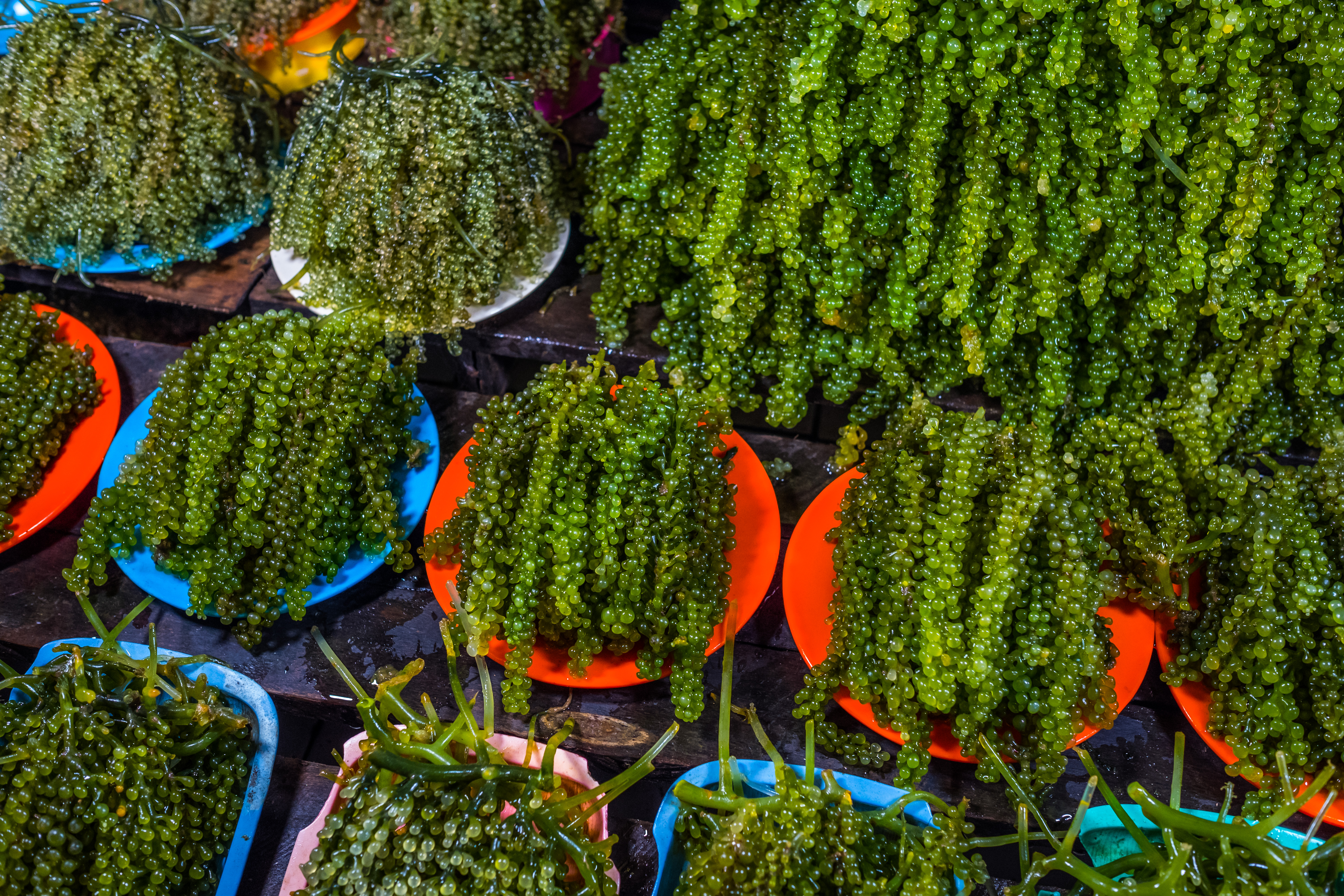
Edible fresh latô (Caulerpa lentillifera) sold at a fish market in the Philippines

Some species of Caulerpa are edible. The two most commonly eaten are Caulerpa lentillifera and Caulerpa racemosa, both called "sea grapes" in English. Both are traditionally harvested in the wild and sold in local markets in Southeast Asia, Oceania, and East Asia. They are eaten raw in salads and have a characteristic "sea" flavor and a crunchy texture.

Both species are cultivated in aquaculture. Their cultivation began in the 1950s in Cebu, Philippines, after accidental introduction of C. lentillifera to fish ponds. Cultivation of C. lentillifera continued in Japan in 1986, where it was cultivated in tanks in the tropical waters of Okinawa. Commercial cultivation has since spread to other countries, including Vietnam, Taiwan, and China (in Fujian and Hainan). Most are for domestic consumption, but they are also exported to Japan.

Cultivation of Caulerpa is convenient because they can propagate through fragmentation. There are several farming techniques being used to cultivate Caulerpa, which typically involve tying fragments to different types of infrastructure. Many Pacific countries such as Japan, Philippines, Vietnam, and Samoa use the off-bottom method, where the seaweeds are grown a few meters above the ground on cages or trays. The bottom-planting method is also used in the Philippines, and involves growing the Caulerpa on a substrate. Land-based raceways in hatchery-type facilities offer a more controlled environment for cultures, and have been used more in recent years.

== Chemical composition ==
Caulerpa contains a high amount of iron (up to 81.3 mg per 100 g of dry matter in C. racemosa), magnesium, and calcium. Water content is species-specific and generally ranges from 75 – 94%. The genus is known to have a high bioaccumulation rate, which can make it less than ideal to consume on a regular basis. Carbohydrate content can range from 3.6 - 83.2% of dry matter depending on the species. The main pigments of Caulerpa are chlorophyll a and b. It has a high diversity of chemical compounds which have pharmaceutical potential. Although the genus is known to exhibit high toxicity, it was found to be of low risk to humans.

== Utilization ==
Aside from being a source of food, Caulerpa has several uses from bioremediation, to fertilizer, and health and wellness. The anti-oxidant compounds of Caulerpa have been well-studied, and these are used in treating various diseases and health conditions such as cancer and cardiovascular disorders. Caulerpa has been shown to be effective in filtering water used in culturing fish, mollusks, and shrimp (in particular C. lentillifera). The use of Caulerpa as a biofertilizer has also been studied particularly in India, where fertilizers composed of 25% Caulerpa extracts enhanced the growth and reduced the total sugar content, among other things, of Vigna mungo.

== Invasive behaviour ==
Another species, Caulerpa taxifolia, has become an invasive species in the Mediterranean Sea, Australia and southern California (where it has since been eradicated). In U.S. waters, the Mediterranean strain of Caulerpa taxifolia is listed as a federal noxious weed, under the Plant Protection Act. The Aquatic Nuisance Species Taskforce has also created a National Management Plan for the Genus Caulerpa. The state of California also prohibits possession of nine different species of Caulerpa.

It is thought that Caulerpa species have such invasive properties in these regions due to their capability to thrive in temperate waters, along with their freedom from natural predators. Most Caulerpa species evolved in tropical waters, where herbivores have immunity to toxic compounds (mainly caulerpicin) within the alga. Temperate water herbivores have no natural immunity to these toxins, allowing Caulerpa to grow unchecked if introduced to temperate waters.

C. racemosa has recently been found in waters around Crete, where it is thought to have contributed to a significant reduction in fisheries. The alga has invaded the area from the warmer waters of the Red Sea.

C. cylindracea, which is native to Australia, has also become an invasive species in the Mediterranean.

In New Zealand, invasive exotic caulerpa species, C. brachypus and C. parvifolia, were first reported at Great Barrier Island in July 2021 via an iNaturalist observation. As of 2026, these exotic caulerpa species have been detected across multiple locations across the Hauraki Gulf, the Coromandel and Northland, including locations such as Great Mercury Island and the Goat Island Marine Reserve.

== Use in aquariums ==
Caulerpa is common in the aquarium hobby as a nitrate absorber because of its rapid growth under relatively adverse conditions. It may also be used in refugiums for a long-term nitrite absorber. Many introductions of invasive Caulerpa to the wild are thought to have occurred via aquarium dumping although there is no proof that this is so. For this reason, some aquarium hobbyists have begun using Chaetomorpha or an algae scrubber instead.

== Species ==
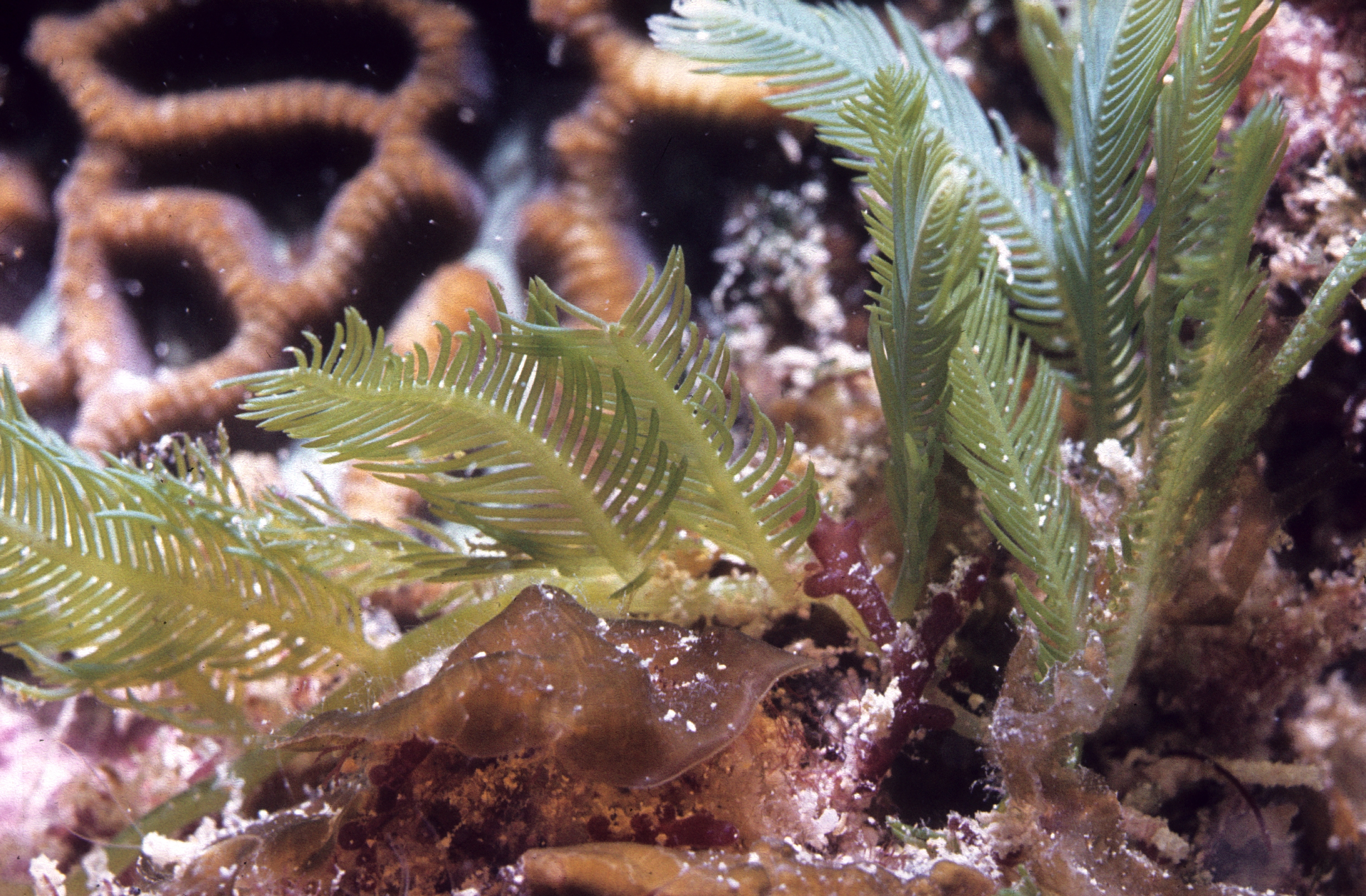
Feather algae, Caulerpa sertularioides at 11 metres' depth on ridge

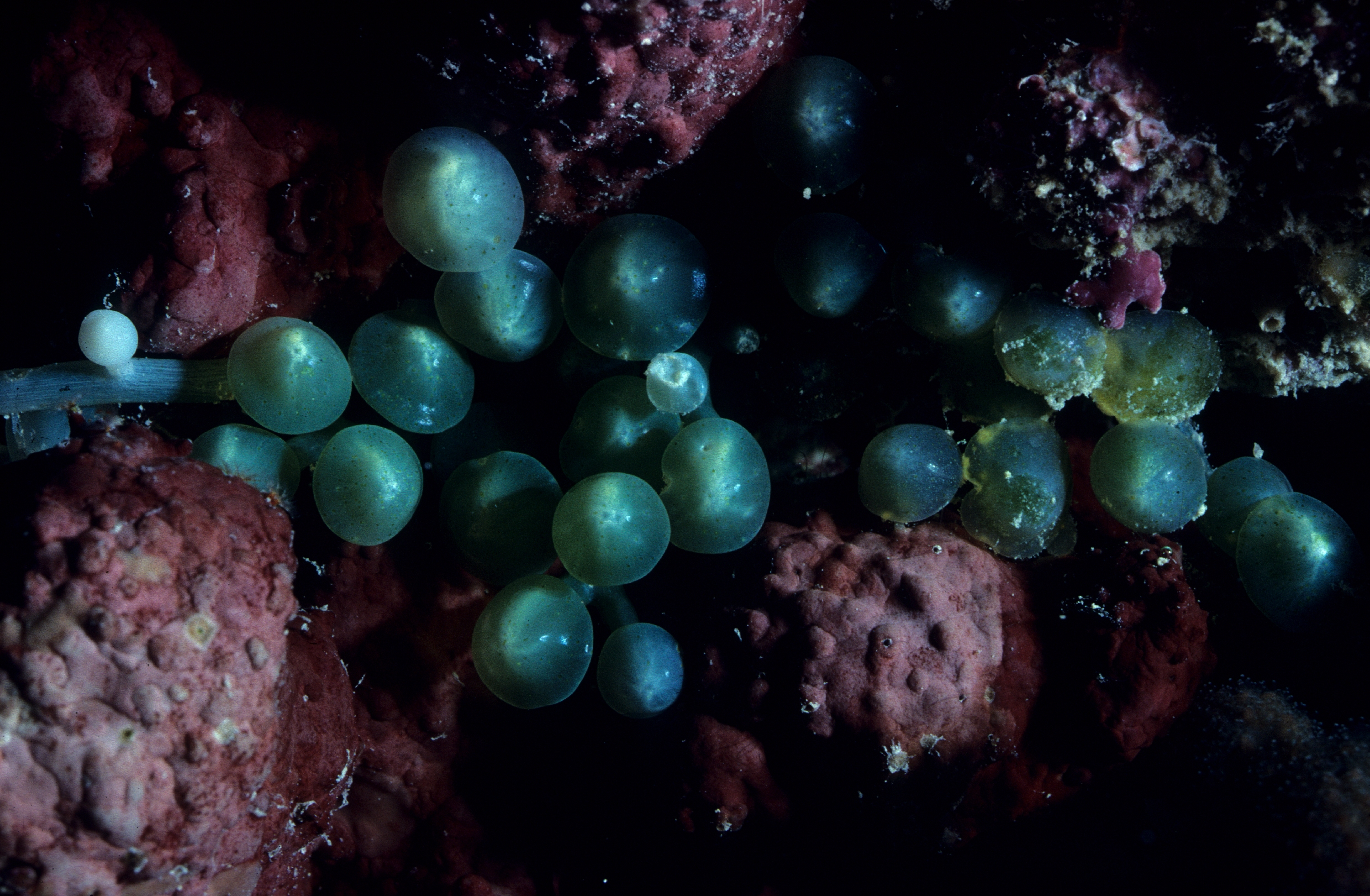
Oval sea grapes, Caulerpa racemosa var. clavifera, at 5 metres' depth

The following species are currently recognized in the genus Caulerpa:

- Caulerpa agardhii Weber-van Bosse, 1898
- Caulerpa alternans Womersley, 1956
- Caulerpa ambigua Okamura, 1897
- Caulerpa andamanensis (W.R.Taylor) Draisma, Prudhomme & Sauvage, 2014
- Caulerpa antoensis Yamada, 1940
- Caulerpa articulata Harvey, 1855
- Caulerpa ashmeadii Harvey, 1858
- Caulerpa bartoniae G.Murray, 1896
- Caulerpa bikinensis W.R.Taylor, 1950
- Caulerpa biserrulata Sonder, 1871
- Caulerpa brachypus Harvey, 1860
- Caulerpa brownii (C.Agardh) Endlicher, 1843
- Caulerpa buginensis E.Verheij & Prud'homme van Reine, 1993
- Caulerpa cactoides (Turner) C.Agardh, 1817
- Caulerpa chamnitzia
- Caulerpa chemnitzia (Esper) J.V.Lamouroux, 1809
- Caulerpa cliftonii Harvey, 1863
- Caulerpa constricta I.R.Price, J.M.Huisman & M.A.Borowitzka, 1998
- Caulerpa coppejansii G.Belton & Prud'homme, 2019
- Caulerpa corynephora Montagne, 1842
- Caulerpa crispata (Harvey) G.Belton & Gurgel, 2019
- Caulerpa cupressoides (Vahl) C.Agardh, 1817
- Caulerpa cylindracea Sonder, 1845
- Caulerpa denticulata Decaisne, 1841
- Caulerpa dichotoma Svedelius, 1906
- Caulerpa diligulata Kraft & A.J.K.Millar, 2000
- Caulerpa ellistoniae Womersley, 1955
- Caulerpa elongata Weber Bosse, 1898
- Caulerpa falcifolia Harvey & Bailey, 1851
- Caulerpa faridii Nizamuddin, 1964
- Caulerpa fastigiata Montagne, 1837
- Caulerpa fergusonii G.Murray, 1891
- Caulerpa filicoides Yamada, 1936
- Caulerpa filiformis (Suhr) Hering, 1841
- Caulerpa flagelliformis
- Caulerpa flexilis J.V.Lamouroux ex C.Agardh, 1823
- Caulerpa floridana W.R.Taylor, 1960
- Caulerpa freycinettii
- Caulerpa geminata Harvey, 1855
- Caulerpa gracilis (Zan.) Web. V. B.
- Caulerpa hedleyi Weber-van Bosse, 1910
- Caulerpa heterophylla I.R.Price, J.M.Huisman & M.A.Borowitzka, 1998
- Caulerpa hodgkinsoniae J.Agardh, 1887
- Caulerpa holmesiana G.Murray, 1891
- Caulerpa integerrima (Zanardini) M.J.Wynne, Verbruggen & D.L.Angel, 2009
- Caulerpa juniperoides J.Agardh, 1873
- Caulerpa kempfii A.B.Joly & S.M.B.Pereira, 1975
- Caulerpa laetivirens
- Caulerpa lagara Carruthers, Walker & Huisman, 1993
- Caulerpa lamourouxii (Turner) C.Agardh, 1817
- Caulerpa lanuginosa J.Agardh, 1873
- Caulerpa lentillifera J.Agardh, 1837
- Caulerpa lessonii Bory de Saint-Vincent, 1828
- Caulerpa longifolia C.Agardh, 1823
- Caulerpa lucasii Prud'homme, Draisma & G.Belton, 2019
- Caulerpa macra (Weber-van Bosse) Draisma & Prud'homme, 2014
- Caulerpa macrodisca Decaisne, 1842
- Caulerpa manorensis Nizamuddin, 1964
- Caulerpa matsueana Yamada, 1940
- Caulerpa megadisca G.S.Belton & C.F.D.Gurgel, 2014
- Caulerpa mexicana Sonder ex Kützing, 1849
- Caulerpa microphysa (Weber Bosse) Feldmann, 1955
- Caulerpa muelleri Sonder, 1853
- Caulerpa murrayi Weber Bosse, 1898
- Caulerpa nummularia Harvey ex J.Agardh, 1873
- Caulerpa obscura Sonder, 1845
- Caulerpa occidentalis (J. Ag.) Boergs.
- Caulerpa okamurae Weber Bosse, 1897
- Caulerpa oligophylla Montagne, 1842
- Caulerpa ollivieri Dostál, 1929
- Caulerpa opposita Coppejans & Meinesz, 1988
- Caulerpa papillosa J.Agardh, 1873
- Caulerpa parvifolia Harvey, 1860
- Caulerpa parvula Svedelius, 1906
- Caulerpa paspaloides (Bory de Saint-Vincent) Greville, 1830
- Caulerpa pennata J.Agardh, 1873
- Caulerpa pinnata C.Agardh, 1817
- Caulerpa plumulifera Zanardini, 1878
- Caulerpa prolifera (Forsskål) J.V.Lamouroux, 1809
- Caulerpa pusilla (Kützing) J.Agardh, 1873
- Caulerpa qureshii Nizamuddin, 1964
- Caulerpa racemosa (Forsskål) J.Agardh, 1873
- Caulerpa remotifolia Sonder, 1853
- Caulerpa reniformis G.R.South & Skelton, 2003
- Caulerpa reyesii Meñez & Calumpong, 1982
- Caulerpa scalpelliformis (R.Brown ex Turner) C.Agardh, 1817
- Caulerpa sedoides C.Agardh, 1817
- Caulerpa selago (Turner) C.Agardh, 1817
- Caulerpa serrulata (Forsskål) J.Agardh, 1837
- Caulerpa sertularioides (S.G.Gmelin) M.Howe, 1905
- Caulerpa seuratii Weber-van Bosse, 1910
- Caulerpa simpliciuscula (R.Brown ex Turner) C.Agardh, 1823
- Caulerpa spathulata Womersley & A.Bailey, 1970
- Caulerpa subserrata Okamura, 1897
- Caulerpa taxifolia (M.Vahl) C.Agardh, 1817
- Caulerpa tongaensis Papenfuss, 1943
- Caulerpa trifaria Harvey, 1863
- Caulerpa turbinata (J. Ag.) Eubank
- Caulerpa urvilleana Montagne, 1845
- Caulerpa veravalensis Thivy & V.D.Chauhan, 1963
- Caulerpa verticillata J.Agardh, 1847
- Caulerpa vesiculifera (Harvey) Harvey, 1863
- Caulerpa vickersiae Børgesen, 1911
- Caulerpa vieillardii Kützing, 1863
- Caulerpa vitifolia (Bonpland) J.V.Lamouroux
- Caulerpa webbiana Montagne, 1837
- Caulerpa wysorii T.Sauvage & M.J.Wynne, 2021
- Caulerpa zeyheri Kützing, 1857

== See also ==
- Valonia ventricosa, another large coenocytic organism
- Naso tuberosus
