= Kintarô Okamura =

Japanese botanist

Kintaro Okamura (岡村 金太郎, Okamura Kintarō; May 5, 1867 – August 21, 1935) was a Japanese botanist and educationalist.

Okamura was the author of important studies about seaweeds. He was also known for his educational books collection, the Ohraimono.

Okamura was the editor of two exsiccatae, namely An Album of Japanese Bryophyta and Algae Japonicae exsiccatae.

== Bibliography ==
- Nihon kaisō zusetsu (in Japanese). Kintarō Okamura. 1900. OCLC 83442798.
- Illustrations of the Marine Algae of Japan. Keigyosha. 1900. OCLC 68692846.
- Nihon sōrui meii (in Japanese). Tōkyō: Keigyōsha. 1902. OCLC 15660662.
- Icones of Japanese algae (in English and Japanese). Okamura Kintarō. 1907. OCLC 6269718. Published between 1907 and 1937, Japanese text with English summary. Total 10 volumes were bound to seven. Reprint in 2016.
  - Nihon sorui zufu = Icones of Japanese algae (in Japanese). Kazama Shobō. 1952. OCLC 14771095.
- "Some littoral diatoms of Japan". Report of the Imperial Fisheries Institute. 3 (4). Tokyo. 1911. OCLC 38025846.
- Ōraimono bunrui mokuroku (in Japanese) (2 ed.). Tōkyō: Keimeikai Jimusho. 1925.
- The distribution of marine algae in Pacific waters. 1932.
- "On Gelidium and Pterocladia of Japan". Journal of the Imperial Fisheries Institute. 29 (2). Imperial Fisheries Institute. 1934.
- Nihon sōrui zufu (in Japanese and English). 1942. OCLC 49223818.
- Nihon kaisō shi (in Japanese). Tōkyō: Uchida Rōkakuho. 1956. OCLC 33647844.
- Kaisō fu (in Japanese). Tōkyō: Tōkyō Shobō. 1984.
