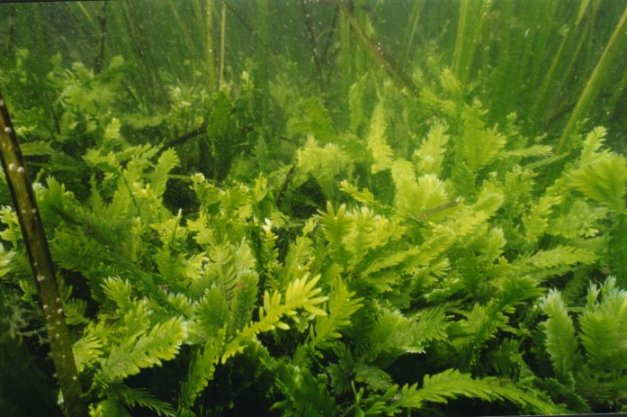
- Caulerpa taxifolia

Scientific classification
- Kingdom: Plantae
- Division: Chlorophyta
- Class: Ulvophyceae
- Order: Bryopsidales
- Family: Caulerpaceae; Kützing, 1843

Genera
- Caulerpa; Caulerpella

= Caulerpaceae =

Family of algae

Caulerpaceae is a family of green algae in the order Bryopsidales.

Caulerpaceae is considered to be a widespread and vital structural component of many Cenozoic-recent reefs. It is estimated to be responsible for approximately 25–30% of CaCO_{3} in Neogene fossil reefs.
