= List of algae of the Houtman Abrolhos =

The marine waters of the Houtman Abrolhos, an island chain off the coast of Western Australia, have been recorded as containing 260 species of benthic algae. This figure comprises 178 species of red algae (Rhodophyta), 50 species of brown algae (Phaeophyta) and 32 species of green algae (Chlorophyta). Both temperate and tropical species occur there. This is a list of algae of the Houtman Abrolhos:

== Rhodophyta ==
Porphyridiaceae

- Stylonema alsidii

Acrochaetiaceae

- Audouinella saviana

Bonnemaisoniaceae

- Asparagopsis armata
- Asparagopsis taxiformis

Ceramiaceae

- Acrothamnion preissii
- Aglaothamnion cordatum
- Anotrichium tenue
- Antithamnion antillanum
- Antithamnion armatum
- Antithamnion hanovioides
- Carpothamnion gunnianum
- Centroceras clavulatum
- Ceramium filicula
- Ceramium flaccidum
- Ceramium isogonum
- Ceramium macilentum
- Ceramium mazatlanense
- Ceramium puberulum
- Ceramium sherpherdii
- Ceramium sympodiale
- Corallophila huysmansii
- Dasyphila preissii
- Drewiana nitella
- Euptilocladia spongiosa
- Euptilota articulata
- Gattya pinnella
- Griffithsia ovalis
- Guiryella repens
- Haloplegma preissii
- Lejolisia aegagropila
- Monosporus indicus
- Perischelia glomulifera
- Pleonosporium caribaeum
- Seirospora orientalis
- Spyridia filamentosa
- Tanakaella itonoi
- Trithamnion gracilissimum
- Wrangelia plumosa

Dasyaceae

- Dasya iyengarii
- Dasya pilosa

Delesseriaceae

- Acrosorium decumbens
- Claudea elegans
- Cottoniella filamentosa
- Haraldiophyllum erosum
- Hemineura frondosa
- Heterodoxia denticulata
- Hypoglossum caloglossoides
- Hypoglossum revolutum
- Martensia australis
- Martensia fragilis
- Platysiphonia corymbosa
- Platysiphonia delicata
- Platysiphonia marginalis
- Sarcomenia delesserioides

Rhodomelaceae

- Acanthophora dendroides
- Acanthophora spicifera
- Chondria curdieana
- Chondria dangeardii
- Chondria lanceolata
- Dasyclonium flaccidum
- Dasyclonium incisum
- Dictyomenia sonderi
- Dictyomenia tridens
- Ditria expleta
- Doxodasya bolbochaete
- Endosiphonia spinuligera
- Herposiphonia secunda
  - Herposiphonia secunda f. tenella
- Heterostroma nereidiis
- Jeannerettia lobata
- Jeannerettia pedicellata
- Kuetzingia canaliculata
- Laurencia brongniartia
- Laurencia cruciata
- Laurencia filiformis
- Laurencia majuscula
- Laurencia papillosa
- Lenormandiopsis latifolia
- Leveillea jungermannioides
- Lophocladia harveyi
- Lophosiphonia prostrata
- Neurymenia fraxinifolia
- Osmundaria spiralis
- Placophora binderi
- Polysiphonia decipiens
- Polysiphonia gracilis
- Protokuetzingia australasica
- Spirocladia barodensis
- Tolypiocladia glomerulata

Corallinaceae

- Amphiroa anceps
- Amphiroa foliacea
- Amphiroa gracilis
- Haliptilon roseum
- Hydrolithon farinosum
- Hydrolithon onkodes
- Jania pulchella
- Lithophyllum bermudense
- Mesophyllum engelhartii
- Mesophyllum erubescens
- Mesophyllum funafutiense
- Metagoniolithon radiatum
- Metagoniolithon stelliferum
- Metamastophora flabellata
- Pneophyllum fragile

Gelidiaceae

- Gelidium australe
- Pterocladia lucida

Gelidiellaceae

- Gelidiella pannosa

Acrotylaceae

- Amphiplexia hymenocladioides
- Claviclonium ovatum
- Hennedya crispa

Areschougiaceae

- Areschougia ligulata
- Callophycus serratus
- Callophycus oppositifolius
- Erythroclonium sonderi
- Eucheuma denticulatum
- Eucheuma gelatinum
- Eucheuma speciosum
- Meristotheca papulosa
- Solieria robusta

Cystocloniaceae

- Craspedocarpus venosus

Dicranemataceae

- Dicranema revolutum
- Tylotus obtusatus

Dumontiaceae

- Acrosymphyton taylorii
- Dudresnaya capricornica
- Rhodopeltis borealis

Hypneaceae

- Hypnea spinella
- Hypnea valentiae

Kallymeniaceae

- Glaphrymenia pustulosa
- Kallymenia cribrogloea
- Kallymenia cribrosa

Nemastomataceae

- Nemastoma damaecornis
- Predaea laciniosa
- Predaea weldii
- Titanophora weberae

Nizymeniaceae

- Nizymania conferta

Peyssonneliaceae

- Peyssonnelia capensis
- Peyssonnelia inamoena

Phacelocarpaceae

- Phacelocarpus alatus

Rhizophyllidaceae

- Portieria hornemannii

Gracilariaceae

- Curdiea obesa
- Gracilaria canaliculata
- Gracilaria preissiana
- Gracilaria textorii

Halymeniaceae

- Codiophyllum flabelliforme
- Cryptonemia kallymenioides
- Epiphloea bullosa
- Gelinaria ulvoidea
- Halymenia floresia

Sebdeniaceae

- Sebdenia flabellata

Liagoraceae

- Dotyophycus abbottiae
- Ganonema farinosa
- Gloiotrichus fractalis
- Liagora setchellii
- Trichogloea requienii
- Yamadaella

Galaxauraceae

- Galaxaura marginata
- Galaxaura obtusata
- Galaxaura rugosa
- Scinaia tsinglanensis
- Tricleocarpa cylindrica

Plocamiaceae

- Plocamium preissianum

Champiaceae

- Champia compressa
- Champia pravula
- Champia zostericola

Lomentariaceae

- Lomentaria corallicola
- Lomentaria monochlamydea
- Semnocarpoa minuta

Rhodymeniaceae

- Asteromenia peltata
- Botryocladia skottsbergii
- Ceratodictyon spongiosum
- Chrysymenia kaernbachii
- Chrysymenia ornata
- Coelarthrum cliftonii
- Coelothrix irregularis
- Gelidiopsis variabilis
- Gloiocladia halymenioides
- Gloiocladia indica
- Gloiocladia rubrispora
- Gloiosaccion brownii
- Hymenocladia usnea
- Rhodymenia leptophylla
- Rhodymenia sonderi
- Webervanboassea splachnoides

== Phaeophyta ==
Chordariaceae

- Cladosiphon filum

Punctariaceae

- Asperococcus bullosus

Dictyotaceae

- Dictyopteris australis
- Dictyopteris muelleri
- Dictyopteris plagiogramma
- Dictyota ceylanica
- Dictyota ciliolata
- Dictyota dichotoma
  - Dictyota dichotoma var. intricata
- Dictyota furcellata
- Dictyota mertensii
- Dictyota naevosa
- Dilophus crinitus
- Dilophus fastigiatus
- Dilophus robustus
- Distromium flabellatum
- Lobophora variegata
- Pachydictyon paniculatum
- Padina boergesenii
- Padina elegans
- Padina sanctae-crucis
- Padina tenuis
- Stypopodium australasicum
- Stypopodium flabelliforme
- Zonaria turneriana

Ectocarpaceae

- Hincksia mitchelliae

Cystoseiraceae

- Caulocystis uvifera
- Cystoseira trinodis
- Hormophysa cuneiformis
- Myriodesma quercifolium
- Scaberia agardhii

Sargassaceae

- Sargassum boryi
- Sargassum decurrens
- Sargassum distichum
- Sargassum fallax
- Sargassum ligulatum
- Sargassum linearifolium
- Sargassum podacanthum
- Sargassum spinuligerum
- Sargassum tristichum
- Turbinaria gracilis

Alariaceae

- Ecklonia radiata

Scytosiphonaceae

- Colpomenia peregrina
- Hydroclathrus clathratus
- Rosenvingea orientalis

Sphacelariaceae

- Sphacelaria biradiata
- Sphacelaria novae-hollandiae
- Sphacelaria rigidula

Sporochnaceae

- Austronereia australis
- Encyothalia cliftonii
- Sporochnus comosus

== Chlorophyta ==
Bryopsidaceae

- Bryopsis australis
- Bryopsis minor
- Trichosolen hainensis

Caulerpaceae

- Caulerpa cactoides
- Caulerpa cliftonii
- Caulerpa cupressoides
- Caulerpa fergusonii
- Caulerpa lentillifera
- Caulerpa mexicana
- Caulerpa obscura
- Caulerpa racemosa
  - Caulerpa racemosa var. corynephora
  - Caulerpa racemosa var. laetivirens
  - Caulerpa racemosa var. lamourouxii
  - Caulerpa racemosa var. peltata
  - Caulerpa racemosa var. turbinata
- Caulerpa serrulata
- Caulerpa simpliciuscula
- Caulerpa webbiana

Codiaceae

- Codium duthieae
- Codium geppiorum
- Codium laminarioides
- Codium lucasii
- Codium spongiosum

Halimedaceae

- Halimeda cuneata

Udoteaceae

- Penicillus nodulosus

Anadyomenaceae

- Anadyomene brownii
- Microdictyon umbilicatum

Polyphysaceae

- Acetabularia calyculus

Siphonocladaceae

- Boodlea composita
- Cladophoropsis herpestica
- Siphonocladus tropicus
- Struvea plumosa

Valoniaceae

- Dictyosphaeria cavernosa
- Dictyosphaeria versluysii
- Valonia macrophysa

Ulvaceae

- Ulva lactuca
