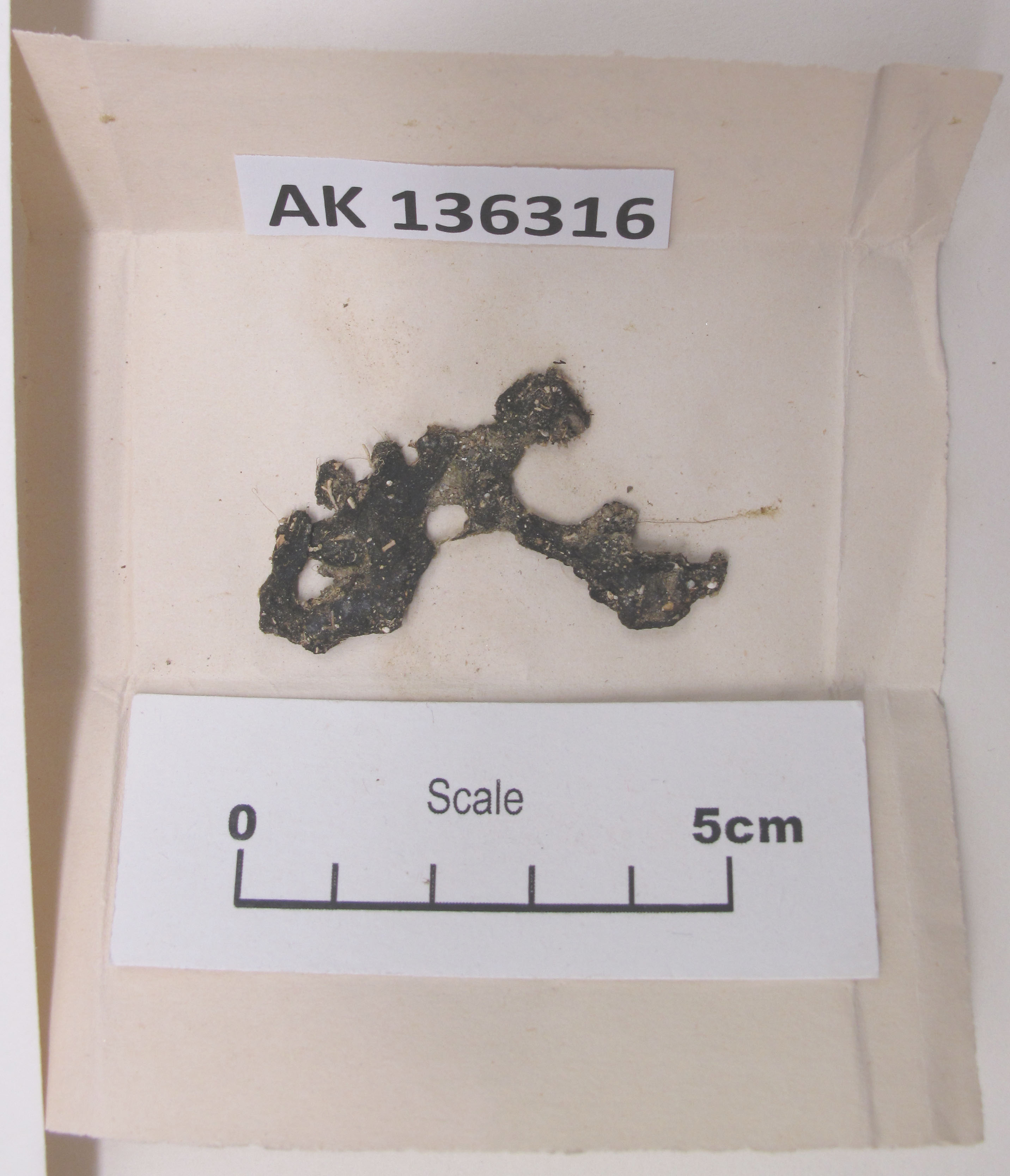

Scientific classification
- Clade: Viridiplantae
- Division: Chlorophyta
- Class: Ulvophyceae
- Order: Bryopsidales
- Family: Codiaceae
- Genus: Codium
- Species: C. capitulatum

Binomial name
- Codium capitulatum P.C.Silva & Womersley

= Codium capitulatum =

Species of alga

Codium capitulatum is a species of seaweed in the Codiaceae family.

The firm, applanate and lobed dark green thallus typically grows to a width of 1 centimetre (0.39 in) spreading to around 15 centimetres (6 in) forming large clusters of utricles.

It is found in lower eulittoral and upper sublittoral zones on rock platforms in rough waters.

In Western Australia is found along the coast in Busselton and Hopetoun. Its range extends around southern Australia to Victoria.
