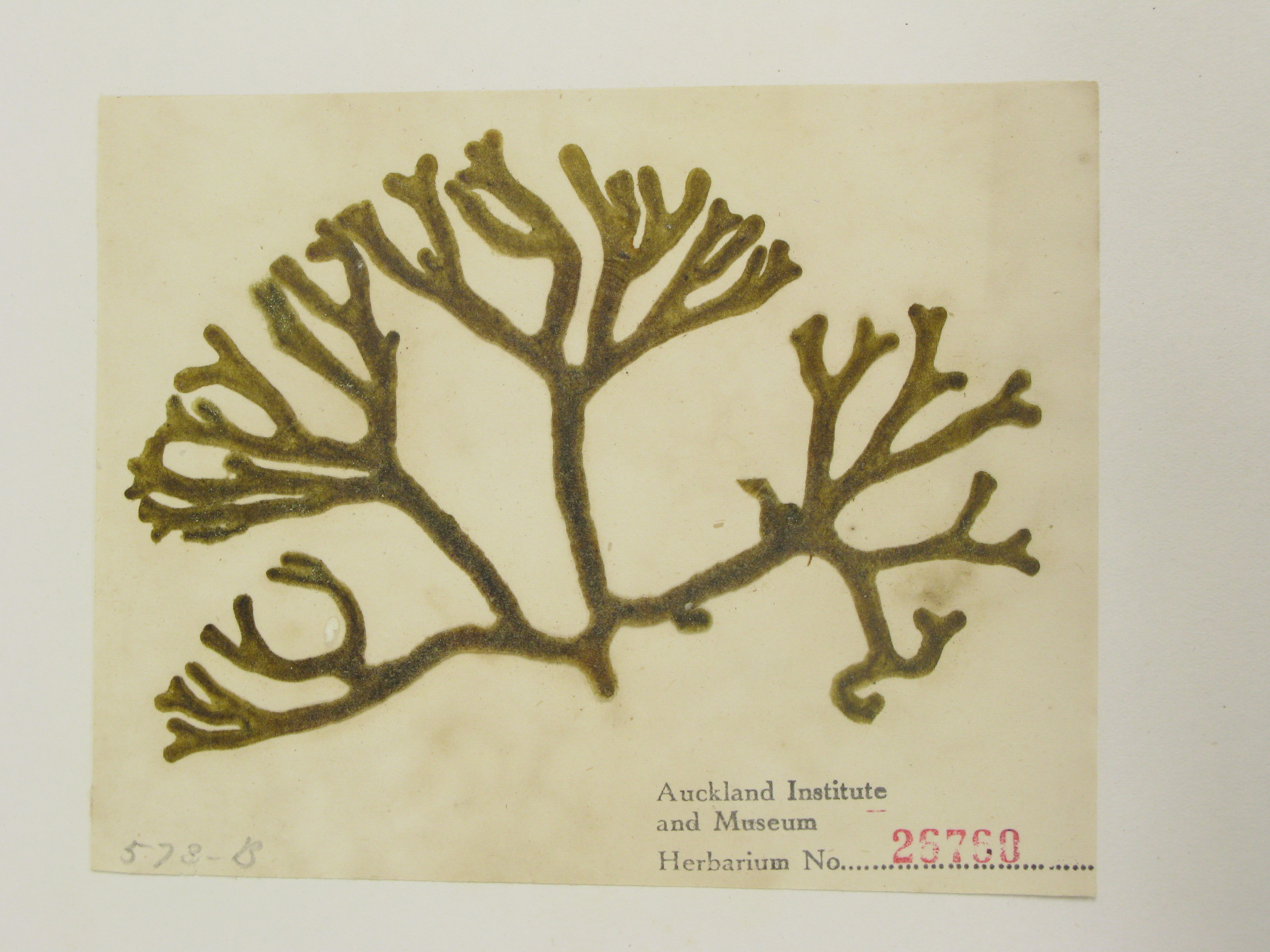
- Herbarium specimen of Codium duthiae

Scientific classification
- Clade: Viridiplantae
- Division: Chlorophyta
- Class: Ulvophyceae
- Order: Bryopsidales
- Family: Codiaceae
- Genus: Codium
- Species: C. duthiae

Binomial name
- Codium duthiae P.C.Silva

= Codium duthiae =

Species of seaweed

Codium duthiae is a species of seaweed in the Codiaceae family.

The epilithic green marine alga typically grows to a height of 60 centimetres (24 in). It has a discoid holdfast with spongy erect fronds on terete branches.

It is found on coastal area with light to moderate water movement from the low tide mark to a depth of 25 metres (82 ft)

In Western Australia is found along the coast near Shark Bay extending down around the south coast. Its range extends around southern Australia to Victoria and northern Tasmania
