= Codium australasicum =

Scientific classification
- Clade: Viridiplantae
- Division: Chlorophyta
- Class: Ulvophyceae
- Order: Bryopsidales
- Family: Codiaceae
- Genus: Codium
- Species: C. australasicum

Binomial name
- Codium australasicum P.C.Silva

Species of seaweed

Codium australasicum is a species of seaweed in the Codiaceae family.

The erect dark green thallus typically grows to a height of 50 centimetres (20 in). It is repeatedly dichotomous and has terete branches.

It is found in sublittoral zones in rough shaded waters up to 33 metres (108 ft) in depth.

In Western Australia it is found along the coast in two places; near Rockingham and Albany. Its range extends around southern Australia, including Tasmania and Tuggerah in New South Wales as well as on the coast of New Zealand.
