= Codium bernabei =

Scientific classification
- Kingdom: Plantae
- Division: Chlorophyta
- Class: Ulvophyceae
- Order: Bryopsidales
- Family: Codiaceae
- Genus: Codium
- Species: C. bernabei

Binomial name
- Codium bernabei A.V.González, M.E.Chacana & P.C.Silva, 2012

Species of alga

Codium bernabei is a species of green algae in the family Codiaceae. It is a coalescing green seaweed from the coast of Chile characterized by its uniform utricles.
