= Codium arenicola =

Scientific classification
- Clade: Viridiplantae
- Division: Chlorophyta
- Class: Ulvophyceae
- Order: Bryopsidales
- Family: Codiaceae
- Genus: Codium
- Species: C. arenicola

Binomial name
- Codium arenicola Chacana & P.C.Silva

Species of seaweed

Codium arenicola is a species of seaweed in the Codiaceae family.

In Western Australia is found along the coast in the Pilbara region of Western Australia near Karratha.
