= Codium harveyi =

Scientific classification
- Clade: Viridiplantae
- Division: Chlorophyta
- Class: Ulvophyceae
- Order: Bryopsidales
- Family: Codiaceae
- Genus: Codium
- Species: C. harveyi

Binomial name
- Codium harveyi P.C.Silva

Species of seaweed

Codium harveyi is a species of seaweed in the Codiaceae family.

The erect medium green thallus branches dichotomously and typically grows to a height of 30 centimetres (11.8 in). The branches are terete and around 3 to 5 millimetres (0.12 to 0.20 in) wide and taper toward the apices.

It is found in the sublittoral zone in moderate water coasts from the low tide mark to a depth of 30 metres (98 ft).

In Western Australia is found along the coast in the Gascoyne and Mid West regions extending along the south coast and along the east coast of New South Wales and the north coast of Tasmania. It is also widespread throughout the Indian and Pacific Oceans.
