= Codium taylorii =

Scientific classification
- Clade: Viridiplantae
- Division: Chlorophyta
- Class: Ulvophyceae
- Order: Bryopsidales
- Family: Codiaceae
- Genus: Codium
- Species: C. taylorii

Binomial name
- Codium taylorii P.C.Silva

Species of seaweed

Codium taylorii is a species of seaweed in the Codiaceae family.

The one to several erect frond thallus usually grows to around 15 centimetres (5.91 in) in height.

In Western Australia is found along the coast in the Kimberley and Gascoyne regions. It is found in many other tropical waters.
