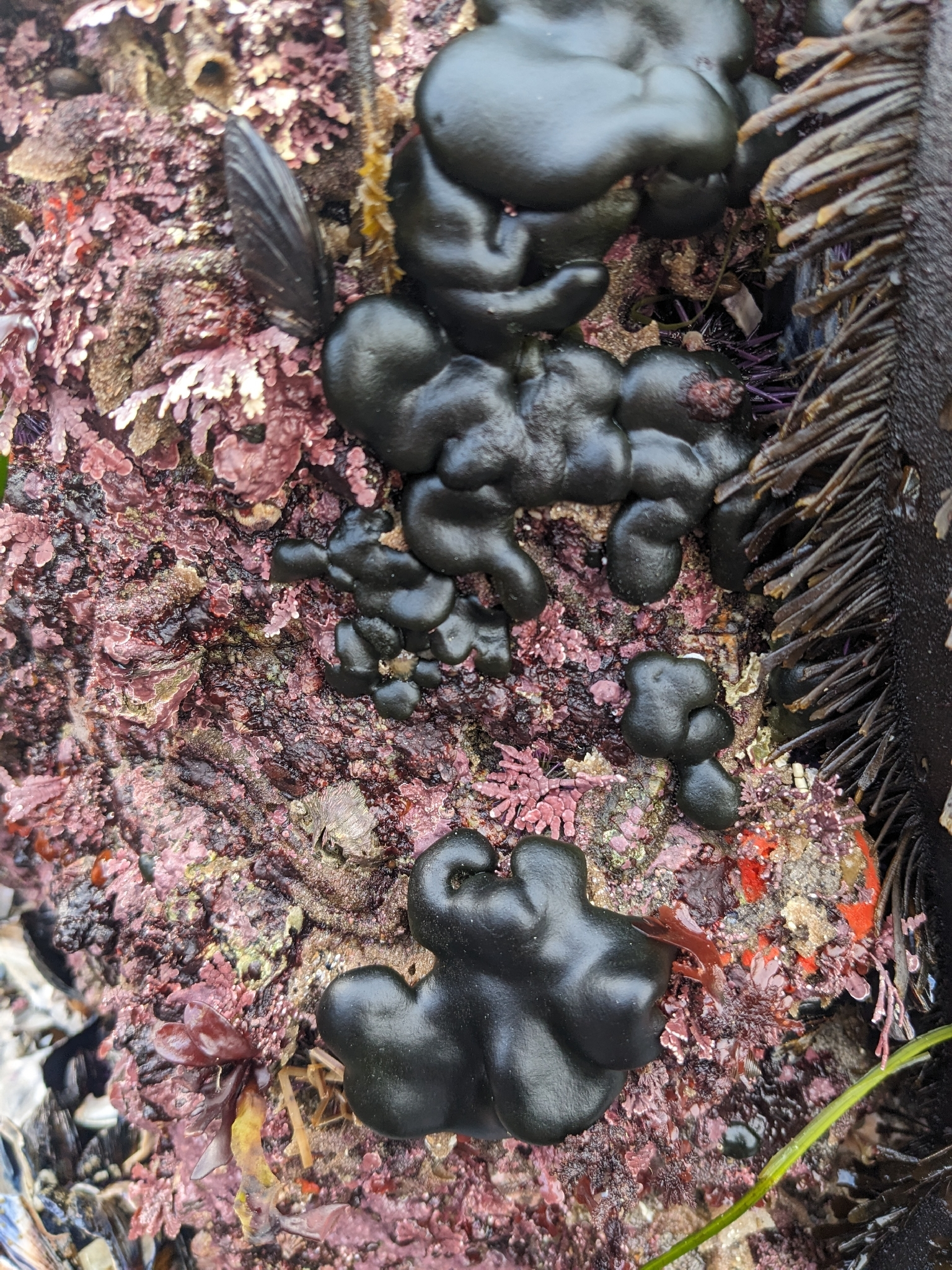

Scientific classification
- Kingdom: Plantae
- Division: Chlorophyta
- Class: Ulvophyceae
- Order: Bryopsidales
- Family: Codiaceae
- Genus: Codium
- Species: C. setchellii

Binomial name
- Codium setchellii Gardner, N.L.

= Codium setchellii =

Species of algae

Codium setchellii, commonly called green felt algae, is an Eastern Pacific species in the Codium genus of marine green macroalgae (green seaweed). It was described by in 1919 by N.L. Gardner. The holotype specimen was collected in Pacific Grove, California in 1897 by Mrs. J.M. Weeks, a prolific and highly knowledgeable amateur phycologist and seaweed collector.

== Description ==
Codium setchellii is a green to greenish-black bulbous, gently wrinkled cushion that is 6–15 mm (0.24–0.59 in) in thickness and up to 25 cm (9.8 in) in diameter. Like other members of the order Bryopsidales, each individual is an enormous single cell packed with multiple nuclei. At times, individuals may exceed 25 cm in diameter if two meet and grow together. The surface appears glossy to velvet-like, similar to globs of tar. This seaweed is tightly fused to the rock surface it grows on. It has a texture similar to thick velvet or felt. The smooth thallus surface is formed from tightly packed filaments. It appears quite similar to Codium convolutum, but this species has only been recorded in the Southwest Pacific around New Zealand. It also looks extremely similar to Codium ritteri, the coarse spongy cushion, which overlaps in range and habitat with C. setchellii in Alaskan and British Columbian waters. C. setchellii appears smoother than C. ritteri, which has a minutely dotted surface.

== Range ==
Codium setchellii is found in the East Pacific from Alaska to Baja California.

== Habitat ==
Codium setchellii occupies marine shorelines in the mid intertidal to upper subtidal region, and is most commonly found in the low intertidal zone. It adheres to rock faces and is usually found on vertical surfaces and can withstand exposure to wave action and periodic burial in sand. It cannot, however, withstand harsh sun or drying conditions, preferring moist, shady microhabitats such as crevices, overhangs, and north faces. Persistently low levels of coastal fog causes increased mortality due to increased UV exposure.

== Ecology ==
Codium setchellii is not a very abundant species; even when it is present in suitable habitat, it has been recorded as covering only 1.8% of available surfaces in one study. The relative rarity of Codium setchellii is thought to be related both to its particular microhabitat requirements and the efficiency of herbivores. Codium setchellii is eaten by a variety of grazers, predominately the sea slug Placida dendritica in the spring and summer and the snail Lacuna marmorata in the fall and winter. Placida dendritica engages in kleptoplasty, sequestering chloroplasts from the seaweed, which helps it camouflage while grazing. P. dendritica specializes on C. setchellii and similar algal species, and is extremely efficient at seeking out new sources of C. setchellii to graze on, sometimes amassing groups of 70-90 sea slugs per C. setchelli thallus.

A transplantation study of this species to new habitat show that it can only grow when sand is present nearby. This is because while it cannot adhere to or grow on sand itself, transient burial in or scouring by sand serves to deter an overabundance of algae grazers that can otherwise quickly eliminate this slow-growing seaweed. While it grows slowly, the encrusting C. setchellii can at times overtake and smother other rock-adherent life, including other algae and sessile invertebrates.

As a cushion-forming macroalgae, many other species of macroalgae have been found growing atop it as epiphytes. These include species of red algae such as Colaconema rhizoideum , as well as Antithamnion densum, Campylaephora gardneri, Erythrotrichia carnea, Griffithsia pacifica, Herposiphonia plumula, Polysiphonia pacifica, Porphyrostromium boryanum, and Pterosiphonia dendroidea. Other ephiphytes on C. setchelli include species of brown algae such as Ectocarpus commensalis , Ectocarpus siliculosus , and Feldmannia simplex.

== Life cycle ==
Codium setchellii is unusually long-lived for green algae; if it survives early life and attains a diameter of 4 cm or more, it will likely live for several years. As in most other Codium species, the life cycle is likely a simple diplontic sexual one. Reproduction mainly takes place in winter, from November to December, when the dominant diploid thallus develops gametangia. This species is dioecious, meaning that the male and female gametangia are formed in separate individuals. Both types of gametangia spawn mobile, flagellated gametes. After fertilization occurs in the seawater, the zygote eventually settles on a rocky surface and a diploid germling begins to grow into an adult thallus.

Parthenogenesis has not been observed in this species, but occurs in its congener Codium fragile. Neither is there evidence that this species can asexually reproduce via fragmentation of the thallus. While experimental transplantation is possible, broken off pieces of thallus are not able to re-adhere by themselves to a rocky surface, and thus die.

== Etymology ==
The epithet setchellii honors William Albert Setchell, a colleague of N. L. Gardner, who also worked to describe members of the Codium genus.

== Taxonomy ==
The heterotypic synonym Codium adhaerens var. incrassatum (Dellow 1952) is not an accepted name.
