= Codium strangulatum =

Scientific classification
- Clade: Viridiplantae
- Division: Chlorophyta
- Class: Ulvophyceae
- Order: Bryopsidales
- Family: Codiaceae
- Genus: Codium
- Species: C. strangulatum

Binomial name
- Codium strangulatum Chacana & P.C.Silva

Species of seaweed

Codium strangulatum is a species of seaweed in the Codiaceae family.

The soft but erect thallus usually grows to around 12 centimetres (4.72 in) in height and has dichotomous delicate and filiform branches.

In Western Australia is found off the coast in the Pilbara and Kimberley regions. It is also found around the Philippines but is considered to be rare.
