= Codium spinescens =

Scientific classification
- Clade: Viridiplantae
- Division: Chlorophyta
- Class: Ulvophyceae
- Order: Bryopsidales
- Family: Codiaceae
- Genus: Codium
- Species: C. spinescens

Binomial name
- Codium spinescens P.C.Silva & Womersley

Species of alga

Codium spinescens is a species of seaweed in the Codiaceae family.

The firm medium to dark green thallus branches dichotomously habit and is usually around 20 centimetres (7.9 in)in height.

In Western Australia is found along the coast around the Abrolhos Islands extending along the south coast as far as the Head of the Bight in South Australia.
