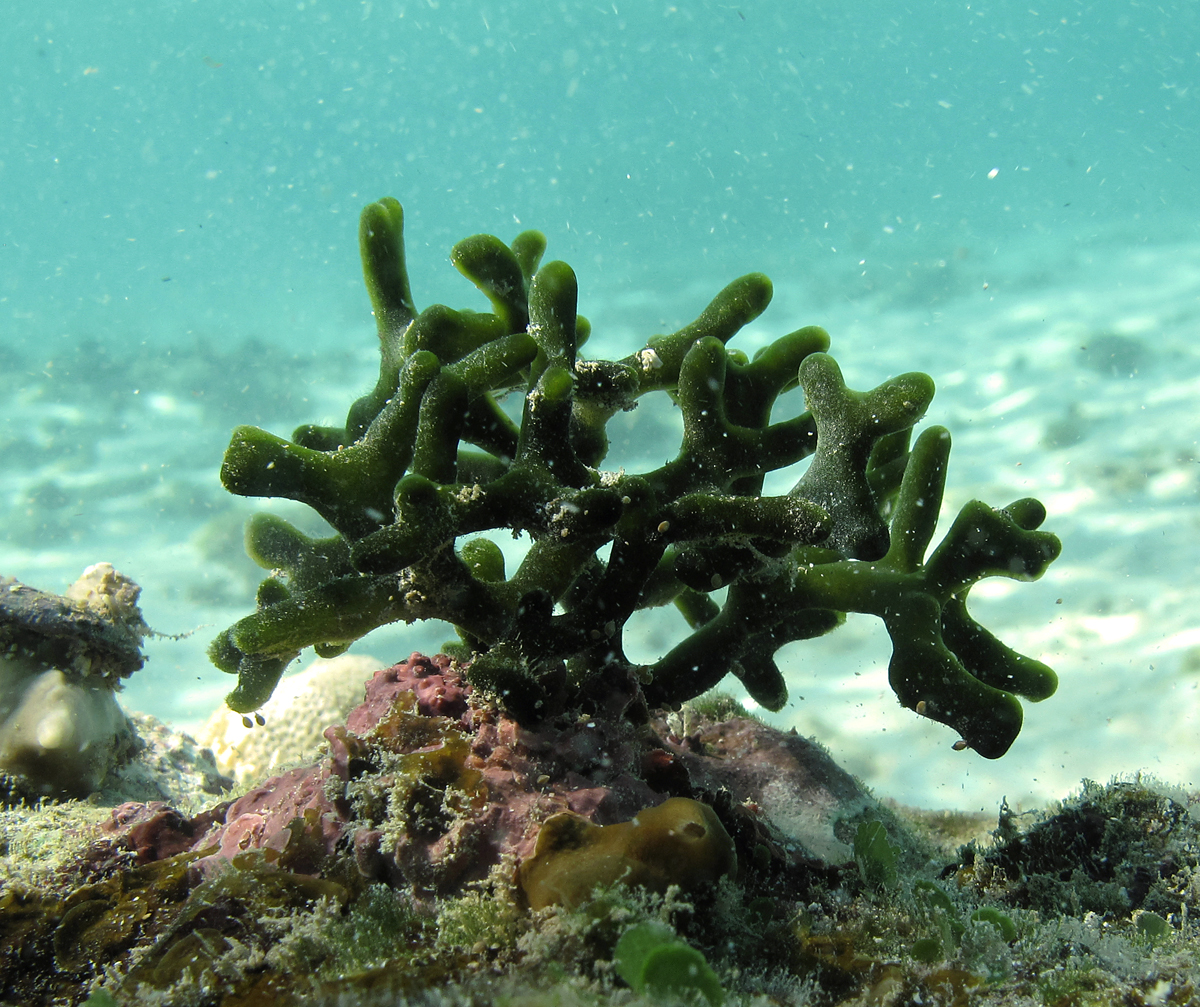
- Codium spongiosum off the Réunion coast

Scientific classification
- Kingdom: Plantae
- Division: Chlorophyta
- Class: Ulvophyceae
- Order: Bryopsidales
- Family: Codiaceae
- Genus: Codium; Stackhouse, 1797

Type species
- Codium tomentosum Stackhouse, 1797

Species
- See text

= Codium =

Genus of algae

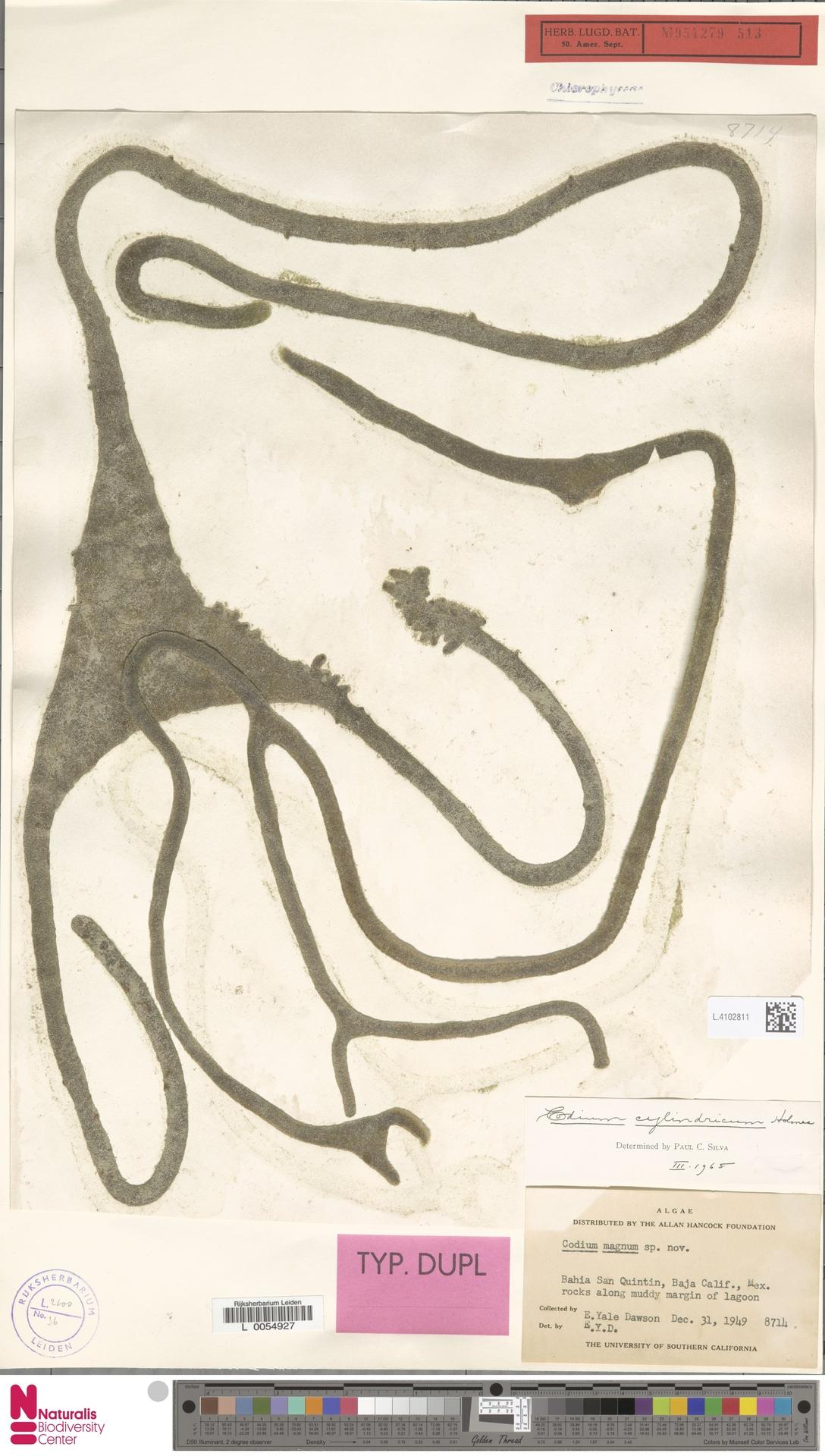
Codium cylindricum Holmes, type definition herbarium specimen pressed

Codium is a genus of edible green macroalgae (or seaweed) under the order Bryopsidales. The genus name is derived from a Greek word that pertains to the soft texture of its thallus. One of the foremost experts on Codium taxonomy was Paul Claude Silva at the University of California, Berkeley. Silva was able to describe 36 species for the genus, and in honor of his work on Codium, the species C. silvae was named after him.

== Taxonomy and nomenclature ==
This genus is the largest member of the algal family Codiaceae and consequently under order Bryopsidales and it currently has about 143 confirmed species and four (4) unresolved members. Stackhouse, unfortunately, failed to provide holotype specimens for C. tomentosum (type species) and some of its dichotomously branching congeners leading to misidentifications; P.C. Silva delineated C. tomentosum, C. fragile, and C. vermilara and established neotypes for each species to finally resolve this taxonomic blunder.

== Morphology ==
Being a member of the order Bryopsidales, Codium is coenocytic and siphonous. Their spongy thallus is composed of a single, multinucleated, branched, tubular cell called siphon which terminates at a swollen end called the utricle. These siphons intertwine with each other to form the clear mesh-like center of the Codium thallus called the medulla while the utricles surround this central layer to form a green to dark-green palisade layer called the cortex.

The genus has a wide variety of thalli forms: (1) mat-forming, the thalli encrusts and adheres to given a substrate using its medullary filaments; (2) spherical, the thalli forms a ball and is superficially attached to an area using rhizoidal filaments; and (4) erect thalli, typically dichotomously branched with its medulla surrounded by utricles. In addition to its thalli variations, the utricles which forms its thallus also has variety of forms, mainly based on their apical wall thickness and apex shapes.

Similar to most seaweed species, Codium species also exhibit a wide range of morphological plasticity which has been a great challenge to its morphology-based taxonomy.

== Distribution ==
In terms of its natural range, Codium has a latitudinal range that encompasses the tropical to temperate areas, however, this genus is not found in the frigid polar regions of the world.

=== Ireland ===
Two of these species are very rare in Ireland. Codium adhaerens has been recorded from a few sites on the west coast and from Tory Island on the north coast in County Donegal. In 1837 it was found in Church Bay in County Antrim, but has not been found there since.

- Codium adhaerens C.Agardh
- Codium bursa (Linnaeus) C.Agardh - has been found in Mulroy Bay in County Donegal in 1977 (specimen in the Ulster Museum) and 1988. There is an old record of it from "near Belfast" between 1793 and 1810.
- Codium fragile (Suringar) Hariot
  - Codium fragile subsp. atlanticum (A. Cotton) Silva
- Codium tomentosum Stackhouse
- Codium vermilara (Olivi) Delle Chiaje

There are other species of "doubtful validity":- Codium amphibium is included in William Henry Harvey's Phycologia Britannica Pl.xxxv. and noted as: "spreading in patches of great extent along the edge of the sea, over the surface of a turf-bog which meets the shore at Roundstone Bay" (Ireland).

=== Worldwide ===
- Codium arabicum Kütz. - Australia
- Codium arenicola Chacana & P.C.Silva - Australia
- Codium australasicum P.C.Silva - Australia
- Codium bernabei A.V.González, M.E.Chacana & P.C.Silva - Chile
- Codium bulbopilum Setch. - Australia
- Codium bursa C.Agardh. - North Atlantic and Mediterranean
- Codium capitulatum P.C.Silva & Womersley - Australia
- Codium convolutum (Dellow) P.C.Silva - New Zealand
- Codium cranwelliae Setch. - New Zealand
- Codium cuneatum S. & G. - California (United States)
- Codium decorticatum - Global
- Codium duthiae Silva - Australia, Tasmania, and South Africa
- Codium dwarkense Børgesen - Australia
- Codium edule - Indo-Pacific, including Hawaii
- Codium extricatum Silva - Cape Agulhas to southern KwaZulu-Natal
- Codium fragile (Suringar) Hariot - Nova Scotia (Canada)
  - Codium fragile Sui song - (Chinese) Japan, American Pacific from Alaska to Cape Horn, Australia and New Zealand, British Isles, Norway, Denmark, and Netherlands
  - Codium fragile subsp. capense Silva - South Africa
- Codium galeatum J.Agardh - Australia
- Codium geppiorum O.C.Schmidt - Australia and Indo-Pacific South Africa
- Codium harveyi P.C.Silva - Australia
- Codium hubbsii Daws. - California (U.S.A.)
- Codium intertextum Collins & Hervey
- Codium isthmocladum Vickers
- Codium johnstonei Silva - California (U.S.A.)
- Codium laminarioides Harv. - Australia
- Codium lucasii Setchell - Australia, Tasmania
- Codium mamillosum Harv. - Australia
- Codium muelleri Kütz. - Australia
- Codium perriniae A.H.S.Lucas - Australia
- Codium pomoides J.Agardh - Australia
- Codium ritteri - Northern Pacific (Alaska, British Columbia, Kamchatka)
- Codium setchellii Gardn. - California (U.S.A.)
- Codium silvae Womersley - Australia
- Codium spinescens P.C.Silva & Womersley - Australia
- Codium spinulosum Y. Lee - Korea
- Codium spongiosum Harv. - Australia
- Codium strangulatum Chacana & P.C.Silva - Australia
- Codium taylorii Silva - Australia
- Codium repens (P.Crouan & H.Crouan) Vickers
- Codium tenue (Kütz.) Kütz. - Australia
- Codium tomentosum Stackh. - Australia

=== Invasion of Codium spp. ===
Even though Codium species are well-distributed across the globe, certain species have managed to escape their natural range and invade other areas. In the case of C. fragile spp. tomentosoides, commonly known as "oyster thief", the increasing marine traffic has made it possible for it to escape its natural locality (Japan) and spread to Europe and USA forcing devastating biodiversity and aquacultural losses.

== Ecology ==
Codium has been observed to inhabit both from the intertidal zone down to the subtidal area.

== Life history ==
Codium, like most ulvophycean seaweeds, exhibit a diplontic life history wherein the dominant diploid (2N) thallus produces the male and female gametangia that will produce the haploid (N) gametes through meiosis. Moreover, Codium are also capable of fragmentation, which has led to its unwanted spread across the globe.

== Exploitation, harvesting and cultivation ==
South Korea is the leading consumer and producer of farmed Codium (commonly known as cheonggak) in the world; with about 4000 metric tons of fresh weight produced in 2017 and valued at 2 million US dollars. Farming and cultivation of Codium in South Korea is a thriving industry; their method first involves seeding a rope line with isolated pieces of utricles and medullary filaments and finally transferring it into the open sea for the grow-out cultivation.

== Chemical composition/Natural products chemistry ==
A recent review on the bioactivity of the genus Codium has revealed that most of its polysaccharides, glycoproteins, galactans, anionic macromolecules, and other extracts/compounds have shown to have a variety of uses as immunostimulatory, anticoagulant, anticancer, anti-inflammatory, antibacterial, antifungal, and antiviral agent.

== Utilization and Management ==
Codium is used either fresh or dry and is typically cooked and seasoned with soy sauce and vinegar or mixed with kimchi.
