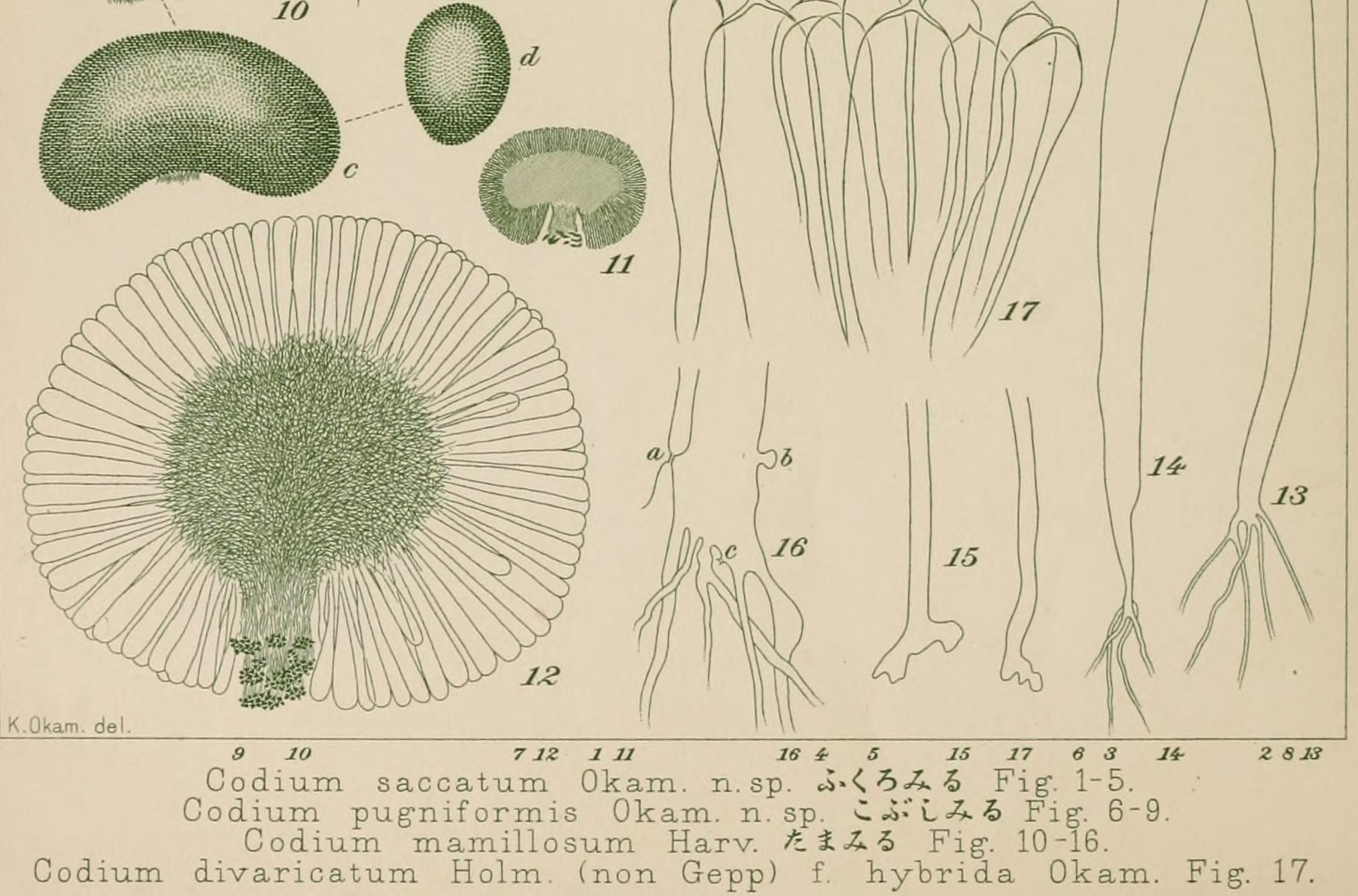

Scientific classification
- Clade: Viridiplantae
- Division: Chlorophyta
- Class: Ulvophyceae
- Order: Bryopsidales
- Family: Codiaceae
- Genus: Codium
- Species: C. mamillosum

Binomial name
- Codium mamillosum Harv.

= Codium mamillosum =

Species of seaweed

Codium mamillosum is a species of seaweed in the Codiaceae family.

The medium green globose thallus has a diameter of around 8 centimetres (3.15 in) that is attached to a tuft of rhizoids.

It is found from low tidal areas to a depth of 40 metres (131 ft) sublittoral zone in moderate water coasts.

In Western Australia is found along the coast in the Mid West region extending along the south coast and along the east coast of Victoria. The species is also found around Hawaii and Japan.
