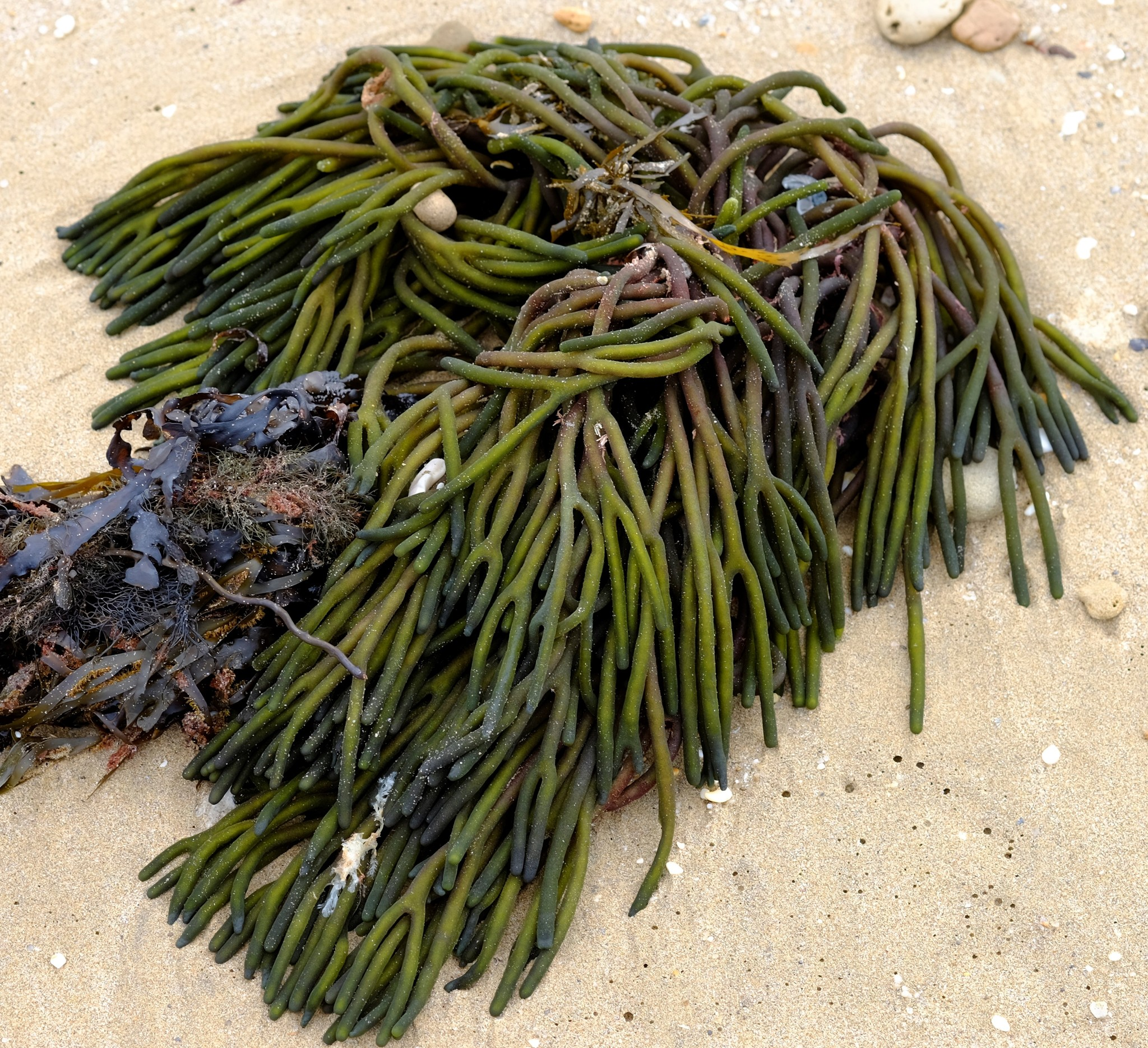

Scientific classification
- Clade: Viridiplantae
- Division: Chlorophyta
- Class: Ulvophyceae
- Order: Bryopsidales
- Family: Codiaceae
- Genus: Codium
- Species: C. galeatum

Binomial name
- Codium galeatum J.Agardh

= Codium galeatum =

Species of seaweed

Codium galeatum is a species of seaweed in the Codiaceae family.

The firm, erect medium green thallus with regular dichotomous branches typically grows to a height of 1 metre (3 ft).

It is commonly found on rough water coasts from the low tide mark to a depth of 37 metres (121 ft).

In Western Australia it is found along the coast in Mid West, extending down to the southern coast. It extends as far as Ballina in New South Wales and is found along Tasmanian coasts.
