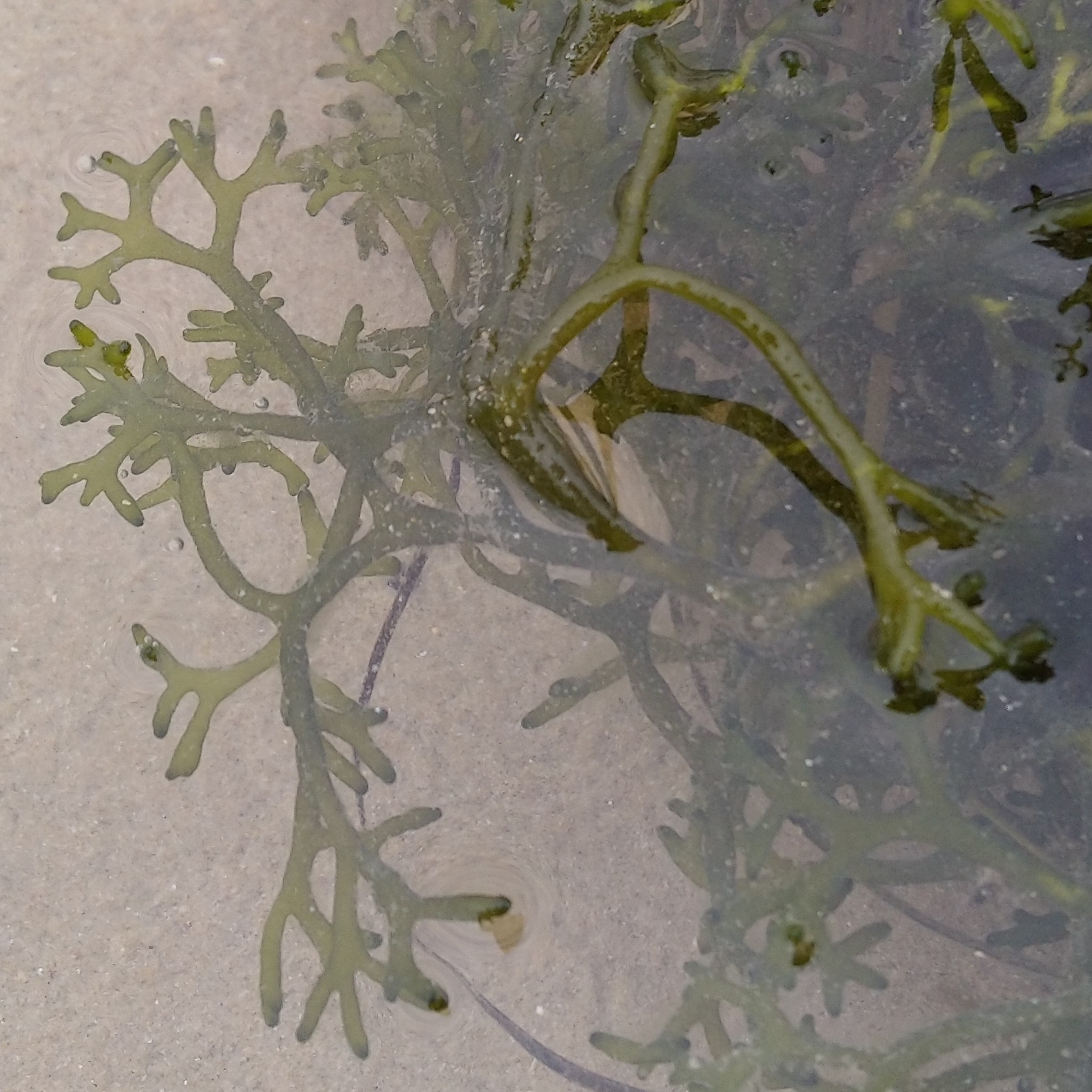

Scientific classification
- Clade: Viridiplantae
- Division: Chlorophyta
- Class: Ulvophyceae
- Order: Bryopsidales
- Family: Codiaceae
- Genus: Codium
- Species: C. tenue

Binomial name
- Codium tenue (Kütz.) Kütz.

= Codium tenue =

Species of seaweed

Codium tenue is a species of seaweed in the Codiaceae family.

In Western Australia it is found along the coast in one small area in the South West region.
