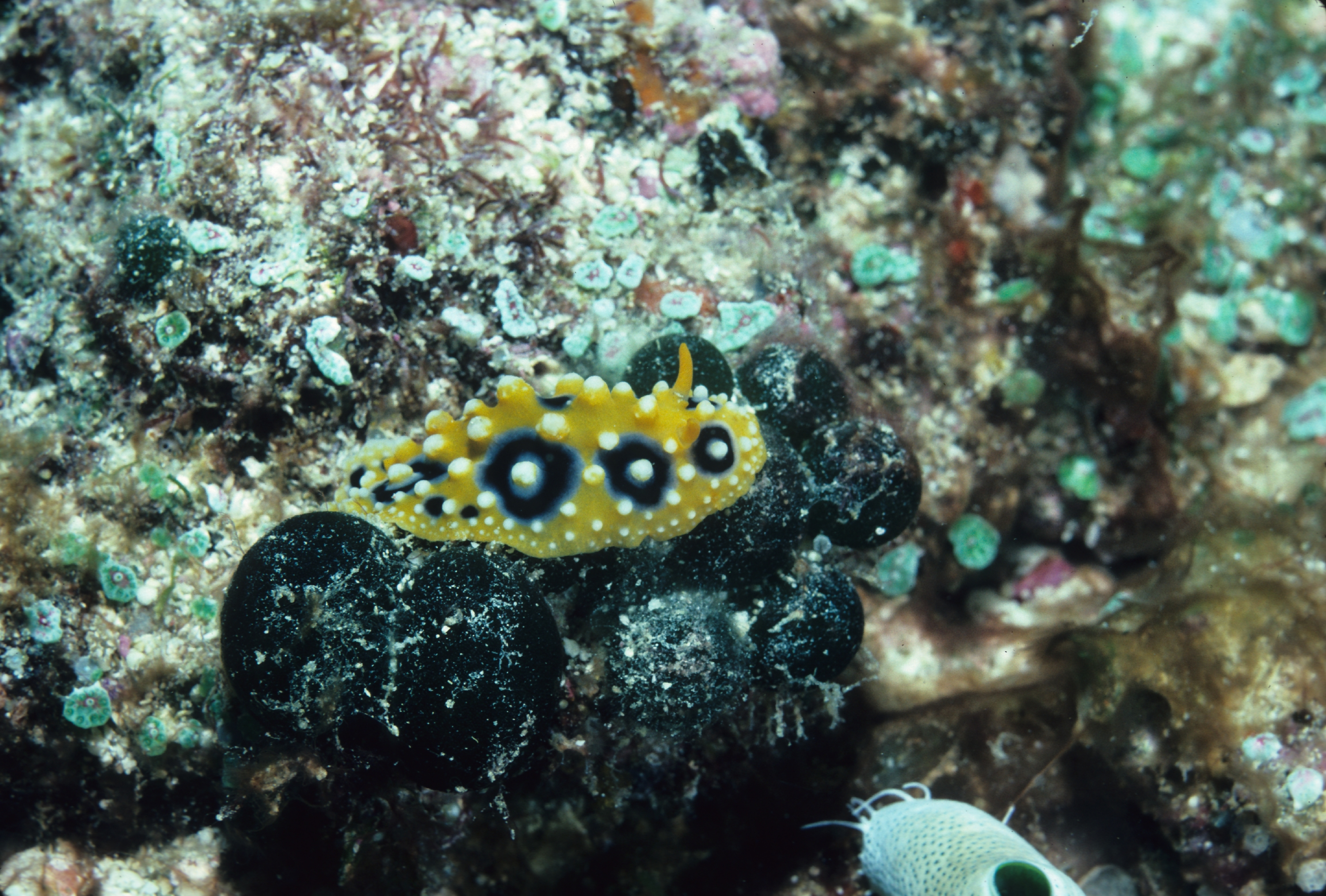
- A nudibranch (yellow) on Codium arabicum (green) off Wilson Island, Australia

Scientific classification
- Clade: Viridiplantae
- Division: Chlorophyta
- Class: Ulvophyceae
- Order: Bryopsidales
- Family: Codiaceae
- Genus: Codium
- Species: C. arabicum

Binomial name
- Codium arabicum Kütz.

= Codium arabicum =

Green sea cushion

Species of alga

Codium arabicum, commonly known as green sea cushion, is a species of seaweed in the Codiaceae family.

The seaweed has a dorsiventral and applanate thallus that typically grows to a width of 12 centimetres (5 in). The dark green thallus forms an amorphous and somewhat convoluted mass that has a spongy texture which. The mass is made up of a central medulla and cortex. The medulla is composed of cylindrical filaments that are branched into tips forming clavate utricles which form the cortex.

It is found in the Indian and Pacific Oceans. Along the east coast of Africa, most Asian coastlines, Australia and New Zealand, South America on the Chilean coast and many islands in the Pacific.

In Western Australia is found along the coast in the Kimberley, Pilbara and Gascoyne regions of Western Australia.
