= Codium dwarkense =

Scientific classification
- Clade: Viridiplantae
- Division: Chlorophyta
- Class: Ulvophyceae
- Order: Bryopsidales
- Family: Codiaceae
- Genus: Codium
- Species: C. dwarkense

Binomial name
- Codium dwarkense Børgesen

Species of seaweed

Codium dwarkense is a species of seaweed in the Codiaceae family.

The erect to decumbent thallus is attached to a spongy base.

It is found in the intertidal and subtidal zones.

In Western Australia is found along the coast in Kimberley and Pilbara regions. It is also found off the east coast of Africa, islands of the Indian Ocean and coasts of south west Asia.
