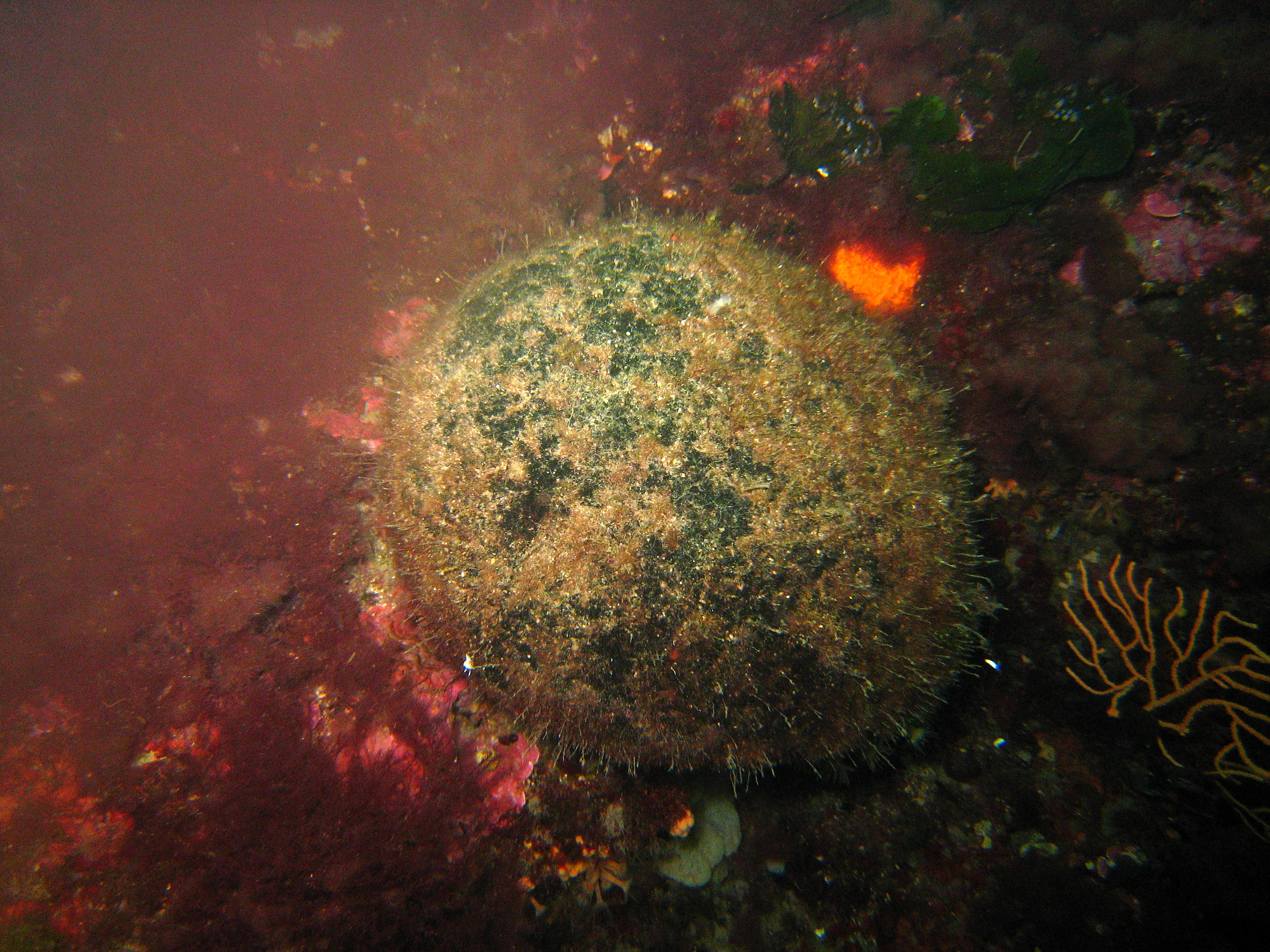
- Codium bursa in Niolon near Marseille

Scientific classification
- Kingdom: Plantae
- Division: Chlorophyta
- Class: Ulvophyceae
- Order: Bryopsidales
- Family: Codiaceae
- Genus: Codium
- Species: C. bursa

Binomial name
- Codium bursa C.Agardh, 1817

= Codium bursa =

Species of alga

Codium bursa is a green marine algae of medium size.

== Description ==
Codium bursa is a marine alga growing to 30 cm across. It generally appears as a spongy sphere of utricles which at the surface form a cortex. It is composed of loosely packed filaments which at the surface form a cortex of utricles which are single celled bladder-like or club-shaped structures. It has a velvety texture and is dark green in colour. The alga is attached by a holdfast of filaments.

== Distribution ==
In the Atlantic from the Canary Islands to the ireland, where they perhaps are originating further south, since C. bursa is very persistent in drift. In Ireland the most recent record was in 1977 from County Donegal. also recorded from other countries in Europe. In the Mediterranean often found accompanying the seagrass Posidonia oceanica and commonly found beachcast amongst leaves of Posidonia oceanica.

== Habitat ==
Codium bursa grows sublittorally attached to rock to 10 m deep in the Atlantic Ocean and up to 50 meters deep in the Mediterranean Sea.

== See also ==
- Marimo, a round, freshwater algae
