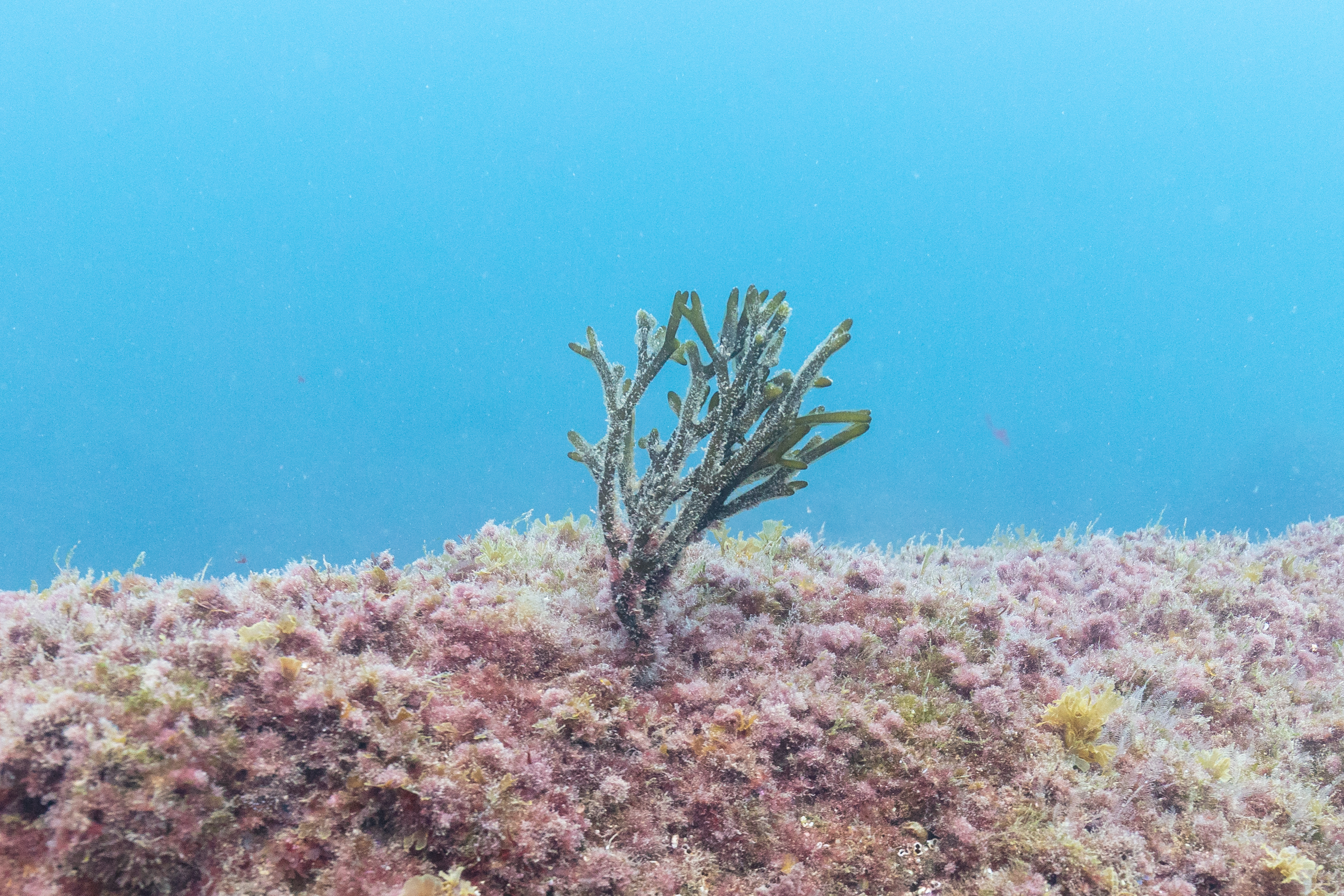
- Codium tomentosum in the coast of Santander (Spain).

Scientific classification
- Kingdom: Plantae
- Division: Chlorophyta
- Class: Ulvophyceae
- Order: Bryopsidales
- Family: Codiaceae
- Genus: Codium
- Species: C. tomentosum

Binomial name
- Codium tomentosum Stackhouse, 1797

Synonyms
- Fucus tomentosus var. marginifer Turner, 1811; Codium dichotomum

= Codium tomentosum =

Species of alga

Codium tomentosum is a species of green seaweed in the family Codiaceae. Its common names include velvet horn and spongeweed.

== Description ==
The holdfast of C. tomentosum is saucer-shaped and has closely woven strands giving it a uniform appearance. The thallus or frond has a dichotomous, much branched structure with thin branches, each with a circular cross section. It grows to 30 cm (12 in) in length and is spongy, with the texture of felt. It is covered with colourless hairs which are visible when it is submerged. The cortex is composed of club-shaped vesicles forming a palisade-like layer.

== Distribution and habitat ==
C. tomentosum is native to the north east Atlantic Ocean from the Ireland southwards to the Azores and Cape Verde. It has also been recorded around the coasts of Africa and in various other parts of the world. The type locality is England. It is found on exposed rocks in deep rock pools on the lower shore.

== Ecology ==
The related taxon, C. fragile subsp. tomentosoides, has been spreading to various parts of the world, and a study was undertaken in 2003 in Guernsey to see whether it was displacing or even eliminating C. tomentosum from the island. It was found that, on the contrary, the native species was still thriving on the lower shore and that C. fragile subsp. tomentosoides was restricted to rock pools in the upper mid-littoral region.

A similar study undertaken in 2000 on exposed shores in western Ireland showed that, as compared to thirty years earlier, C. fragile subsp. tomentosoides had decreased while C. fragile subsp. atlanticum had increased. The native C. tomentosum had maintained its population size and not been displaced.

The sea slug Elysia viridis (the "sap-sucking slug") feeds on C. tomentosum and C. fragile and has a symbiotic relationship with them. When the fluids from the algae are ingested, the chloroplasts remain intact and photosynthetically active in the digestive diverticula of the slug for some days. They continue to synthesize sugars which the slug then metabolises. The activity of the chloroplasts degenerates over time and they need to be constantly replaced by further consumption of Codium spp.

== Research ==
A lectin named tomentine has been isolated by affinity chromatography from C. tomentosum. It shows N-acetylglucosamine-specific activity and has been found to be rich in glycine, threonine and valine.
