= Codium spinulosum =

Scientific classification
- Kingdom: Plantae
- Division: Chlorophyta
- Class: Ulvophyceae
- Order: Bryopsidales
- Family: Codiaceae
- Genus: Codium
- Species: C. spinulosum

Binomial name
- Codium spinulosum Y.Lee

Species of seaweed

Codium spinulosum is a species of seaweed in the Codiaceae family. It was first described in 2008 by Yongpil Lee.

It is endemic to South Korea, where it grows along the coast of Jeju Island from the low tide line to depths of 40 to 60 m.
