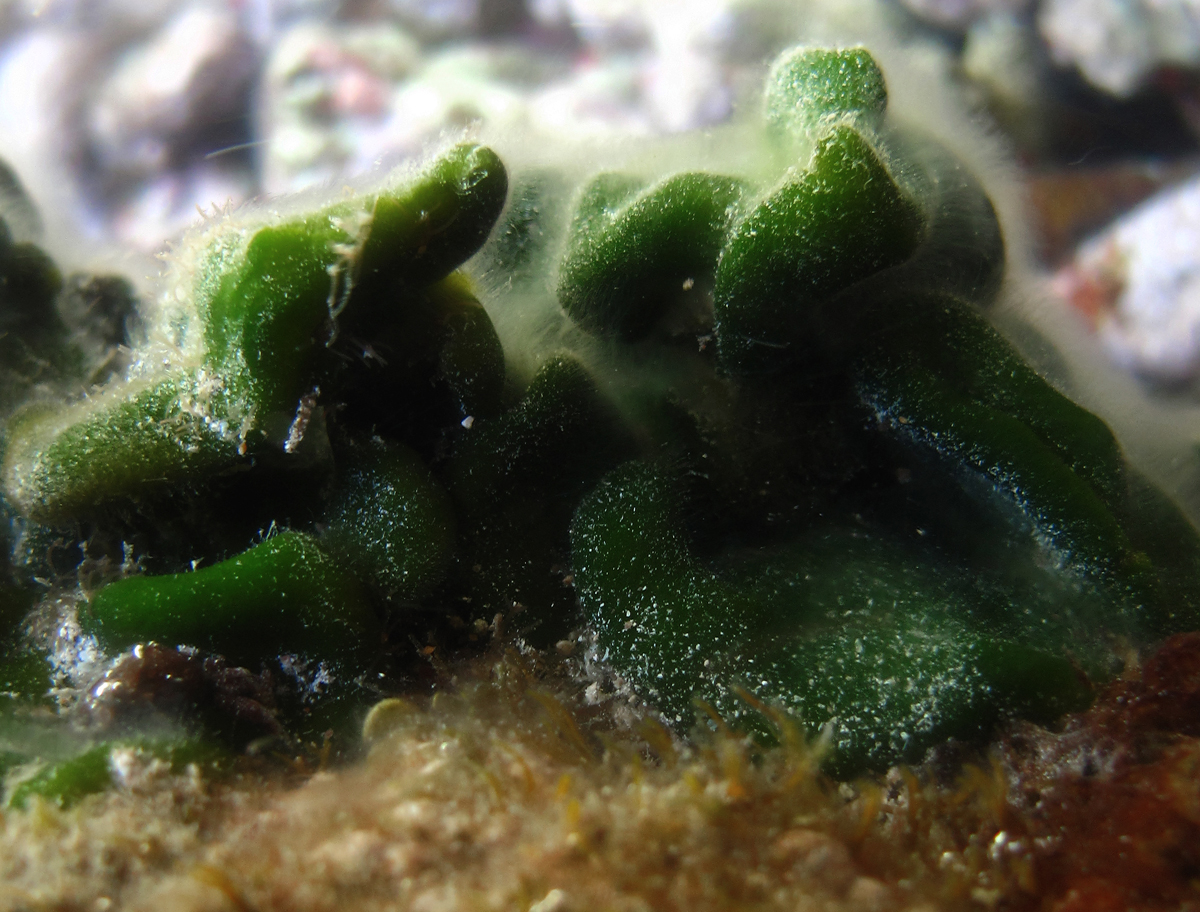
- Codium spongiosum in a lagoon on Réunion

Scientific classification
- Kingdom: Plantae
- Division: Chlorophyta
- Class: Ulvophyceae
- Order: Bryopsidales
- Family: Codiaceae
- Genus: Codium
- Species: C. spongiosum

Binomial name
- Codium spongiosum Harv.

= Codium spongiosum =

Species of seaweed

Codium spongiosum is a species of seaweed in the family Codiaceae.

The light-green thallus has an applanate-to-pulvinate habit and is usually around 10 to 25 cm (3.9 to 9.8 in) across and 20 mm (0.8 in) thick. It has irregular lobes and moderately firm while alive, becoming more spongy once dead. The utricles form in large clusters and are 2 to 6 mm (0.079 to 0.236 in) long and coated in many hairs.

The species is similar to Codium lucasii, which adheres more tightly to rock surfaces.

It is epilithic in the subtidal and intertidal zones. Mostly situated in calmer waters, from the low tide mark to several metres depth. It is often found in warmer waters but has a scattered distribution in colder waters.

The species was first formally described by the botanist William Henry Harvey in 1855 in Some Accounts of the Marine Botany of the Colony of Western Australia, published in the Transactions of the Royal Irish Academy. The type specimen was collected from King George Sound along the south coast of Western Australia.

In Western Australia, it is found along the coast in the Kimberley and as far south as the Recherche Archipelago. It is also found along the South Australian coasts on the Eyre Peninsula, Yorke Peninsula, Kangaroo Island, and Fleurieu Peninsula. It is common in all tropical and subtropical waters.
