= List of Chromista by conservation status =

- Extinct in the wild (EW): 0 species
- Critically endangered (CR): 4 species
- Endangered (EN): 1 species
- Vulnerable (VU): 1 species
- Near threatened (NT): 0 species
- Least concern (LC): 0 species
- Data deficient (DD): 9 species
Species in Chromista (IUCN, 2021-2)
- 15 extant species have been evaluated
- 6 of those are fully assessed (Note: excludes data deficient evaluations.)
- 0 are not threatened at present (Note: NT and LC.)
- 6 to 15 are threatened (Note: Threatened comprises CR, EN and VU. Upper estimate additionally includes DD.)
- 0 to 4 are extinct or extinct in the wild:
  - 0 extinct (EX) species
  - 0 extinct in the wild (EW)
  - 4 possibly extinct [CR(PE)]
  - 0 possibly extinct in the wild [CR(PEW)]

As of September 2021, the International Union for Conservation of Nature (IUCN) has evaluated the conservation status of 15 species within Chromista. The IUCN has not evaluated any protist species other than those in Phaeophyceae. No Chromista subspecies or subpopulations have been evaluated. No evaluated Chromista species are confirmed to be extinct, but four are tagged as possibly extinct.

As of 2005 the New Zealand Threat Classification System has evaluated 38 species of macroalgae as Threatened and 23 as Data Deficient. Some of these species are only of concern nationally.

== IUCN evaluations ==
=== Critically Endangered (possibly extinct) ===
- Bifurcaria galapagensis - Galapagos stringweed
- Desmarestia tropica - tropical acidweed
- Dictyota galapagensis
- Spatoglossum schmittii

=== Endangered ===
- Sargassum setifolium - string sargassum

=== Vulnerable ===
- Eisenia galapagensis - Galapagos kelp

=== Data Deficient ===
All are brown algae (Phaeophyceae):

- Of the Dictyotaceae,
  - Dictyopteris diaphana
  - Dictyota major
  - Padina concrescens
  - Spatoglossum ecuadoreanum
- Of the Chordariaceae,
  - Zosterocarpus abyssicola
- Of the Sargassaceae,
  - Sargassum albemarlense
  - Sargassum galapagense
  - Sargassum templetonii
- Of the Sporochnaceae,
  - Sporochnus rostratus

== NZTCS evaluations ==

- Extinct: 0 species (0.0%)
- Nationally Critical: 1 species (1.7%)
- Range Restricted: 37 species (61.7%)
- Not Threatened: 0 species (0.0%)
- Data Deficient: 22 species (36.7%)
Species of Algae (NZTCS, 2005)
- 61 extant species have been assessed
- 0 are Introduced and Naturalised
- 61 are Native (not Introduced and Naturalised)
  - 22 are Not Evaluated or Data Deficient
  - 38 are Evaluated
    - 0 of those Evaluated are Not Threatened
    - 37 of those Evaluated are At Risk
      - 37 of those At Risk are Range Restricted
    - 1 of those Evaluated are Threatened
      - 1 of those Threatened are Nationally Critical
    - 0 of those Evaluated are Extinct

=== Nationally Critical ===
- Dione arcuata - One Location

=== Range Restricted ===
- Caulerpa racemosa - Secure Overseas
- Caulerpa sertulariodes - Secure Overseas, One Location
- Caulerpa webbiana - Secure Overseas, One Location
- Chlidophyllon kaspar - One Location
- Chordariopsis capensis - Data Poor, Secure Overseas
- Chrysymenia? polydactyla - Data Poor, One Location
- Codium geppiorum - Secure Overseas, One Location
- Curdiea balthazar - One Location
- Dichotomaria marginata - Secure Overseas, One Location
- Durvillaea sp. Antipodes WELT A17080 - One Location
- Durvillaea chathamensis - One Location
- Galaxaura cohaerens - One Location
- Galaxaura filamentosa - One Location
- Galaxaura rugosa - One Location
- Ganonema farinosa - One Location
- Gelidium allanii - Threatened Overseas
- “Gelidium” ceramoides
- Gelidium longipes - One Location
- Gigartina sp. Bounty Is. - One Location
- Gigartina dilatata -
- Gigartina grandifida - One Location
- Gigartina sp. Three Kings - One Location
- Landsburgia ilicifolia - Data Poor, One Location
- Landsburgia myricifolia - One Location
- Lessonia adamsiae - One Location
- Lessonia brevifolia -
- Lessonia tholiformis - One Location
- Marginariella parsonsii
- Palmophyllum umbracola
- Perisporochnus regalis - One Location
- Predaea sp. - One Location
- Psilosiphon scoparium - Threatened Overseas
- Pterocladia lindaueri - One Location
- Pyrophyllon cameronii - One Location
- Sargassum johnsonii - One Location
- Sonderopelta coriacea - Secure Overseas, One Location
- Tricleocarpa cylindrica - Secure Overseas, One Location

=== Data Deficient ===
- Acrochaete endostraca
- Acrochaetium leptonemioides - One Location
- Acrochaetium neozeelandicum - One Location
- Bangia spp.
- Caulerpa fastigiata
- Cephalocystis furcellata
- Champiocolax sp.
- Codium perriniae
- Codium platyclados - Threatened? Overseas
- Cutleria mollis
- Entocladia spp.
- Epicladia testarum
- Erythrotrichia bangioides - One Location
- Erythrotrichia hunterae - One Location
- Giraudyopsis stellifera - Secure Overseas
- Nemacystus novae-zelandiae
- Ochlochaete hystrix
- Ovillaria catenata
- Porphyra spp.
- Porphyridium purpuream - Secure Overseas
- Pseudobryopsis planktonica - One Location
- Sebdenia lindaueri - One Location
- Syncoryne reinkei

== See also ==
- List of fungi by conservation status
