= Codium bulbopilum =

Scientific classification
- Clade: Viridiplantae
- Division: Chlorophyta
- Class: Ulvophyceae
- Order: Bryopsidales
- Family: Codiaceae
- Genus: Codium
- Species: C. bulbopilum

Binomial name
- Codium bulbopilum Setch.

Species of seaweed

Codium bulbopilum is a species of seaweed in the Codiaceae family.

The species is found along the coast of Western Australia, Norfolk Island and Lord Howe Island. It is found around Pacific Islands including American Samoa and Fiji.
