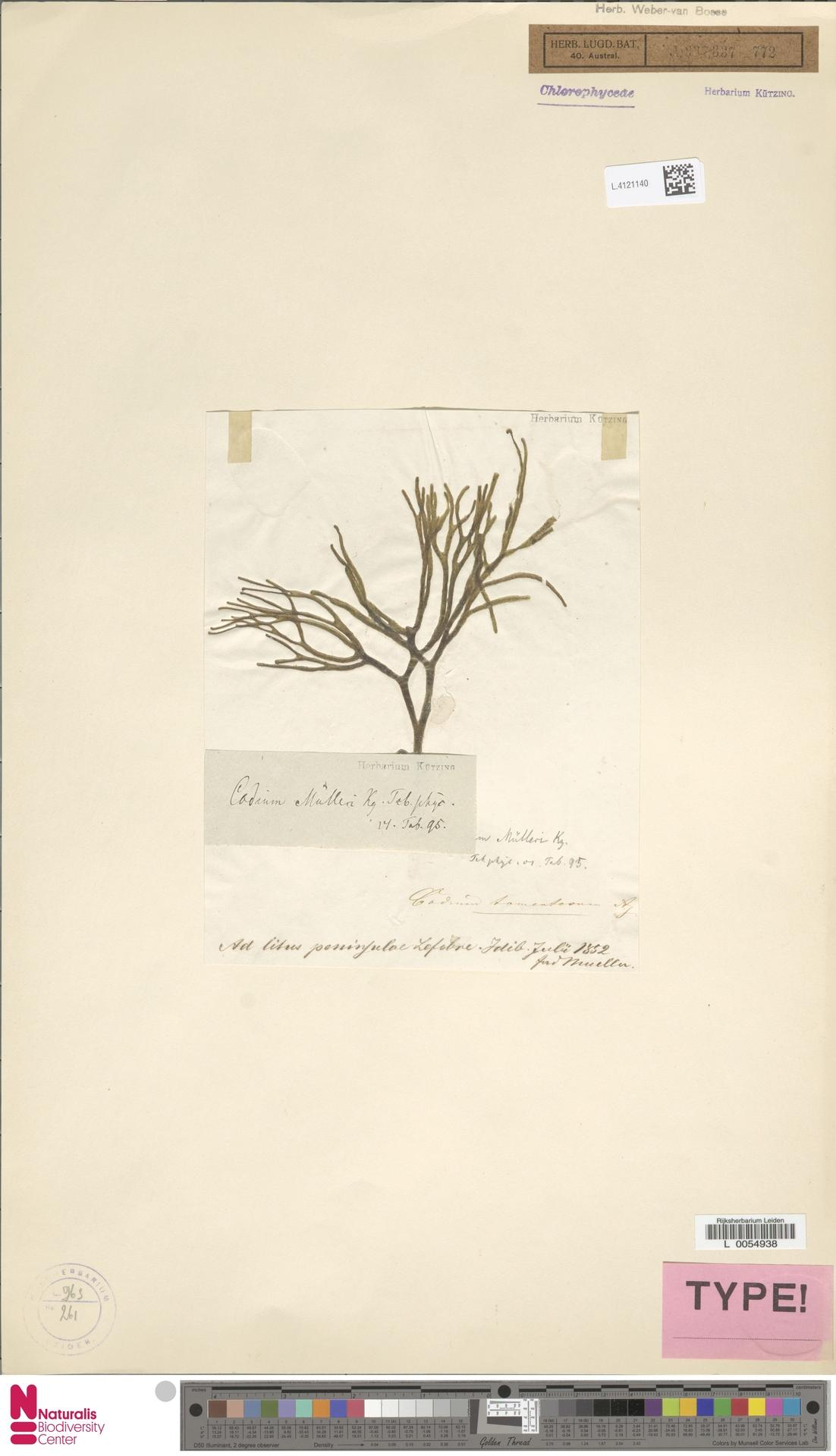
- herbarium sheet of the type specimen of Codium muelleri

Scientific classification
- Clade: Viridiplantae
- Division: Chlorophyta
- Class: Ulvophyceae
- Order: Bryopsidales
- Family: Codiaceae
- Genus: Codium
- Species: C. muelleri

Binomial name
- Codium muelleri Kütz.

= Codium muelleri =

Species of seaweed

Codium muelleri is a species of seaweed in the Codiaceae family.

The firm medium green erect thallus is usually around 25 centimetres (9.84 in) in height with repeatedly dichotomous branches.

It is found in sublittoral zones to a depth of 12 metres (39 ft) in rough to moderate water coasts.

In Western Australia is found along the coast in the Mid West region extending along the south coast and along as far as the east coast of Victoria.
