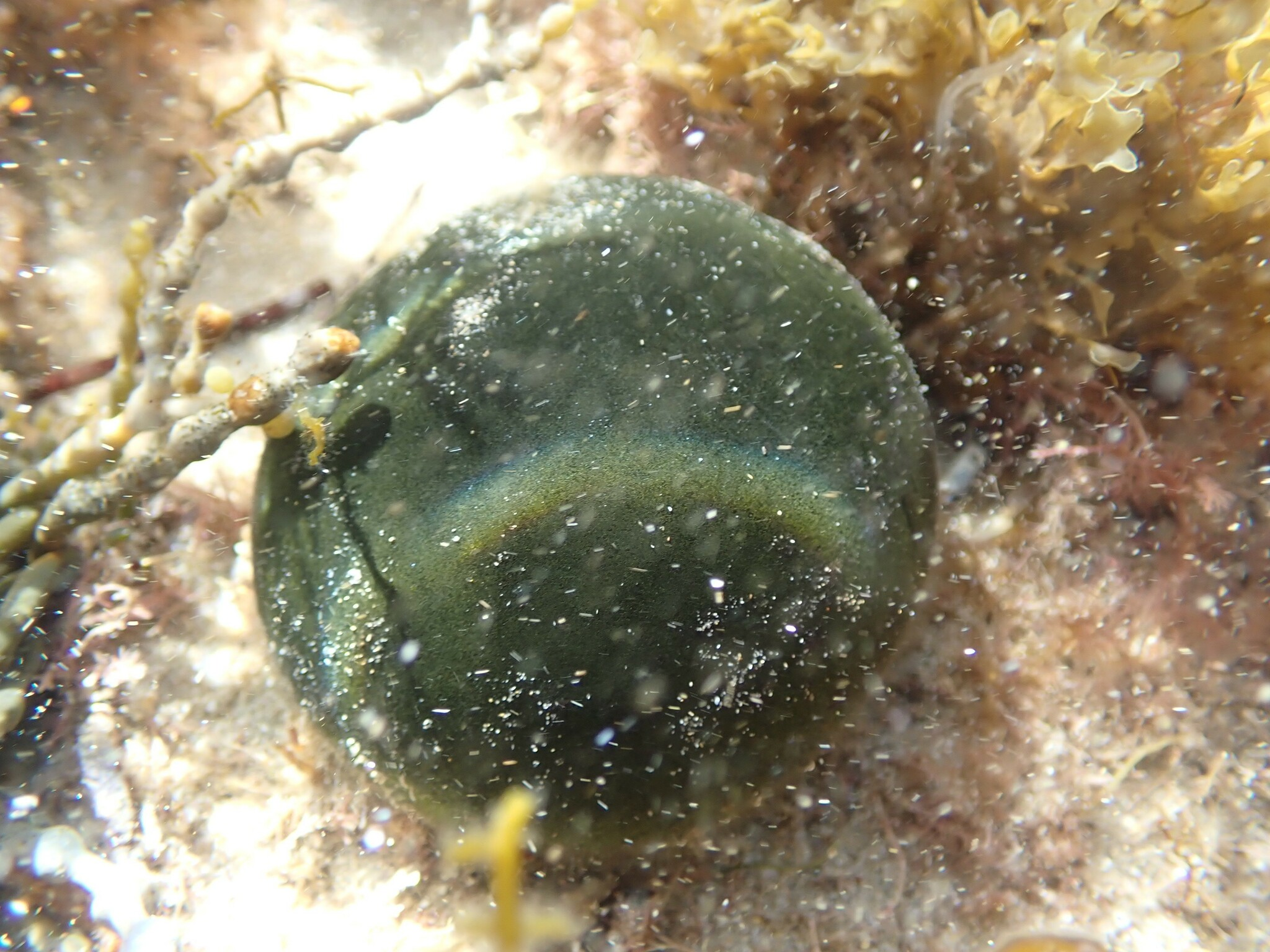

Scientific classification
- Clade: Viridiplantae
- Division: Chlorophyta
- Class: Ulvophyceae
- Order: Bryopsidales
- Family: Codiaceae
- Genus: Codium
- Species: C. pomoides

Binomial name
- Codium pomoides J.Agardh

= Codium pomoides =

Species of seaweed

Codium pomoides is a species of seaweed in the Codiaceae family.

The firm dark green thallus and has a globose habit and is usually around 12 centimetres (4.7 in) across.

It is found at the low tide up to 20 metres (66 ft) in depth along rough to moderate water coasts.

In Western Australia is found along the coast in the Goldfields-Esperance region around the Recherche Archipelago extending along the south coast as far as Victoria and the north coast of Tasmania.
