= Codium silvae =

Scientific classification
- Clade: Viridiplantae
- Division: Chlorophyta
- Class: Ulvophyceae
- Order: Bryopsidales
- Family: Codiaceae
- Genus: Codium
- Species: C. silvae

Binomial name
- Codium silvae Womersley

Species of seaweed

Codium silvae is a species of seaweed in the Codiaceae family.

The medium green erect thallus usually grows to around 30 centimetres (11.81 in) in height and terete branches.

In Western Australia is found along the coast in the Goldfields-Esperance region from two areas; one near Esperance and the other near Eucla.
