= Codium laminarioides =

Scientific classification
- Clade: Viridiplantae
- Division: Chlorophyta
- Class: Ulvophyceae
- Order: Bryopsidales
- Family: Codiaceae
- Genus: Codium
- Species: C. laminarioides

Binomial name
- Codium laminarioides Harv.

Species of seaweed

Codium laminarioides is a species of seaweed in the Codiaceae family.

The medium green thallus has a with a short and terete stipe that is approximately 12 millimetres (0.47 in) in length. This expands to a flat frond which is 80 centimetres (31 in) broad and 40 centimetres (16 in) long and 1.5 to 2 millimetres (0.06 to 0.08 in) thick.

It is usually found in deep water to around 30 metres (98 ft) in depth.

In Western Australia is found along the coast in Mid West down the west coast and then along the south coast as far as South Australia.
