= Codium perriniae =

Scientific classification
- Clade: Viridiplantae
- Division: Chlorophyta
- Class: Ulvophyceae
- Order: Bryopsidales
- Family: Codiaceae
- Genus: Codium
- Species: C. perriniae

Binomial name
- Codium perriniae A.H.S.Lucas

Species of seaweed

Codium perriniae is a species of seaweed in the Codiaceae family.

The firm medium green thallus is usually around 2 centimetres (0.79 in) tall and 2 to 12 centimetres (0.8 to 4.7 in) across.

It is found in the upper sublittoral zone in rock pools and rock shelves rough to moderate water coasts up to 32 metres (105 ft) in depth.

In Western Australia is found along the coast in the Mid West regions extending along the south coast as far as Victoria and the north coast of Tasmania.
