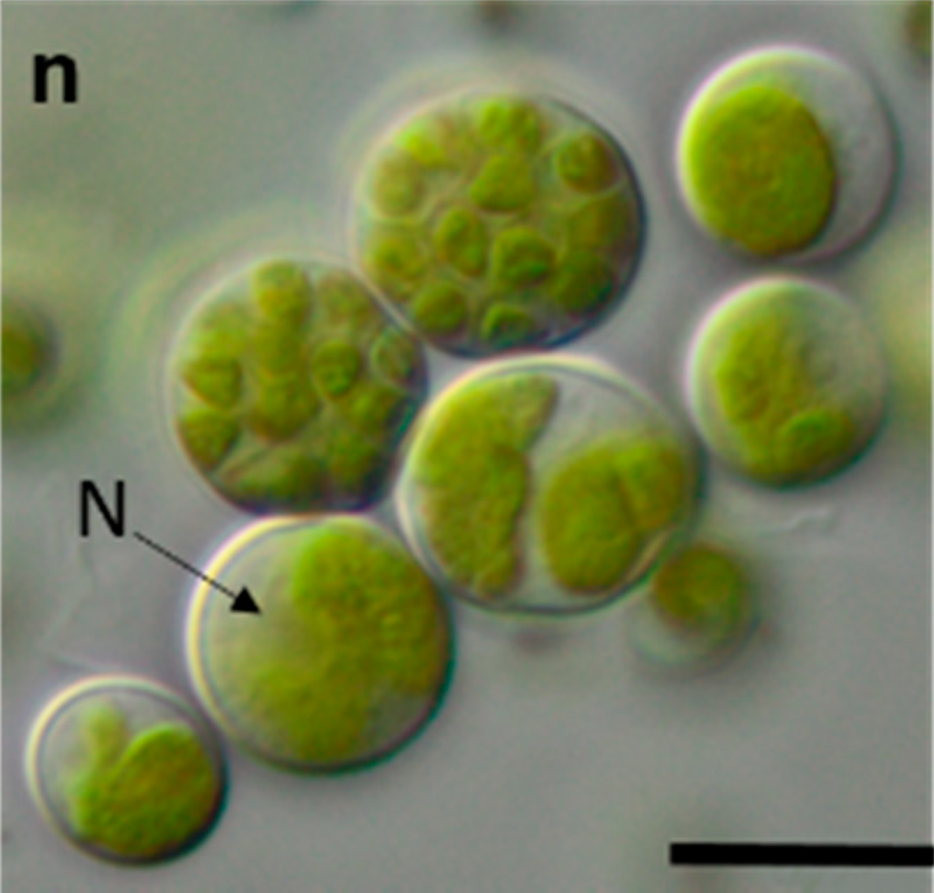
- Watanabea sp., arrow (N) shows nucleus. Scale bar = 10 μm.

Scientific classification
- Kingdom: Plantae
- Division: Chlorophyta
- Class: Trebouxiophyceae
- Order: Watanabeales
- Family: Watanabeaceae
- Genus: Watanabea; N.Hanagata, I.Karube, M.Chihara & P.C.Silva

Type species
- Watanabea reniformis N.Hanagata, I.Karube, Chihara & P.C.Silva

Species
- Watanabea acidophila; Watanabea acidotolerans; Watanabea alpicola; Watanabea borysthenica; Watanabea lichenicola; Watanabea patagonica; Watanabea reniformis; Watanabea sichuanensis

= Watanabea =

Genus of algae

Watanabea is a genus of microscopic green algae in the family Watanabeaceae. It is widespread in terrestrial and freshwater habitats, including as a photobiont within lichens, but is apparently rare.

Watanabea consists of single, coccoid cells, which are cylindrical to ellipsoid when young, becoming subspherical when mature. Cells contain a single chloroplast, which may or may not be lobed, and may have or lack a pyrenoid. Cells are surrounded by a thin, smooth cell wall. Watanabea reproduces asexually by autospores; a cell may form one of two different types of autospores, either E-form (ellipsoidal, smaller and more numerous) or S-form (subspherical, larger and fewer).

Watanabea is the type genus of the family Watanabeaceae, which in turn is the only family in the order Watanabeales. Like Watanabea, members of the family consist mostly of coccoid cells and show a high amount of cryptic diversity. A key morphological feature in this group is the presence of unequally sized autospores.
