= Arabicodium =

Scientific classification
- Clade: Viridiplantae
- Division: Chlorophyta
- Class: Ulvophyceae
- Order: Bryopsidales
- Family: Codiaceae
- Genus: †Arabicodium; G.F. Elliott 1957

Species
- Arabicodium bicazense; Arabicodium hansii

Genus of algae

Arabicodium is a fossil genus of green algae in the family Codiaceae.
