= Geppella =

Scientific classification
- Kingdom: Plantae
- Division: Chlorophyta
- Class: Ulvophyceae
- Order: Bryopsidales
- Family: Codiaceae
- Genus: Geppella; Børgesen, 1940

Type species
- Geppella mortensenii Børgesen, 1940

Species
- Geppella prolifera

Genus of algae

Geppella is a genus of green algae in the family Codiaceae.

The genus name of Geppella is in honour of Anthony Gepp (1862–1955), who was a British botanist (Algology, Bryology and Pteridology) and cryptogam researcher.

The genus was circumscribed by Frederik Christian Emil Børgesen in Kongl. Danske Vidensk. Selsk. Biol. Medd. Vol.15 (Issue 4) on page 55 in 1940.
