= Ann Vickers =

Ann Vickers refers to:

- Ann Vickers (novel), a 1933 novel by Sinclair Lewis
- Ann Vickers (film), a 1933 film adaption of the novel directed by John Cromwell

== See also ==
- Anna Vickers, a phycologist in the late 19th and early 20th century
