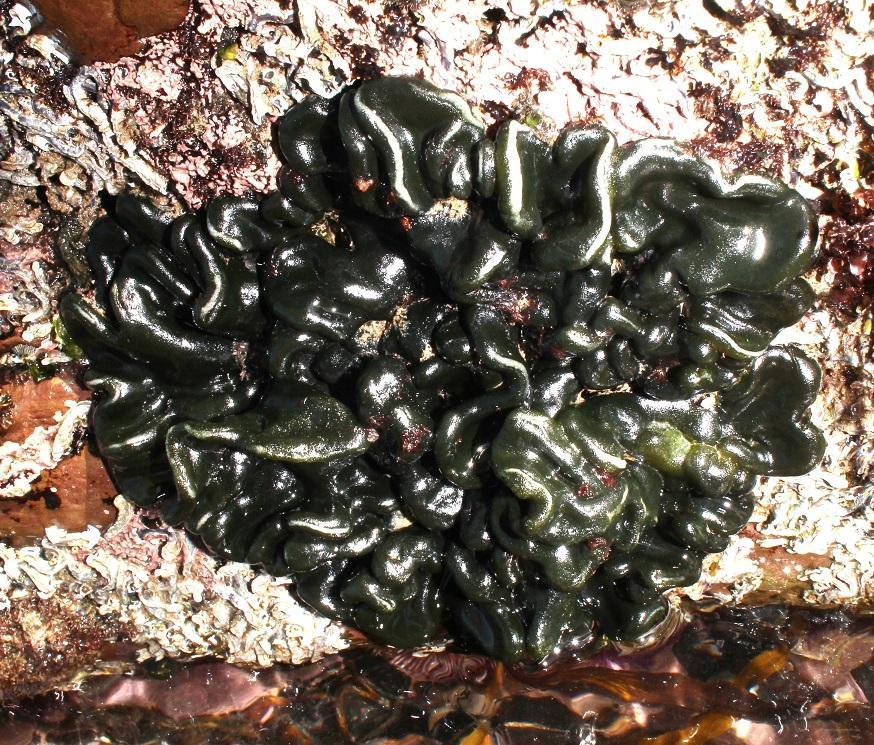

Scientific classification
- Kingdom: Plantae
- Division: Chlorophyta
- Class: Ulvophyceae
- Order: Bryopsidales
- Family: Codiaceae
- Genus: Codium
- Species: C. lucasii

Binomial name
- Codium lucasii Setch.

= Codium lucasii =

Species of seaweed

Codium lucasii is a species of seaweed in the family Codiaceae.

The firm dark green applanate thallus is usually around 1 cm (0.39 in) thick and 15 cm (5.9 in) wide.

It is found in the lower eulittoral and upper sublittoral zone in rough to moderate water coasts.

In Western Australia it is found along the coast in the Gascoyne and Mid West regions extending along the south coast and along the east coast of Queensland and the northern coast of Tasmania.
