= Pseudoudoteaceae =

Scientific classification
- Domain: Eukaryota
- Supergroup: Archaeplastida
- Clade: Viridiplantae
- Division: Chlorophyta
- Class: Ulvophyceae
- Order: Bryopsidales
- Family: †Pseudoudoteaceae

Genera
- †Hydraea; †Pseudoudotea

Family of algae

Pseudoudoteaceae is a fossil family of green algae in the order Bryopsidales. It contains four species across two genera.
