= Codium geppiorum =

Scientific classification
- Clade: Viridiplantae
- Division: Chlorophyta
- Class: Ulvophyceae
- Order: Bryopsidales
- Family: Codiaceae
- Genus: Codium
- Species: C. geppiorum

Binomial name
- Codium geppiorum O.C.Schmidt

Species of seaweed

Codium geppiorum is a species of seaweed in the Codiaceae family.

The procumbent and densely branched thallus forms patches that are about 8 centimetres (3.1 in) wide that are attached to sandy substrates with tufts of rhizoids.

It epilithic and is found in the intertidal and subtidal zones.

In Western Australia is found along the coast in Kimberley and Pilbara regions. It is also widespread throughout the Indian and Pacific Oceans.
