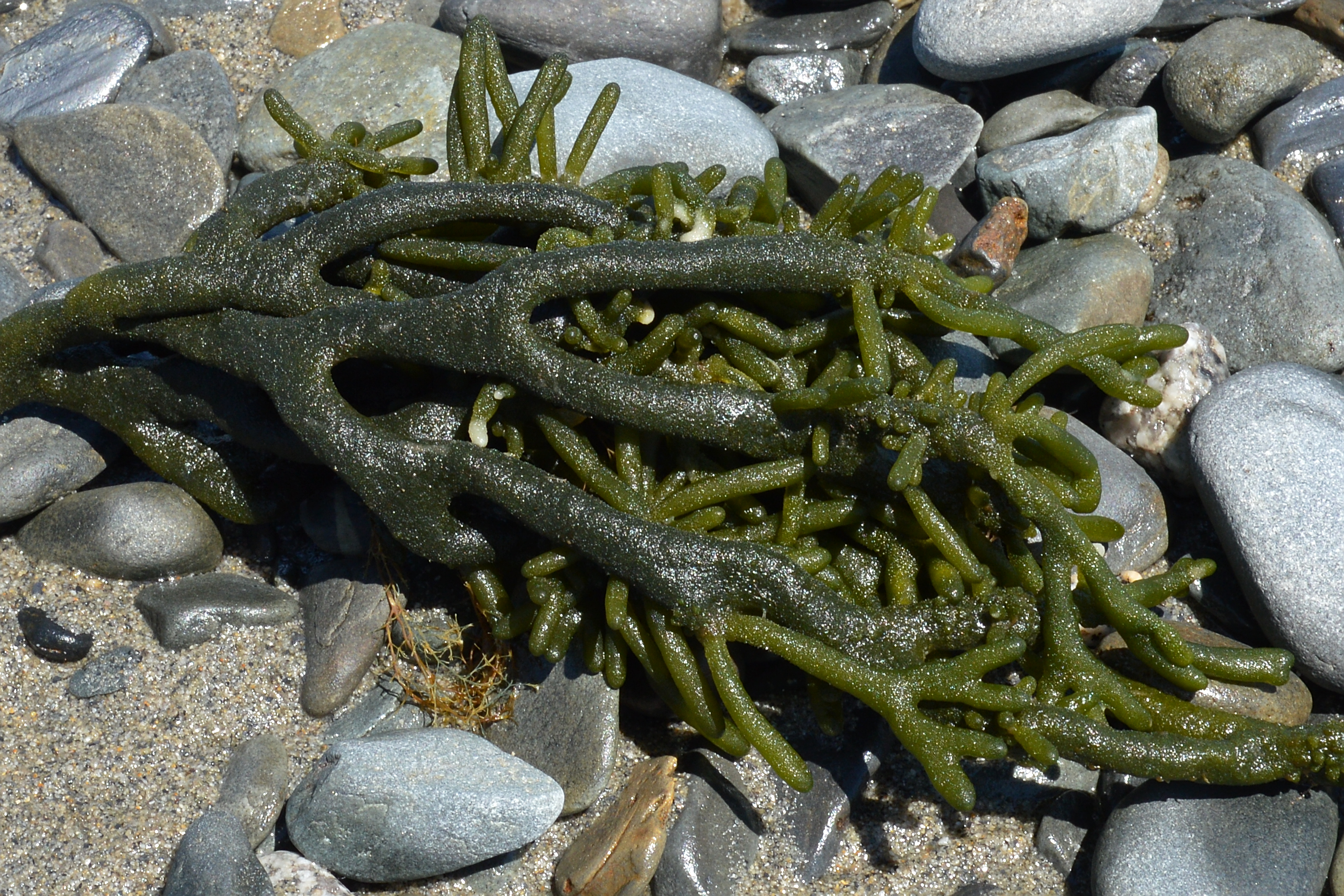

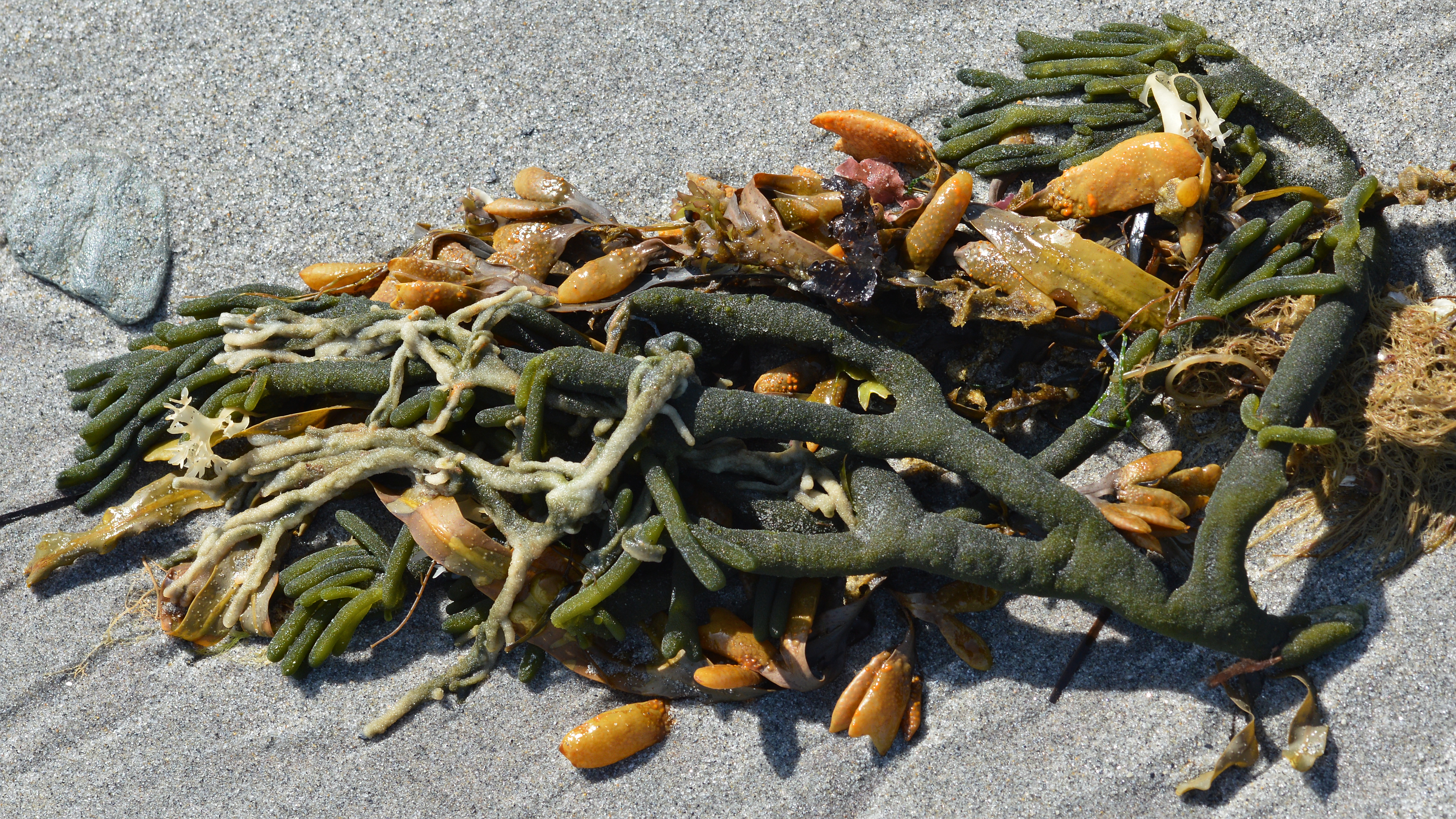
- Codium fragile in Nova Scotia, Canada

Scientific classification
- Kingdom: Plantae
- Division: Chlorophyta
- Class: Ulvophyceae
- Order: Bryopsidales
- Family: Codiaceae
- Genus: Codium
- Species: C. fragile

Binomial name
- Codium fragile (Suringar) Hariot, 1889

= Codium fragile =

Species of alga

Codium fragile, known commonly as green sea fingers, dead man's fingers, felty fingers, forked felt-alga, stag seaweed, sponge seaweed, green sponge, green fleece, sea staghorn, and oyster thief, is a species of seaweed in the family Codiaceae. It originates in the Pacific Ocean near Japan and has become an invasive species on the coasts of the Northern Atlantic Ocean.

== Description ==
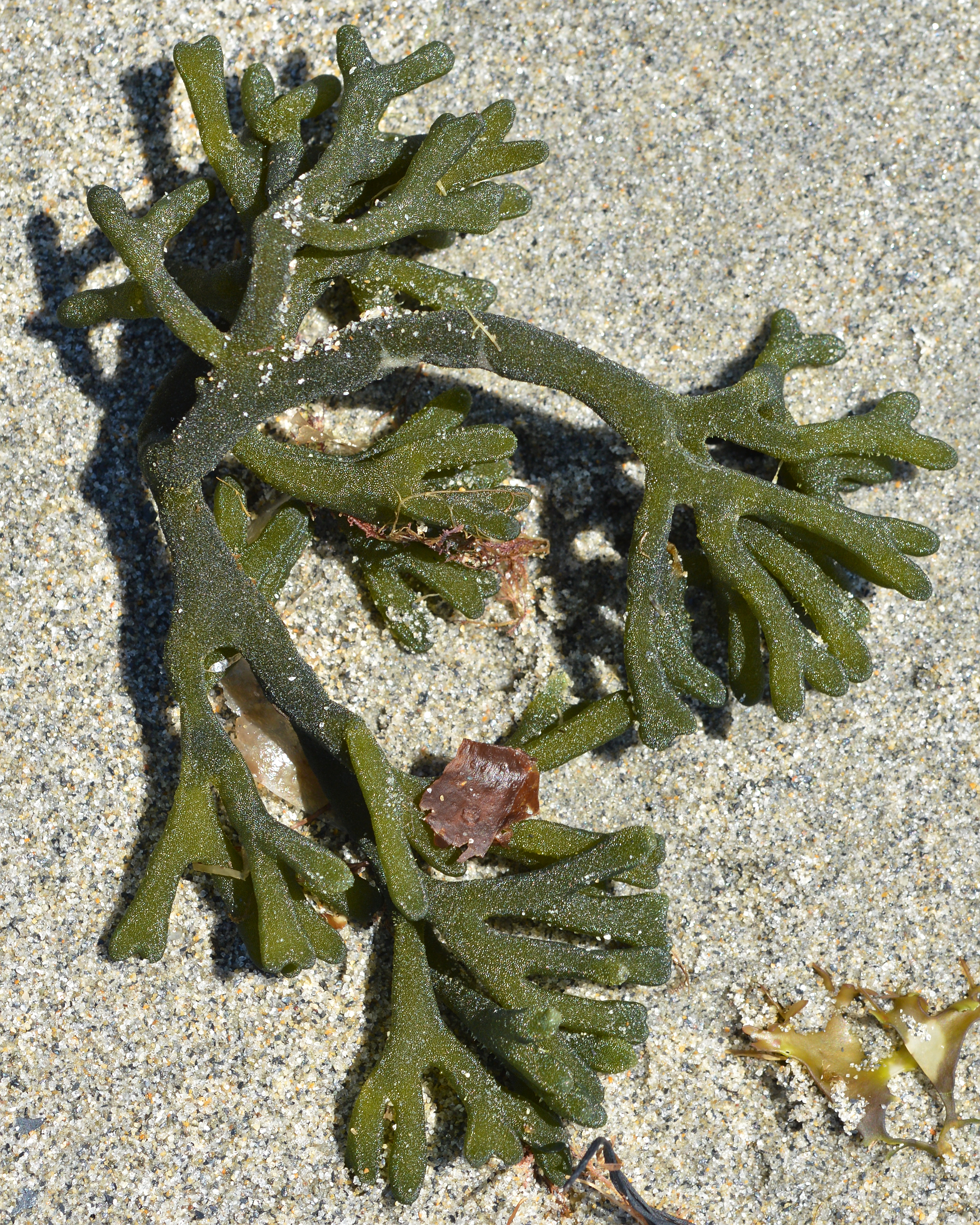
From Nova Scotia

This siphonous green alga is of two subspecies in Ireland and Great Britain. They are similar, both are dark green in color. It forms long erect finger-like fronds. These grow to 40 cm or more long branching dichotomously. The cortex of the branches is formed by closely packed utricles, these are small cylindrical club-shaped structures formed from a single cell up to 1200 μm (micrometres) long. The rounded tips of these closely packed utricles give the frond a velvety texture. The fronds hang down from rocks during low tide, hence the nickname "dead man's fingers". The "fingers" are branches up to a centimeter wide and sometimes over 30 centimeters long.

Codium fragile occurs in the low intertidal zone, and subtidal on high-energy beaches.

It has no gametophyte stage, and male and female gametes are both produced on separate plants.

== Subspecies ==
Subspecies of C. fragile can only be distinguished microscopically.

=== Codium fragile subsp. atlanticum ===
This subspecies can be distinguished by the mucron or tip of the utricles. In this subspecies the mucron is short, no more than 20 μm long.

The first European record of Codium fragile subsp. atlanticum is known to have arrived in the southwest of Ireland around 1808. From there it may have spread by rafting or floating in the sea. Approximately 30 years later, it was found in Scotland. It is thought to have originally come from the Pacific Ocean near Japan.

Since 1840, when it was first discovered in Scotland, it has spread the entire length of Britain, including Shetland. Between 1949 and 1955 it is known to have spread between Berwick-upon-Tweed and St. Andrews, Fife, a distance of 80 km. Populations of this algae occur mostly in northern Britain. Elsewhere in Europe it is found in several places, including Norway, Netherlands, France, Spain and the Azores.

This species displaces the native Codium tomentosum.

Codium fragile subsp. atlanticum is used as food in the Far East.

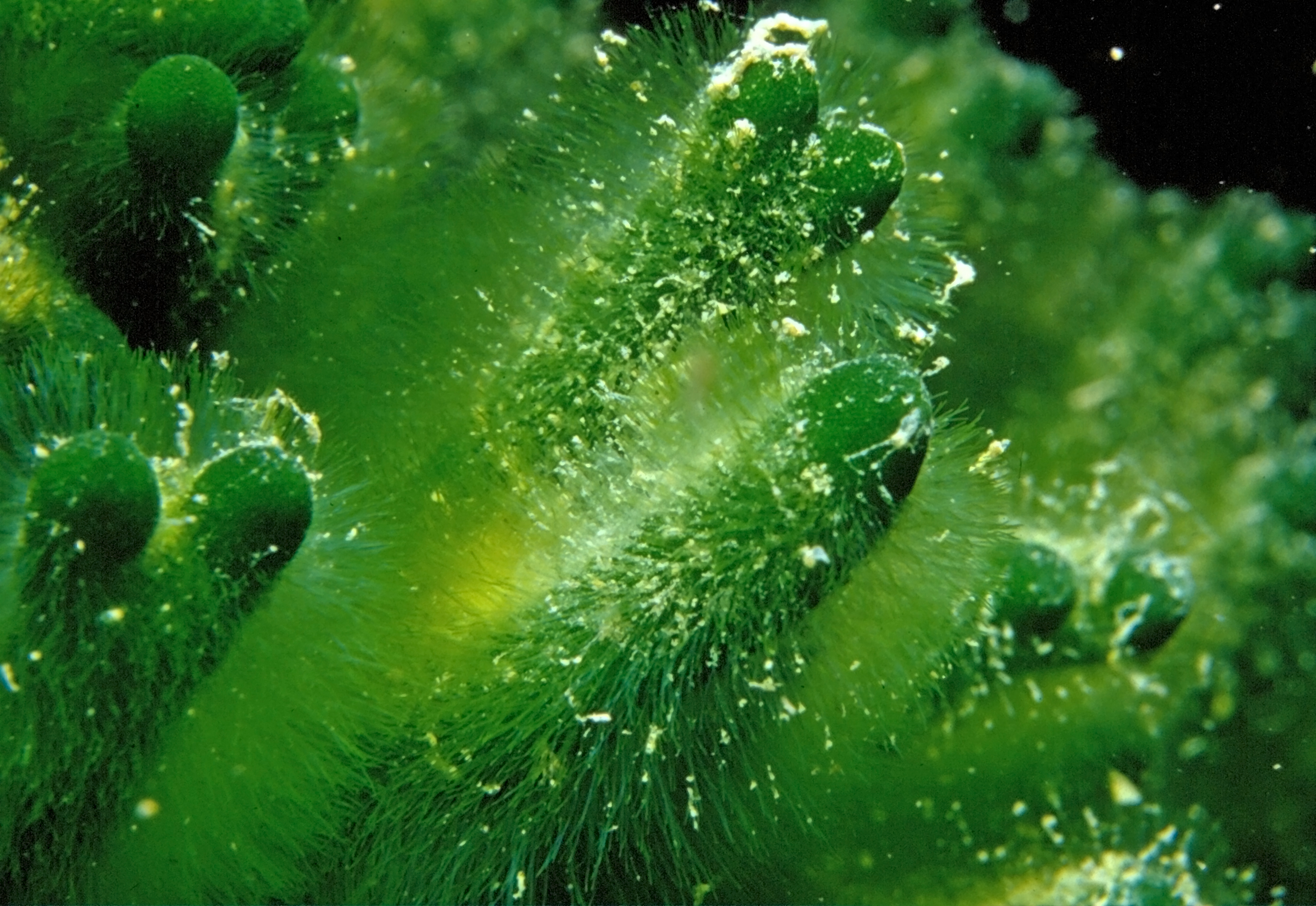
Close-up

=== Codium fragile subsp. tomentosoides ===
This subspecies is distinguished from C.fragile subsp. atlanticum by its very pointed mucron (the tip of the utricle) – up to μm 68 long.

The subspecies Codium fragile subsp. tomentosoides (syn. Codium mucronatum var. tomentosoides), occurs along nearly the whole coastline of the eastern United States, from the Gulf of St. Lawrence in Canada to North Carolina. It is a rapidly spreading invasive species. It originated in the Pacific Ocean around Japan, and was introduced into New York from Europe in 1957. Its presence was first recorded in 1964 in the Gulf of Maine at Boothbay. It is now recorded around Ireland. It has also been recorded from the Scilly Isles, the Channel Islands, and the south and west coasts of England and Scotland.

This is a dominant subspecies in the subtidal zone, attaching to almost any hard surface. This results in increased maintenance labor for aquaculturists and reduces the productivity of cultured marine life. In established shellfish beds, this species can become a nuisance; it may attach to shellfish and then float away, carrying the animals with it. This was the inspiration for the common name "oyster thief".

=== Codium fragile subsp. scandinavicum ===
This subspecies was introduced from Asiatic coasts of the Pacific to Norway, and to Denmark in 1919.

=== Codium fragile subsp. novae-zelandiae ===
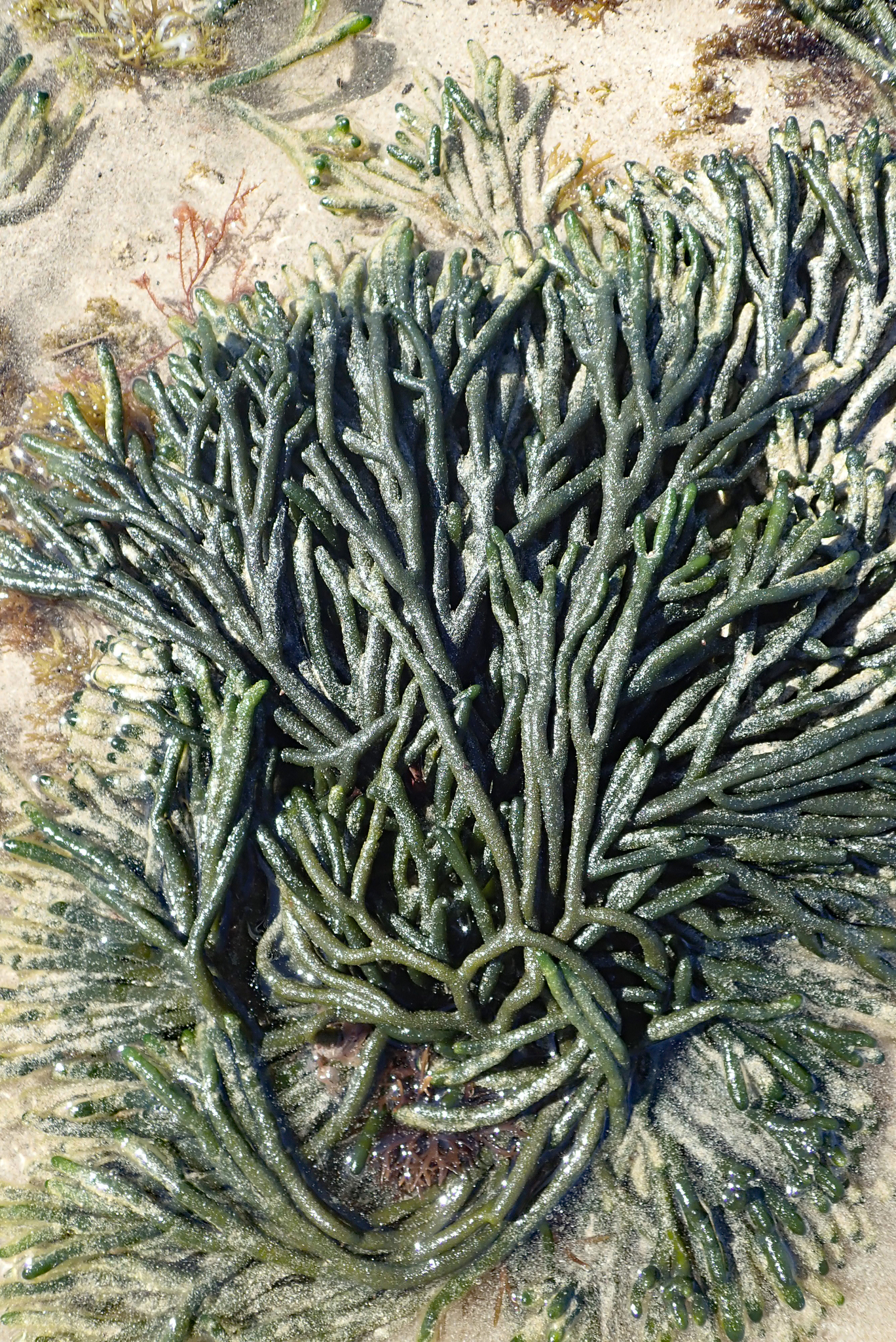
Codium fragile subsp. novae-zelandiae

This subspecies is found in the low intertidal to subtidal zones around New Zealand at the North Island, South Island, Chatham Islands, Stewart Island, Auckland Island, Campbell Island as well as around the Falkland Islands.
