= Anna Vickers =

British phycologist

- Born: June 28, 1852; Bordeaux
- Died: August 1, 1906 (aged 54); Roscoff
- Known for: algae of the Antilles and the Canary Islands
- Scientific career
- Fields: Phycology

Anna Vickers (28 June 1852 – 1 August 1906) was a marine algologist and plant collector known principally for her work on algae of the Antilles and the Canary Islands.

== Biography ==
Anna Vickers was born on 28 June 1852 in Bordeaux, France, though it is likely that her father was British. In 1879–80, she visited Australia and New Zealand with her family, traveling widely and becoming interested in the Maori language. In 1883 she published a monograph about these travels, Voyage en Australie et en Novelle-Zélande. Topics she touched on range from word derivations in the Maori language to the ferns and algae of south Australia. She illustrated the book with sketches from her own photographs.

She died on 1 August 1906 in Roscoff, France.

== Scientific work ==
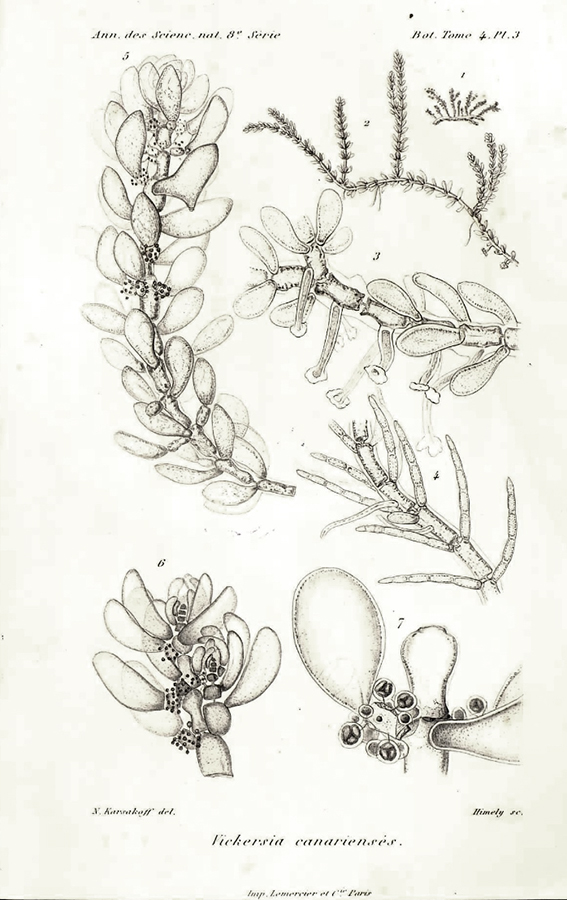
Vickersia canariensis (now Vickersia baccata) by N. Karsakoff, 1896.

Vickers carried out research into marine flora around Roscoff, Naples (Italy), Antibes (France), the Canary Islands, and the Antilles. She published major papers in French journals on the algae of the Canary islands and Barbados, reporting results of field work done in the Canaries in 1895–96 and in the West Indies in 1898–99 and 1902–03. Her work in the Canaries led to the identification of over 30 new species on the island of Gran Canaria alone, while her work in the Antilles led to descriptions of over two dozen new species.

When Vickers died at the age of 54, she left a planned book on Barbadian algae unfinished. It was completed by her colleague Mary Shaw and published posthumously in 1908 as Phycologia Barbadensis, with 93 plates of anatomical drawings by Vickers and other illustrations in color by a Mlle Trottet. It included descriptions of five new species.

Along the way, Vickers collected numerous specimens that went into the collection of the British Museum and the New York Botanical Garden as well as to other museums in Europe and the United States. Between 1898 and 1906 she edited the exsiccata Algues de la Barbade.

The standard author abbreviation Vickers is used to indicate this person as the author when citing a botanical name.

Vickers is commemorated in the name of the red algae genus Vickersia (Karsakoff, 1896) of the family Wrangeliaceae.
