= Paul Silva =

American botanist (1922–2014)

- Born: October 31, 1922; San Diego, California, U.S.
- Died: June 12, 2014 (aged 91); Berkeley, California, U.S.
- Education: University of California, Berkeley
- Known for: systematics of algae
- Partner: Lawrence Ray Heckard
- Scientific career
- Fields: phycology
- Workplaces: University of California, Berkeley
- Doctoral advisor: George F. Papenfuss

Paul Claude Silva (October 31, 1922 – June 12, 2014) was a phycologist, marine biologist, and algal taxonomist considered to be the world's leading expert in the chlorophyte green algal genus Codium. Silva was also an expert in botanical nomenclature and was an editor of the International Code of Botanical Nomenclature's Eighth through Sixteenth International Botanical Congresses.

== Biography ==
Silva completed his undergraduate degree at the University of Southern California, though his education was interrupted by World War II. He served in the US Navy on the USS Darby, participating in the Battle of Leyte Gulf. He attended Stanford University for his master's degree studying under Gilbert Morgan Smith, and University of California, Berkeley for his Ph.D. Silva later worked as a Research Botanist and Curator of Algae at the UCB herbarium. While at UC Berkeley, Silva met his life partner Lawrence Ray Heckard.

== Honours ==
He has been honoured in the naming of several taxa of algae. In 1999, Silvetia In the Fucaceae family) was published by botanists E.A.Serrão, T.O.Cho, S.M.Boo & Brawley. and then in 2002, Paulsilvella (in the Subfamily Lithophylloideae) was published by Woelk., Sartoni & Boddi.
