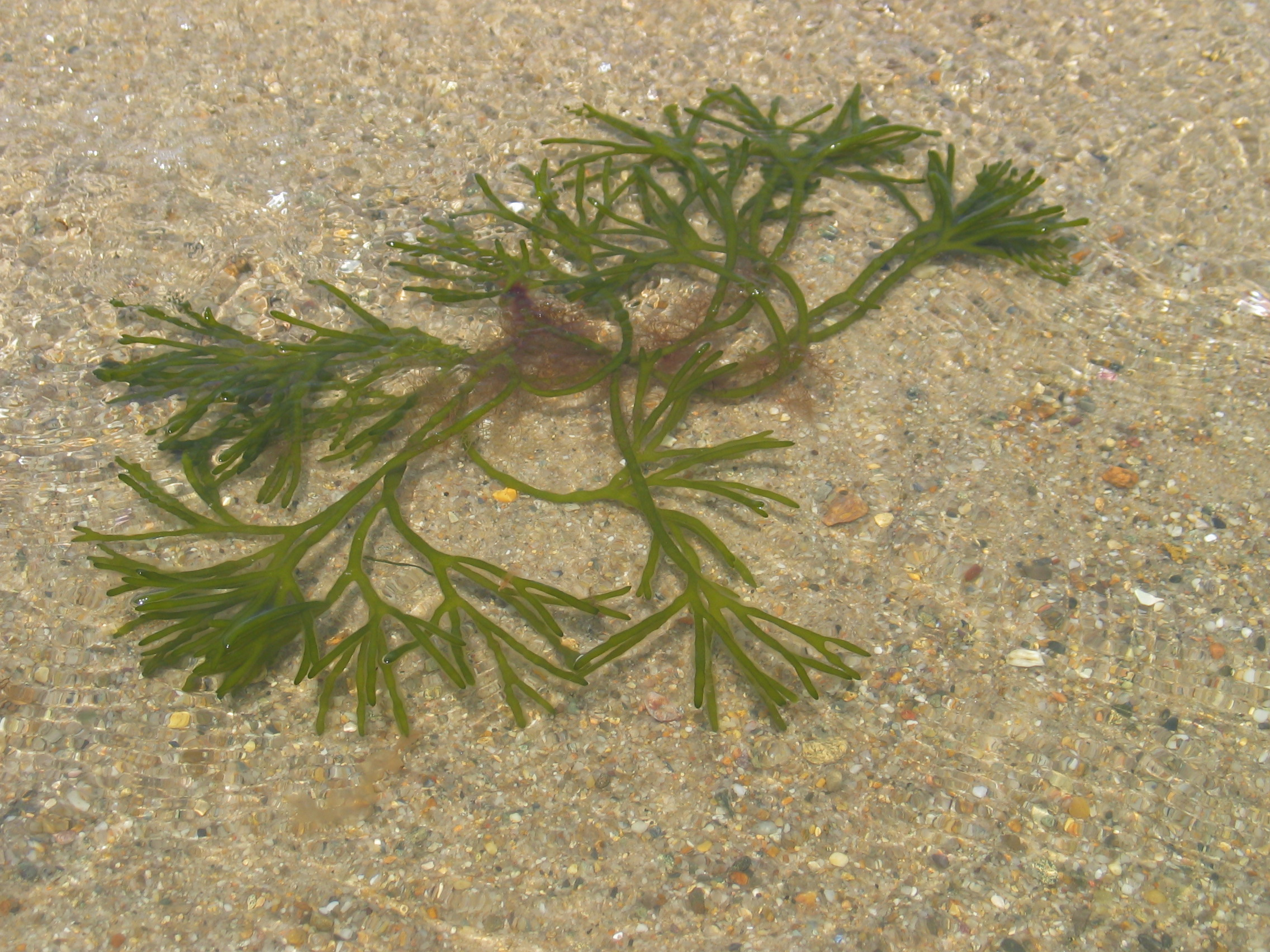
- Dead man's fingers (Codium fragile)

Scientific classification
- Kingdom: Plantae
- Division: Chlorophyta
- Class: Ulvophyceae
- Order: Bryopsidales
- Family: Codiaceae; Kützing, 1843

Genera
- See text

= Codiaceae =

Family of algae

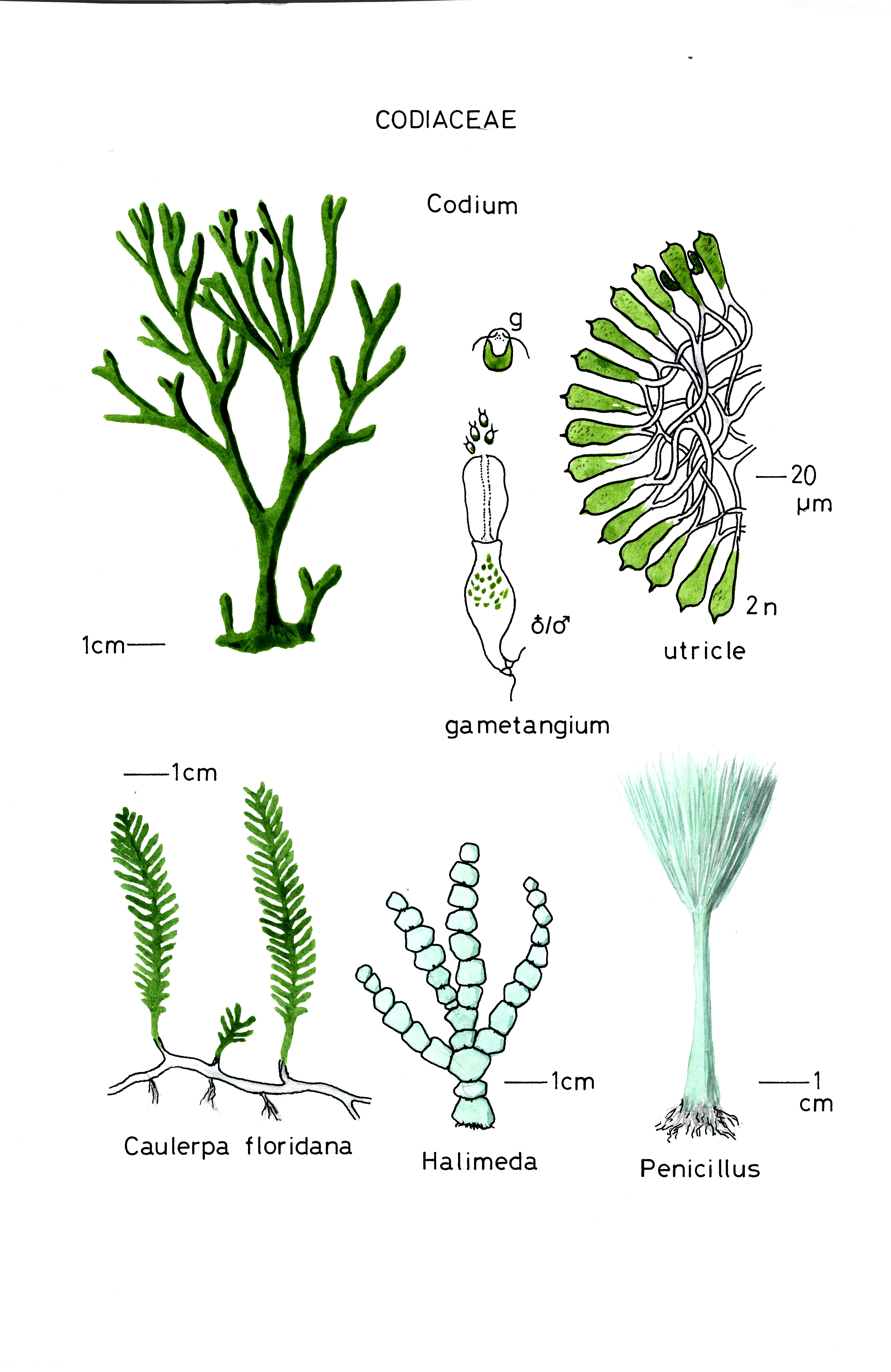
Illustration

Codiaceae is a family of green algae in the order Bryopsidales.

== Genera ==
As of 2025, Codiaceae contains the following genera:

- † Alpinium Dragastan
- † Aphroditicodium G.F.Elliott
- † Appeninocodium Dragastan ex Molinari & Guiry
- † Arabicodium G.F.Elliott
- † Atlasinium Dragastan
- † Bacinellacodium Dragastan
- † Bucurium Dragastan, Herbig & M.E.Popa
- † Canadiophycus L.G.Voronova & Drosdova
- † Carpathocodium Dragastan
- Codium Stackhouse
- † Cummingsella Mamet & A.Roux
- † Diversoporella M.B.Gnilovskaja
- † Egericodium E.Flügel, Velledits, Senowbari-Daryan & P.Riedel
- Geppella Børgesen
- † Globosiphonia Shuysky
- † Johnsonicodium Dragastan
- † Lanciculina Shuysky
- † Malakhovella Mamet & A.Roux
- † Nansenella Mamet & A.Roux
- † Palaeoporella Stolley
- † Praelitanaia Shuysky
- † Protocodium S.Chai, Aria & H.Hua
- † Radoicicinellopsis F.T.Banner, E.M.Finch & M.D.Simmons
- † Schirschovaea Molinari & Guiry
- † Scotlandella Dragastan
- † Shonabellia Retallack
- † Sinuatoporella M.B.Gnilovskaja
- † Succodium Konishi
- † Tethysicodium Dragastan
- † Thaiporella R.Endo
- † Vitinellopsis Vachard, Bucur & Munnecke
- † Vitivisus Molinari & Sánchez Ocharan

Synonyms and excluded genera:

- Acanthocodium
- Agardhia A.Cabrera, 1823, nom. illeg., currently regarded as a synonym of Codium.
- Lamarckia Olivi, 1792, nom. rejic., currently regarded as a synonym of Codium.
- Moniliaxes Kajimura, 1977, Taxonomic status: uncertain, requiring further investigation.
- Spongodium J.V.F.Lamouroux, 1813, Taxonomic status: uncertain, requiring further investigation.
