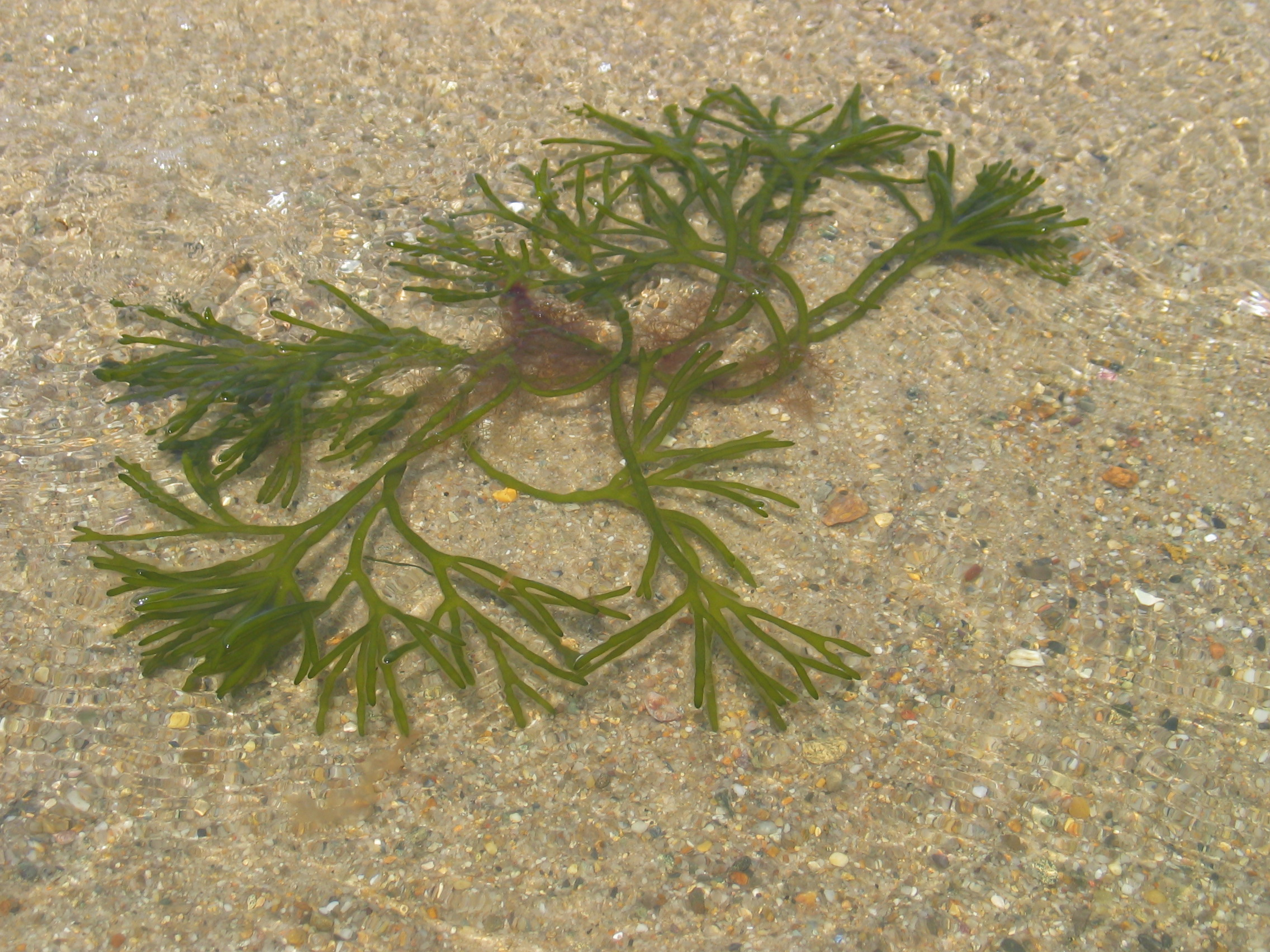
- Dead man's fingers (Codium fragile)

Scientific classification
- Domain: Eukaryota
- Supergroup: Archaeplastida
- Clade: Viridiplantae
- Division: Chlorophyta
- Class: Ulvophyceae
- Order: Bryopsidales; J.H. Schaffner

Families
- †Anchicodiaceae; †Aternasaceae; Bryopsidaceae; Caulerpaceae; Chaetosiphonaceae; Codiaceae; Derbesiaceae; Dichotomosiphonaceae; †Dimorphosiphonaceae; †Gymnocodiaceae; Halimedaceae (incl. Pseudocodiaceae, Rhipiliaceae, Udoteaceae); Ostreobiaceae; †Protohalimedaceae; Pseudobryopsidaceae; †Pseudoudoteaceae

Synonyms
- Caulerpales

= Bryopsidales =

Order of algae

Bryopsidales is an order of green algae, in the class Ulvophyceae. It is a diverse group of mostly marine macroalgae.

== Characteristics ==
The thallus is filamentous, highly branched, and may be packed into a mass. It is coenocytic, having multi-nucleate cells consisting of cytoplasm contained within a cylindrical cell wall. There are no septae, and the many discoid chloroplasts, nuclei and other organelles are free to move through the organism. The whole organism may consist of a single cell; in the genus Caulerpa, this single cell may be several metres across. In the genus Halimeda, whole seabed meadows may consist of an individual, single-celled organism connected by filamentous threads running through the substrate.

== Reproduction ==
Propagation is normally vegetative from small fragments which grow into new individuals. Under certain conditions, sexual reproduction occurs in a process called holocarpy. Almost all of the cytoplasm in the thallus is converted into biflagellate gametes, which are discharged into the sea through papillae. After fertilisation, the zygote becomes a protonema and this, in turn, develops into a new thallus.

== Phylogeny ==
Molecular phylogenetic studies suggest the following relationships between extant taxa (Chaetosiphonaceae not included):

- - - Ostreobineae
      Ostreobiaceae
  - - Bryopsidineae
      - Pseudobryopsidaceae
      - - - Derbesiaceae
          - Codiaceae
        - Bryopsidaceae
    - Halimedineae
      - Dichotomosiphonaceae
      - - Caulerpaceae
        - Halimedaceae sensu lato (incl. Pseudocodiaceae, Rhipiliaceae, Udoteaceae)
