= Limu (algae) =

Polynesian edible underwater plants

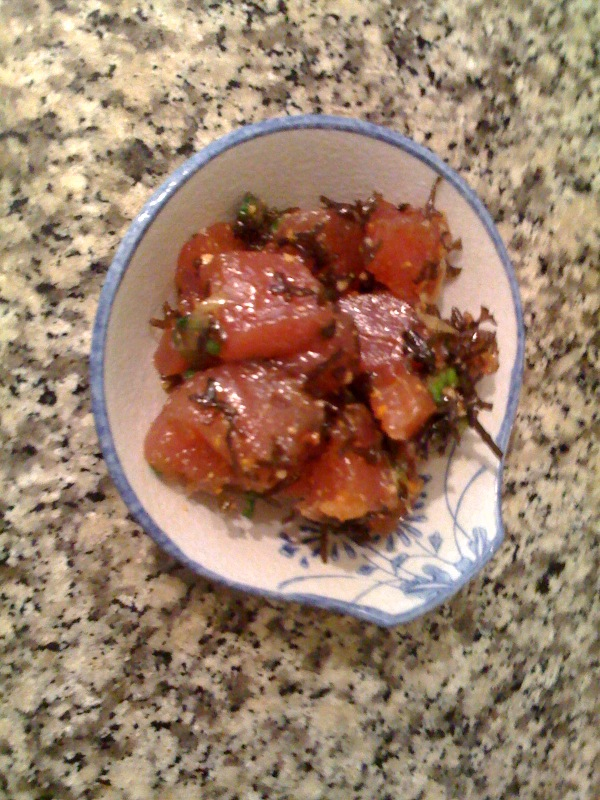
Ahi limu poke: raw fish with limu

Limu, otherwise known as rimu, remu or ʻimu (from Proto-Austronesian *limut) is a general Polynesian term for edible plants living near or underwater, such as algae. In Hawaii, there are approximately one hundred names for kinds of limu, sixty of which can be matched with scientific names. Hundreds of species of marine algae were once found in Hawaii. Many limu are edible, and used in the cuisine throughout most of Polynesia.

== Uses ==
Several species of limu are used as food throughout Polynesia and is typically eaten raw as accompaniment to meals, usually fish.

In Hawaii, limu was seen as a major component of the Hawaiian diet alongside fish and poi. Hawaiians cultivated several varieties of seaweed for food as well as to feed fish farmed within fish ponds. As many as 75 types of limu were used for food, more than the 35 used in Japanese cuisine, which is also well known for its use of seaweed. In modern times, limu is often used as a condiment, typically in raw fish dishes such as poke.

Limu was used in hoʻoponopono, the ancient Hawaiian process of conflict resolution. Injured and accused parties gathered to pray, seek forgiveness and eat limu kala leaves as a symbol of reconciliation. It is also used in traditional hula attire and as medicine.

Due to the shape of its foliage, the Maori also applied the name rimu to the native tree Dacrydium cupressinum.

== Types ==
Limu comes from multiple genera

=== Cook Islands ===
Image	English name	Indigenous name	Description and use
	Crowned sea bells (Turbinaria ornata)	Remu taratara (Rarotonga and Mauke), Rimu taratara (Aitutaki), Limu (Pukapuka)	
	Double-edge sargassum (Sargassum aquifolium)	Rimu akau	
	Open-sponge seaweed (Hydroclathrus clathratus)	Remu oma (Rarotonga)	
	Sargassum obtusifolium (Sargassum obtusifolium)	Remu ʻūmoemoe (Rarotonga)	
	Sea grapes (Caulerpa racemosa)	Remu kai (Rarotonga and Mauke), Remu kōnini (Mangaia), Rimu kai (Aitutaki)	
	Turkeytail seaweed (Padina boryana)	Remu taʻiriʻiri (Rarotonga)	

=== Easter Island ===
Image	English name	Indigenous name	Description and use
	Dictyopteris australis (Dictyopteris australis)	Auke	
	Sargassum obtusifolium (Sargassum obtusifolium)	Miritoni	

=== French Polynesia ===
Image	English name	Indigenous name	Description and use
	Cactus tree alga (Caulerpa cupressoides)	Mamaʻga (Rapan)	
	Chnoospora minima (Chnoospora minima)	Imu keikei aoa (Marquesan)	
	Cladophora patentiramea (Cladophora patentiramea)	Imu ouoho (Marquesan)	
	Gracilaria (Gracilaria)	Remu ʻura (Tahitian)	
	Grass kelp (Enteromorpha flexuosa)	Imu vai (Marquesan)	
	Green sea cushion (Codium arabicum)	Imu tutae kioe (Marquesan)	
	Sea grapes (Caulerpa racemosa)	ʻonini (Tahitian), Imu topua (Marquesan), Remu vine (Austral), Konini (Rapan)	
	Sea lettuce (Ulva lactuca)	Rimu miti (Tahitian), Imu kokuu (Marquesan)	

=== Hawaii ===
Image	English name	Indigenous name	Description and use
	Antler seaweed (Codium reediae)	Limu aʻalaʻula	
	Branched sea cushion (Codium edule)	Limu wawaeʻiole	Meaning "rat's foot seaweed"
	Branched string lettuce (Ulva prolifera)	Limu ʻeleʻele	
	Champia (Champia)	Limu ʻoʻolu	Meaning "thin seaweed". Shares its name to the similarly used species Chondria tenuissima.
	Chondria tenuissima (Chondria tenuissima)	Limu ʻoʻolu	Meaning "thin seaweed". Shares its name to the similarly used Champia seaweeds.
	Chylocladia (Chylocladia)	Limu akuila, Limu kihe	
	Crowned sea bells (Turbinaria ornata)	Limu kahili	
	Dictyopteris (Dictyopteris)	Limu lipoa	Meaning "seaweed gathered from the deep" referring to its habitat of growing in deep water. The species Dictyopteris australis and Dictyopteris plagiogramma were gathered as food.
	Dictyota (Dictyota)	Limu alani	Meaning "bitter seaweed"
	Double-edge sargassum (Sargassum aquifolium)	Limu kala	Meaning "forgiving seaweed" employed during hoʻoponopono.
	Grateloupia filicina (Grateloupia filicina)	Limu huluhuluwaena	or "pubic hair") – favorite of Liliʻuokalani.
	Gelidium (Gelidium)	Limu loloa	Meaning "long or slender seaweed"
	Griffithsia (Griffithsia)	Moʻopunaakalīpoa, Moʻopuna	
	Gymnogongrus (Gymnogongrus)	Limu koele	Meaning "dry or hard seaweed"
	Halymenia formosa (Halymenia formosa)	Lepelepe-o-Hina	shawl of the goddess Hina. Shares its name with a native butterfly and a family of nudibranchs.
	Laurencia nidifica (Laurencia nidifica)	Limu maneʻoneʻo	
	Laver (Porphyra)	Limu luau, Lipaheʻe	
	Martensia fragilis (Martensia fragilis)	Limu haʻula	
	Ogo (Gracilaria coronopifolia)	Limu manauea	cooked with meats to form a savory jelly. Later diced raw with poke, mixed with chili and salt.
	Polysiphonia (Polysiphonia)	Limu hāwane	
	Red sea plume (Asparagopsis taxiformis)	Limu kohu	Meaning "supreme seaweed"
	Sailor's eye (Valonia utricularis)	Limu lipuʻupuʻu	
	Sea lettuce (Ulva lactuca)	Limu palahalaha, Pakaiea	named after a shark god who was swaddled in its silken leaves. used in hula
	Spyridia spinella (Spyridia spinella)	Limu hulu puaʻa	
	Tattered sea moss (Hypnea)	Limu hina	
	Tuffed seaweed (Ahnfeltiopsis concinna)	Limu ʻakiʻaki	

=== New Zealand ===
Image	English name	Indigenous name	Description and use
	Bubble caulerpa (Caulerpa sedoides)	Rimurimu	
	Carrageenan weed (Gigartina)	Rehia, Rimurehia	
	Clymene (Clymene)	Karengo, Kareko, Parengo, Reporepo	
	Eelgrass (Zostera)	Karepō, Nana	
	Gracilaria (Gracilaria)		
	Kelp (Laminariales)	Pakake, Pakaka	
	Laver (Porphyra)	Karengo, Kareko, Parengo, Reporepo	Originally, Karengo was used to describe seaweed belonging to the Porphyra genus. Recent genomic analysis however has Karengo cover more than 30 species belonging to genus Porphyra, Pyropia, Clymene and Lysithea.
	Lysithea (Lysithea)	Karengo, Kareko, Parengo, Reporepo	
	Neptune's necklace (Hormosira banksii)	Koiri	
	Sea lettuce (Ulva lactuca)	Rimu kaikai	
	Sea rimu (Caulerpa brownii)	Rimurimu	
	Southern bull kelp (Durvillaea)	Rimurapa, Rimuroa, Kōauau	
	Southern laver (Pyropia)	Karengo, Kareko, Parengo, Reporepo	

=== Niue ===
Image	English name	Indigenous name	Description and use
	Cactus tree alga (Caulerpa cupressoides)	Limu tahi	
	Sea grapes (Caulerpa racemosa)	Limu fua	

=== Samoa ===
Image	English name	Indigenous name	Description and use
	Crowned sea bells (Turbinaria ornata)	Limu lautalatala	
	Gracilaria (Gracilaria)	Limu aau	
	Halymenia (Halymenia)	A ʻau	
	Sargassum (Sargassum)	Limu vavoa	
	Sea grapes (Caulerpa racemosa)	Fuafua	
	Turkeytail seaweed (Padina boryana)	Limu lautaliga	

=== Tonga ===
Image	English name	Indigenous name	Description and use
	Cactus tree alga (Caulerpa cupressoides)	Kaka	
	Cladosiphon (Cladosiphon)	Tangaʻu	
	Flat-top sea grape (Caulerpa peltata)	Fuofua	
	Green feather algae (Caulerpa sertularioides)	Louniu, Louango, Tuʻaniu	
	Hypnea charoides (Hypnea charoides)	Limu vai	
	Scalpel green seaweed (Caulerpa scalpelliformis)	Palalafa	
	Sea grapes (Caulerpa racemosa)	Toke, Fuofua, Alako, Teʻemoa, Teʻepuaka	
	Serrated green seaweed (Caulerpa serrulata)	Kaka	

=== Tuvalu ===
Image	English name	Indigenous name	Description and use
	Sea grapes (Caulerpa racemosa)	Limu pukupuku	

== Threats ==
Limu has become increasingly difficult to find because of over-picking, pollution, and urban development, especially construction in watersheds. Many important kinds of limu grow best in brackish water where fresh water empties into the sea. Another threat to limu is the spread of marine alien invasive species, such as members of the genus Kappaphycus (smothering seaweed), Gracilaria salicornia (gorilla ogo), Avrainvillea amadelpha (leather mudweed), Hypnea musciformis (hook weed) and Acanthophora spicifera (prickly seaweed).

== See also ==
- Edible seaweed
- Oceanic cuisine
