= Rimu (disambiguation) =

Rimu can mean the following:

- Dacrydium cupressinum, also rimu, a tree endemic to New Zealand
- Rimu (algae), a general term for seaweeds in Polynesia
- Rimu, Southland, a locality in Southland, New Zealand
- Rimu, West Coast, a locality in the West Coast region of New Zealand
- Rimu, in Polynesian mythology, a god of the dead
