= Padina japonica =

Scientific classification
- Domain: Eukaryota
- Clade: Diaphoretickes
- Clade: SAR
- Clade: Stramenopiles
- Phylum: Gyrista
- Subphylum: Ochrophytina
- Class: Phaeophyceae
- Order: Dictyotales
- Family: Dictyotaceae
- Genus: Padina
- Species: P. japonica

Binomial name
- Padina japonica Yamada, 1931

Species of alga

Padina japonica is a species of small brown alga found in the tropical and subtropical Indo-Pacific region.

== Description ==
Padina japonica has a flat blade rolled into a circle. The upper surface is whitish while the underside is brown. It is similar to Padina australis but rather smaller and the blade is usually unsplit. Another very similar species is Padina sanctae-crucis; the underside of the latter is more highly calcified, the oogonia and the tetrasporangia are large and globular rather than small and oblong, and there is a single row of tetrasporangial sori rather than the multiple irregular rows of P. japonica.
