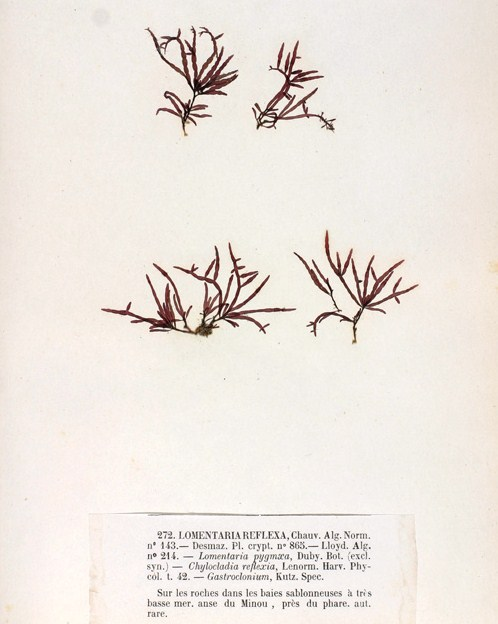
- Gastroclonium reflexum in Crouan brothers herbarium

Scientific classification
- Clade: Archaeplastida
- Division: Rhodophyta
- Class: Florideophyceae
- Order: Rhodymeniales
- Family: Champiaceae
- Genus: Gastroclonium
- Species: G. reflexum

Binomial name
- Gastroclonium reflexum (Chauvin) Kützing

= Gastroclonium reflexum =

Species of alga

Gastroclonium reflexum is a small red alga (Rhodophyta) reported from Ireland and Britain.

== Description ==
This small alga grows to about 6 cm long: the fronds grow from a branched holdfast are reflexed and form haptera where they meet the rock. The branches are hollow, terete to 6 cm long and constricted by septa giving a beaded appearance. The secondary branching is dichotomous, distichous. In colour they are dark purplish red. The species is very similar to Chylocladia verticillata with which it may be confused. Spermatangia, cystocarps and polysporangia have been recorded.

== Distribution ==
Gastroclonium is widely distributed in the north Atlantic Ocean and Mediterranean Sea, where it grows epilithically or epiphytically in the littoral or sublittoral zones.

In Great Britain, it has been recorded from Cornwall, Devon, Sussex, Norfolk, Pembrokeshire and Glamorgan. It was first recorded from Ireland by W.H.Harvey as Chylocladia reflexa Leorm. and published in 1846. Outside the British Isles, Gastroclonium has been recorded from the Channel Islands, Spain, Portugal, the Canary Islands, the Mediterranean Sea, Namibia, Morocco and South Africa.

== Records ==
Specimens collected from Lough Swilly by W. Sawers in 1854 are now preserved in the Ulster Museum (BEL) (F7058; F7059 and F7060) were redetermined as Chylocladia verticillata by Guiry as Chylocladia verticillata.
