= Turbinaria =

Turbinaria may refer to:

- Turbinaria (alga), a genus of seaweeds in the family Sargassaceae
- Turbinaria (coral), a genus of coral in the family Dendrophylliidae
