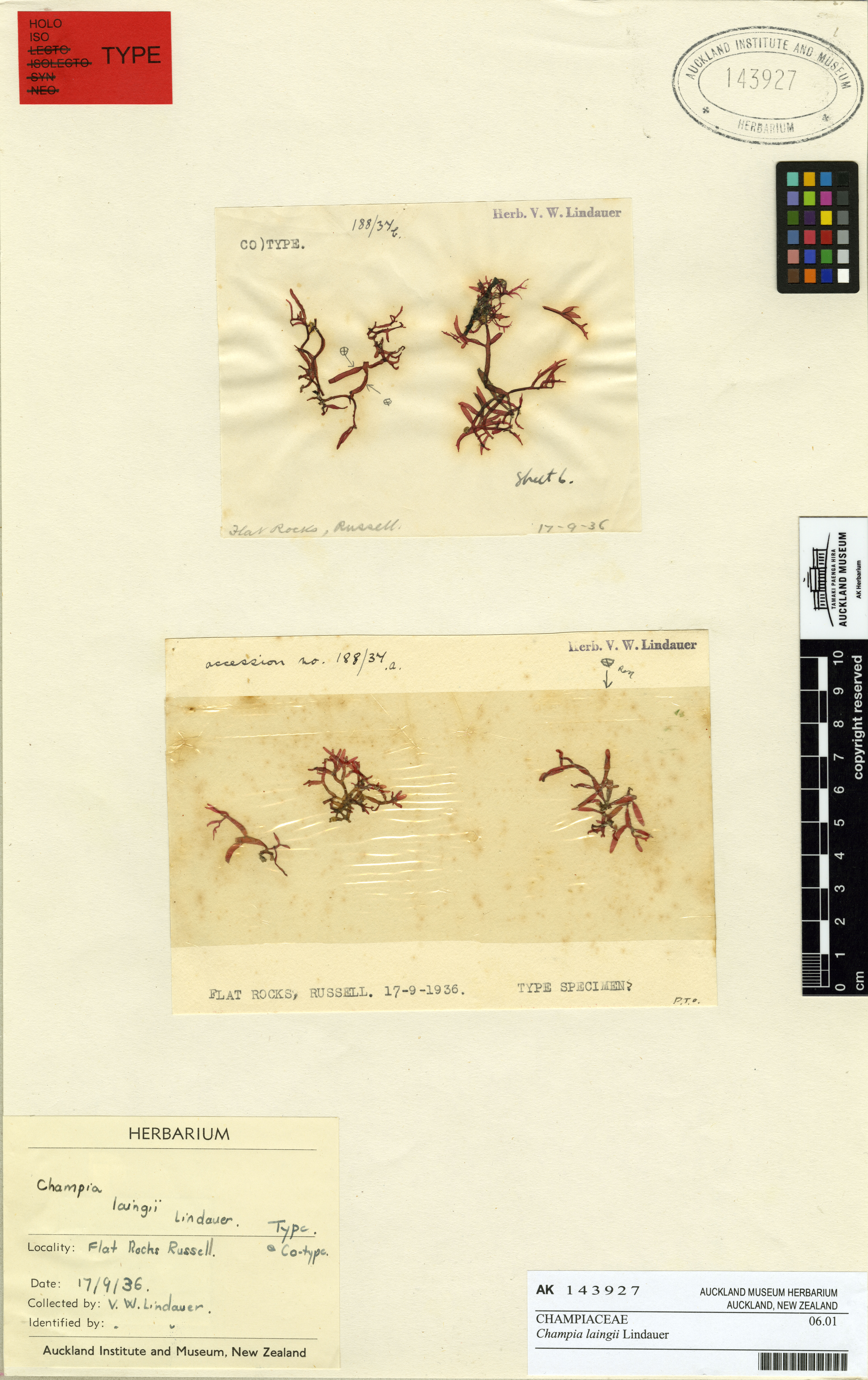
- (AM AK143927); Type specimen

Scientific classification
- Clade: Archaeplastida
- Division: Rhodophyta
- Class: Florideophyceae
- Order: Rhodymeniales
- Family: Champiaceae
- Genus: Champia
- Species: C. laingii

Binomial name
- Champia laingii Lindauer, 1938

= Champia laingii =

Species of algae

Champia laingii is a marine red algal species endemic to New Zealand.

It is a striking small seaweed, it is dark red but often shows an iridescent blue or green colour. It grows up to 40 cm and is often appears as a tangled mat.

It is usually found around the edges of rock pools at low tide, but also grows on some of the big seaweeds.

== Habitat ==
Champia laingii frequently disappears from localities for long periods. It is found near low-water mark at the edges of shallow pools often growing on (and sheltered by) Carpophyllum maschalocarpum, Xiphophora chondrophylla, and sometimes on Zonaria sinclairii. It also attach is found attached to fragments of shell, sand, and rock. The plant seems to prefer shallow pools and channels on roughly horizontal platforms having running water.

== Type specimen ==
The type specimen was found on Long Beach, at Russell, in the Bay of Islands by Vincent Wilhelm Lindauer (AK 143927).
