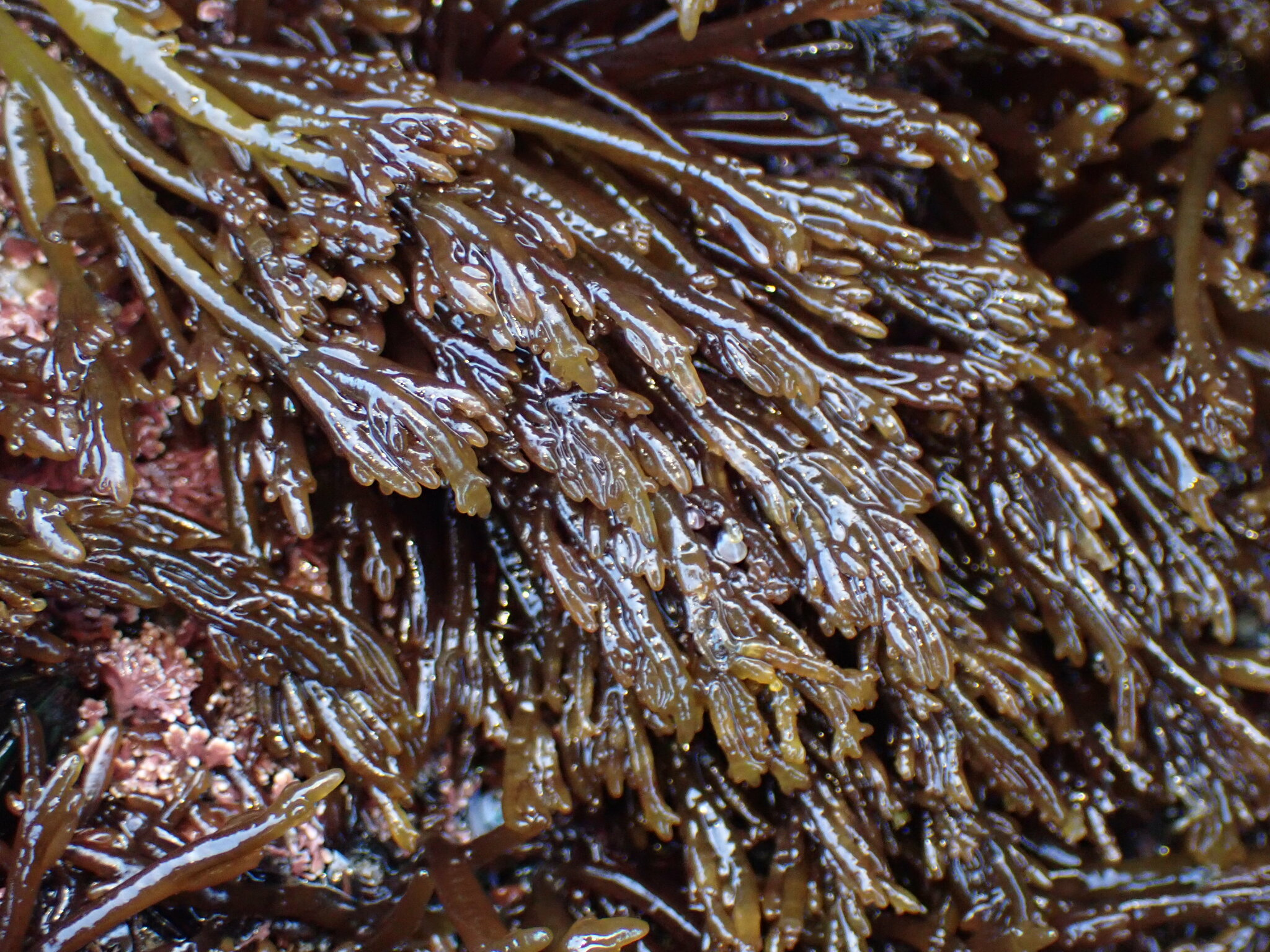

Scientific classification
- Clade: Archaeplastida
- Division: Rhodophyta
- Class: Florideophyceae
- Order: Rhodymeniales
- Family: Champiaceae
- Genus: Champia
- Species: C. novae-zelandiae

Binomial name
- Champia novae-zelandiae (J.D.Hooker & Harvey) Harvey

= Champia novae-zelandiae =

Species of seaweed

Champia novae-zelandiae is a species of seaweed.

== Description ==
A small red algae that lives in the sea.

== Range ==
New Zealand.

== Habitat ==
This species is found in the intertidal zone, as well as slightly deeper.

== Ecology ==
Champia novae-zelandiae can attach to other seaweeds.

== Etymology ==
The species name comes from the location where it is found, in New Zealand.

== Taxonomy ==
Champia novae-zelandiae contains the following varieties:

- Champia novae-zelandiae var. dolchipoda
- Champia novae-zelandiae var. novae-zelandiae
