= Dictyopteris australis =

Scientific classification
- Domain: Eukaryota
- Clade: Sar
- Clade: Stramenopiles
- Division: Ochrophyta
- Class: Phaeophyceae
- Order: Dictyotales
- Family: Dictyotaceae
- Genus: Dictyopteris
- Species: D. australis

Binomial name
- Dictyopteris australis (Sonder) Askenasy, 1888

Forms
- Dictyopteris australis f. karachiensis Nizamuddin & Saifullah, 1967

Synonyms
- Dictyopteris pardalis (Harvey) V.May, 1947; Haliseris australis Sonder, 1853; Haliseris pardalis Harvey, 1855; Neurocarpus pardalis (Harvey) Kuntze, 1898

Species of brown algae

Dictyopteris australis is a species of brown algae in the family Dictyotaceae found in warm and temperate seas worldwide. Dictyopteris australis is typically found in either shallow coastal waters or deeper waters as long as reef is present.

== Description ==
The odor that Dictyopteris australis gives off is often compared to the smell of the ocean and salt water. The algae is abundant and can grow up to 40 cm (16 in) in length. As the species states, the algae is brown in color featuring dark spots. There are many branches that grow away from the main body that end in lightly forked tips.

== Distribution and habitat ==
The distribution of Dictyopteris australis across temperate waters leads it to be found all along the equator making appearances in islands all across the Pacific Ocean, Australia, and South America. it can be found growing on rocky surfaces and corals. Dictyopteris australis is very abundant and common and can be found anywhere from 3 to 20 m (10 to 66 ft) underwater.

It can often be found washed up along Hawaii's shores during the spring and summer months.

== Cultural significance ==
In Hawaii, Dictyopteris australis, also known as "limu lipoa" locally, has a very pronounced cultural significance and is used in many ways from eating to traditional practices. Limu lipoa has been said to also contain healing properties and act as a mediator in conflict.

Dictyopteris australis can be eaten and is often used in a variety of Hawaiian dishes, the most prevalent being its use in sushi.
