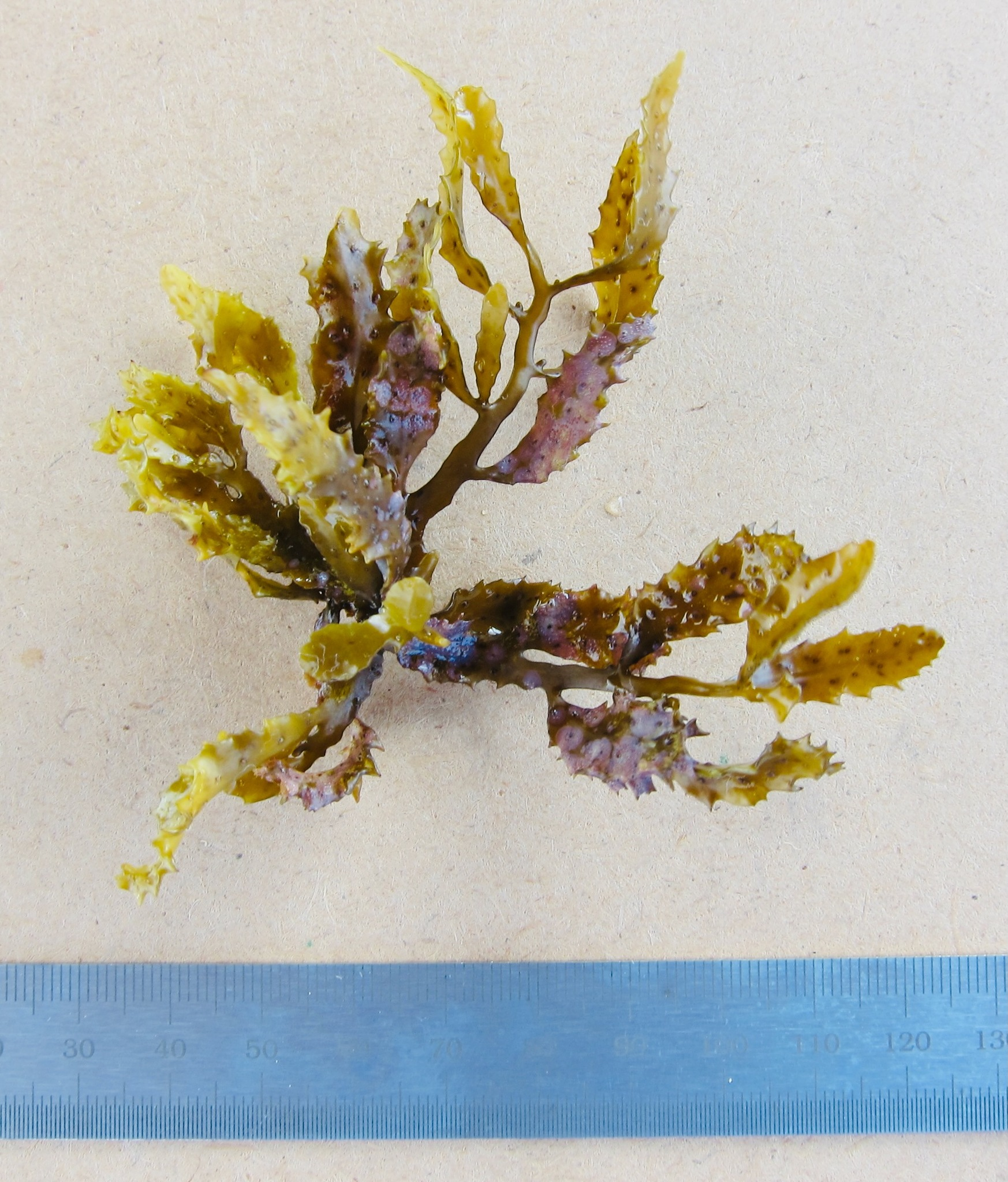

Scientific classification
- Domain: Eukaryota
- Clade: Sar
- Clade: Stramenopiles
- Phylum: Ochrophyta
- Class: Phaeophyceae
- Order: Fucales
- Family: Sargassaceae
- Genus: Sargassum
- Species: S. aquifolium

Binomial name
- Sargassum aquifolium J.Agardh

= Sargassum aquifolium =

Species of algae

Sargassum aquifolium, formerly known as Sargassum echinocarpum, is an abundant brown algae of the order Fucales, class Phaeophyceae, genus Sargassum. In Hawaii, it is commonly known as limu kala. This alga is endemic to Hawaiʻi, one out of the four endemic species of Sargassum.

== Description ==
Sargassum aquifolium can reach up to 30 centimeters with a flat main branch and wide, short, spiny leaves. Size vary based on where they live, but S. aquifolium that live on reef flats are usually larger and more narrow. Leaves range from 2.54–10.16 centimeters (1–4 inches) in length and 1.27 centimeters (0.5 inches) in width. Leaves are golden-brown color with brown dots and a clear spine. Edges of leaves are smooth or spiny with toothlike edges. Sargassum aquifolium can float due to the pneumatocysts found on the leaves.

== Distribution and habitat ==
Sargassum aquifolium is endemic to the Hawaiian islands. Sargassum aquifolium is the most common and largest species of Sargassum in Hawaii. Sargassum aquifolium can be found growing year-round in subtidal ranges with rocky terrain and reef flats. Sargassum aquifolium is common to wave-washed lava benches and can also be found in warm, calm tide pools with depths of more than 3 meters (10 feet). This seaweed grows in habitats where waves are present and moderate and usually thrives in the North Pacific where winter swells come in.

== Human use ==
Leaves of Sargassum aquifolium are used as food. The youngest leaves are picked and used because the older leaves are too tough to eat. Leaves are washed and are soaked in fresh water overnight and can then be used in food. It is usually chopped or ground up and combined with other seaweeds or cooked in soup. Whole leaves are deep fried into chips. Sargassum aquifolium is also eaten fresh at the beach with raw fish or octopus. Sargassum aquifolium is also used for fish bait.

== Cultural significance ==
Limu kala was believed to be among many of its kind (limu, lit. 'seaweed') appearing in the first period of creation (wā) as mentioned in the Kumulipo.

It is often used in sacred ceremonies in Hawaiian culture. A ceremony called Hoʻoponopono used the leaves of the seaweed to pray to the gods and ask for forgiveness if they had offended anyone in the circle. This ceremony was usually done when a family was having problems and limu kala was used because it was associated with purification. Another use Hawaiians had for the seaweed was when they were going fishing. They would use the seaweed as bait for certain fishes. It gained the name limu honu after people realized that turtles enjoyed eating the seaweed too. S. aquifolium (limu kala) was also used in other healing and purifying ceremonies and adornment on hula dancers. In July 2023, Hawaii's governor signed Act 230 legislation designating limu kala as the state's official limu.
