= Padina gymnospora =

Scientific classification
- Domain: Eukaryota
- Clade: Sar
- Clade: Stramenopiles
- Division: Ochrophyta
- Class: Phaeophyceae
- Order: Dictyotales
- Family: Dictyotaceae
- Genus: Padina
- Species: P. gymnospora

Binomial name
- Padina gymnospora (Kützing) Sonder

Species of alga

Padina gymnospora, commonly known as peacock's tail and brown scroll algae, is a species of brown algae. The name peacock's tail is most likely derived from the thalli of this alga resembling the tail feathers of a peacock.
