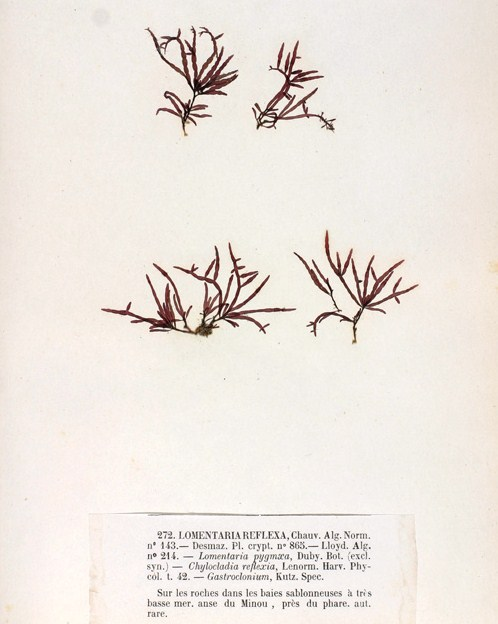
- Gastroclonium reflexum in Crouan brothers herbarium

Scientific classification
- Clade: Archaeplastida
- Division: Rhodophyta
- Class: Florideophyceae
- Order: Rhodymeniales
- Family: Champiaceae
- Genus: Gastroclonium; Kützing

= Gastroclonium =

Genus of algae

Gastroclonium is a genus of red algae (Rhodophyta) in the family Champiaceae. As of November 2018, according to AlgaeBase, it comprises the following species:

- Gastroclonium clavatum (Roth) Ardissone
- Gastroclonium compressum (Hollenberg) C.F.Chang & B.M.Xia
- Gastroclonium cylindricum Santelices, I.A.Abbott & Ramírez
- Gastroclonium iyengarii K.Srinivasan
- Gastroclonium ovatum (Hudson) Papenfuss
- Gastroclonium pacificum (E.Y.Dawson) C.F.Chang & B.M.Xia
- Gastroclonium parvum (Hollenberg) C.F.Chang & B.M.Xia
- Gastroclonium pygmaeum Funk
- Gastroclonium reflexum (Chauvin) Kützing
- Gastroclonium trichodes (C.Pujals) B.Santelices, I.A.Abbott & M.E.Ramírez
- Gastroclonium xishaense C.F.Chang & B.M.Xia
