= Gastroclonium ovatum =

Scientific classification
- Domain: Eukaryota
- Supergroup: Archaeplastida
- Division: Rhodophyta
- Class: Florideophyceae
- Order: Rhodymeniales
- Family: Champiaceae
- Genus: Gastroclonium
- Species: G. ovatum

Binomial name
- Gastroclonium ovatum (Hudson) Papenfuss

Species of alga

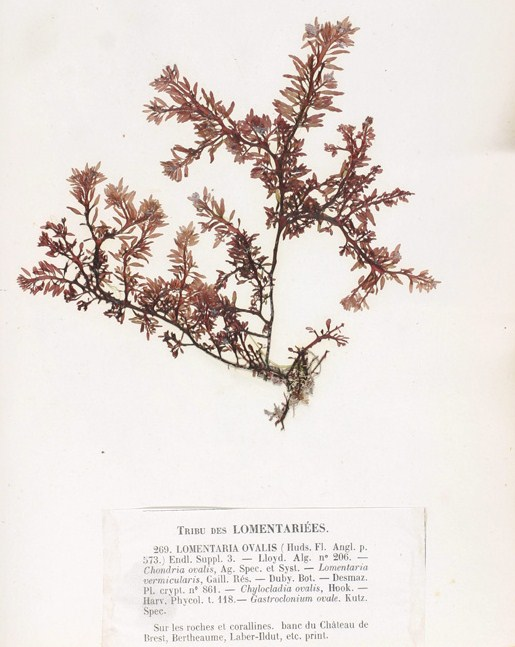
G. ovatum

Gastroclonium reflexum is a small red marine seaweed.

== Description ==
Gastroclonium ovatum is a small alga which grows to 15 cm long. The branches are cylindrical, grow from a branched holdfast and branch irregularly. It shows short branches which are hollow with bladder-like or vesicle-like branches - rather elongate with a single joint. In colour it is dark purplish red.

== Habitat ==
Found in rock pools in the littoral or upper sublittoral, epilithic or epiphytic.

== Distribution ==
Recorded from the British Isles, Mauritania, Canary Islands and the Channel Islands.

== Reproduction ==
The sexes are separate. The female cystocarps occur on the branches and the tetrasporangia in the cortex of the vesicles.

== Similar species ==
Gastroclonium reflexum distinguished by many branches being reflexed and Chylocladia verticillata.
