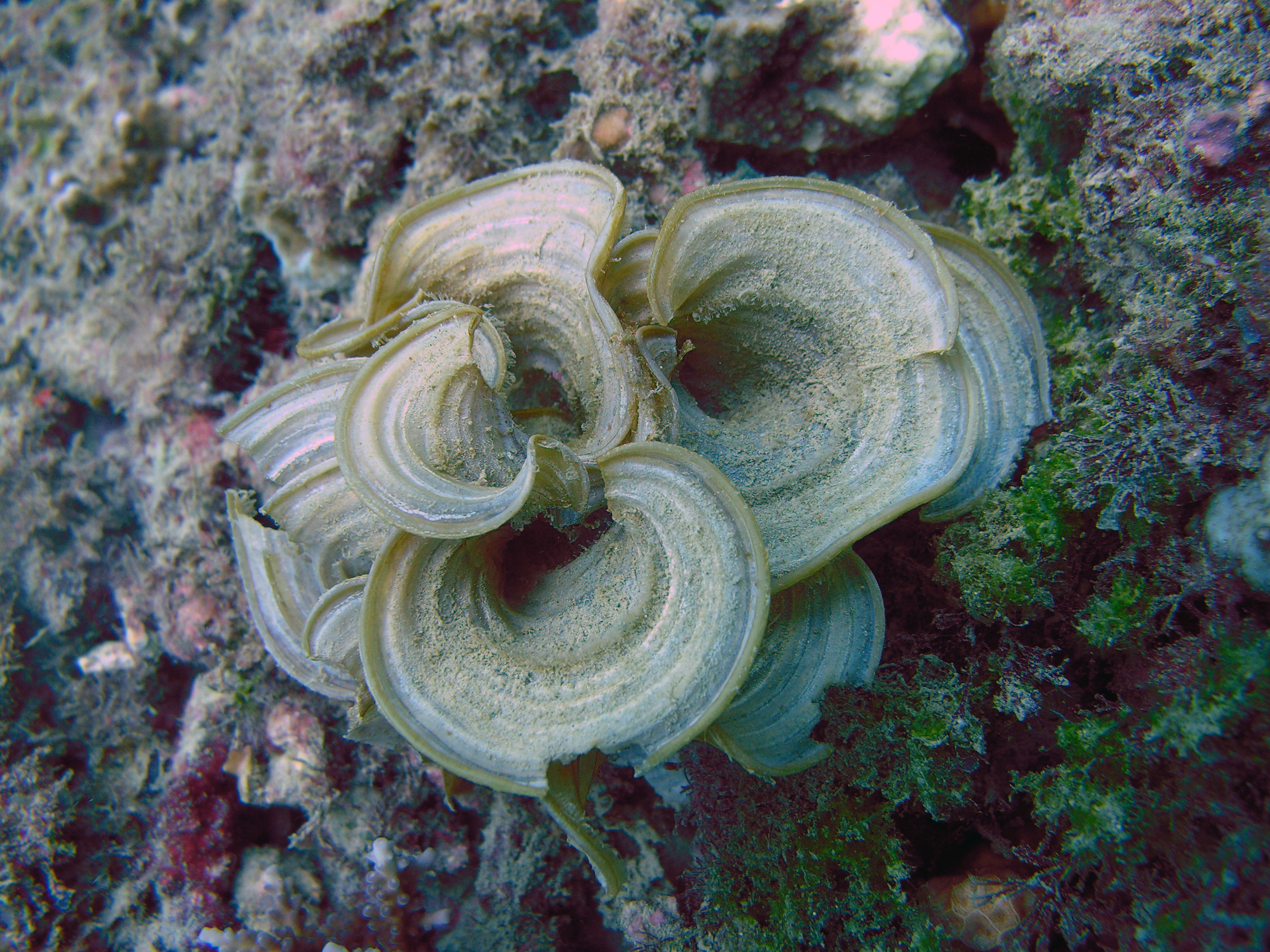
- Padina sp.

Scientific classification
- Domain: Eukaryota
- Clade: Diaphoretickes
- Clade: Sar
- Clade: Stramenopiles
- Phylum: Gyrista
- Subphylum: Ochrophytina
- Class: Phaeophyceae
- Order: Dictyotales
- Family: Dictyotaceae
- Genus: Padina; Adans. (1763)

= Padina (alga) =

Genus of brown algae

Padina is a genus of brown macroalgae in the family Dictyotaceae.

== Taxonomy and nomenclature ==
There was 58 taxonomically accepted Padina species, considered to be a species rich genera showing high species diversity within the genus as shown by recent phylogenetic research and taxonomic studies.

Species identification is considered to be a challenge in the genera, using a variety of morphological and life history traits are needed to be considered however, recent studies have used molecular markers to confirm species identification in a given locality. World Register of Marine Species accepts 71 species (as of July 2023).

== Species ==
As accepted by WoRMS;

- Padina afaqhusainii Aisha & Shameel, 2010
- Padina antillarum (Kützing) Piccone, 1886
- Padina arborescens Holmes, 1896
- Padina australis Hauck, 1887
- Padina boergesenii Allender & Kraft, 1983
- Padina boryana Thivy, 1966
- Padina calcarea Ni-Ni-Win, S.G.A.Draisma, W.F.Prud'homme van Reine & H.Kawai, 2012
- Padina caulescens Thivy, 1945
- Padina concrescens Thivy, 1945
- Padina condominium Kraft, 2009
- Padina crispata Thivy, 1945
- Padina distromatica Hauck, 1887
- Padina ditristromatica Ni-Ni-Win & H.Kawai, 2011
- Padina dubia Hauck, 1887
- Padina durvillei Bory Saint-Vincent, 1827
- Padina elegans Koh ex Womersley, 1987
- Padina fasciata Ni-Ni-Win, M.Uchimura & H.Kawai, 2010
- Padina fernandeziana Skottsberg & Levring, 1941
- Padina fraseri (Greville) Greville, 1830
- Padina glabra Gaillard, 1966
- Padina gymnospora (Kützing) Sonder, 1871
- Padina haitiensis Thivy, 1960
- Padina ishigakiensis Ni-Ni-Win, S.Arai, M.Uchimura & H.Kawai, 2011
- Padina japonica Yamada, 1931
- Padina jonesii Tsuda, 1972
- Padina macrophylla Ni-Ni-Win, M.Uchimura & H.Kawai, 2011
- Padina maroensis Ni-Ni-Win, I.A.Abbott & H.Kawai, 2011
- Padina melemele I.A.Abbott & Magruder, 1996
- Padina mexicana E.Y.Dawson, 1944
- Padina minor Yamada, 1925
- Padina moffittiana Abbott & Huisman, 2003
- Padina nizamuddinii Aisha & M.Shameel, 2010
- Padina ogasawaraensis Ni-Ni-Win, T.Hanyuda, M.Uchimura & H.Kawai, 2018
- Padina okinawaensis Ni-Ni-Win, S.Arai & H.Kawai, 2010
- Padina pavonica (Linnaeus) Thivy, 1960
- Padina pavonicoides Ni-Ni-Win & H.Kawai, 2011
- Padina perindusiata Thivy, 1960
- Padina phasiana Bory de Saint-Vincent
- Padina plumbea (Areschoug) Levring, 1940
- Padina profunda S.A.Earle, 1969
- Padina reniformis Ni-Ni-Win & H.Kawai, 2018
- Padina ryukyuana Y.Lee & Kamura, 1991
- Padina sanctae-crucis Børgesen, 1914
- Padina somalensis Hauck, 1887
- Padina stipitata Tanaka & Nozawa, 1960
- Padina sulcata Ni-Ni-Win, S.G.A.Draisma & H.Kawai, 2012
- Padina terricolor Ni-Ni-Win, M.Uchimura & H.Kawai, 2010
- Padina tetrastromatica Hauck, 1887
- Padina thivyae Doty & Newhouse, 1966
- Padina tristromatica Levring, 1942
- Padina undulata Ni-Ni-Win, S.Arai & H.Kawai, 2010
- Padina usoehtunii Ni-Ni-Win & H.Kawai, 2011
- Padina xishaensis C.K.Tseng & Lu, 1985
- Padina zonata Gaillon

== Morphology ==
Padina exhibits a flabellate-type appearance of its thalli, with a brown, off-white coloration. Its thallus consists of cells that is 2-8 layers thick, fan-shaped with hairs covering its margin. It has a stipe attached to its rhizoidal holdfast with blades conspicuously appearing as several layers of cell thick, with apparent zonations in its thalli producing coextensive rows of hair, distributed in rigid segments. Padina and Newhousia are the only genera in the brown algae group that is calcareous.

Padina species are differentiated based on the cell layer number, sporangial sori arrangement relative to hair bands and hair band presence or lack of on the lower thallus surface.

== Distribution ==
Padina inhabits tropical regions, although the genus can also be found in cooler temperate waters from South America to Southeast Asia. The genus is distinguishable because of its characteristic shape resembling a peacock tail structure. It can be found a wide range of habitats, ranging from intertidal to subtidal zones. Padina are found to be more prolific in clear waters at a depth of 15–20 m but can be seen up to 110 m in depth, attached to hard substrates or growing as epiphytes on larger seaweeds (e.g. Sargassum). Padina in the Indian Ocean have a much more narrow distribution, in specific localities compared to those in the Pacific with a distribution that is much more overlapping within regions

== Ecology ==
Padina can be found growing together with Gracilaria, Polysiphonia, Chaetomorpha, and Colpomenia. Padina boergesenii and Padina jamaicensis may exhibit morphological plasticity which may affect herbivore interactions and grazing pressure.

== Life history ==
Padina is described to have a life history following diplohaplontic phases and are isomorphic. Its gametophytes are either dioecious or monoecious, located haphazardly in its blades sometimes even on its sori. Padina has hairs on its reproductive organs, on one thallus surface organized in a concentric margin. In some species, these get lost as they mature. Sporangial sori of Padina can be seen on one or both thallus surface, with or without indusium.

== Cultivation and exploitation ==
No report on Padina cultivation is found.

== Chemical composition ==
Approximately 32% of taxonomically accepted Padina species are being investigated for numerous chemical and potential pharmacological applications. Bioactive compounds, including amino acids, terpene sterols, and sulphated polysaccharides were reported to be found in Padina, as well. Fucoidans can be obtained from two Padina species, P. tetrasomatica and P. boergesenii, which can be used in a 2% ointment for wound treatment. Bromo-phenols and other halogenated compounds have also been found in Padina, found to affect the endocrine system by damaging calcium ions in cells. Fucosterol, diterpenes, and fucoxanthin are also found in Padina which can slow down the spread of malignant cells.

== Utilization and management ==
Padina has been shown to be capable of adsorption, effectively accumulating numerous pollutants in its biomass. As bioindicators, Padina respond to alterations in temperature, light, nutrients, and other contaminants in marine ecosystems. In one study, the specific growth rate and chlorophyll content of Padina is negatively affected as cadmium concentration increases, suggesting Cd pollution. Hence, Padina are ecologically significant macroalgae which function as excellent bioindicators of aquatic pollution and potentially, remediation in marine ecosystems. As sources of different bioactive compounds, Padina may have potential applications on many pharmacological aspects
