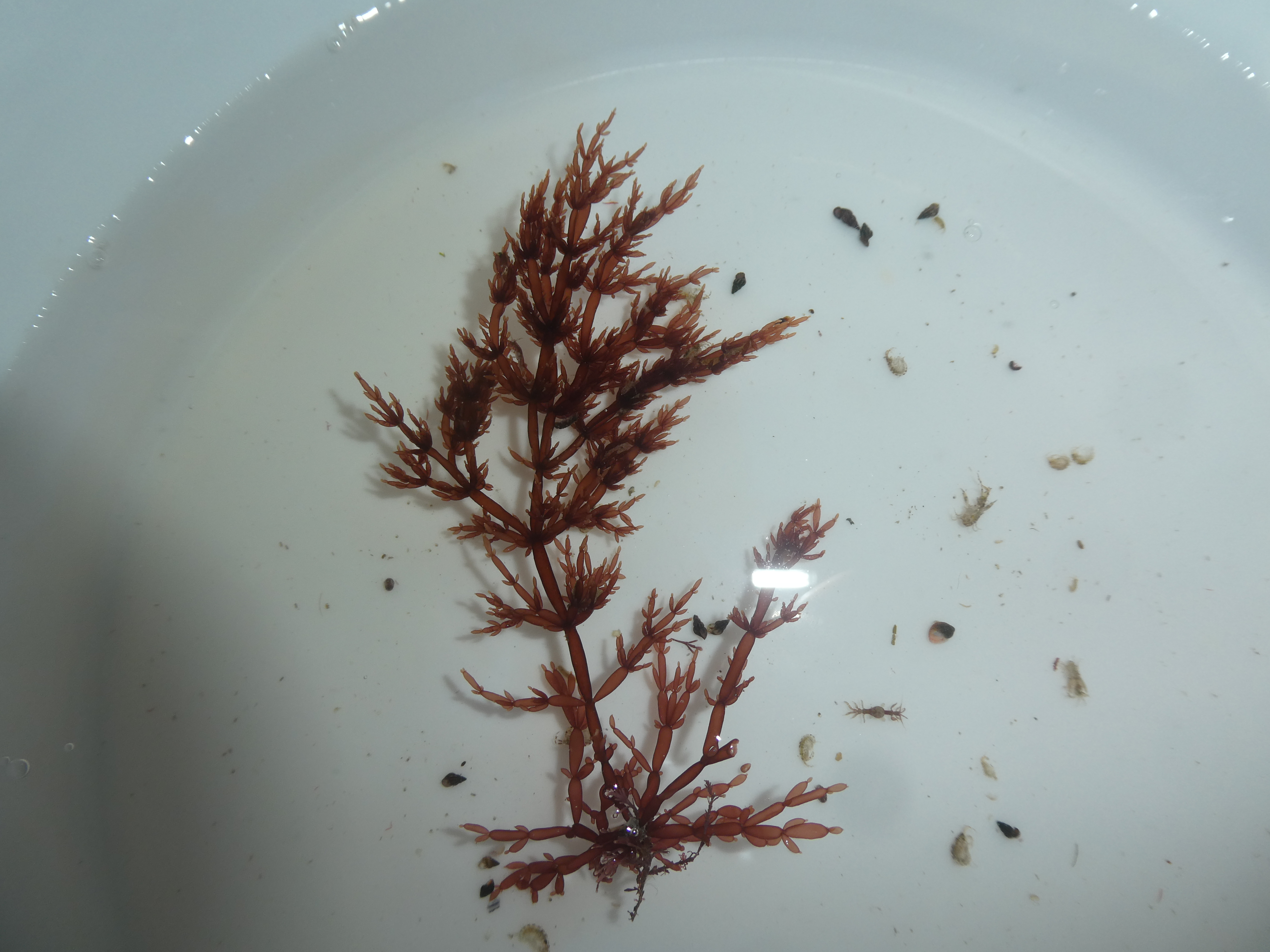

Scientific classification
- Clade: Archaeplastida
- Division: Rhodophyta
- Class: Florideophyceae
- Order: Rhodymeniales
- Family: Champiaceae
- Genus: Chylocladia
- Species: C. verticillata

Binomial name
- Chylocladia verticillata (Lightfoot) Bliding

= Chylocladia verticillata =

Species of alga

Chylocladia verticillata is a medium-sized red marine alga.

== Description ==
Chylocladia verticillata is a marine alga which grows erect to a length of 30 cm from a disk-shaped holdfast. It branches in a whorled manner the thallus is hollow and shows constrictions at intervals, it is mucilaginous, gelatinous, and up to 5 mm broad. In colour it is pinkish or purple. The structure is multiaxial.

== Habitat ==
Epilithic or epiphytic in the lower littoral in rock pools and in the sublittoral. Commonly found in the Laminarian zone.

== Reproduction ==
This alga is dioecious, cystocarps occur between April and October and tetraspores between May and September. The male structures are arranged around the constrictions. The sporangia are visible in the tissue of the younger branches.

== Distribution ==
Found around the shares of the British Isles but more rarely on the eastern shores. Also recorded from Norway to Morocco into the Mediterranean including the Canary Isles, also from the Channel Islands.

== Similar species ==
Champia parvula is not common but small specimens of Chylocladia verticillata may appear similar.
