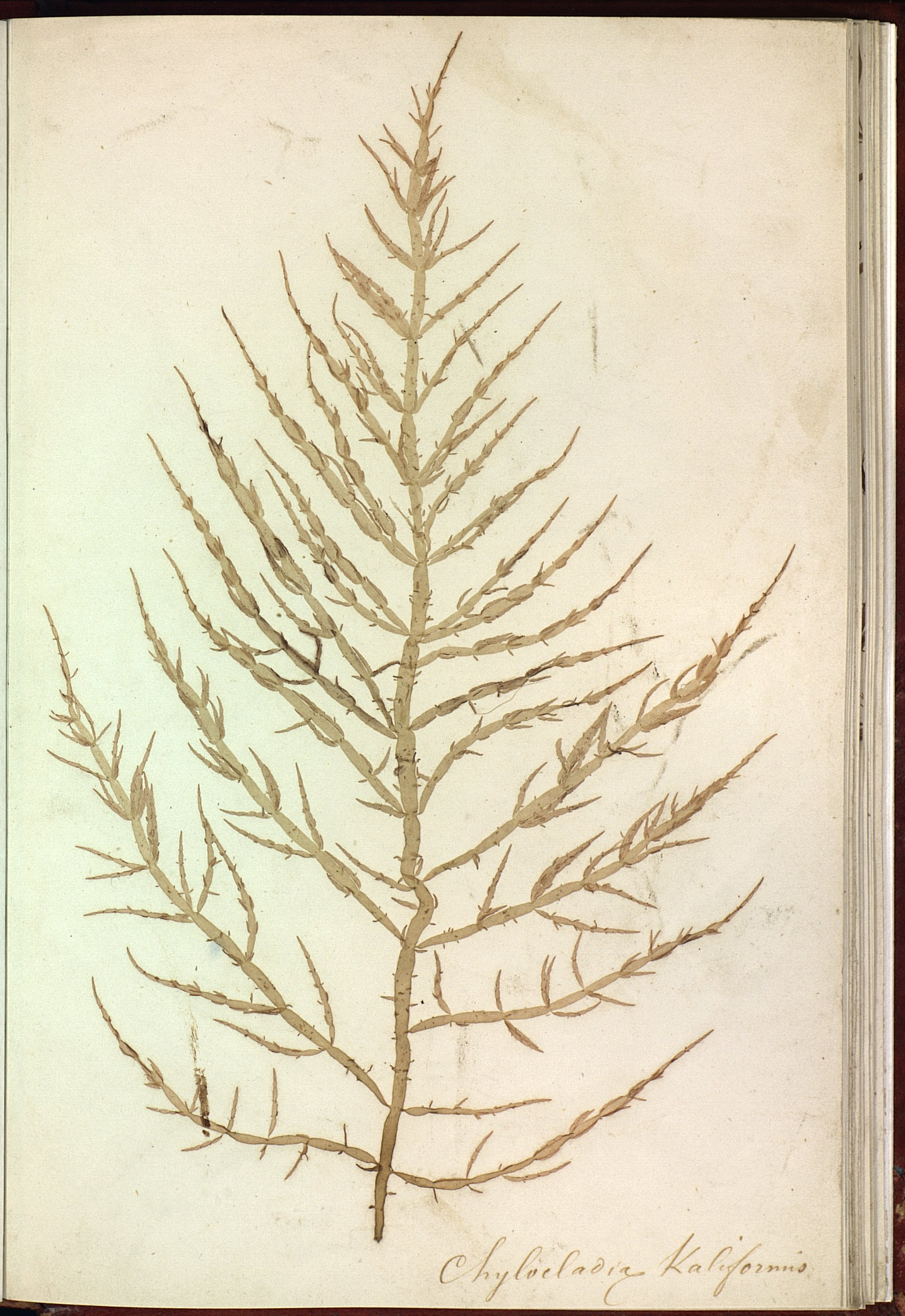
- Chylocladia kaliformis

Scientific classification
- Clade: Archaeplastida
- Division: Rhodophyta
- Class: Florideophyceae
- Order: Rhodymeniales
- Family: Champiaceae
- Genus: Chylocladia; Greville, 1833

= Chylocladia =

Genus of algae

Chylocladia is a genus of red algae belonging to the family Champiaceae.

The genus has almost cosmopolitan distribution.

Species:

- Chylocladia articulata (Hudson) Greville
- Chylocladia torulosa (Kützing) Dizerbo
- Chylocladia unistratosa Ercegovic
- Chylocladia verticillata (Lightfoot) Bliding
