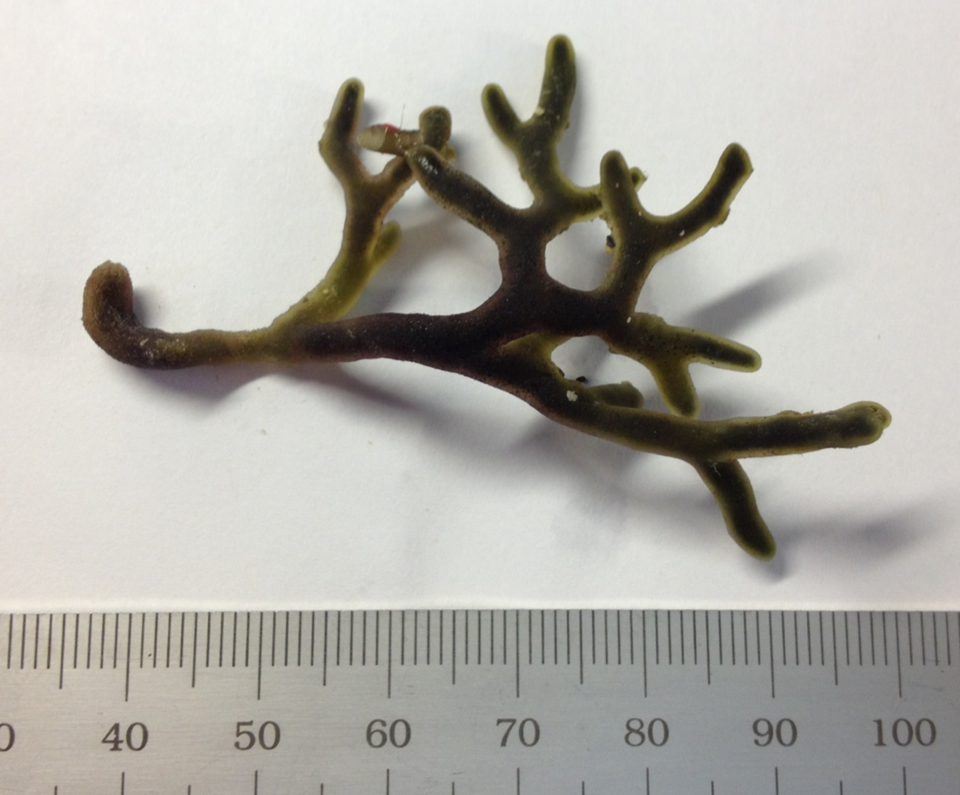

Scientific classification
- Kingdom: Plantae
- Division: Chlorophyta
- Class: Ulvophyceae
- Order: Bryopsidales
- Family: Codiaceae
- Genus: Codium
- Species: C. reediae

Binomial name
- Codium reediae Silva, 1952

= Codium reediae =

Species of green algae

Codium reediae is a species marine green algae in the family Codiaceae found in Hawaiian waters. It was named after Minnie Reed.

== Description ==
Codium reediae is dichotomously branched and upright. It has a spongy consistency with a cortex of loosely to tightly aggregated utricles. It can grow up to 7 cm tall.

== Distribution and habitat ==
Codium reediae grows in the subtidal regions of the Hawaiian and Micronesian islands. It grows at depths of up to 72m. It can be found in shallow water, in tidepools and reef flats.

== Cultural significance and human use ==
In Hawaiian Olelo, it is called Limu wāwae’iole, ‘a’ala, or ‘a’ala’ula meaning red fragrance. It shares these names with its sister species Codium edule. The Japanese name for c.reediae is miru.

Royal Hawaiian Sea Farms Inc. sells C.reediae for edible purposes. Like other seaweed, it has a short shelf-life and is commonly sold in Hawaii as well as California, Washington and Nevada.
