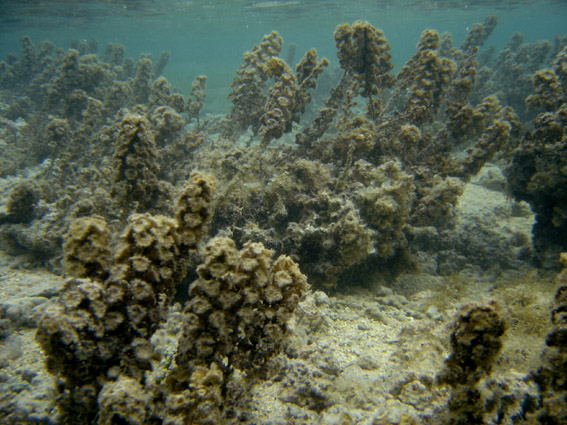

Scientific classification
- Domain: Eukaryota
- Clade: Sar
- Clade: Stramenopiles
- Division: Ochrophyta
- Class: Phaeophyceae
- Order: Fucales
- Family: Sargassaceae
- Genus: Turbinaria
- Species: T. ornata

Binomial name
- Turbinaria ornata (Turner) J.Agardh

= Turbinaria ornata =

Species of seaweed

Turbinaria ornata is a tropical brown algae of the order Fucales native to coral reef ecosystems of the South Pacific. Turbinaria ornata is more commonly referred to as crowded sea bells in the US and crowned sea bells worldwide. It can quickly colonize these ecosystems due in part to its method of dispersing by detaching older and more buoyant fronds that travel on surface currents, sometimes in large rafts of many individual thalli, or fronds. Some scientists are investigating whether the increase in density of seaweeds, and a decrease in living coral density, on coral reef ecosystems indicates a change in the health of the reef, focusing studies on this particular species of brown alga.

== Description ==
Yellow in color but can also be dark brown. It can span anywhere from 2-20 CM tall. A good way to describe it would be a club made up of spikey flowers. Turbinaria ornata can alter its morphology and strength of macroalgae in response to hydrodynamic forces.

== Distribution and habitat ==
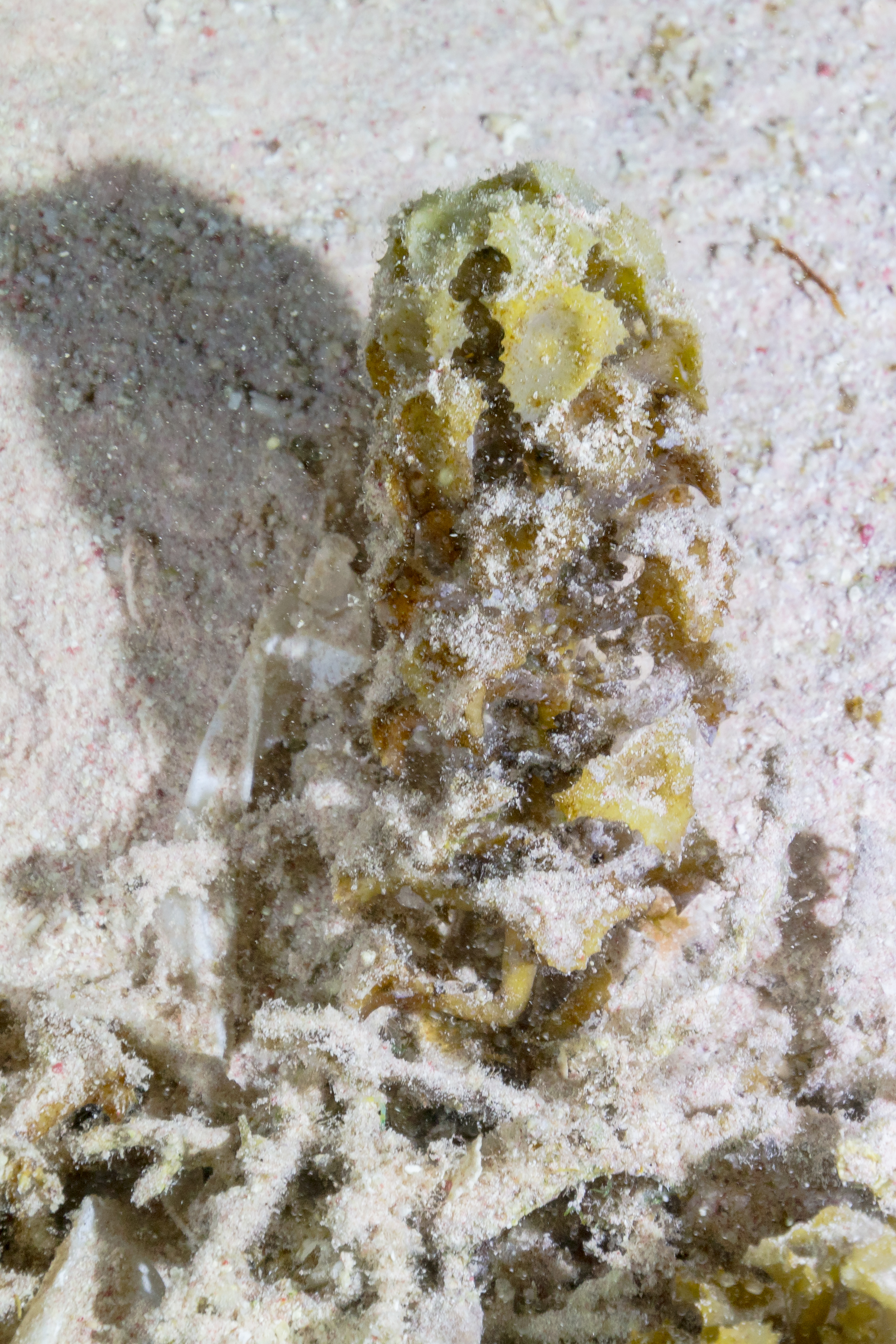
Detailed view

Widely distributed in the central and western Pacific and Indian oceans. Turbinaria ornata flourishes in tropical areas such as the Hawaiian islands and Tahiti. Very common in rocky interditdal areas. Most of the time they are the most abundant species of algae in the areas where they are found, with massive colonies. Although It is considered an invasive species in some places, Turbinaria Ornata is not considered a problem species in the Hawaiian islands. Turbinaria ornata have had a massive population explosion on the reefs around the globe due to their ability to alter their morphology according to hydrodynamic forces and their ability to produce air bladders that allow them to float to distant locations.

== Human use and cultural significance ==
Turbinaria ornata has a wide variety of health benefits and is being researched for pharmaceutical purposes because of its antioxidant, anti-inflammatory, antidiabetic, antiproliferative, and neuroprotective effects on humans. Turbinaria ornata has the proper compounds to be used as a potential source for reducing postprandial hyperglycemia in humans making it an alternative therapeutic approach in treating diabetes. Turbinaria ornata can be grown and used as a natural alternative wastewater treatment that would reduce untreated dangerous chemicals from being dumped into land and water bodies. Compounds found in T. ornata can also be used to restore land and bodies of water that were previously contaminated by toxic and environmentally destructive chemicals.

In Hawaiian, Turbinaria ornata is called Limu Kahili. Limu, or seaweed, and Kāhili, which is a feathered ornament which was a symbol of the royalty amongst Hawaiian families and chiefs.
