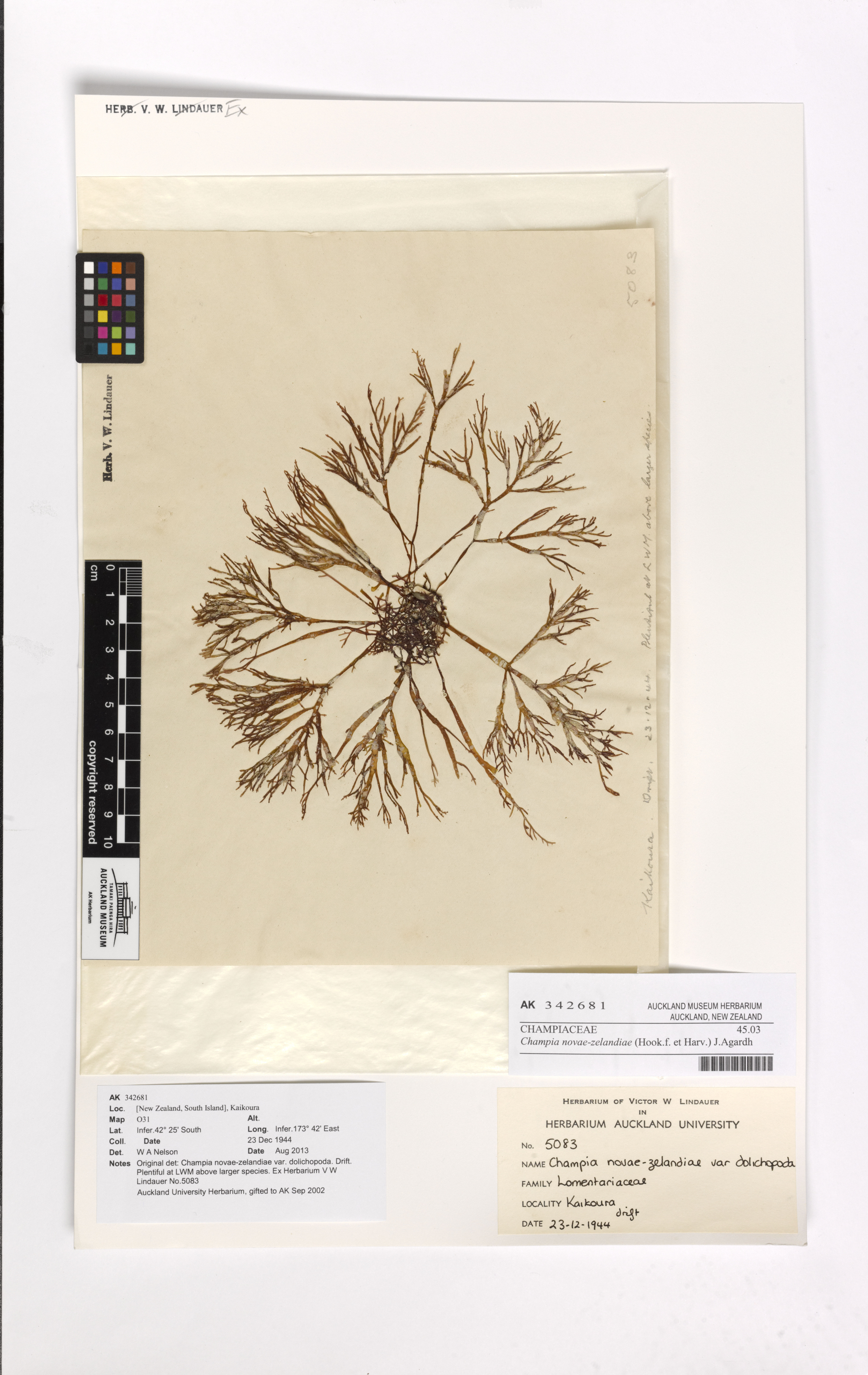
- Champia novae-zelandiae (AM AK342681)
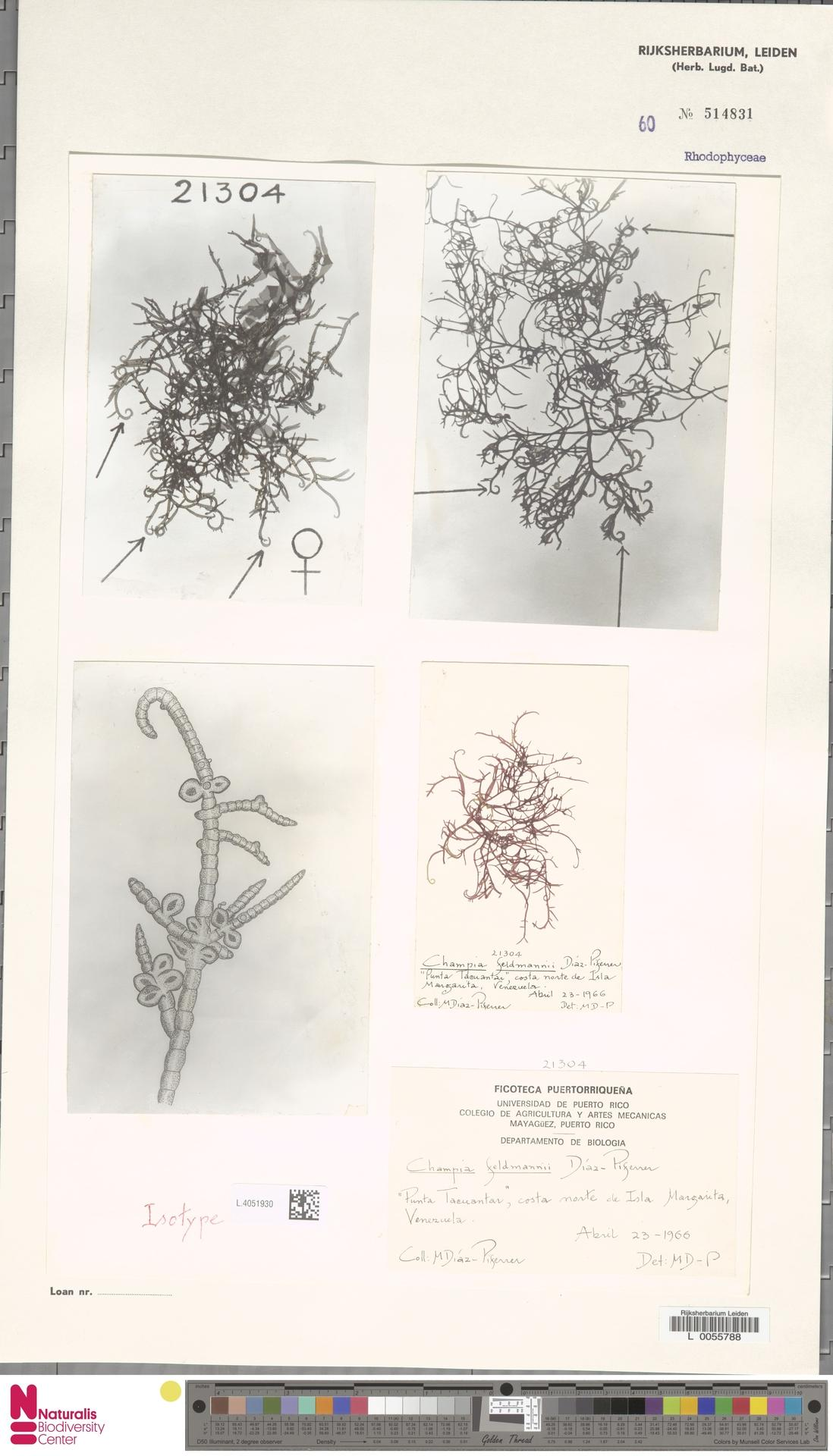
- Champia feldmannii (L.4051930)

Scientific classification
- Domain: Eukaryota
- Clade: Archaeplastida
- Division: Rhodophyta
- Class: Florideophyceae
- Order: Rhodymeniales
- Family: Champiaceae
- Genus: Champia; Desvaux, 1809

Type species
- Champia lumbricalis (Linnaeus) Desvaux

Species
- See text

= Champia =

Genus of algae

Champia is a genus of red algae in the family Champiaceae, first described in 1809 by Nicaise Auguste Desvaux

The genus name of Champia is in honour of the French physician and naturalist Louis Auguste Deschamps (1765–1842).

== Species ==
There are a number of accepted species:

- Champia affinis (J.D.Hooker & Harvey) Harvey
- Champia bibendum Huisman
- Champia bifida Okamura
- Champia caespitosa E.Y.Dawson
- Champia chathamensis V.J.Chapman & Dromgoole
- Champia compressa Harvey
- Champia disticha E.Y.Dawson
- Champia echigoensis Noda
- Champia expansa Yendo
- Champia farlowii M.K.Griffith, C.W.Schneider & C.E.Lane
- Champia feldmannii Díaz-Piferrer
- Champia gigantea M.J.Wynne
- Champia globulifera Børgesen
- Champia harveyana D.L.Ballantine & C.Lozada-Troche
- Champia hasselbringii C.W.Schneider & G.W.Saunders
- Champia indica Børgesen
- Champia inkyui Y.H.Koh, G.Y.Cho & M.S.Kim
- Champia insignis A.H.S.Lucas
- Champia insularis C.W.Schneider & G.W.Saunders
- Champia irregularis (Zanardini) Piccone
- Champia japonica Okamura
- Champia kotschyana Endlicher & Diesing
- Champia laingii Lindauer
- Champia lubrica Mas.Suzuki & Yoshizaki
- Champia lumbricalis (Linnaeus) Desvaux - type
- Champia minuscula A.B.Joly & Ugadim
- Champia novae-zelandiae (J.D.Hooker & Harvey) Harvey
- Champia parvula (C.Agardh) Harvey
- Champia patula Huisman & G.W.Saunders
- Champia plumosa P.Anand
- Champia pseudoparvula Huisman & G.W.Saunders
- Champia puertoricensis Lozada-Troche & D.L.Ballantine
- Champia recta Noda
- Champia salicornioides Harvey
- Champia somalensis Hauck
- Champia spathulata Weber Bosse
- Champia stipitata Huisman
- Champia subcompressa Huisman
- Champia taironensis Bula-Meyer
- Champia tripinnata Zanardini
- Champia vieillardii Kützing
- Champia viridis C.Agardh
- Champia womersleyi A.J.K.Millar
- Champia zonata (J.Agardh) J.Agardh
- Champia zostericola (Harvey) Reedman & Womersley
