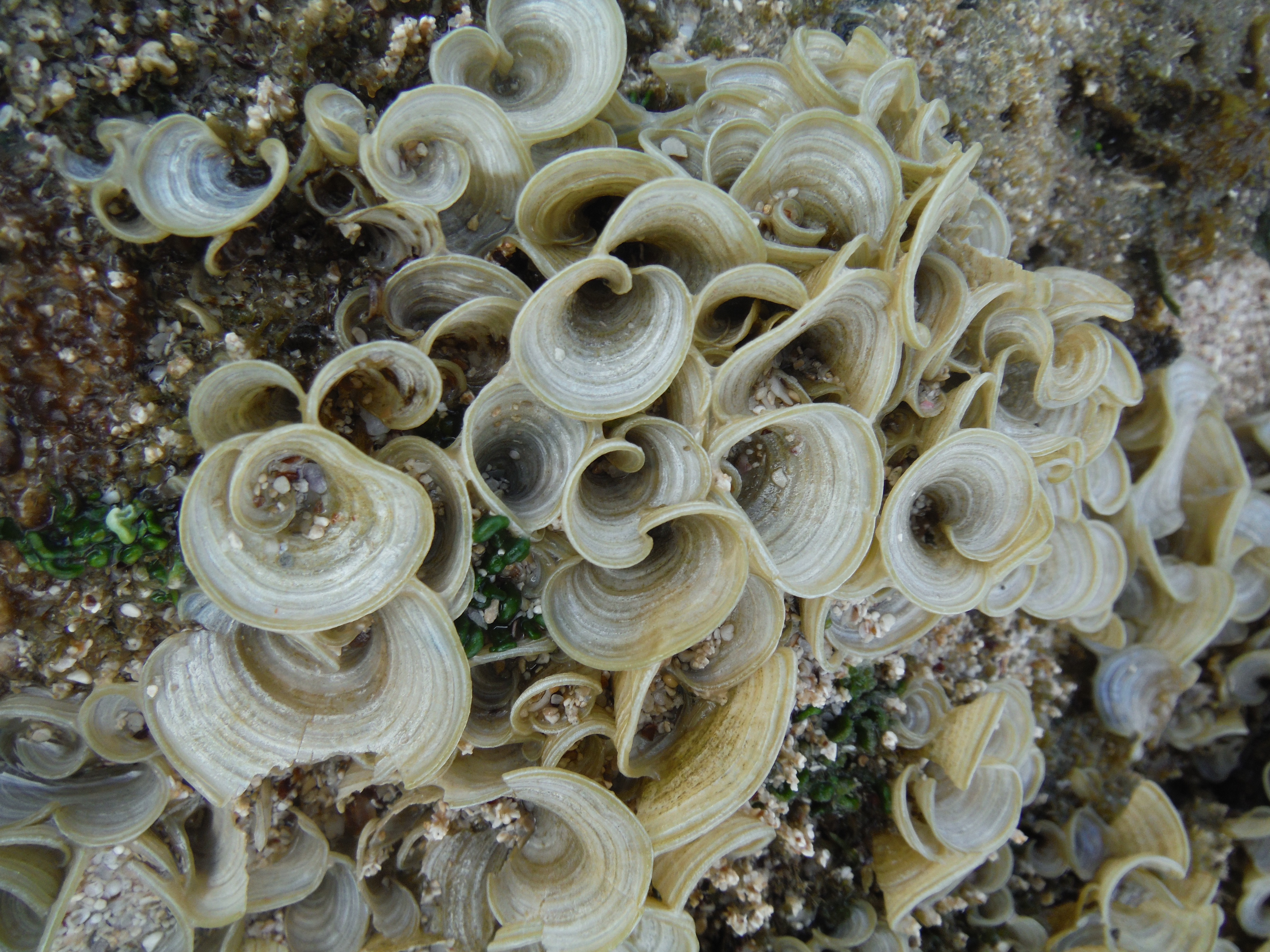

Scientific classification
- Domain: Eukaryota
- Clade: Sar
- Clade: Stramenopiles
- Phylum: Ochrophyta
- Class: Phaeophyceae
- Order: Dictyotales
- Family: Dictyotaceae
- Genus: Padina
- Species: P. sanctae-crucis

Binomial name
- Padina sanctae-crucis Børgesen

= Padina sanctae-crucis =

Species of algae

Padina sanctae-crucis is a species of brown macroalgae in the family Dictyotaceae. It is a tropical brown algae species native to the south pacific that belongs to the Padina genus. this alga includes sexual reproduction and spore-producing asexual reproduction which is moved with the tide until spores plants itself on a hard rocky substrate. Other habitats include rocks and shell fragments in the shallow sublittoral, seagrass meadows, mangrove roots and coral reefs on tidal flats.

== Description ==
Padina sanctae-crucis forms curled, fanlike branches from a single stalk. The plant is about 15 cm tall. Blades are often irregularly split and branched. The upper surfaces of the fans are calcified and whitened, but the rest of the plant is brownish. All the branches are crossed by closely set growth lines.

== Locations ==
Regions of occurrence

Locations

Padina sanctae-crucis prefers tropical waters and can be found in most of the world's tropical waters. Including Florida, the Caribbean sea, Brazil, and the south pacific. This alga tends to thrive in Rock pools in intertidal to subtidal zones on rocky substrates, especially on reef flats up to 10m in depth.

== Uses ==
Since Padina sanctae-crucis is used in food, it is known to be rich in fatty acids, which are an excellent source of nutrients for mammals. There are also extracts of this seaweed that have been found to have anticarcinogenic and cytotoxic activity. For example, an organic extract shows toxicity to the oral epidermoid carcinoma cell line KB with a minimal infective dose of 6.5 μg/ml. Padina sanctae-crucis was also concluded to be an excellent absorbent for removing MV dyes from aqueous solutions.
