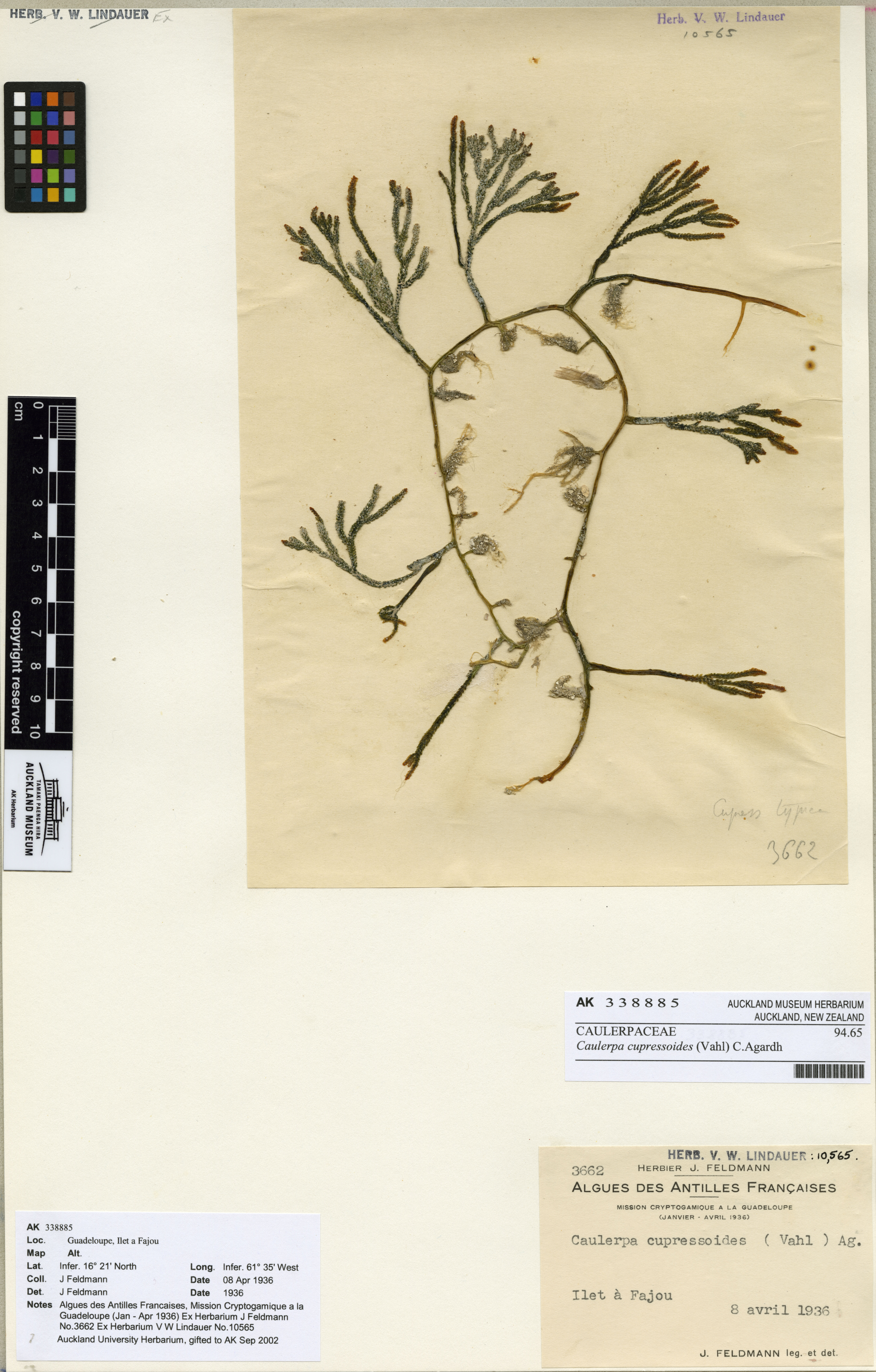

Scientific classification
- Kingdom: Plantae
- Division: Chlorophyta
- Class: Ulvophyceae
- Order: Bryopsidales
- Family: Caulerpaceae
- Genus: Caulerpa
- Species: C. cupressoides

Binomial name
- Caulerpa cupressoides (Vahl) C.Agardh

= Caulerpa cupressoides =

Cactus tree alga

Species of alga

Caulerpa cupressoides, commonly known as cactus tree alga, is a species of seaweed in the Caulerpaceae family. Green alge of Caulerpa genus are salty and pungent in style and are consumed by several marine cultures around the world.

== Description ==
The plant has runners that are overlaid by sand rising up to thick stalks that split into heavy upright branches that are in turn lined with rows of short think branchlets. The length can vary from 2 to 25 centimetres (0.8 to 9.8 in) with a tall slender habit to a short bushy habit. It is a coenocytic species that grows well in shallow protected areas with sandy bottoms.

== Distribution ==
It is found around much of the world including the Americas between Florida and Brazil including most of the islands of the Caribbean. Both coasts of Africa as far south as South Africa and many of the islands in Atlantic, Indian and Pacific Oceans. Found through much of Asia and in Australia it is found in Queensland and in Western Australia along the coast in a large area extending from around Perth then north through the Mid West and Pilbara coasts and into the Kimberley region

== Taxonomy ==
The species was described by Carl Adolph Agardh in 1817 as a part of the work Synopsis algarum Scandinaviae, adjecta dispositione universali algarum. The specific epithet is taken from Latin, meaning cypress like. A synonym is Fucus cupressoides.

Several variations of the species exist including:

- Caulerpa cupressoides var. cupressoides
- Caulerpa cupressoides var. elegans
- Caulerpa cupressoides var. flabellata
- Caulerpa cupressoides var. lycopodium
- Caulerpa cupressoides var. mamillosa

== Biomedical potential ==
Caulerpa genus consists of species that are resistant to herbivorous fishes due to its high content of sesquiterpenes and other phytochemicals that act as a chemical defense against herbivorous fishes. These chemical compounds are researched in order to find new compounds that can be used as antiviral, antimicrobial, cytotoxic, immunostimulatory, anti-obesity, cardioprotective, hepatoprotective and hypolipidemic medications.

=== Sulfated polysaccharides ===
The sulfated polysaccharides were detected in Caulerpa cupressoides var. flabellata, collected from Nísia Floresta in Brazil. These unique polysaccharides had anticoagulant, antioxidant, and immunostimulatory activities, which suggest potential biomedical applications. However, polysaccharides extracted from these species did exhibit dose-dependent anticoagulant activities in the intrinsic and extrinsic pathways.

=== Lectins ===
Seaweeds are rich sources of lectins, which are glycoproteins of nonimmune origin that bind reversibly to specific mono or oligosaccharides, without exerting any enzymatic activity on these carbohydrates. Lectins, carbohydrate-binding proteins, are known as anti-nociceptive and anti-inflammatory agents, had been detected in Caulerpa cupressoides var. lycopodium, collected from Pacheco in Brazil. Current analgesia-inducing drugs such as opioids and nonsteroidal anti-inflammatory drugs are not helpful in all cases because of their side effects and low potency, so the search for alternatives with minimal side effects began in Caulerpa cupressoides species.

In one research study, Caulerpa cupressoides lectins were injected in mice. When those lectins are injected 30 min prior to acetic acid, the mice inhibited writhing response in a dose-dependent manner; however, the antinociceptive effect was strongly reduced when lectins were combined with their binding sugar mucin, which on its own did not modify the nociceptive response induced by acetic acid.

One study conducted on rats demonstrated that the administration of Caulerpa cupressoides lectins has a potential antinociceptive and anti-inflammatory effect, with a mechanism that is partially dependent on TNF-α, IL-1β, COX-2 and ICAM-1 inhibition, and independent from the opioid system and NO/cGMP/PKG/K+ATP channel pathway.

The single dose of lectin from Caulerpa cupressoides injected over seven consecutive days in mice did not show any signs of toxicity; furthermore, the animal body weight and the weight of essential organs such as liver, kidney, or heart appeared normal suggesting that usage of such lectins could be safe for further analysis.
