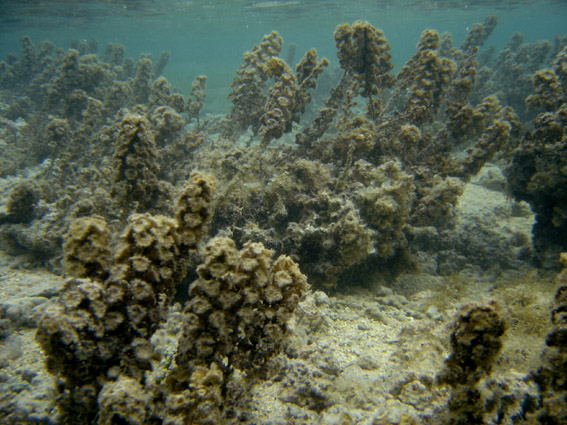
- Turbinaria ornata

Scientific classification
- Domain: Eukaryota
- Supergroup: Stramenopiles
- Division: Ochrophyta
- Class: Phaeophyceae
- Order: Fucales
- Family: Sargassaceae
- Genus: Turbinaria; J.V.Lamouroux, 1825

= Turbinaria (alga) =

Genus of seaweeds

Turbinaria, commonly known as turbanweed or turbinweed, is a genus of brown algae (Phaeophyceae) found primarily in tropical marine waters. It generally grows on rocky substrates. In tropical Turbinaria species that are often preferentially consumed by herbivorous fishes and echinoids (sea urchins), there is a relatively low level of phenolics and tannins.

== Description ==
Turbinaria is characterized by an upright thallus with radially branched axes bearing blades. It has a tough texture. The blades come in various forms described as stipitate, turbinate, crowned, and obpyramidal. Its appearance resembles that of a long pinecone. The thallus is kept upright by a holdfast consisting of spread out branches growing from the main axes. Mature thalli possess receptacles, their reproductive organs which branch out from the tips of the stalks on the blades.

=== Chemistry ===
Turbinaria contains fucoxanthin which is a carotenoid pigment found in all brown algae. Its functions lie in the harvesting of light and energy transfer. The genus has high levels of iron (893.7 ± 210.5 g^{−1} μg dry weight), and has an affinity for arsenic and nickel, depending on the concentrations in the environments in which they grow. It also has good potential for alginate production since it can yield up to 40% of its dry weight in alginate. Turbinaria also contains fucoidan, a sulfated polysaccharide with antioxidant, anti-inflammatory, and anticancer properties.

== Distribution ==
Turbinaria is mainly distributed in tropical coral reefs but is also found in the subtropics and temperate regions. Southeast Asia as well as the Indian Ocean contain the highest diversity of the genus. Turbinaria ornata is the species with the widest distribution within the genus, ranging from the West Atlantic, to the Indo-Pacific, and East Africa.

== Taxonomy ==
Classification of Turbinaria species is based on morphological characteristics including the shape of the leaves, vesicles, and receptacles, as well as the development of the axes. The genus has received comparatively lesser attention than other genera under Sargassaceae, and like many seaweeds, the large degree of phenotypic plasticity exhibited by different species has led to many taxonomic uncertainties. The use of molecular analyses has been useful in this regard.

=== Species ===
AlgaeBase lists 32 current species of Turbinaria.:

- Turbinaria capensis Pichon (considered as Turbinaria trialata var. capensis Kützing, 1860 by WoRMS)
- Turbinaria condensata Sonder, 1860
- Turbinaria conoides (J.Agardh) Kützing, 1860
  - Turbinaria conoides f. laticuspidata
  - Turbinaria conoides f. retroflexa
- Turbinaria costata E.S.Barton 1966
- Turbinaria crateriformis W.R.Taylor, 1966
- Turbinaria decurrens Bory de Saint-Vincent, 1828
- Turbinaria denudata Bory de Saint-Vincent, 1828
- Turbinaria elatensis W.R.Taylor, 1965
- Turbinaria filamentosa Yamada, 1925
- Turbinaria filiformis Yamada
- Turbinaria foliosa M.J.Wynne, 2002
- Turbinaria gracilis Sonder, 1845
- Turbinaria havanensis J.V.Lamouroux (nomen inquirenda per WoRMS)
- Turbinaria heterophylla Kützing, 1860
- Turbinaria indica Gopalakrishnan, 1974
- Turbinaria kenyaensis W.R.Taylor, 1966
- Turbinaria luzonensis W.R.Taylor, 1964
- Turbinaria membranacea Ruprecht (nomen inquirenda per WoRMS)
- Turbinaria murrayana E.S.Barton, 1891
- Turbinaria ornata (Turner) J.Agardh, 1848
  - Turbinaria ornata f. ecoronata
  - Turbinaria ornata f. evesiculosa
  - Turbinaria ornata f. hainanensis
  - Turbinaria ornata var. serrata
- Turbinaria papenfussii W.R.Taylor, 1964
- Turbinaria parvifolia C.K.Tseng & Lu, 1983
- Turbinaria swartzii (C. Agardh) Yendo, 1905
- Turbinaria tanzaniensis Jaasund, 1976
- Turbinaria tetraedra Ruprecht (nomen inquirenda per WoRMS)
- Turbinaria thunbergii (Mertens ex Roth) Yendo, 1905
- Turbinaria trialata (J. Agardh) Kützing, 1860
- Turbinaria tricostata E.S.Barton, 1891
  - Turbinaria tricostata var. weberae
- Turbinaria triquetra (J.Agardh) Kützing, 1849
- Turbinaria turbinata (Linnaeus) Kuntze, 1898 (type species)
- Turbinaria vulgaris J.Agardh, 1848

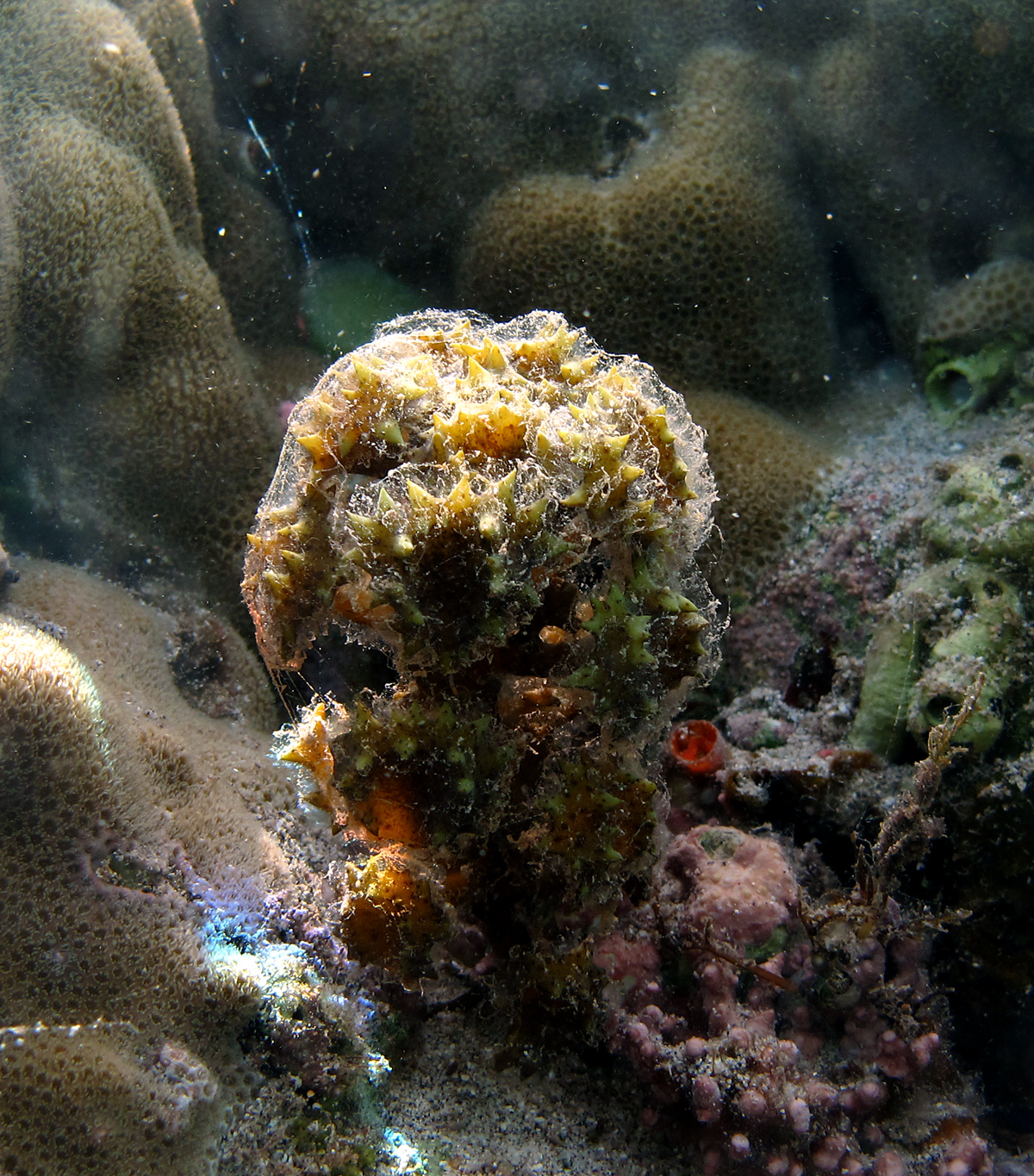
Turbinaria ornata

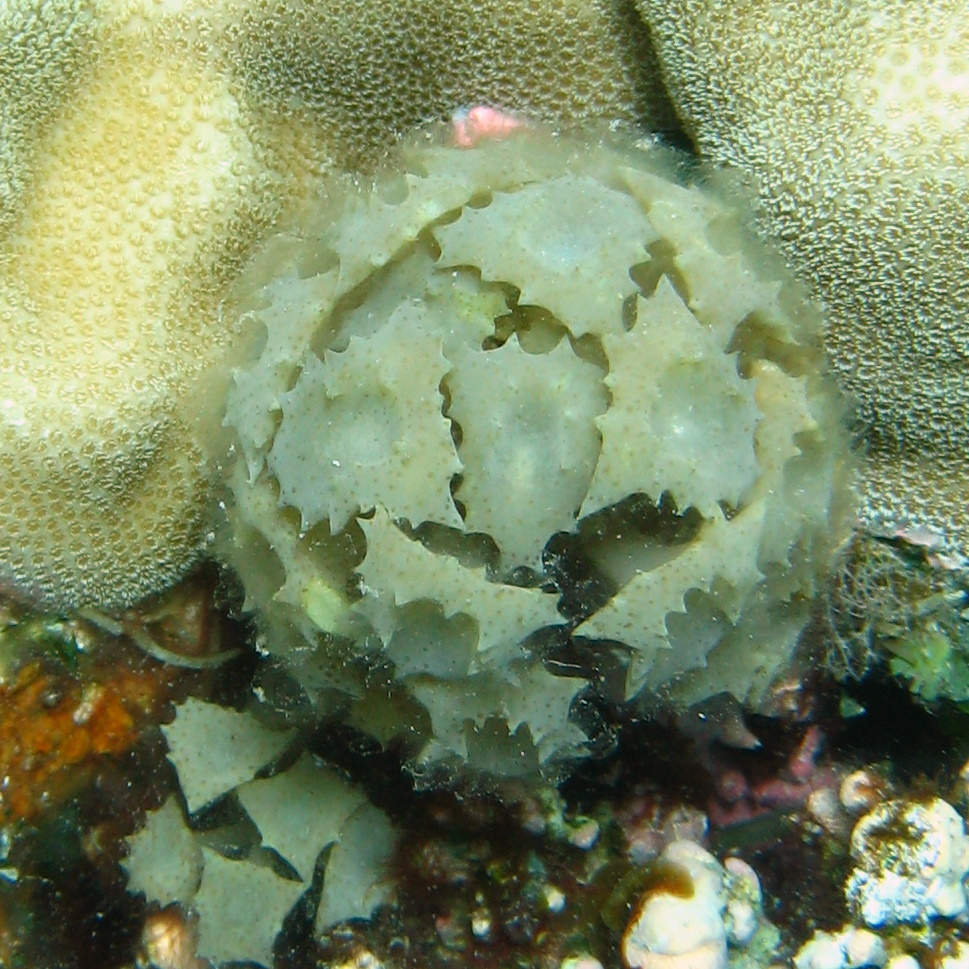
Turbinaria triquetra

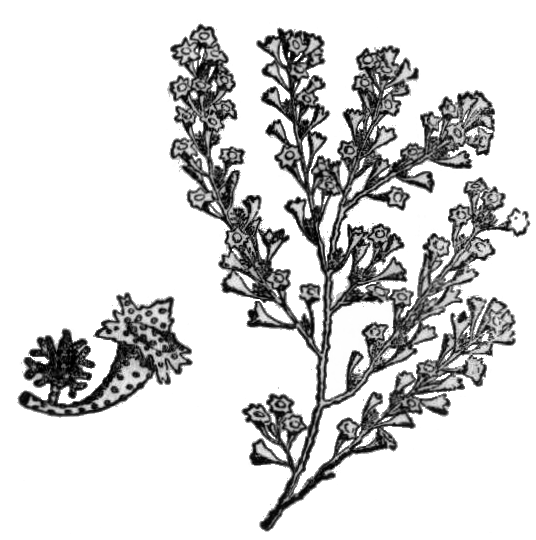
Turbinaria gracilis

== Ecology ==
The genus can survive in various habitats such as tide pools, rocky intertidal zones, and forereefs, as well as up to depths of 30 m (98 ft), as well as in habitats will varying levels of exposure. They have adapted different forms to suit their environments; thalli in habitats with high wave action tend to be shorter, tougher, and not buoyant which helps them withstand the harsh conditions. On the other hand, thalli in more sheltered habitats are longer, with weaker tissue, and develop buoyancy with sexual maturity.

Turbinaria is one of the principal genera of macroalgae that have been observed to take over degraded reefs following losses in hard coral cover. One of the reasons for this is that it has a higher thermal tolerance than some coral species giving it a competitive advantage during periods of high temperatures. Its thalli can also cause abrasions on corals which can lead to death.

== Life History ==
Species like Turbinaria ornata are monoecious and reproduce both sexually and asexually. The life cycle begins with a diploid thallus which releases haploid gametes which develop in its receptacles which contain oogonia for eggs, and antheridia for antherozoids. Fertilization occurs at the tip of the receptacle which results in a diploid zygote. Asexual reproduction occurs via fragmentation and dispersal. Dispersal occurs in two modes: short ( < 1 m) and long distance (kms).

== Relation to humans ==
Harvesting of Turbinaria is largely done by collecting drifting thalli on the water surface or directly from the substratum. The genus is commonly harvested in India, Indonesia, and the Philippines for alginate production. It is abundant year-round in French Polynesia and India, and is harvested seasonally in Indonesia.

=== Utilization ===
Turbinaria is utilized for its alginate extracts, which are used as thickening, gelling, and stabilizing agents in food and drinks, as well as in cosmetics and pharmaceutical products. The young thalli of Turbinaria ornata are consumed in Indonesia either fresh, salted, or with curry sauce. Dried Turbinaria can be ground and used as seasoning. In Samoa, it is used as a stir-fry ingredient. Brown algae are often used in animal feed as they can provide nutritional supplements and improve growth. A study found that freshwater prawn (Macrobrachium rosenbergii) feeds containing T. ornata supplements lead to increased growth, survival, and digestion. Turbinaria is also used as fertilizer in many Asian countries. and pesticides

Turbinaria is still chemically and pharmacologically underexplored. The therapeutic potential of pure compounds isolated from Turbinaria are promising as antiproliferative, antipyretic, anti-inflammatory immunostimulatory, anti-diabetic, anti-obesity, antiviral, antimicrobial, cardioprotective, hepatoprotective, and hypolipidemic. Those activities are represented by diverse classes of compounds including sterols, amino acids, fatty acids, alcohols, halocarbons, hydrocarbons, carbohydrates, esters, and cyclic tetrapyrrole compounds.

The genus has shown promise as a way of removing lead from aqueous solutions.
