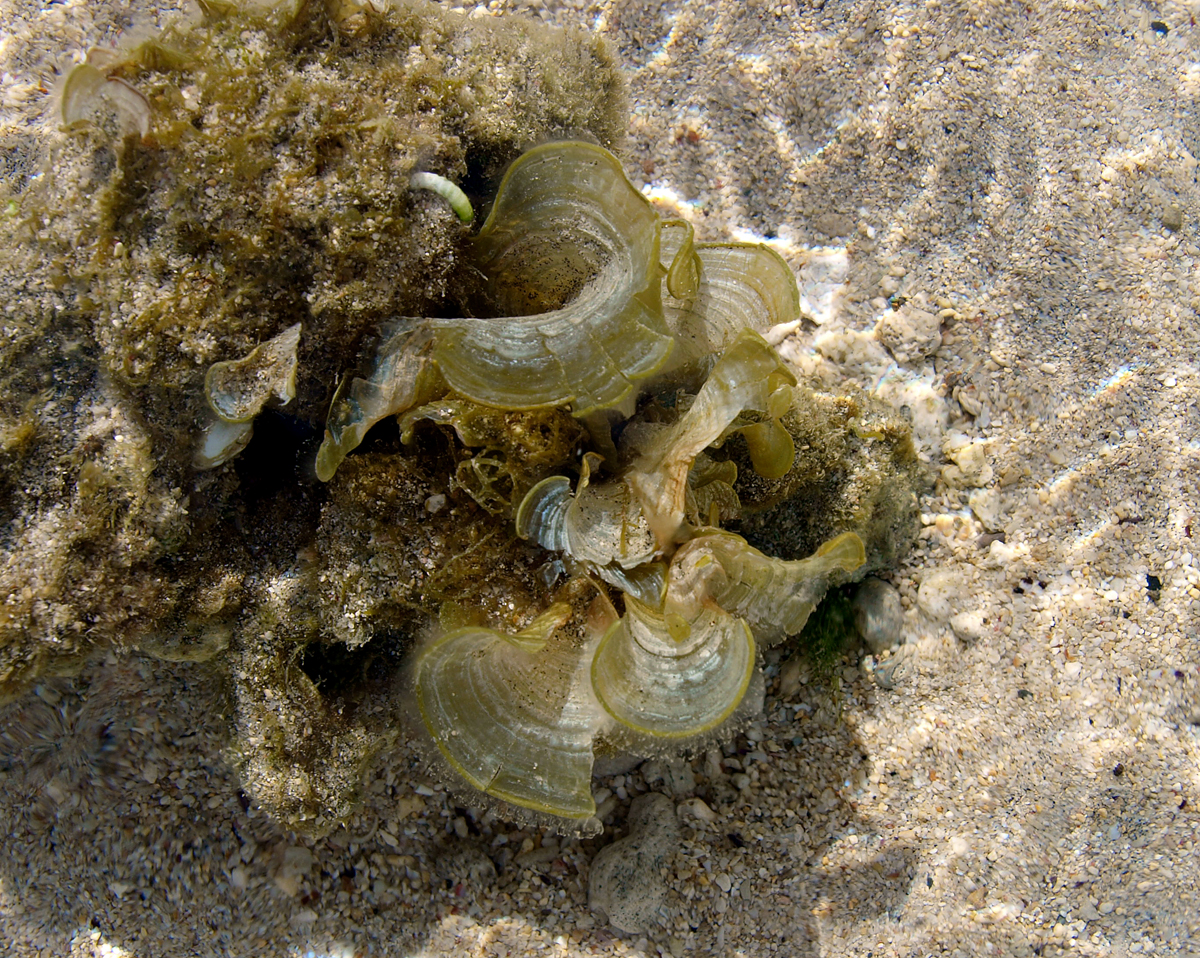

Scientific classification
- Domain: Eukaryota
- Clade: Sar
- Clade: Stramenopiles
- Division: Ochrophyta
- Class: Phaeophyceae
- Order: Dictyotales
- Family: Dictyotaceae
- Genus: Padina
- Species: P. boryana

Binomial name
- Padina boryana Thivy, 1966

= Padina boryana =

Species of alga

Padina boryana is a species of brown algae. The name is an honorific for Jean-Baptiste Bory de Saint-Vincent and the identification is credited to phycologist Dr. Francesca Thivy. Although it was first identified in the Indo-Pacific, P. boryana has also been recorded in the Mediterranean.
