= List of Galapagos Islands species extinct in the Holocene =

List of extinct species

Map of the Galápagos Islands

This is a list of Galápagos Islands species extinct in the Holocene that covers extinctions from the Holocene epoch, a geologic epoch that began about 11,650 years before present (about 9700 BCE) (Note: The source gives "11,700 calendar yr b2k (before CE 2000)". But "BP" means "before CE 1950". Therefore, the Holocene began 11,650 BP. Doing the math, that is c. 9700 BCE.) and continues to the present day.

This list includes species that have gone extinct from the Galápagos Islands, an island archipelago belonging to Ecuador.

Many species have disappeared from the Galápagos Islands as part of the ongoing Holocene extinction, driven by human activity.

== Mammals (class Mammalia) ==
=== Rodents (order Rodentia) ===
==== Hamsters, voles, lemmings, muskrats, and New World rats and mice (family Cricetidae) ====
Common name	Scientific name	Range	Comments	Pictures
Galápagos giant rat	Megaoryzomys curioi	Santa Cruz	Most recent remains dated to 1520-1950. Possibly extinct by introduced predators like feral dogs, cats, pigs, and black rats.	
Isabela giant rat	Megaoryzomys sp.	Isabela	Most recent remains dated to 1515-1950.	
Darwin's Galápagos mouse	Nesoryzomys darwini	Santa Cruz	Last recorded in 1930. Extinct due to competition, pathogens transmitted by, or predation by black rats, house mice, brown rats, and feral cats.	
Indefatigable Galápagos mouse	Nesoryzomys indefessus	Santa Cruz and Baltra	Last collected in 1934. Extinct due to competition, pathogens transmitted by, or predation by black rats, house mice, brown rats, and feral cats.	
	Nesoryzomys spp.	Isabela	Two different unnamed species, associated with anthropogenically introduced mammalian species in archaeological sites.	
	Nesoryzomys sp.	Rábida	Most recent remains dated to 4771-4316 BCE.	

== Birds (class Aves) ==
=== Perching birds (order Passeriformes) ===
==== Tanagers (family Thraupidae) ====
Common name	Scientific name	Range	Comments	Pictures
Darwin's ground finch	Geospiza magnirostris magnirostris	Floreana and San Cristóbal	Only recorded alive by Charles Darwin in 1835. It was restricted to the lowlands which were the most affected by human settlement starting in 1832; introduced donkeys, cattle, and goats reduced the Opuntia cacti it fed and nested on, while dogs, cats, and rats predated on the birds.	

==== Tyrant flycatchers (family Tyrannidae) ====
Common name	Scientific name	Range	Comments
San Cristóbal flycatcher	Pyrocephalus dubius	San Cristóbal	Last recorded in 1987. Likely extinct due to predation by introduced rats, the avian vampire fly, or avian pox.

== Reptiles (class Reptilia) ==
=== Turtles and tortoises (order Testudines) ===
==== Tortoises (family Testudinidae) ====
Common name	Scientific name	Range	Comments	Pictures
Pinta Island tortoise	Chelonoidis niger abingdonii	Pinta	The last known individual (Lonesome George) was captured in 1972 and died in Santa Cruz's Tortoise Center in 2012, but hybrid descendants survive in northern Isabela Island. Declined due to hunting and habitat destruction by grazing feral goats.	
Floreana giant tortoise	Chelonoidis niger niger	Floreana	Disappeared from the wild in the mid-19th century, though hybrids survive in captivity and in northern Isabela Island. Likely extinct due to hunting and the impact of introduced mammals including pigs, dogs, cats, goats, donkeys, cattle, black rats and house mice.	
Santa Fe Island tortoise	Chelonoidis niger 'Santa Fe Island'	Santa Fe	Undescribed lineage, known from subfossil bones.	
Rabida Island tortoise	Chelonoidis nigra wallacei	Rabida	Hypothetical subspecies based on tracks seen in 1897 and a single individual collected in 1906 but not preserved. No logs from whaling or sealing vessels make mention of collecting at Rabida, which has a good anchorage and a corral nearby in which tortoises, perhaps from other islands, were temporarily held. The type specimen is of unknown provenance and was assigned to Rabida because it resembled the 1906 individual. The Reptile Database considers it synonymous with Chelonoidis niger guentheri.	

===== Extinct in the wild =====
Common name	Scientific name	Range	Comments	Pictures
Fernandina Island tortoise	Chelonoidis niger phantasticus	Fernandina	Considered extinct after the only known individual, a male, was killed in 1906. An elderly female was discovered in 2019 and transferred to a breeding center.	

== Ray-finned fish (class Actinopterygii) ==
=== Ovalentaria incertae sedis ===
==== Family Pomacentridae ====
===== Possibly extinct =====
Common name	Scientific name	Range	Comments	Pictures
Galápagos damsel	Azurina eupalama	Galápagos Islands	Last recorded during the 1982-83 El Niño event, which warmed the waters it inhabited and killed off the plankton on which it fed.	

== Copepods (class Copepoda) ==
=== Order Calanoida ===
==== Family Diaptomidae ====
Common name	Range	Comments
Mastigodiaptomus galapagoensis	El Junco, San Cristóbal Island	Last recorded in 2004. Likely wiped out after the introduction of invasive tilapias to El Junco in 2005.

== Starfishes (class Asteroidea) ==
=== Order Forcipulatida ===
==== Family Heliasteridae ====
===== Possibly extinct =====
Common name	Scientific name	Range	Comments	Pictures
24-rayed sunstar	Heliaster solaris	Galápagos Islands	Last recorded during the 1982-83 El Niño event.	

== Brown algae (class Phaeophyceae) ==
=== Order Desmarestiales ===
==== Acid weeds (family Desmarestiaceae) ====
===== Possibly extinct =====
Common name	Scientific name	Range	Comments	Pictures
Tropical acidweed	Desmarestia tropica	Post Office Bay, Floreana; and Caleta Tagus, Isabela	Last recorded in 1972. As a cold water species with a limited range, it could have been wiped out by the 1982-1983 El Niño event.	

=== Order Fucales ===
==== Family Sargassaceae ====
===== Possibly extinct =====
Common name	Scientific name	Range	Comments	Pictures
Galapagos stringweed	Bifurcaria galapagensis	Galápagos Islands	Last recorded during the 1982-83 El Niño event.	

== Red algae (division Rhodophyta) ==
=== Order Nemaliales ===
==== Family Galaxauraceae ====
===== Possibly extinct =====
Scientific name	Range	Comments
Galaxaura barbata	Galápagos Islands	Known from three individuals collected in Post Office Bay, Floreana in 1934; Santa Cruz in 1945, and Tortuga Bay in 1962.

=== Order Ceramiales ===
==== Family Delesseriaceae ====
===== Possibly extinct =====
Scientific name	Range	Comments
Phycodrina elegans	Galápagos Islands	Last collected in 1977.

== Plants (kingdom Plantae) ==
=== Order Asterales ===
==== Sunflowers (family Asteraceae) ====
Scientific name	Range	Comments
Delilia inelegans	Floreana	Only known from the type collected by Charles Darwin in 1835.

=== Order Caryophyllales ===
==== Amaranths (family Amaranthaceae) ====
Common name	Scientific name	Range	Comments
Galapagos amaranth	Gomphrena rigida	Santiago	Last collected in 1906. Possibly exterminated by introduced goats.

=== Order Cucurbitales ===
==== Gourds (family Cucurbitaceae) ====
Common name	Scientific name	Range	Comments
Pepino de Galápagos	Sicyos villosus	Floreana	Only recorded by Charles Darwin in 1835.
