= Gloiotrichus =

Scientific classification
- Clade: Archaeplastida
- Division: Rhodophyta
- Class: Florideophyceae
- Order: Nemaliales
- Family: Liagoraceae
- Genus: Gloiotrichus

Genus of algae

Gloiotrichus is a genus of red algae, from the Liagoraceae family, characterised by its particularly mucilaginous thalli. It forms a pyramidal shape due to its vegetative structural development, the thalli being composed of several terete main axes with lateral branches similar in structure. The species is characterised by "the development of sterile filaments on the elongate carpogonial branches that have the appearance of normal cortical filaments."

It has one known species, Gloiotrichus fractalis, found only in the Houtman Abrolhos in Western Australia.

== See also ==
- Algae
- Red algae
- Algae eater
