= Nesoryzomys swarthi =

Conservation status
- Vulnerable (IUCN 3.1)

Scientific classification
- Kingdom: Animalia
- Phylum: Chordata
- Class: Mammalia
- Order: Rodentia
- Family: Cricetidae
- Subfamily: Sigmodontinae
- Genus: Nesoryzomys
- Species: N. swarthi

Binomial name
- Nesoryzomys swarthi Orr, 1938

Species of rodent

Nesoryzomys swarthi, also known as the Santiago nesoryzomys or Santiago Galápagos mouse, is a species of rodent in the genus Nesoryzomys of family Cricetidae. It is found only on Santiago in the Galápagos Islands. Its natural habitat is subtropical or tropical dry shrubland.

It was considered extinct since it was last recorded in 1906, but it was rediscovered in 1997. A smaller, related rice rat was also rediscovered—the Fernandina rice rat (N. fernandinae) on Fernandina.
