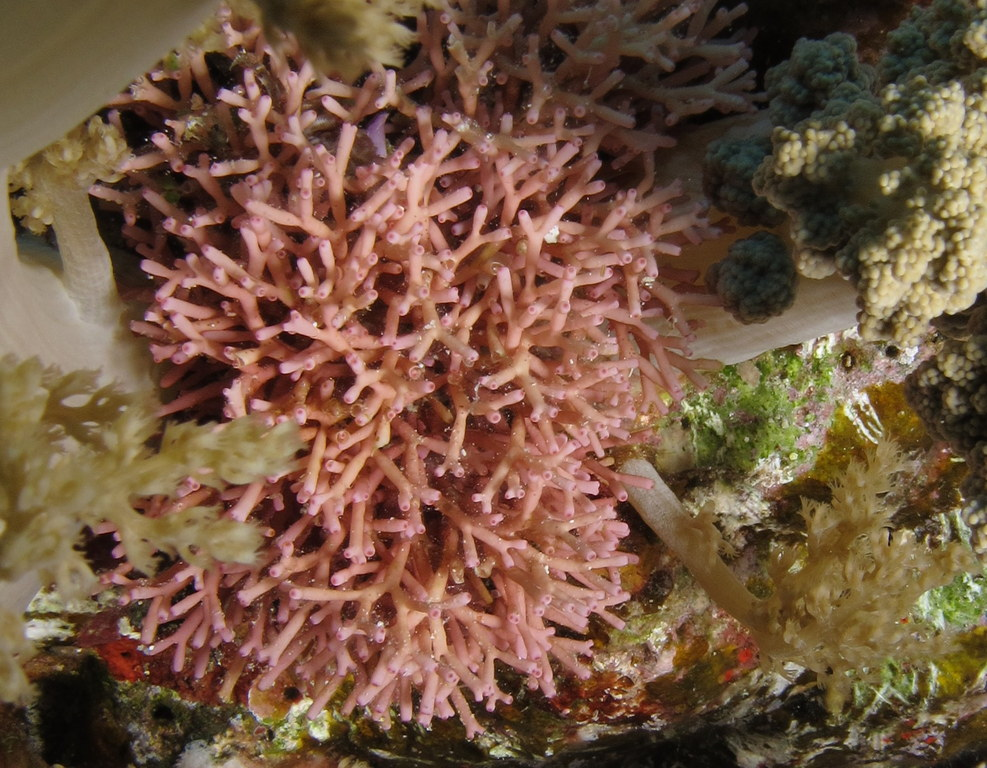

Scientific classification
- Clade: Archaeplastida
- Division: Rhodophyta
- Class: Florideophyceae
- Order: Nemaliales
- Family: Galaxauraceae
- Genus: Galaxaura
- Species: G. rugosa

Binomial name
- Galaxaura rugosa (J.Ellis & Solander) J.V.Lamouroux, 1816

Synonyms
- Corallina rugosa, J.Ellis & Solander, 1786, among many others

= Galaxaura rugosa =

Species of alga

Galaxaura rugosa is a species of red algae in the family Galaxauraceae. The species is the type species of its genus, Galaxaura. The species is found in the Pacific and Indian oceans, Gulf of Mexico, Caribbean Sea, and Macaronesia.
