= Nesoryzomys =

Scientific classification
- Kingdom: Animalia
- Phylum: Chordata
- Class: Mammalia
- Order: Rodentia
- Family: Cricetidae
- Subfamily: Sigmodontinae
- Tribe: Oryzomyini
- Genus: Nesoryzomys; Heller, 1904

Type species
- Nesoryzomys narboroughi

Species
- Nesoryzomys fernandinae Nesoryzomys narboroughi Nesoryzomys swarthi †Nesoryzomys darwini †Nesoryzomys indefessus

Genus of rodents

Nesoryzomys is a genus of rodent in the tribe Oryzomyini of family Cricetidae, endemic to the Galápagos Islands. Five species have been described, with two of them considered extinct.

Other rodents restricted to the Galápagos include Megaoryzomys curioi and Aegialomys galapagoensis.
