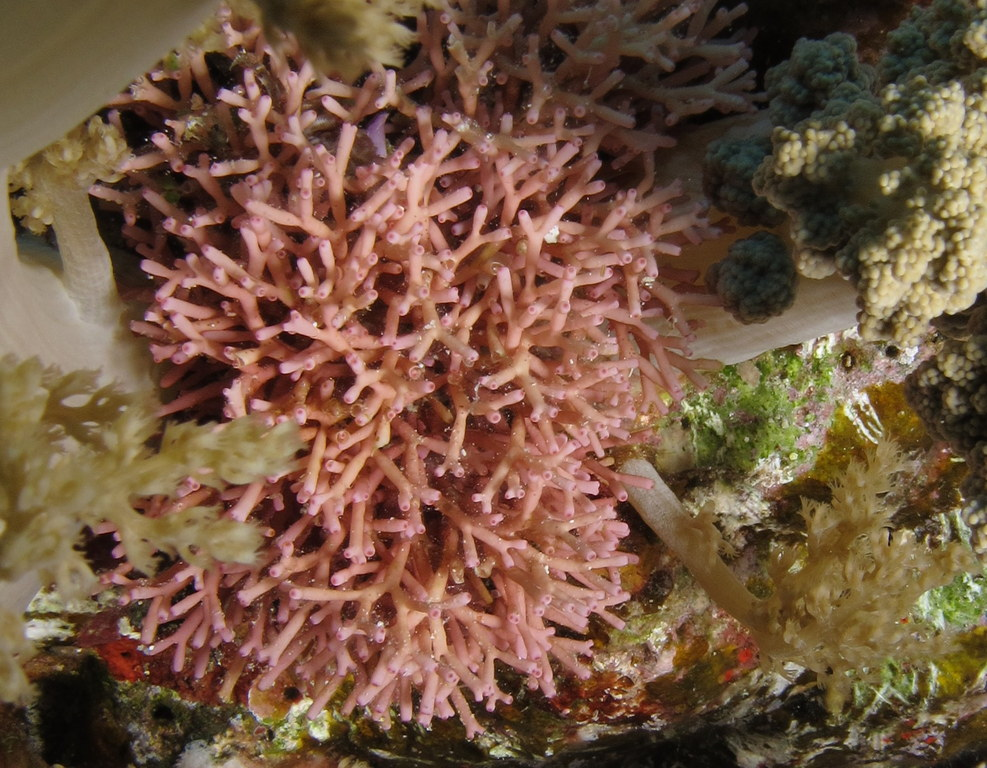
- Red seaweed, Galaxaura rugosa

Scientific classification
- Domain: Eukaryota
- Clade: Archaeplastida
- Division: Rhodophyta
- Class: Florideophyceae
- Order: Nemaliales
- Family: Galaxauraceae
- Genus: Galaxaura; J.V. Lamouroux, 1812

= Galaxaura =

Genus of algae

Galaxaura is a genus of thalloid red algae.

Dichotomous branches are formed; the medulla has a filamentous construction. It may be related to the fossil Gymnocodiaceae.

The genus has cosmopolitan distribution.

== Species ==
As accepted by WoRMS and AlgaeBase;

- Galaxaura articulata T.Tanaka
- Galaxaura barbata R.Chou
- Galaxaura beckeri Schmitz ex Mazza
- Galaxaura contigua Kjellman
- Galaxaura dichotoma J.V.Lamouroux
- Galaxaura divaricata (Linnaeus) Huisman & R.A.Townsend
- Galaxaura elegans T.Tanaka
- Galaxaura elongata J.Agardh
- Galaxaura filamentosa R.C.Y.Chou
- Galaxaura glabriuscula Kjellman
- Galaxaura hawaiiana Butters
- Galaxaura indica Huisman, G.H.Boo & S.M.Boo
- Galaxaura infirma Kjellman
- Galaxaura kjellmanii Weber Bosse
- Galaxaura latifolia T.Tanaka
- Galaxaura magna Kjellman
- Galaxaura pacifica Tanaka
- Galaxaura paschalis Børgesen
- Galaxaura rugosa (J.Ellis & Solander) J.V.Lamouroux
- Galaxaura scinaioides Heydrich
- Galaxaura spongiosa Kützing
- Galaxaura striata Kjellman
- Galaxaura tissotii Weber Bosse
- Galaxaura yamadae Itono

There are plenty of former Galaxaura species that are now synonyms of other genera.
