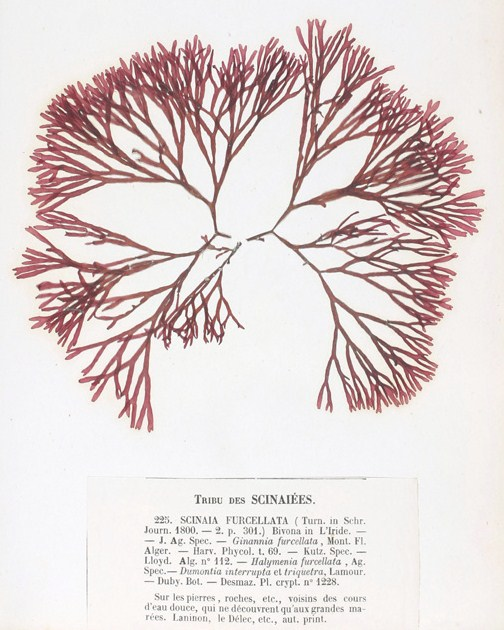
- Scinaia furcellata

Scientific classification
- Clade: Archaeplastida
- Division: Rhodophyta
- Class: Florideophyceae
- Order: Nemaliales
- Suborder: Galaxaurineae
- Family: Scinaiaceae; J.M. Huisman, J.T. Harper & G.W. Saunders 2004

Genera
- See text

= Scinaiaceae =

Family of algae

Scinaiaceae is a family of red algae (Rhodophyta) in the order Nemaliales.

Huisman had placed former members of Galaxauraceae family, that were lacking lime into his new family of Scinaiaceae.

== Distribution ==
The family has cosmopolitan distribution. Including being found in India, Arabian Sea, Brazil, North America (including Alaska, British Columbia, Washington, and Oregon) Chile, New Zealand (Tasmania and Campbell Island) and the Falkland Islands.

== Notes ==
Molecular analyses of DNA on species of Nothogenia has been carried out to determine species relationships.

Most Scinaiaceae species produce mucilage (thick, gluey substance) mainly in the cortical layer.

Several species in the Scinaiaceae family (including Nothogenia fastigiata and Scinaia hatei) have been screened for anti-viral activity (against herpes, Respiratory syncytial virus (RSV), Influenzavirus A, Influenzavirus B and simian immunodeficiency viruses). Sulfated polysaccharides (xylomannans) from the red alga, have inhibitory effects.

== List of genera ==
According to the AlgaeBase (amount of species per genus);

- Gloiophloea J.Agardh - 3 spp.
- Nothogenia Montagne - 10 spp.
- Scinaia Bivona-Bernardi - 45 spp.
- Whidbeyella Setchell & N.L.Gardner - 1 sp. Whidbeyella cartilaginea

Former genera; Ginannia Montagne, Haloderma Ruprecht, Myelomium Kützing, Pseudogloiophloea Levring and Rhodosaccion (J.Agardh) Montagne.
