= Dotyophycus =

Scientific classification
- Clade: Archaeplastida
- Division: Rhodophyta
- Class: Florideophyceae
- Order: Nemaliales
- Family: Liagoraceae
- Genus: Dotyophycus; I.A.Abbott, 1976

Genus of algae

Dotyophycus is a genus of red algae, from the family Liagoraceae, characterised by a "terete, dichotomously divided, calcified thallus." It can be recognised by its reproductive features, particularly the gonimoblast that follows fertilization and the absence of sterile cells in mature cystocarp. Visually it is distinguished by its "almost creamy-white" appearance derived from its outer mucilage and calcification.
