= Galaxaura barbata =

Conservation status
- Critically endangered, possibly extinct (IUCN 3.1)

Scientific classification
- Domain: Eukaryota
- Clade: Archaeplastida
- Division: Rhodophyta
- Class: Florideophyceae
- Order: Nemaliales
- Family: Galaxauraceae
- Genus: Galaxaura
- Species: G. barbata

Binomial name
- Galaxaura barbata R. Chou, 1945

Species of thalloid alga

Galaxaura barbata is a species of Pacific marine algae belonging to the family Galaxauraceae. It is a critically endangered plant.

== Distribution ==
It was located at Post Office Bay, Isla Santa María, Galápagos Islands.

== Taxonomy ==
It was named by Ruth Chen-Ying Chou in "Pacific marine algae of the Allan Hancock Expeditions to the Galapagos Islands." Allan Hancock Pacific Expeditions 12: i-iv
