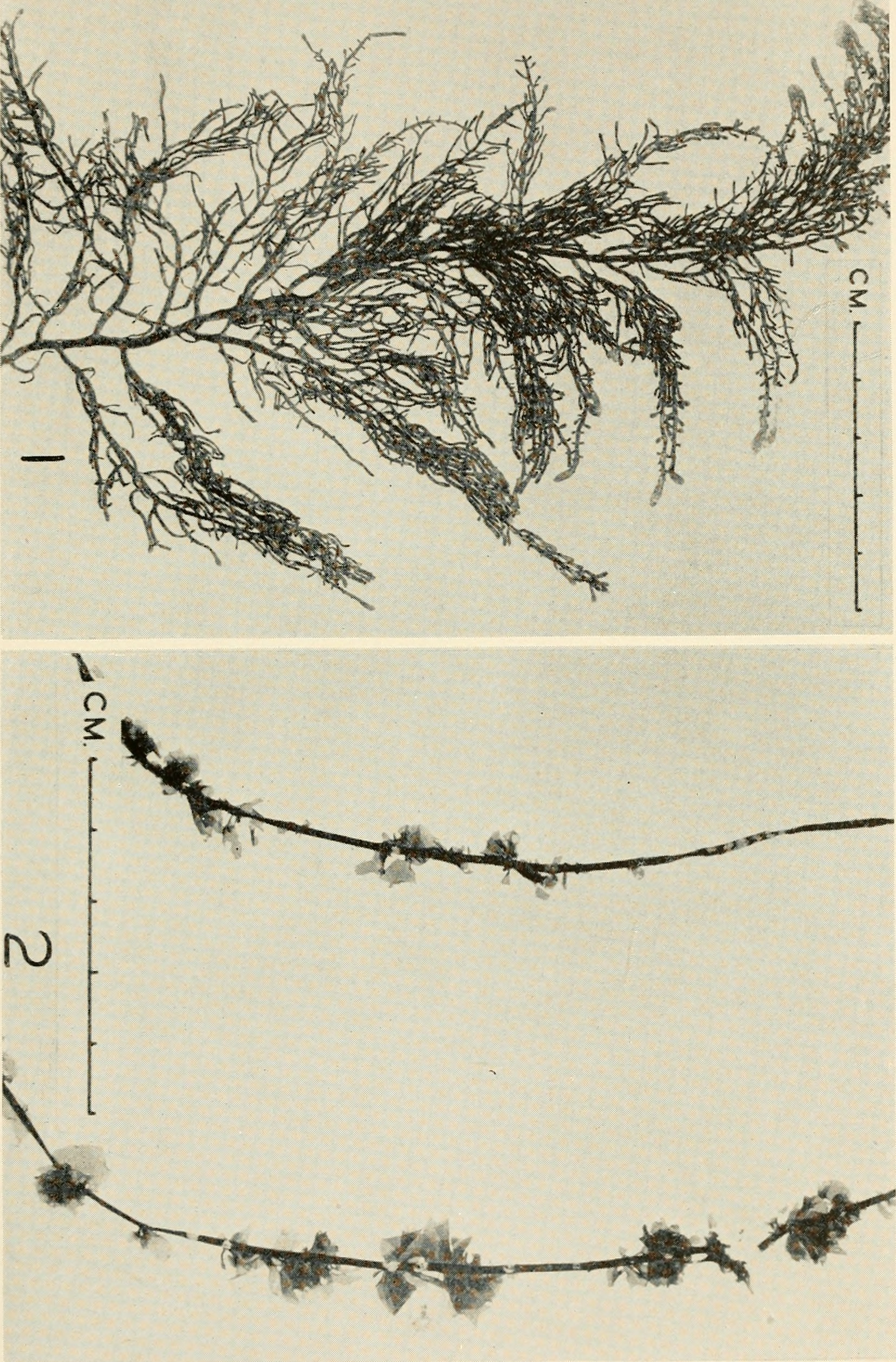

Scientific classification
- Domain: Eukaryota
- Clade: Archaeplastida
- Division: Rhodophyta
- Class: Florideophyceae
- Order: Nemaliales
- Family: Liagoraceae
- Genus: Ganonema

= Ganonema =

Genus of algae

Ganonema is a genus of red algae, from the Liagoraceae family, characterised by its dichotomously branched, multiaxial thalli, with terete axes." It is closely related to Liagora, but can be distinguished in two important respects. Its vegetative structure is distinct, as the basal cells of its cortical fascicles are isodiametric, whereas the cells of Liagora are elongate. Also, its reproductive development features "the occasional production of carpogonial branches in clusters and the production of spermatangia in dense heads."

== Species ==
Species in this genus include:

- Ganonema codii
- Ganonema farinosum

== See also ==
- Algae
- Red algae
- Algae eater
