= Xylomannan =

Xylomannan is an antifreeze molecule, found in the freeze-tolerant Alaskan beetle Upis ceramboides. Unlike antifreeze proteins, xylomannan is not a protein. Instead, it is a combination of a sugar (saccharide) and a fatty acid that is found in cell membranes. As such is expected to work in a different manner than AFPs. It is believed to work by incorporating itself directly into the cell membrane and preventing the freezing of water molecules within the cell.

Xylomannan is also found in the red seaweed Nothogenia fastigiata (Scinaiaceae family). Fraction F6 of a sulphated xylomannan from Nothogenia fastigiata was found to inhibit replication of a variety of viruses, including Herpes simplex virus types 1 and 2 (HSV-1, HSV-2), Human cytomegalovirus (HCMV, HHV-5), Respiratory syncytial virus (RSV), Influenzavirus A, Influenzavirus B, Junin and Tacaribe virus, Simian immunodeficiency virus, and (weakly) Human immunodeficiency virus types 1 and 2.
