= El Junco =

- Laguna El Junco (Spanish)
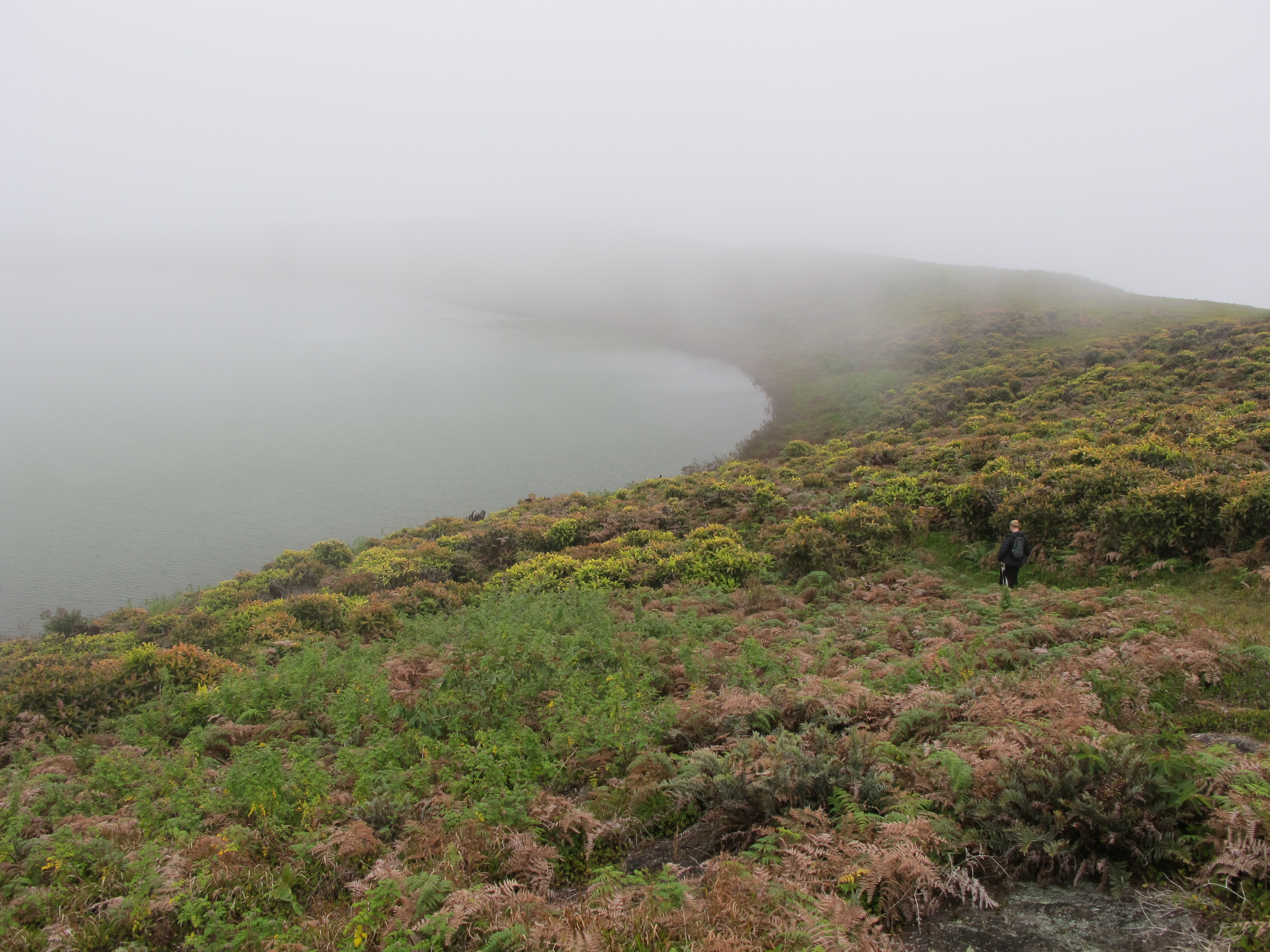
- El Junco Lagoon

- Location within Galápagos Islands
- Location: San Cristobal, Galapagos Islands
- Coordinates: 0°53′43″S 89°28′48″W
- Type: Volcanic crater lake
- Primary inflows: Rainfall
- Primary outflows: None (evaporation)
- Max. width: 300 m (980 ft)
- Surface area: 60,000 m^{2} (650,000 sq ft)
- Average depth: 4 m (13 ft)
- Max. depth: 6 m (20 ft)
- Water volume: 360,000 m^{3} (13,000,000 cu ft)
- Shore length^{1}: 270 m (890 ft)
- Surface elevation: 700 m (2,300 ft)
- Islands: None
- ^{1} Shore length is not a well-defined measure.

El Junco Lagoon is a lake in the highlands of San Cristóbal Island in the Galápagos Islands. Despite the name, it is a volcanic crater lake rather than a lagoon.

== History ==
El Junco inhabits a crater formed by the collapsed caldera of a volcano. Research has indicated the lake to have been extant since the end of the last ice age. The name El Junco is Spanish for sedge which is endemic to the islands.

During World War II, American forces stationed at the military base on Baltra Island utilized El Junco as a primary source of water, due to it being the closest available source of freshwater.

The lake is managed by the Galapagos National Park Service.

=== Flooding ===
Due to the lake's lack of a permanent outflow, heavy rains can cause the lake to breach its banks. Several flood incidents, often corresponding to El Nino, have been recorded. Flooding in 1978 led to an outflow being recorded at 5,400 US gal (20,000 L; 4,500 imp gal) per hour. Similar events in 1978 and 1998 caused serious damage to the nearby Puerto Baquerizo Park.

== Ecology ==
=== Flora ===
The name El Junco is a reference to the endemic sedge (Cyperus anderssonii) which can be found growing close to the lake. Additionally, the endangered Galapagos miconia (Miconia robinsoniana) can be found in the highlands surrounding the lake. Only two populations are known to occur in the wild, the other being in the highlands of nearby Santa Cruz island.

=== Fauna ===
Many species of birds inhabit the lake area including the endemic San Cristóbal mockingbird and white-cheeked pintail. Due to its status as an isolated source of fresh water, it is also one of the few places to witness frigatebirds preening their feathers.

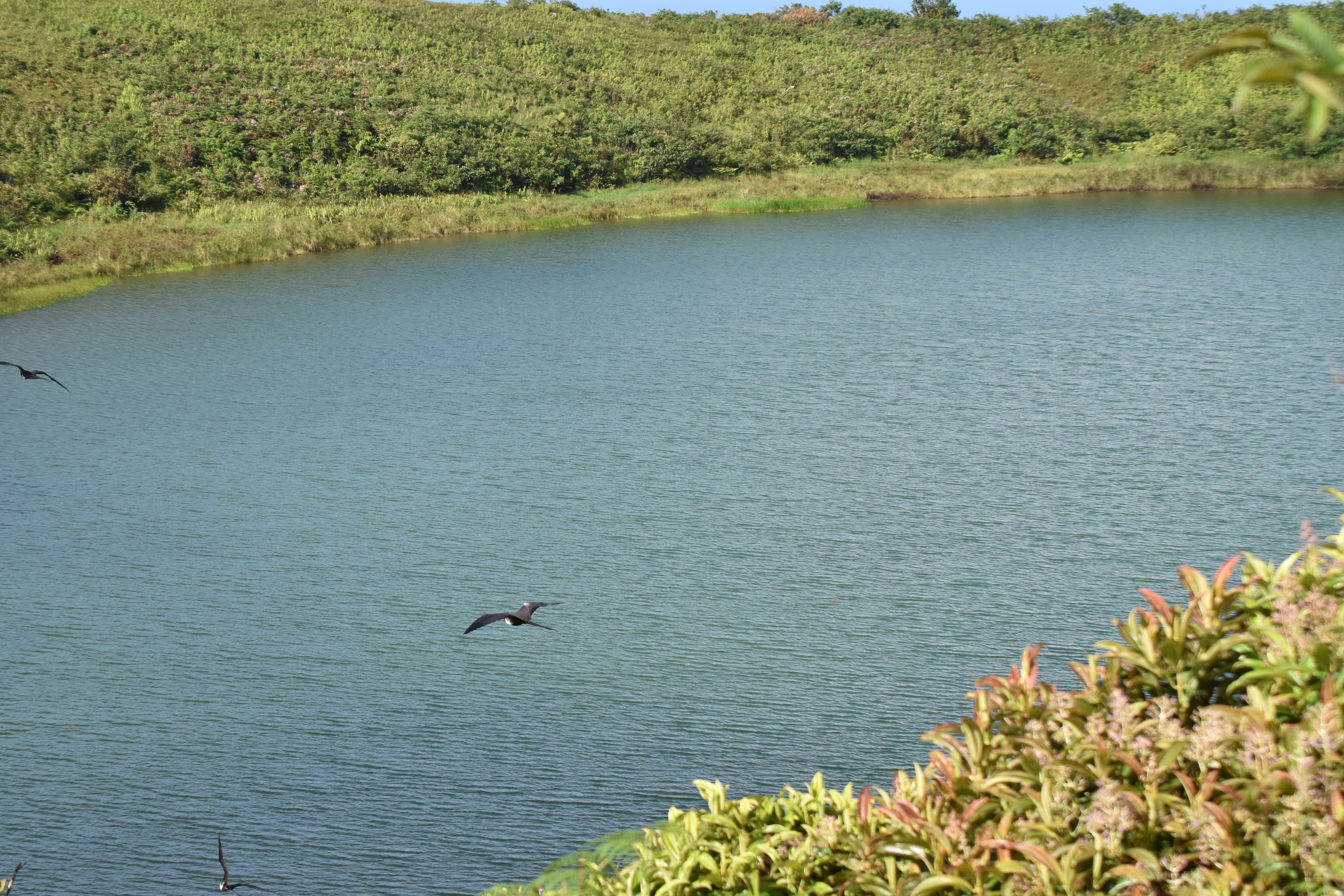
frigatebirds circle above Laguna El Junco

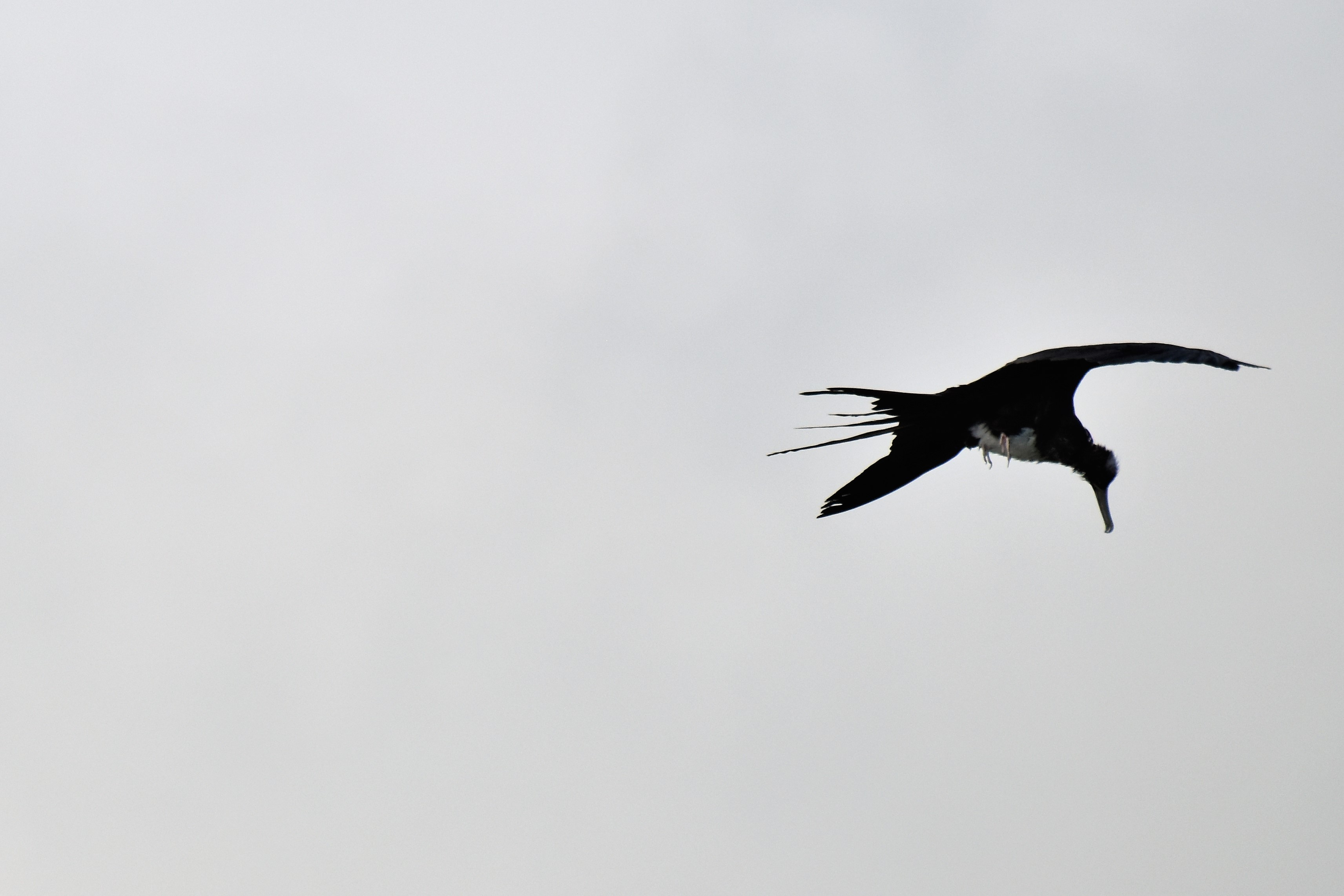
frigatebird probes Laguna El Junco

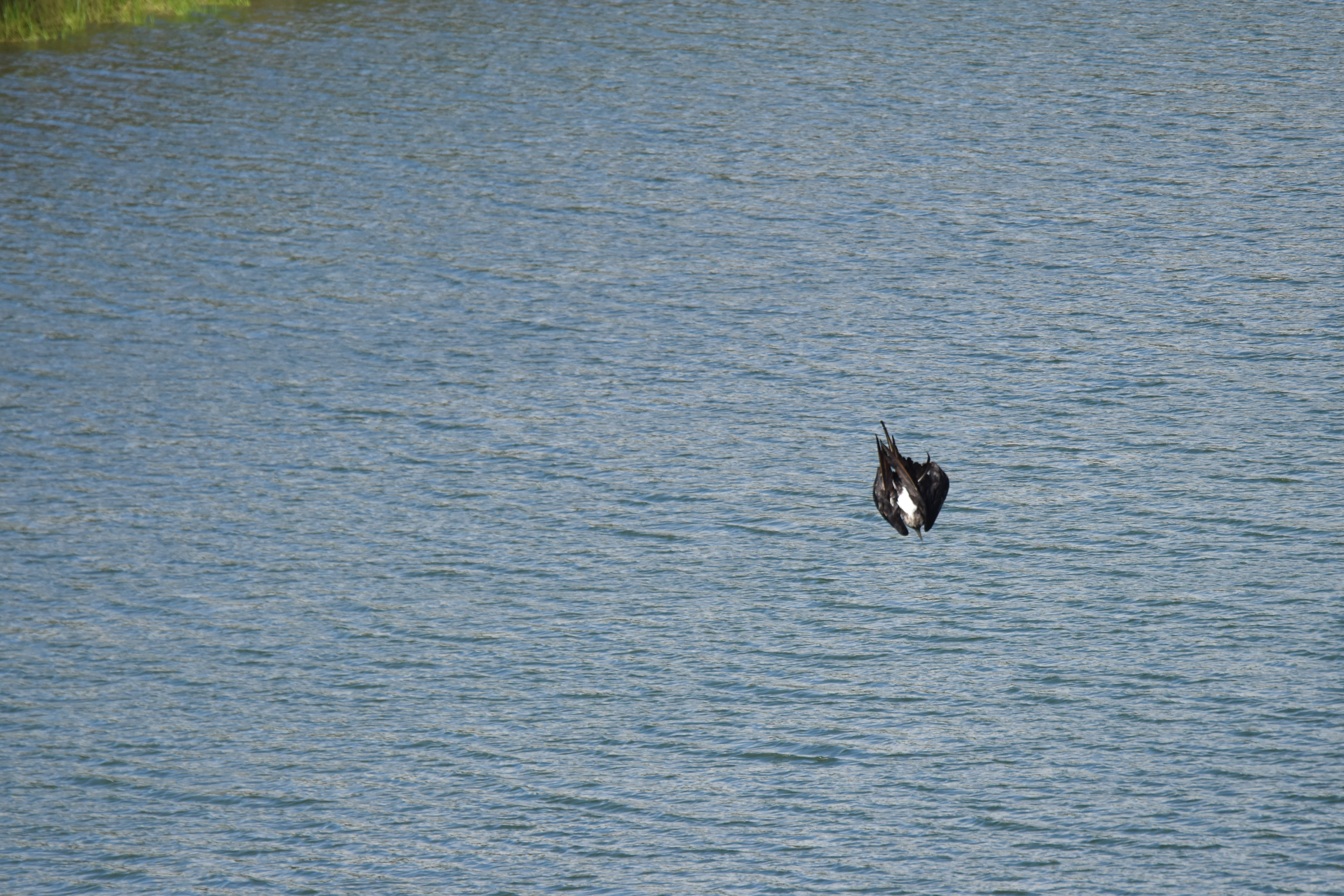
frigatebird plunges into Laguna El Junco

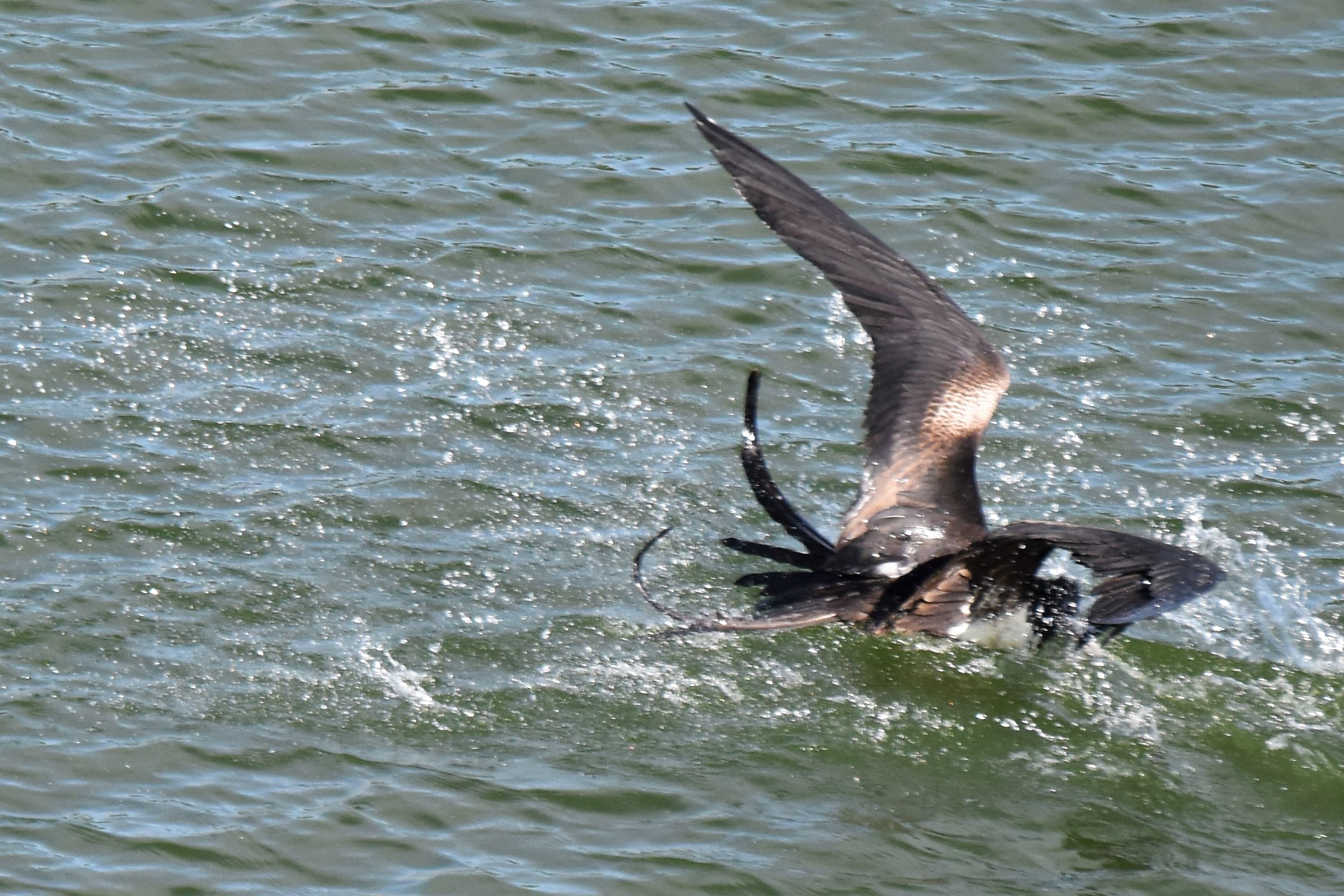
frigatebird waters in Laguna El Junco

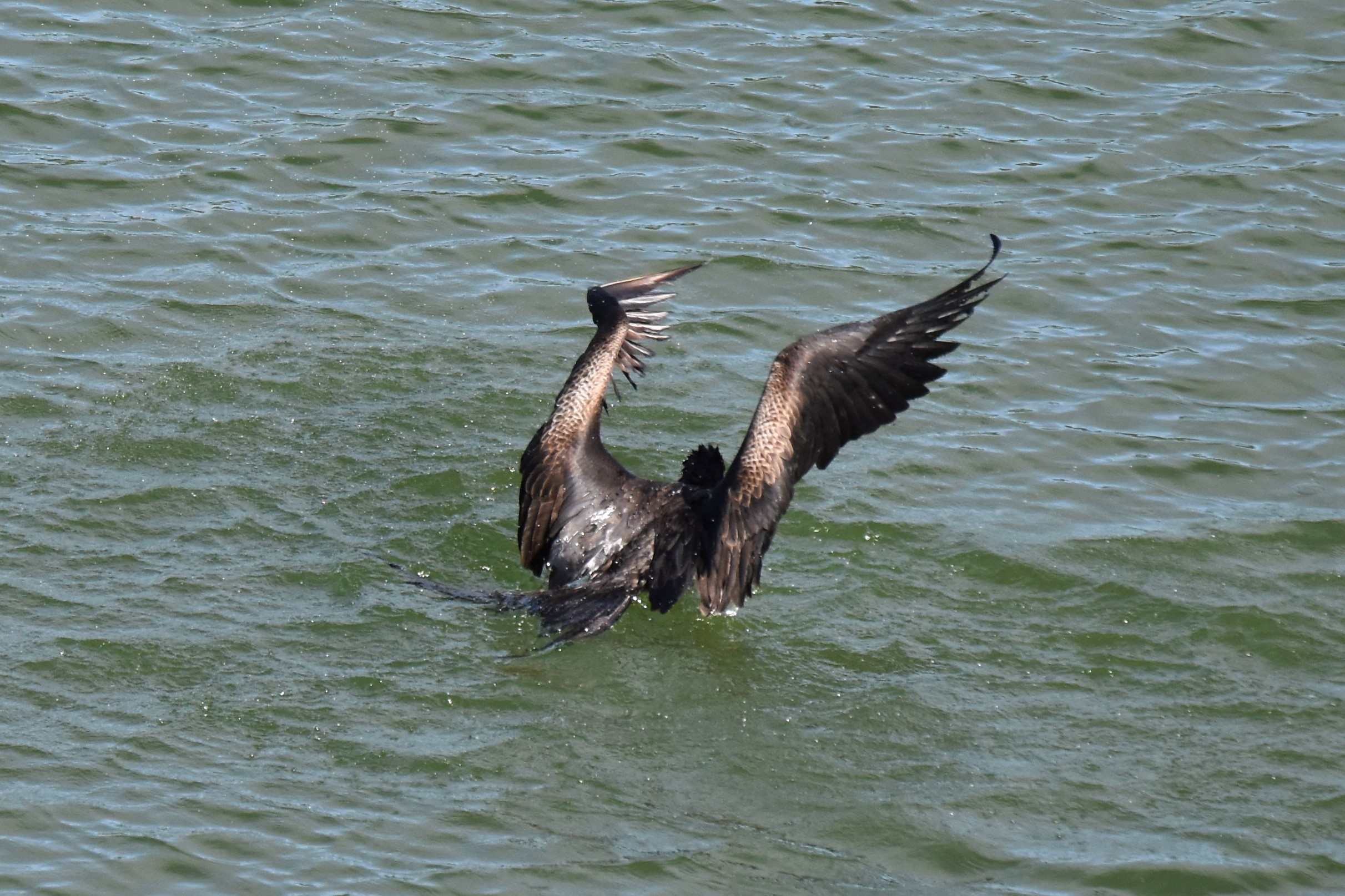
frigatebird rises from Laguna El Junco

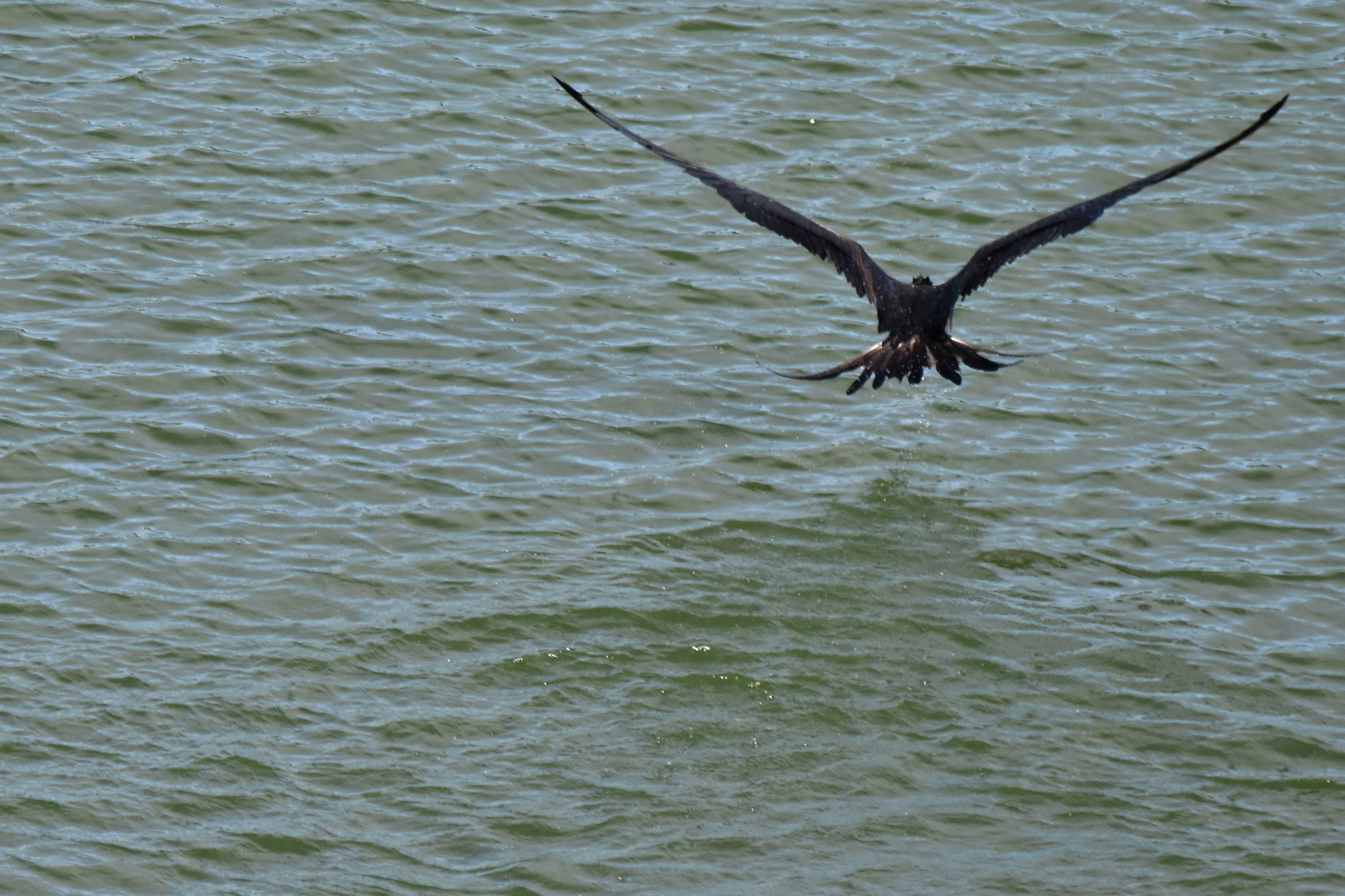
frigatebird shakes the water out of its feathers

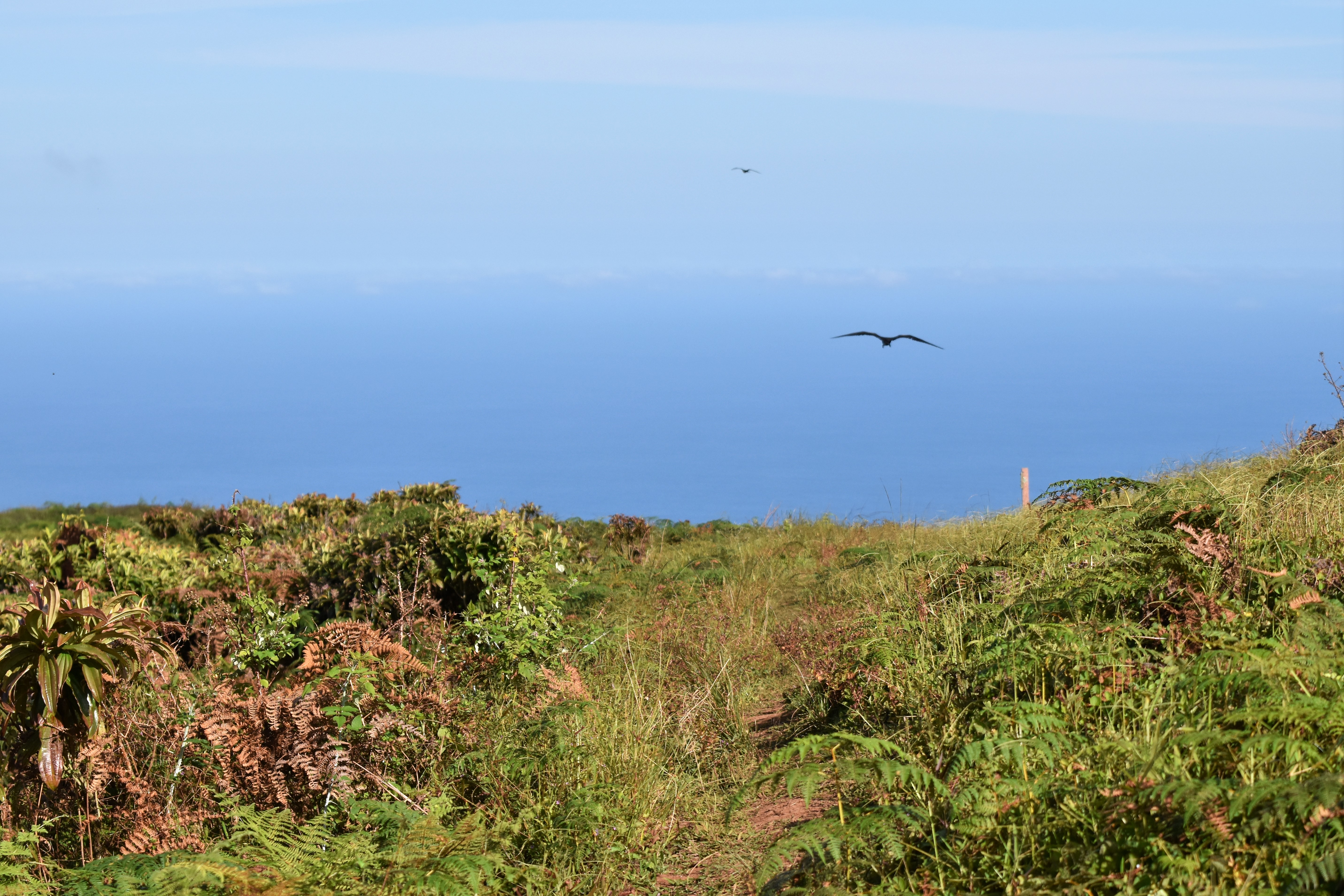
frigatebirds depart towards the sea

== Research ==
According to a 1966 study by Dr. Paul Colinvaux, sediment at the bottom of the lagoon has a thickness of 16 m (52 ft). Using radiocarbon dating, it has been found that 3 m (9.8 ft) of the top layer were deposited during the last 10,000 years, with the remaining 13 m (43 ft) deposited during periods of drought over the course of 38,000 years, giving a total sediment age of 48,000 years.

It is believed that the climate of the Galapagos went through a dry period caused by glacial advances in the Northern Hemisphere, beginning 48,000 years ago and ending 10,000 years ago.
