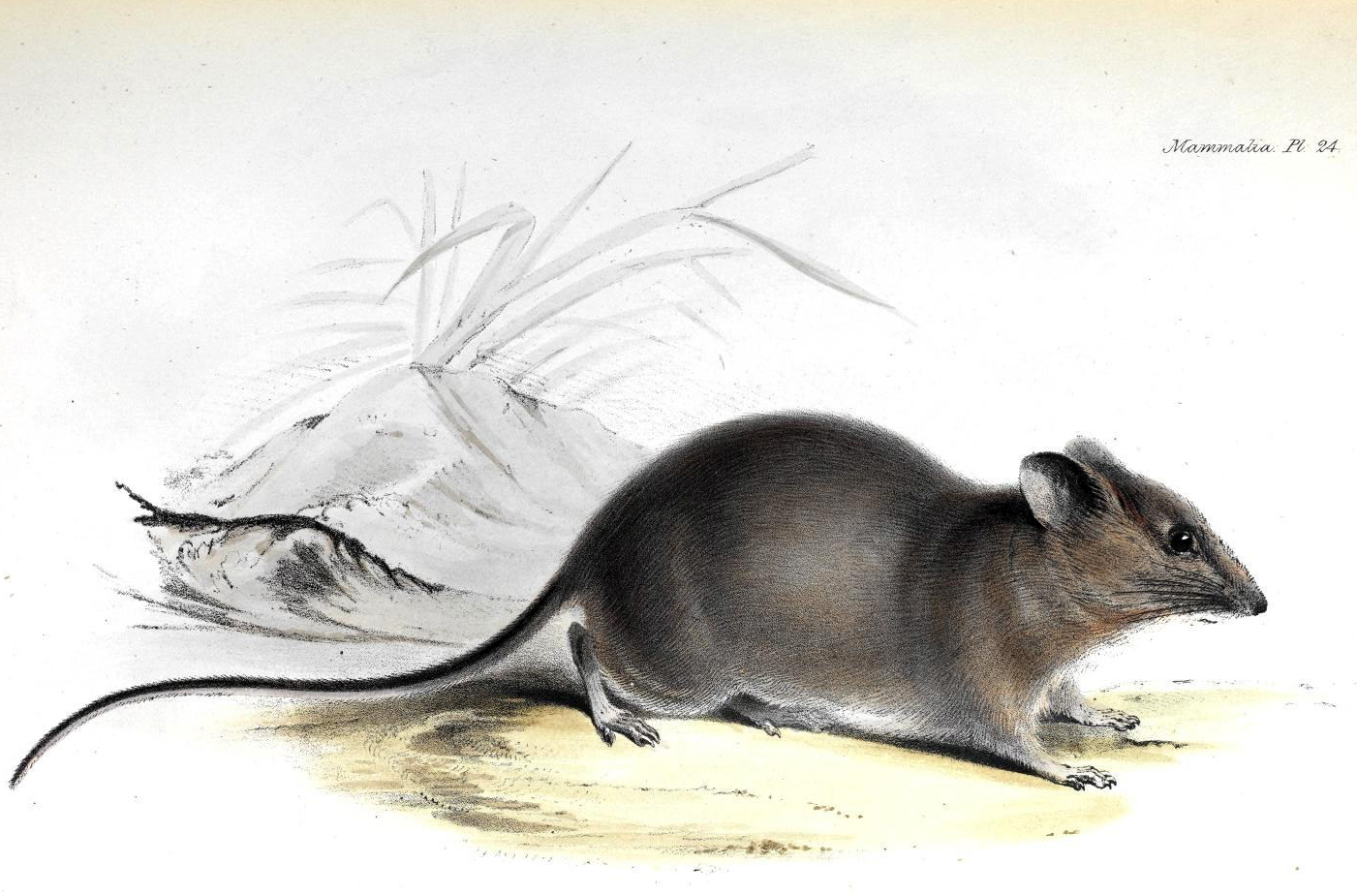
- Aegialomys galapagoensis

Scientific classification
- Domain: Eukaryota
- Kingdom: Animalia
- Phylum: Chordata
- Class: Mammalia
- Order: Rodentia
- Family: Cricetidae
- Subfamily: Sigmodontinae
- Tribe: Oryzomyini
- Genus: Aegialomys; Weksler et al., 2006

Type species
- Oryzomys xantheolus Thomas 1894

Species
- Aegialomys galapagoensis; Aegialomys xanthaeolus

= Aegialomys =

Genus of rodents

Aegialomys is a genus of oryzomyine rodents from the lowlands and mountains of western Peru and Ecuador, including the Galápagos Islands. The species in this genus have historically been placed in Oryzomys, but according to cladistic research, the genus is more closely related to a group containing, among others, Nectomys and Sigmodontomys, than to Oryzomys. The generic name Aegialomys means "coastal mouse" in Ancient Greek (αιγιαλός "coast" and μῦς "mouse") and references the mostly coastal occurrence of the genus.

Aegialomys species have a greyish to buff dorsal pelage which is divided sharply from the white to light yellow ventral pelage. They have relatively short ears. There are crowns of hair at the bases of the toes. The tail is equal to or longer than the body and is darker above than below.

There are two commonly recognized and described species in the genus: the mainland A. xanthaeolus, the type species, and A. galapagoensis. There is however a third, undescribed species occurring on the Ecuadorian coast and the status of the two possible junior synonyms of A. xanthaeolus, A. ica Osgood, 1944 and A. baroni J.A. Allen, 1897, is currently unresolved, although they have been described as distinct species, as has the subspecies A. galapagoensis bauri.
