= Nesoryzomys fernandinae =

Conservation status
- Vulnerable (IUCN 3.1)

Scientific classification
- Kingdom: Animalia
- Phylum: Chordata
- Class: Mammalia
- Order: Rodentia
- Family: Cricetidae
- Subfamily: Sigmodontinae
- Genus: Nesoryzomys
- Species: N. fernandinae

Binomial name
- Nesoryzomys fernandinae Hutterer and Hirsch, 1979

Species of rodent

Nesoryzomys fernandinae, also known as the Fernandina nesoryzomys, Fernandina rice rat, or Fernandina Galápagos mouse, is a species of rodent in the genus Nesoryzomys of family Cricetidae. It is found only on Fernandina in the Galápagos Islands (part of Ecuador), which it shares with N. narboroughi. Its natural habitat is subtropical or tropical dry shrubland. The conservation status of this endemic species continues to be investigated.

== Literature cited ==
- Duff, A. and Lawson, A. (2004). Mammals of the World: A checklist. New Haven, Connecticut: Yale University Press. ISBN 0-7136-6021-X.
- Musser, G. G.; Carleton, M. D. (2005). "Superfamily Muroidea". In Wilson, D. E.; Reeder, D. M. (eds.). Mammal Species of the World: A Taxonomic and Geographic Reference (3rd ed.). Johns Hopkins University Press. pp. 894–1531. ISBN 978-0-8018-8221-0. OCLC 62265494.
