= Nesoryzomys darwini =

Conservation status
- Extinct (1930s) (IUCN 3.1)

Scientific classification
- Kingdom: Animalia
- Phylum: Chordata
- Class: Mammalia
- Order: Rodentia
- Family: Cricetidae
- Subfamily: Sigmodontinae
- Genus: Nesoryzomys
- Species: †N. darwini

Binomial name
- †Nesoryzomys darwini Osgood, 1929

Extinct species of rodent

Nesoryzomys darwini, also known as Darwin's nesoryzomys or Darwin's Galápagos mouse, is an extinct species of rodent in the genus Nesoryzomys.

== Distribution and habitat ==
N. darwini was endemic to Santa Cruz Island in the Galápagos Islands. It was probably nocturnal and inhabited burrows or rock crevices under bushes.

== Extinction ==
Only four specimens exist, collected by Frank Wonder between 12 and 16 January 1929. This extinction may have been caused by competition from (and disease spread by) the introduction of invasive brown and black rats. The other Nesoryzomys known from Santa Cruz, Nesoryzomys indefessus, is also extinct; other species of the genus survive on different islands.
