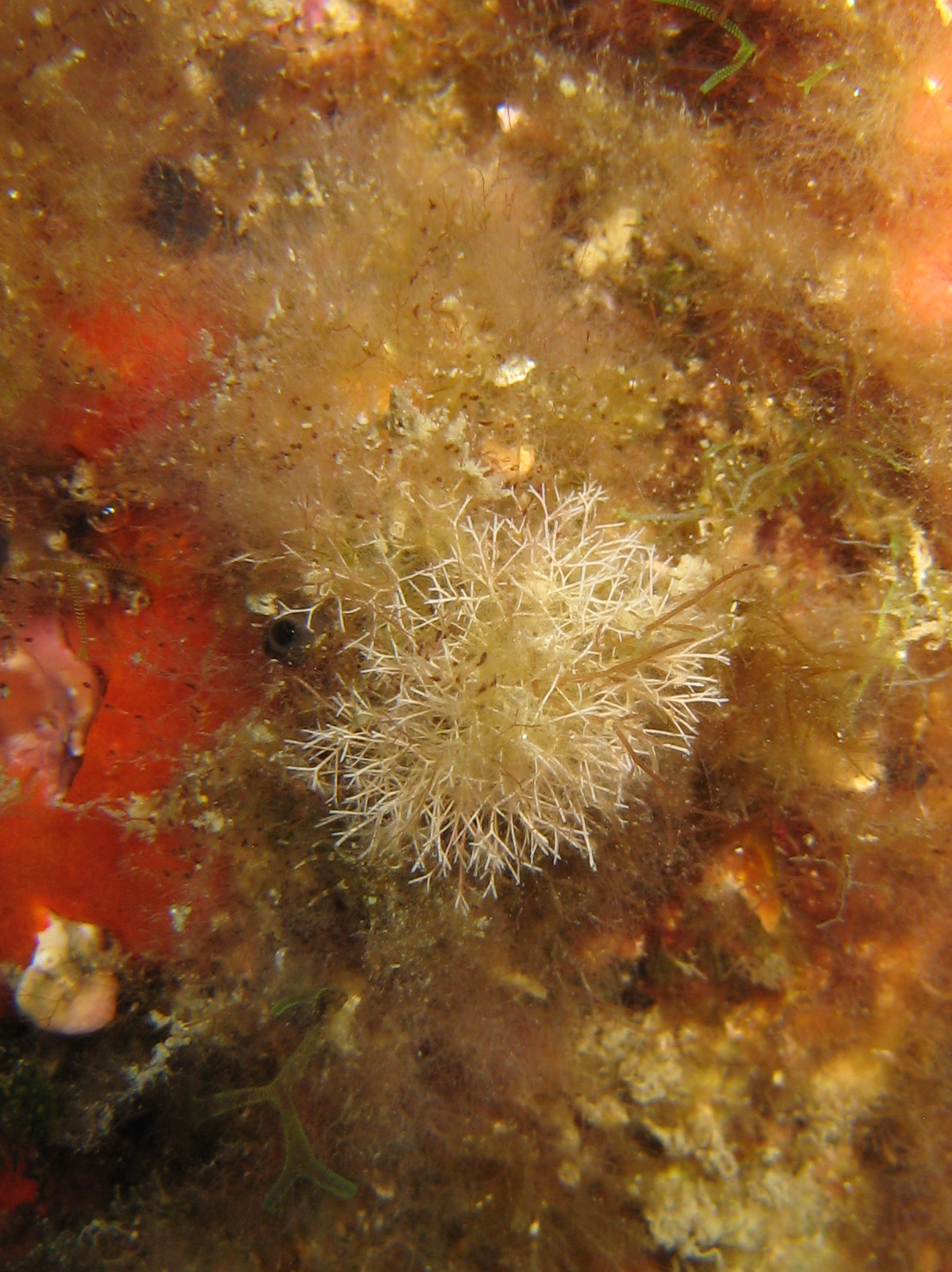
- Liagora viscida

Scientific classification
- Clade: Archaeplastida
- Division: Rhodophyta
- Class: Florideophyceae
- Order: Nemaliales
- Family: Liagoraceae; Kützing, 1843

Genera
- See text

= Liagoraceae =

Family of algae

Liagoraceae is a family of red algae (Rhodophyta) in the order Nemaliales. The type genus is Liagora J.V.Lamouroux.

It was originally called Helminthocladiaceae by J.Agardh in 1851, but P. Silva in 1980 stated that this was predated by Liagoraceae which was published in 1843. Various authors over several years, had tried to form tribes within the family, but it was found (each time) that the family is not able to be divided naturally. As the morphological character analyses show too much variation.

The family was found to be polyphyletic (having a mixed evolutionary origin) based on analyses of rbcL enzymes. The 2 genera of Yamadaella and Liagoropsis, which were previously placed in the Dermonemataceae family, were found to have independent lineages and could be recognized as two new families Yamadaellaceae and Liagoropsidaceae.

== Description ==
Many species are irregular and paniculate (much-branched). They have a basic dichotomous branching but with numerous proliferous lateral branches. They have a thallus (gametophyte) which is erect, they are approx. 1 to 30 cm (0.39 to 11.81 in) tall. With usually much branched irregularly to sub-dichotomously with terete branches, they are mucilagionous, multi-axical with a loose filamentous entwined medulla.

== Distribution ==
The family has cosmopolitan distribution. Species are found in places such as Bermuda, Hawaii, New Caledonia, Egypt, Australia, Canary Islands, China (Hsisha Islands and Hainan Island) and Japan.

They have been found at depths between 3 and 20 m (9.8 and 65.6 ft) (below the sea level).

== List of genera ==
According to the AlgaeBase (amount of species per genus);

- Akalaphycus Huisman, I.A.Abbott & A.R.Sherwood - 2 spp.
- Cumagloia Setchell & N.L.Gardner - 1 sp. (Cumagloia andersonii (Farlow) Setchell & N.L.Gardner, 1917
- Cylindraxis Kraft - 1 sp. (Cylindraxis rotundatus Kraft, 1989)
- Dermonema Harvey ex Heydrich - 5 spp.
- Dotyophycus I.A.Abbott - 5 spp.
- Ganonema K.-C.Fan & Y.-C.Wang - 13 spp.
- Gloiocallis S.-M.Lin, Huisman & D.L.Ballantine - 1 sp. (Gloiocallis dendroidea (P.Crouan & H.Crouan) Showe M.Lin, Huisman & D.L.Ballantine, 2014)
- Gloiotrichus Huisman & Kraft - 2 spp.
- Helminthocladia J.Agardh - 20 spp.
- Helminthora J.Agardh - 8 spp.
- Hommersandiophycus Showe M.Lin & J.M.Huisman - 5 spp.
- Izziella Doty - 5 spp.
- Liagora J.V.Lamouroux - 55 spp.
- Macrocarpus Showe M.Lin, S.-Y.Yang & Huisman - 3 spp.
- Neoizziella S.-M.Lin, S.-Y.Yang & Huisman - 2 spp.
- Otohimella Mas.Suzuki - 1 sp. (Otohimella japonica (Yamada) Mas.Suzuki, T.Segawa, Hi.Mori & H.Nozaki, 2016)
- Patenocarpus Yoshizaki - 1 sp. (Patenocarpus paraphysiferus Yoshizaki, 1987)
- Sinocladia C.K.Tseng & W.Li - 8 spp.
- Stenopeltis Itono & Yoshizaki - 1 sp. (Stenopeltis gracilis (Yamada & Tanaka) Itono & Yoshizaki, 1992)
- Titanophycus Huisman, G.W.Saunders & A.R.Sherwood - 3 spp.
- Trichogloea Kützing - 3 spp.
- Trichogloeopsis I.A.Abbott & Doty - 6 spp.
- Yoshizakia S.-M.Lin, Huisman & C.Payri - 1 sp. (Yoshizakia indopacifica S.-M.Lin, Huisman & C.Payri, 2013)

The GBIF, and WoRMS also accepts;

- Liagoropsis Yamada, 1944 - 3 sp.
- Yamadaella I.A.Abbott, 1970 - 2 sp.
