= Cyperus anderssonii =

Conservation status
- Least Concern (IUCN 3.1)

Scientific classification
- Kingdom: Plantae
- Clade: Tracheophytes
- Clade: Angiosperms
- Clade: Monocots
- Clade: Commelinids
- Order: Poales
- Family: Cyperaceae
- Genus: Cyperus
- Species: C. anderssonii

Binomial name
- Cyperus anderssonii Boeckeler

Species of plant endemic to the Galapagos Islands

Cyperus anderssonii, commonly known as Andersson's sedge, is a species of sedge that is endemic to the Galapagos Islands.

The species was first formally described by the botanist Johann Otto Boeckeler in 1870.

== See also ==
- List of Cyperus species
