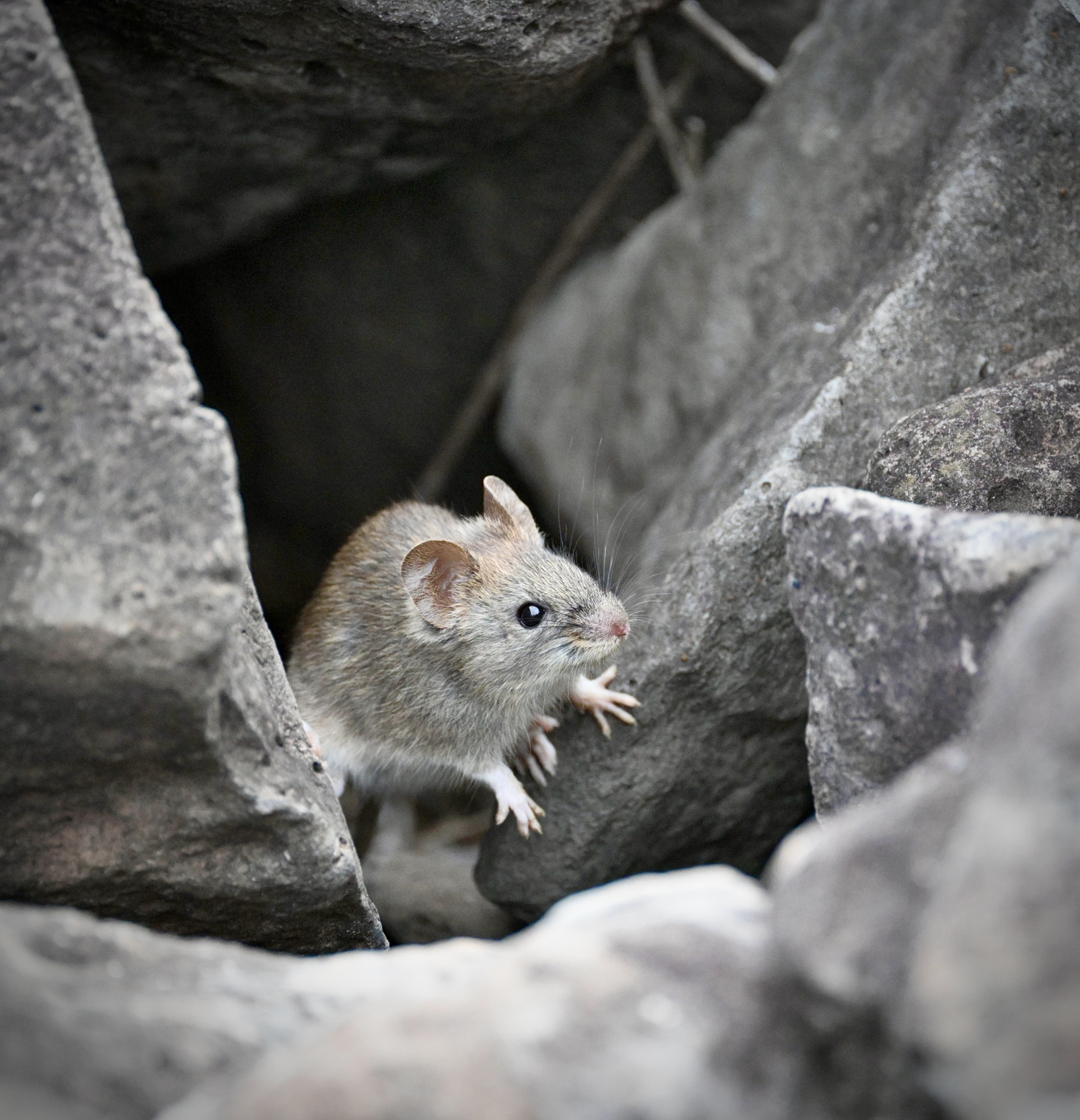
- Galapagos rice rat (Aegialomys galapagoensis) on Santa Fe Island

Conservation status
- Vulnerable (IUCN 3.1)

Scientific classification
- Kingdom: Animalia
- Phylum: Chordata
- Class: Mammalia
- Order: Rodentia
- Family: Cricetidae
- Subfamily: Sigmodontinae
- Genus: Aegialomys
- Species: A. galapagoensis

Binomial name
- Aegialomys galapagoensis (Waterhouse, 1839)

Synonyms
- Oryzomys bauri Oryzomys galapagoensis

= Aegialomys galapagoensis =

Species of rodent

The Galápagos rice rat (Aegialomys galapagoensis), also known as the Galápagos oryzomys, is a species of rodent that is endemic to the Galápagos Islands.

== Description ==
The Galapagos rice rat is a medium-sized rodent, with a head-body length of 20 to 35 centimetres (7.9 to 13.8 in), and a tail 14 to 17 centimetres (5.5 to 6.7 in) long. It has very long, soft and dense fur that is grizzled copper-brown above and yellowish-grey on the underparts. The ears are long and covered with dense hair, and the feet have large pads on the soles, with claws up to 2.5 millimetres (0.1 in) in length, suggesting that it has little, if any, climbing ability.

== Distribution and habitat ==
The Galapagos rice rat is found only in the eastern Galapagos. Today, it occurs only on Santa Fé Island, and possibly on Santiago Island. A separate population formerly existed on San Cristóbal Island, and is considered to represent a separate subspecies, but is thought to have been extinct for many decades. Its natural habitat is subtropical or tropical dry shrubland.

== Biology and behaviour ==
The Galapagos rice rat is primarily nocturnal, but may sometimes be active before sunset, spending the day resting in crevices beneath lava blocks or under shrubs. It is omnivorous, feeding on plant matter and insects. Like many of the animals of the Galápagos, it is tame and unafraid of humans. Scientists working on Santa Fé Island and Fernandina Island have reported that it is necessary to keep tents open to prevent these rice rats from chewing in during the night. It is also commonly seen on beaches, where it is attracted by fish remains left behind by human activity.

Breeding seems to take place primarily in the hot season with young being born between March and May, but may occur at other times of year, perhaps depending on the availability of food resources. Litters of 2–7 young are born hairless and blind, opening their eyes and developing the adult coat by day 13 after birth. The maximum lifespan in the wild has been recorded as 599 days.

== Taxonomy ==
The species was previously placed in Oryzomys as Oryzomys galapagoensis. The subspecies A. g. bauri from Santa Fé Island is sometimes considered to represent a full species. A. g. galapagoensis was formerly found on San Cristóbal Island, where Charles Darwin captured several live specimens on the second voyage of HMS Beagle in 1835. However, it is believed that it became extinct only decades after Darwin's visit, and the next specimens collected were subfossil remains found in lava tubes by David Steadman and colleagues in 1984. Its closest relative is Aegialomys xanthaeolus, the only other species in the genus, which is found in coastal Ecuador and Peru.
