= Nesoryzomys narboroughi =

Conservation status
- Vulnerable (IUCN 3.1)

Scientific classification
- Kingdom: Animalia
- Phylum: Chordata
- Class: Mammalia
- Order: Rodentia
- Family: Cricetidae
- Subfamily: Sigmodontinae
- Genus: Nesoryzomys
- Species: N. narboroughi

Binomial name
- Nesoryzomys narboroughi Heller, 1904

Synonyms
- Nesoryzomys indefessus narboroughi

Species of rodent

Nesoryzomys narboroughi is a rodent in the genus Nesoryzomys from Fernandina Island in the Galápagos Islands.

== Taxonomy ==
Nesoryzomys indefessus, a related extinct species, was found on Santa Cruz Island (Galápagos). Some consider the two to be subspecies of one species, in which the Fernandina form would be Nesoryzomys indefessus narboroughi; however, N. narboroughi is now considered distinct.

== Conservation ==
Due to Fernandina Island's small size, as well as vulnerability to invasive species, N. narboroughi was rated by the IUCN Red List as a Vulnerable species.

== Literature cited ==
- Musser, G. G.; Carleton, M. D. (2005). "Superfamily Muroidea". In Wilson, D. E.; Reeder, D. M. (eds.). Mammal Species of the World: A Taxonomic and Geographic Reference (3rd ed.). Johns Hopkins University Press. pp. 894–1531. ISBN 978-0-8018-8221-0. OCLC 62265494.
