= Aegialomys xanthaeolus =

Conservation status
- Least Concern (IUCN 3.1)

Scientific classification
- Kingdom: Animalia
- Phylum: Chordata
- Class: Mammalia
- Order: Rodentia
- Family: Cricetidae
- Subfamily: Sigmodontinae
- Genus: Aegialomys
- Species: A. xanthaeolus

Binomial name
- Aegialomys xanthaeolus (Thomas, 1894)

Synonyms
- Oryzomys xanthaeolus Thomas, 1894; [Aegialomys] xanthaeolus: Weksler, Percequillo & Voss, 2006

Species of rodent

Aegialomys xanthaeolus, also known as the yellowish oryzomys or yellowish rice rat, is a species of rodent in the family Cricetidae. It belongs to the genus Aegialomys in tribe Oryzomyini, which was not recognized as distinct from Oryzomys until 2006. It is found in coastal Ecuador and Peru. Though it is currently the only formally recognized mainland species of Aegialomys, at least one other exists. The specific name is sometimes incorrectly spelled "xantheolus", without the second "a".

== Literature cited ==
- Musser, G. G.; Carleton, M. D. (2005). "Superfamily Muroidea". In Wilson, D. E.; Reeder, D. M. (eds.). Mammal Species of the World: A Taxonomic and Geographic Reference (3rd ed.). Johns Hopkins University Press. pp. 894–1531. ISBN 978-0-8018-8221-0. OCLC 62265494.
