= Nesoryzomys indefessus =

Conservation status
- Extinct (IUCN 3.1)

Scientific classification
- Kingdom: Animalia
- Phylum: Chordata
- Class: Mammalia
- Order: Rodentia
- Family: Cricetidae
- Subfamily: Sigmodontinae
- Genus: Nesoryzomys
- Species: †N. indefessus

Binomial name
- †Nesoryzomys indefessus (Thomas, 1899)

Extinct species of rodent

Nesoryzomys indefessus, also known as the Santa Cruz nesoryzomys or Indefatigable Galápagos mouse, is an extinct species of rodent from the genus Nesoryzomys of the family Cricetidae (rice rats) from the Galápagos Islands of Ecuador. It formerly lived on Santa Cruz Island, as well as Baltra Island, but is now extinct, probably due to the introduction of black rats. Another related rodent, N. narboroughi, is sometimes considered to be a subspecies of N. indefessus.

== Etymology ==
The specific name indefessus is Latin for "unwearied, indefatigable", but the species was named after its island, which was formerly known as Indefatigable Island after HMS Indefatigable, a British Royal Navy warship. The species's common English names are the Santa Cruz nesoryzomos and the Indefatigable Galápagos mouse.

== Description ==
Nesoryzomys indefessus was a species of rodent in the Nesoryzomys of the family Cricetidae (rice rats). When the skin was measured, the head and body of a N. indefessus collectively measured 135 mm (5.3 in) long. The tail measured 97 mm (3.8 in) long. The maximum length on the skull was 37.3 mm (1.47 in); the maximum width was 18 mm (0.71 in).

The species possessed fur that was coarse and shaggy. Most of the fur was mouse-grey in color and features substantial black streaking. The fur on the top of the feet was white, as was the underside and tip of the tail. The fur on the face was slightly lighter than the fur on the back.

== Taxonomy ==
The species, under the name Oryzomys indefessus, was first described in 1899 by the British zoologist Oldfield Thomas in the journal Annals and Magazine of Natural History. He described the species from a specimen collected by the Frank Blake Webster and Charles Miller Harris's 1897 expedition to the Galápagos. Thomas considered O. indefessus the third species of the genus Oryzomys to be discovered in the Galápagos, after O. galapagoensis (now Aegialomys galapagoensis) and O. bauri (now considered a subspecies of A. galapagoensis).

In 1904, the American zoologist Edmund Heller used new specimens from the Galápagos to describe the genus Nesoryzomys, in which he included O. indefessus. He also described a new species, Nesoryzomys narboroughi, found on Fernandina Island (Narborough Island). Both Nesoryzomys and N. narboroughi were challenged through the 20th century, with the former often considered a subgenus of Oryzomys and the latter sometimes considered a subspecies of N. indefessus. However, N. narboroughi has been considered a distinct species since a survey of Nesoryzomys published in 2000. The species were the same size, but had distinct coloring of their pelage.

== Distribution and extinction ==
Nesoryzomys indefessus was formerly endemic to the islands of Santa Cruz (Indefatigable) and Baltra (South Seymour), both in the Galápagos Islands of Ecuador in the Pacific Ocean. The final example of the species was collected in 1934 despite subsequent surveys searching for further specimens.

The species was declared endangered by the International Union for Conservation of Nature (IUCN) in 1996. The IUCN Red List assessment of N. indefessus declared it extinct in 2000, with the IUCN repeating this determination in its 2008 and 2017 assessments of the species. The IUCN Red List appraised the proximate cause of the species's extinction as the introduction of black rats to the Galápagos. The introduction of other rodents—including the house mouse and Norway rat—and the presence of feral cats were also cited as contributory to declines in native rodents on the Galápagos.
