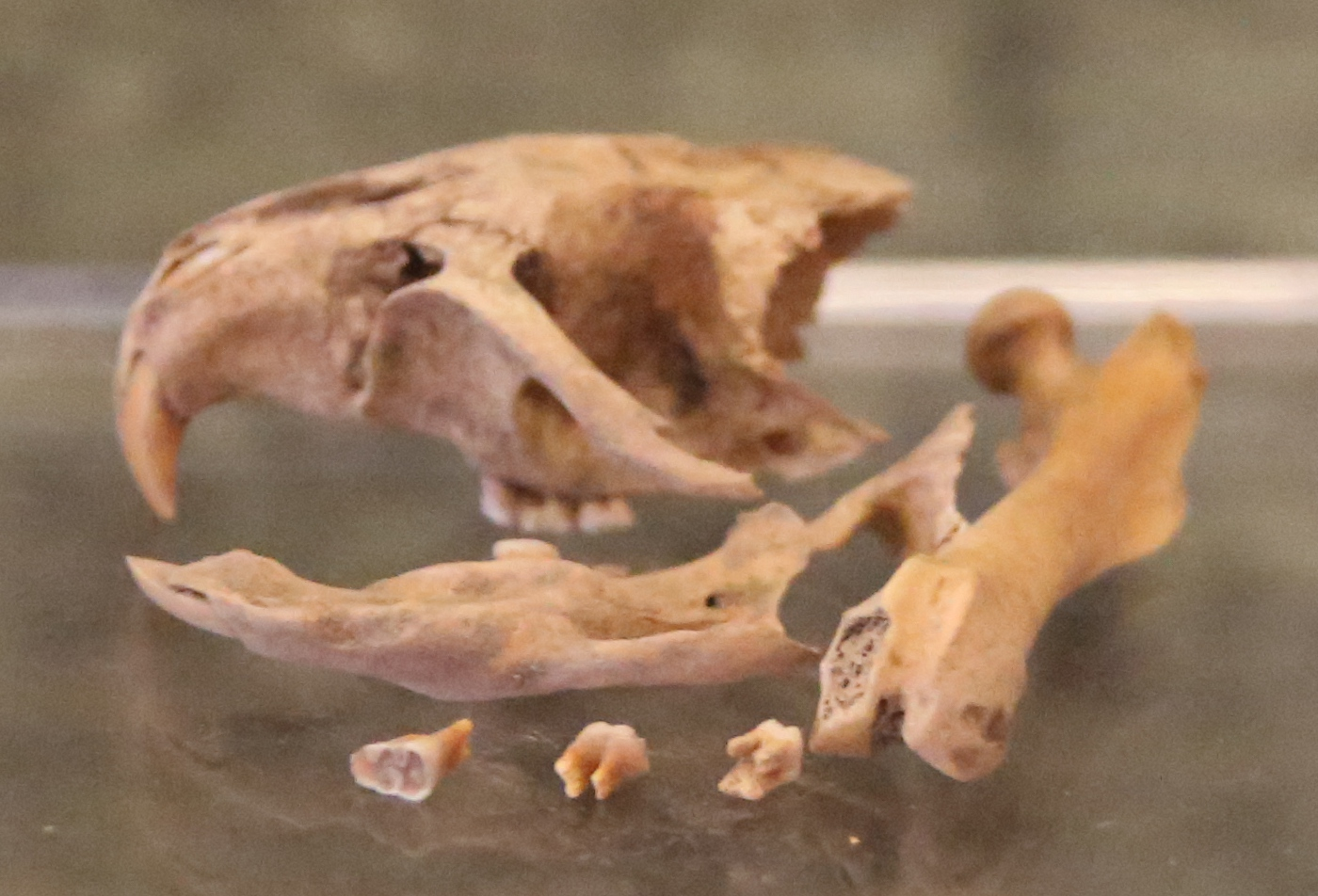
- Skull of M. curioi

Conservation status
- Extinct (IUCN 3.1)

Scientific classification
- Kingdom: Animalia
- Phylum: Chordata
- Class: Mammalia
- Order: Rodentia
- Family: Cricetidae
- Subfamily: Sigmodontinae
- Genus: †Megaoryzomys; Lenglet & Coppois, 1979
- Species: †M. curioi

Binomial name
- †Megaoryzomys curioi (Niethammer, 1964)

= Megaoryzomys =

Megaoryzomys curioi

Extinct genus of rodents

Megaoryzomys curioi, also known as the Galápagos giant rat, is an extinct species of sigmodontine rodent, known only from Santa Cruz Island in the Galápagos Islands. It likely met its demise when European settlers introduced invasive species to the island. It is the only species in the genus Megaoryzomys. Its relationships have historically been unclear; it has been placed in both Oryzomyini and Thomasomyini in the past. A 2021 study favoured placing it in the former on overall skull morphology.
