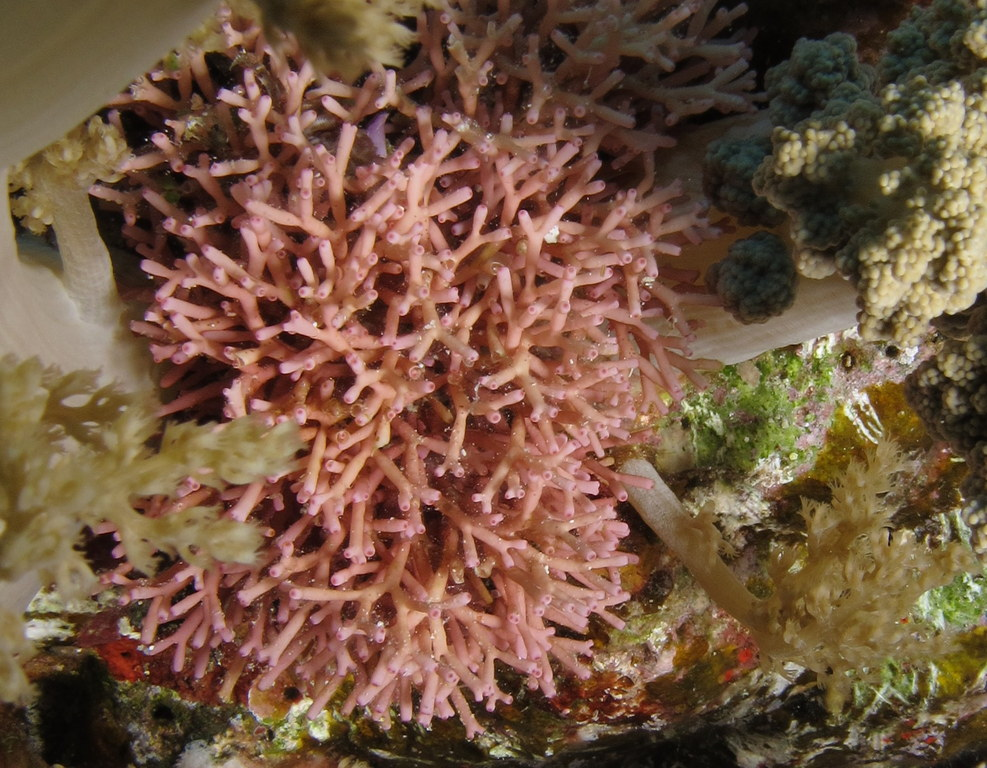
- Galaxaura rugosa

Scientific classification
- Clade: Archaeplastida
- Division: Rhodophyta
- Class: Florideophyceae
- Order: Nemaliales
- Family: Galaxauraceae; P.G.Parkinson, 1983

Genera
- See text

= Galaxauraceae =

Family of algae

Galaxauraceae is a family of red algae (Rhodophyta) in the order Nemaliales.

The type genus is Galaxaura.

The name Galaxauraceae was first published by Russian botanist Paulus Horaninow (1796-1865) in 1843.

The family has cosmopolitan distribution.

Calcification (while, chalky outer layer) appears in all members of the Galaxauraceae family.

== List of genera ==
According to the AlgaeBase (amount of species per genus);

- Actinotrichia Decaisne - 5 spp.
- Dichotomaria Lamarck - 20 spp.
- Galaxaura J.V.Lamouroux - 25 spp.
- Tricleocarpa Huisman & Borowitzka - 8 spp.

Former genera; Alysium J.Agardh, Brachycladia Sonder, Halysium Kützing, Holonema J.E.Areschoug, Microthoe (Decaisne) Harvey, Pseudoscinaia Setchell, Spongotrichum Kützing and Zanardinia J.G.Agardh
