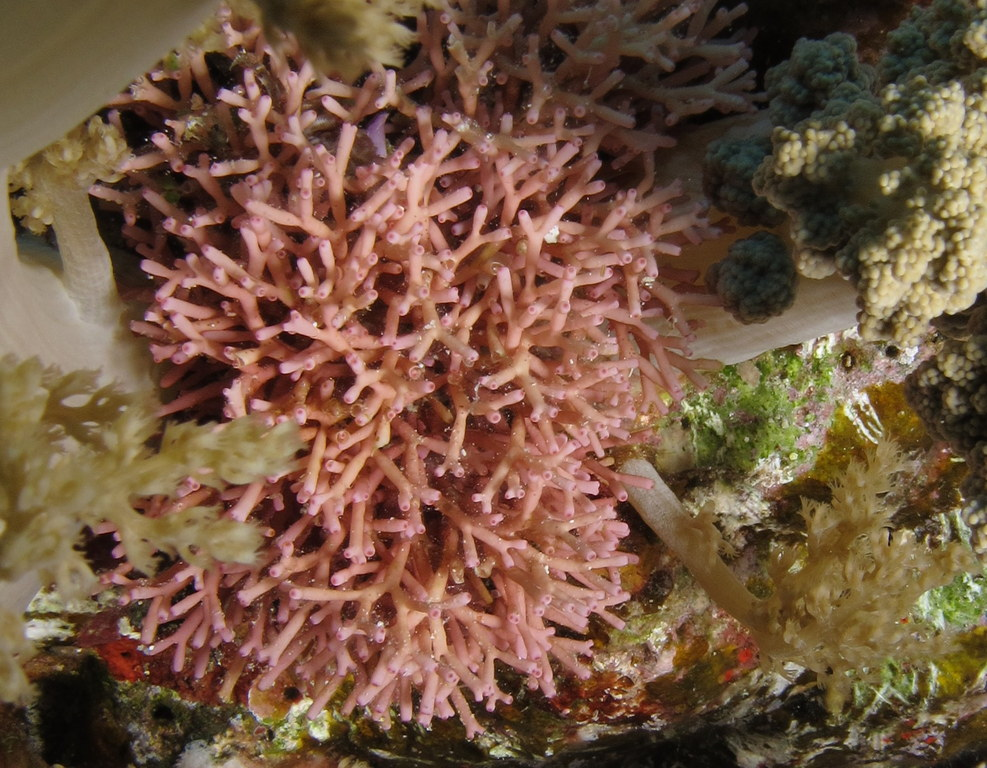
- Galaxaura rugosa

Scientific classification
- Clade: Archaeplastida
- Division: Rhodophyta
- Class: Florideophyceae
- Subclass: Nemaliophycidae
- Order: Nemaliales; F.Schmitz

= Nemaliales =

Order of algae

Nemaliales is an order of red algae.

It holds approximately 286 species.

== Families ==
As accepted by AlgaeBase (with amount of species per genus);

- Suborder Galaxaurineae J.F.Costa, S.-M.Lin, Macaya, Fernández-García, Verbruggen (117)
  - Galaxauraceae P.G.Parkinson - 58 spp.
  - Scinaiaceae Huisman, J.T.Harper & G.W.Saunders - 59 spp.
- Suborder Nemaliineae J.F.Costa, S.-M.Lin, Macaya, Fernández-García & Verbruggen (14)
  - Liagoropsidaceae S.-M.Lin, Rodríguez-Prieto & Huisman - 2 spp.
  - Nemaliaceae De Toni & Levi - 9 spp.
  - Yamadaellaceae S.-M.Lin, Rodríguez-Prieto & J.M.Huisman 3 spp.

Unplaced;

- Liagoraceae Kützing - 152 spp.
